= Dawson Gordon =

Northern Irish trade unionist

Dawson Gordon (died May 1957) was a Northern Irish trade unionist.

Born into a Protestant family in Ballylesson, in County Down, Gordon worked in the textile industry and joined the Flax Roughers' and Yarn Spinners' Trade Union. He soon became a full-time official of the union and of the Irish Textile Federation. In 1910 he was for the first time elected to the Parliamentary Committee of the Irish Trades Union Congress, and he served on its national executive in 1916, 1919-1920 and from 1926 to 1932. He served as president of Belfast Trades Council for more than 25 years, and in the role often offered practical support to unions in the Republic of Ireland. Unusually for a Protestant in Belfast, he opposed military conscription during World War I.

Gordon joined the Independent Labour Party in 1907, initially influenced by William Walker. He later became more militant, under the influence of James Connolly. After World War I, he was prominent in advocating for unemployed ex-servicemen. At the 1920 Belfast Corporation election, he won a seat for the Belfast Labour Party in the Shankill.

Gordon was later a founder member of the Northern Ireland Labour Party, working with William McMullen to establish two divisional parties in Belfast. In the late 1920s, he was elected to the Belfast Corporation. He stood in Belfast Dock at the 1929 Northern Ireland general election, taking second place with 34.7% of the vote.

Gordon retired in 1947, and died ten years later.

Trade union offices
Preceded by H. T. Whitley	President of Belfast Trades Council; 1922–1947	Succeeded by John Kerr
