= Alexander Bowman (Irish politician) =

Irish politician and trade unioinist (1854–1924)

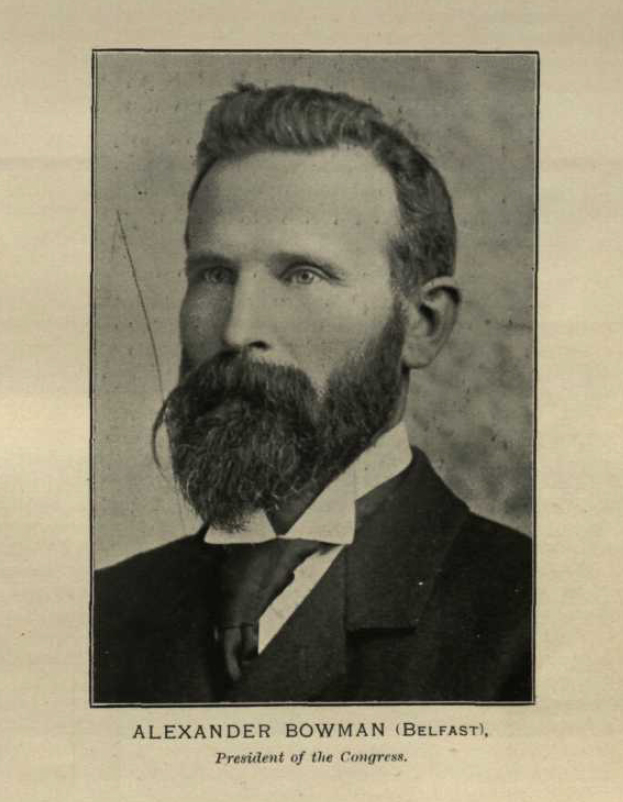
Bowman in 1901

Alexander Bowman (c. March 1854 – 3 November 1924) was an Irish politician and trade unionist.

Baptised Patrick McKeown, he was always known as "Alexander" to his family, and acquired the surname "Bowman" to match that of his older half-siblings. Bowman was baptised on 17 March 1854 as a Roman Catholic, but brought up as a Presbyterian. A temperance campaigner in his youth, he joined the Flax Dressers' Trade and Benevolent Trade Union and, in 1881, became the first secretary of the Belfast Trades Council. He also served as secretary of the Irish Land Restoration Committee, a Georgist organisation. Politically a supporter of William Gladstone and the Liberal Party, this led him to favour home rule for Ireland, and he became a regular speaker at Irish National League meetings, and secretary of the Irish Protestant Home Rule Association.

Bowman stood for Belfast North at the 1885 general election, becoming perhaps the first working-class candidate to stand in Ireland. His candidacy has been described by his biographer as "independent Labour", and by F. W. S. Craig as Liberal. He was defeated by William Ewart, the Conservative Party candidate, who was his former employer.

In 1888, finding it difficult to obtain work, due to his nationalist views, he moved to Glasgow, then subsequently on to London, before returning to Belfast as a socialist activist. He was elected to the Belfast Corporation for the Belfast Labour Party in 1897, coming top of the poll in Duncairn, and in 1901, he was elected as President of the Irish Trades Union Congress.

Trade union offices
| New office | Secretary of the Belfast Trades Council; 1881–1886 | Succeeded by Robert Meharg |
| Preceded by W. J. Leahy | Chair of the Parliamentary Committee of the Irish Trades Union Congress; 1900 | Succeeded by Hugh McManus |
| Preceded by George Leahy | President of the Irish Trades Union Congress; 1901 | Succeeded by William Cave |
