= IRA Director of Intelligence =

The Director of Intelligence attempted to oversee the workings of intelligence officers in the IRA's local units across the island.

== Director of Intelligence of the Irish Republican Army (1917–1922) ==
Image	Name	Assumed position	Left position	Source
	Eamonn Duggan	August 1917	January 1919	
	Michael Collins	January 1919	1922	

== Director of Intelligence of the (anti-Treaty) Irish Republican Army (1922–1969) ==
Image	Name	Assumed position	Left position	Source
	Joseph Griffin^{[a]}	26 March 1922	1 August 1922	
	Sean Hyde^{[b]}	October 1922	December 1922	
	Michael Carolan	August 1922	July 1925	
	Frank Kerlin	July 1925	March 1927	
	Seán MacBride	circa 1927	cira 1929	
	Mick Price	circa 1929	1933	
	Seán MacBride	1933	1936	
	Sean O'Brien	1937	?	
	Willie McGuinness	1939	?	
	Gerard O'Reilly	1942	?	
Significant gap in information				
	Sean O'Bradaigh	1966	?	
	Seán Mac Stíofáin	1966	1969	

a. Griffin was Director of Intelligence of the IRA's Four Courts General Headquarters

b. Hyde was Director of Intelligence of the IRA's Field Headquarters General Headquarters

== Director of Intelligence of the Provisional Irish Republican Army (1969–2005) ==
Image	Name	Assumed position	Left position	Source
	Kieran Conway	late 1974	1975	
	Seamus Twomey	January 1982	?	
	Bobby Storey	late 1990s?	2005?	

== See also ==
- Irish Republican Army
- Chief of Staff of the Irish Republican Army
- IRA Quartermaster General
