= Flax Roughers' and Yarn Spinners' Trade Union =

The Flax Roughers' and Yarn Spinners' Trade Union was a trade union representing lower-paid workers in the flax industry in the north of Ireland.

The union was founded in 1890 as the Flax Roughers' Trade Union. Two earlier trade unions had previously represented workers in the industry, the Flax Roughers' Trade Union and Benevolent Trade Union Society, and an earlier Flax Roughers' Trade Union, but both had dissolved by 1881. By 1892, the new union had 1,244 members, and this remained at a fairly consistent level for many years, peaking at 1,495 in 1900 and still at 1,182 in 1915.

The union was based at Engineers' Hall on College Street in Belfast, where the Flax Dressers' Trade Union and the Power Loom Tenters' Trade Union of Ireland also had their headquarters. It affiliated to the Irish Trades Union Congress and to the Belfast Trades Council, where it played a prominent role.

In 1906, the union was renamed as the "Flax Roughers' and Yarn Spinners' Trade Union", and in 1924 attempted to broaden its membership by becoming the Flax and Other Textile Workers' Trade Union. It remained active until 1957.

Dawson Gordon was secretary of the union for more than 25 years.
