= Claudy bombing =

1972 IRA attack in Northern Ireland

- Part of The Troubles
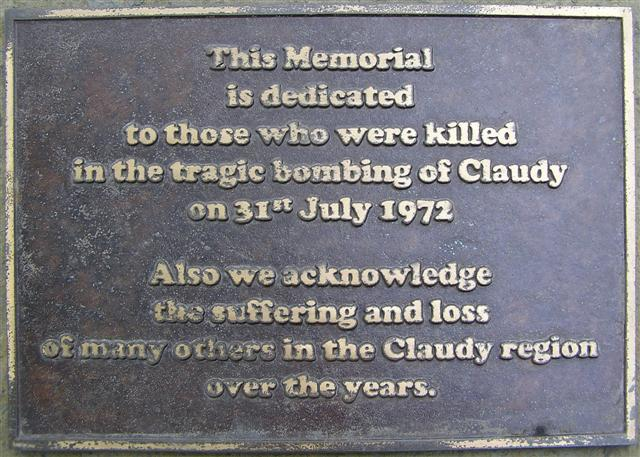
- Memorial plaque in Claudy

- Location: 54°54′41″N 7°9′17″W; Main Street, Claudy, County Londonderry; Northern Ireland
- Date: 31 July 1972
- Target: Unknown
- Attack type: Car bombings
- Deaths: 9
- Injuries: 30
- Perpetrator: IRA

The Claudy bombing occurred on 31 July 1972, when three car bombs exploded mid-morning, two on Main Street and one on Church Street in Claudy in County Londonderry, Northern Ireland. The attack killed nine civilians, injured thirty and became known as "Bloody Monday". Those who planted the bombs had attempted to send a warning before the explosions took place. The warning was delayed, however, because the telephones were out of order due to an earlier bomb attack. The Provisional Irish Republican Army (IRA) issued an immediate denial of responsibility, and later stated that "an internal court of inquiry" had found that its local unit did not carry out the attack. On the thirtieth anniversary of the bombing, there was a review of the case and in December 2002 the IRA was linked to the bomb explosions, although no charges were made.

On 24 August 2010, following an eight-year investigation, the Police Ombudsman for Northern Ireland published a report into the bombing, which stated that the Royal Ulster Constabulary (RUC) believed in the early 1970s that Fr James Chesney, a local Catholic priest, was the IRA's quartermaster and Director of Operations of the South Derry Brigade. The report found that the possibility of his involvement in activities including the Claudy bombing was covered up by senior police officers, government ministers and the Roman Catholic hierarchy.

== Bombing ==
On 31 July 1972 at about 4:00 am, the British Army had begun Operation Motorman. This was an operation to regain control of the "no-go areas" (areas controlled by Irish republican paramilitaries) that had been established in Belfast and Derry. The bombing of Claudy may have been a response to this operation.

Shortly before 10:00 am, three car bombs were placed in the centre of the village, which was busy with shoppers at the time. Initial police investigations found that a car was seen travelling from Claudy at 10:00. It had stopped at the nearby village of Feeny, where a passenger tried to use the public telephone box, which was out-of-order. The car then travelled to Dungiven where it stopped on Main Street. Two men got out and went into separate shops to use the telephones, which were also out of order following a bomb attack at the local telephone exchange. The men then asked the shop assistants to tell the police at Dungiven that there were three bombs in Claudy, but by this time the first bomb had already detonated.

The first bomb, hidden inside a stolen Ford Cortina, exploded at 10:15 outside McElhinney's pub and shop on Main Street. A second bomb, hidden inside a stolen Mini Traveller parked outside the post office on Main Street, was spotted by a police officer, who then began directing people away from the area towards Church Street. At 10:30, a bomb hidden inside a stolen Morris Mini Van detonated outside the Beaufort Hotel on Church Street, killing three people, two of whom had been injured in the first explosion. The bomb outside the post office on Main Street exploded almost simultaneously, causing extensive damage to buildings and vehicles but as the area had been cleared, there was no loss of life.

== Investigations ==
=== RUC investigation ===
The IRA chief of staff Seán Mac Stíofáin stated local IRA units and operations staff had denied involvement in the attack. In December 2002, following a review of intelligence and other material related to the bomb explosions in Claudy, it was revealed that Fr James Chesney had been a leading member of the IRA's South Derry Brigade. Derry politician Ivan Cooper (of the Social Democratic and Labour Party), stated in 2002 that the IRA and Chesney (a Catholic priest from the nearby parish of Desertmartin) were involved in the attack. Cooper stated:

Within a couple of days, a man lurked like a scared rabbit outside one of my constituency offices. He told me the IRA was behind the bomb and I had every reason to believe him. He gave no names and I asked no names. That is the way it was then. It was dangerous to know too much. But several months later, I became aware of the identities and I have absolutely no doubt that Father Jim Chesney was involved.

The type and colour of car used by those who gave the bomb warning were rare in Northern Ireland at that time. In the first week of August 1972, the RUC arrested a suspect (called "Man A") who owned a similar car. He provided an alibi, however, that he had been at Chesney's home in Bellaghy at the time. Chesney and another person corroborated the man's alibi and he was released after being questioned. According to the ombudsman's report, when Chesney was stopped at a police checkpoint in September 1972, a sniffer dog found traces of explosives in his car. The police officers involved in the original police investigation suspected the following:

- that the alibi had been prepared beforehand;
- that "Man A" was an IRA member and had played a key role in the bombing; and
- that Chesney was the quartermaster and "director of operations" for the South Derry IRA and had also been involved in the bombing.

Sometime after the bombing, Chesney was questioned by the then Bishop of Derry, Neil Farren, and later again by Farren's successor, Bishop Edward Daly. At both times, Chesney denied any involvement. Chesney served in the parish of Cullion from July 1972 until November 1972. He was then hospitalised and spent a period of recovery in County Donegal. In December 1973, he was transferred to the parish of Convoy, County Donegal. Although he often crossed the border into Northern Ireland, he was never arrested and never faced a police interview. Chesney died in 1980, aged 46.

=== PSNI investigation ===
No person was arrested for the bombings at the time, but following calls for a new inquiry, a fresh investigation was started by the Police Service of Northern Ireland (PSNI) in 2002. As part of the investigation, the police uncovered documents showing that the then Secretary of State for Northern Ireland Willie Whitelaw discussed Chesney's involvement with Cardinal William Conway. The actions of two other Catholic priests, Patrick Fell and John Burns, were also examined.

On 30 November 2005, the PSNI detained four people in connection with the bombing. They were, however, released without charge the next day and denied involvement. Among those arrested was the then Sinn Féin MLA Francie Brolly, who subsequently initiated a court action against the police but the matter was 'stayed' – he did not proceed with the case.

=== Police Ombudsman report ===
On 24 August 2010, the Police Ombudsman for Northern Ireland published a report into the bombing which concluded that the RUC, British government and the Catholic Church covered up Chesney's involvement. The report stated:

The arrest of a priest in connection with such an emotive atrocity at a time when sectarian killings in Northern Ireland were out of control and the province stood on the brink of civil war was feared, by senior politicians, as likely to destabilise the security situation even further. A deal was therefore arranged behind closed doors to remove Fr Chesney from the province without provoking sectarian fury.

According to the report by Al Hutchinson, the Police Ombudsman,

The RUC's decision to ask the government to resolve the matter with the Church and then accept the outcome, was wrong. The decision failed those who were murdered, injured and bereaved in the bombing. The police officers who were working on the investigation were also undermined. I accept that 1972 was one of the worst years of the Troubles and that the arrest of a priest might well have aggravated the security situation. Equally, I consider that the police failure to investigate someone they suspected of involvement in acts of terrorism could, in itself, have had serious consequences.

The report found the following:

- Detectives believed Father Chesney was the IRA's director of operations in southern County Londonderry and was a prime suspect in the Claudy attack and other paramilitary incidents.
- A detective's request to arrest Chesney was refused by an Assistant Chief Constable of RUC Special Branch who instead said that "matters are in hand".
- The same senior officer wrote to the government about what action could be taken to "render harmless a dangerous priest" and asked if the matter could be raised with the Church's hierarchy.
- In December 1972, William Whitelaw met the head of the Catholic Church in Ireland, Cardinal William Conway, to discuss the issue. According to a Northern Ireland Office official, "the Cardinal said he knew the priest was 'a very bad man' and would see what could be done". The church leader mentioned "the possibility of transferring him to Donegal". In response to this memo, RUC Chief Constable Sir Graham Shillington noted: "I would prefer transfer to Tipperary."
- An entry in Cardinal Conway's diary on 4 December 1972 confirmed that a meeting with Whitelaw had taken place and stated that there had been "a rather disturbing tete-a-tete at the end about C".
- In another diary entry two months later, the Cardinal noted that he had discussed the issue with Father Chesney's superior and that the superior "had given him orders to stay where he was, on sick leave, until further notice".

== Memorial ==
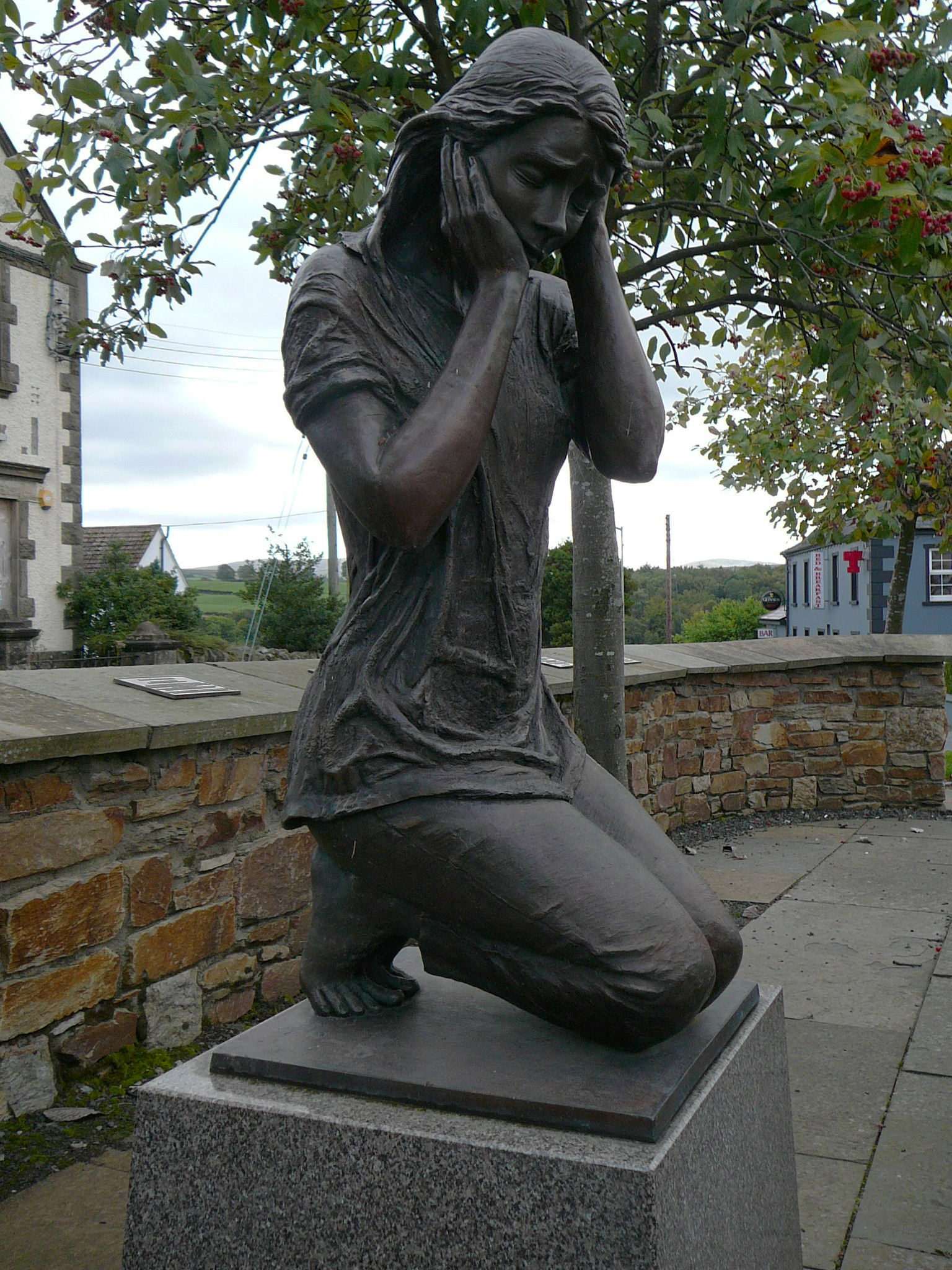
Claudy bombing memorial statue by Elizabeth McLaughlin

A memorial to those killed and injured by the bombing was erected on Claudy's Main Street in 2000, consisting of a bronze figure of a kneeling girl, created by sculptor Elizabeth McLaughlin, mounted on a stone plinth. A number of plaques commemorating the victims are affixed to the wall enclosing the statue. The statue was damaged on 20 October 2006 when vandals knocked it from the plinth.

On the 40th anniversary of the bombing, former IRA leader Martin McGuinness described the events of that day as "appalling and indefensible" and "inflicted on totally innocent people".

== See also ==
- List of terrorist incidents in 1972
