= Donegall Street bombing =

1972 IRA attack in Belfast, Northern Ireland

Coordinates: 54°36′07″N 5°55′41″W

1972 Donegall Street bombing
- Part of the Troubles
- One of the 148 people injured in the Provisional IRA car bomb explosion in Belfast city centre which killed seven men
- Location: 55-59 Lower Donegall Street, Belfast, Northern Ireland
- Date: 20 March 1972; 11:58 UTC
- Attack type: car bombing
- Deaths: 7 (4 civilians, 2 RUC, 1 UDR)
- Injuries: 148
- Perpetrator: Provisional IRA (Belfast Brigade)

On 20 March 1972, the Provisional IRA detonated a car bomb in Lower Donegall Street in Belfast, Northern Ireland, when the street was crowded with shoppers, office workers, and many schoolchildren.

Seven people were killed in the explosion, including two members of the Royal Ulster Constabulary (RUC), who said they had evacuated people to what was considered to have been a safe area following misleading telephone calls, which had originally placed the device in a nearby street. The Provisional IRA Belfast Brigade admitted responsibility for the bomb, which also injured 148 people, but claimed that the security forces had deliberately misrepresented the warnings in order to maximise the casualties. This was one of the first car bombs the IRA used in their armed campaign.

== The bombing ==
=== Warning telephone calls ===
On Monday 20 March 1972, at 11.45 a.m., a local carpet dealer received a telephone call warning that a bomb would explode in Belfast city centre's Church Street which was crowded with shoppers, office workers on lunch breaks, and schoolchildren. British Army troops and the RUC were alerted and immediately began to evacuate the people into nearby Lower Donegall Street. The second call to the Irish News newspaper seven minutes later also gave Church Street as the location for the device. When a final call came at 11.55 advising the News Letter newspaper that the bomb was instead placed outside its offices in Lower Donegall Street where the crowds were being sent. Thus, the warning arrived too late for the security forces to clear the street. Staff working inside the News Letter were told by the caller that they had 15 minutes in which to leave the building, but they never had a chance to evacuate.

=== The explosion ===
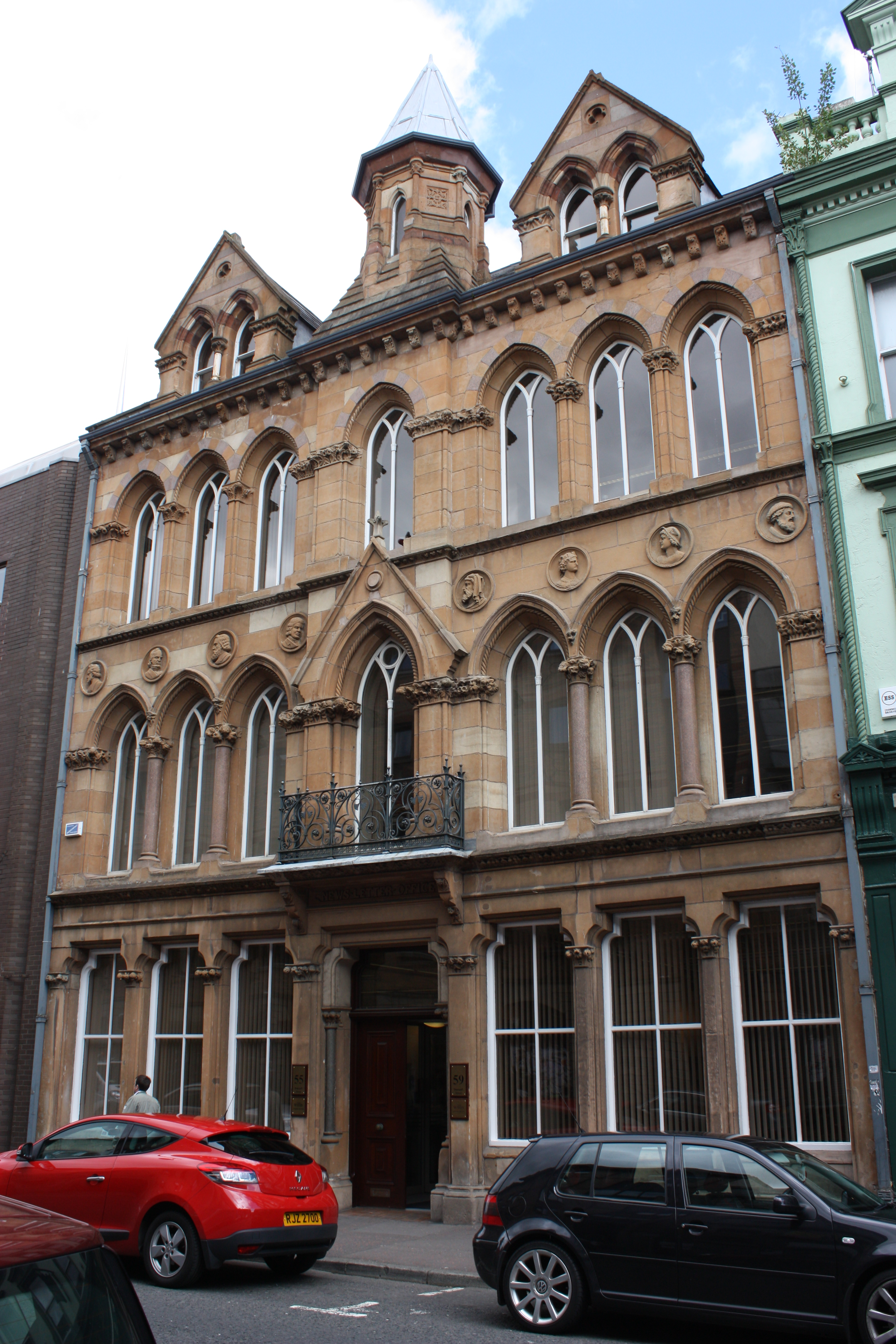
The car bomb exploded outside The News Letter offices located at 55-59 Donegall Street

At 11.58 a.m. a 100 pounds (45 kg) gelignite bomb exploded inside a green Ford Cortina parked in the street outside the offices of the News Letter, shaking the city centre with the force of its blast, and instantly killing the two RUC constables, Ernest McAllister (31) and Bernard O'Neill (36), who had been examining the vehicle. The remains of the two policemen, who had been blown to pieces, were alleged to have been found inside a nearby building. Minutes earlier they had been helping to escort people away from Church Street.

The explosion sent a ball of flame rolling down the street and a pall of black smoke rose upwards. The blast wave ripped into the crowds of people who had run into Donegall Street for safety, tossing them in all directions and killing another four men outright: three of them, Ernest Dougan (39), James Macklin (30) and Samuel Trainor (39) were corporation binmen working in the area, and the fourth man was Sydney Bell (65). Trainor was also an off-duty Ulster Defence Regiment (UDR) soldier and a member of the Orange Order. A seriously wounded pensioner, Henry Miller (79) would die in hospital on 5 April. Most of the dead were mutilated beyond recognition; one of the binmen lay in the road with his head shattered. With the exception of Constable O'Neill, who was a Catholic, the other six victims were Protestants.

The explosion blew out all the windows in the vicinity, sending shards of glass into people's bodies as they were hit by falling masonry and timber; severed limbs were hurled into the road and into the mangled front of an office building. The ground floor of the News Letter offices and all buildings in the area suffered heavy damage. The News Letter library in particular sustained considerable damage with many priceless photographs and old documents destroyed. Around the blast's epicentre, the street resembled a battlefield. About one hundred schoolgirls lay wounded on the rubble-strewn, bloody pavement covered in glass and debris, and screaming in pain and fright. A total of 148 people were injured in the explosion, 19 of them seriously, including people who had lost eyes and were badly maimed. Among the injured were many News Letter staff.

One of the wounded was a child whose injuries were so severe a rescue worker at the scene assumed the child had been killed. A young Czech art student Blanka Sochor (22) received severe injuries to her legs; she was photographed by Derek Brind of the Associated Press as a British Paratrooper held her in his arms. Passerby Frank Heagan witnessed the explosion and came upon what was left of two binmen who had been "blown to pieces". He added that "there was blood everywhere and people moaning and screaming. The street was full of girls and women all wandering around". The injured could be heard screaming as the ambulances transported them to hospital; emergency amputations were performed at the scene. One policeman angrily denounced the attack by stating: "This was a deliberate attempt to kill innocent people. The people who planted it must have known that people were being evacuated into its path".

Whilst the security forces and firemen pulled victims from the debris in Donegall Street, two more bombs went off elsewhere in the city centre; however, nobody was hurt in either attack. That same day in Derry, a British soldier, John Taylor, was shot dead by an IRA sniper. In Dublin, the IRA's Chief of Staff, Seán Mac Stíofáin, suffered burns to his face and hands after he opened a letter bomb sent to him through the post. Cathal Goulding, head of the Official IRA, also received a letter bomb but escaped injury by having dismantled the device before it exploded.

This was amongst the first car bombs that the Provisional IRA used during The Troubles in its militant campaign to force a British military withdrawal and reunite the six counties of Northern Ireland with the rest of the island of Ireland. It was part of the IRA's escalation of violence to avenge the Bloody Sunday killings in which 13 unarmed Catholic civilian men were killed by the British Army's Parachute Regiment when the latter opened fire during an anti-internment demonstration held in Derry on 30 January 1972.

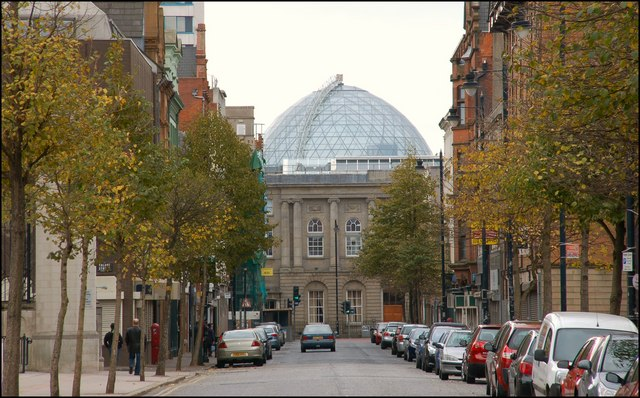
Lower Donegall Street in 2007, looking south

== Aftermath ==
The bombing was carried out by the North Belfast unit of the Provisional IRA's Third Battalion Belfast Brigade. The OC of the Brigade at that time was the volatile Seamus Twomey, who had ordered and directed the attack.

On 23 March, the IRA admitted responsibility for the bomb with one Belfast Brigade officer later telling a journalist "I feel very bad when the innocent die". The IRA, however, tempered the admission by claiming that the caller had given Donegall Street as the correct location for the bomb in all the telephone calls and that the security forces had deliberately evacuated the crowds from Church Street to maximise the casualties. The IRA's official statement claiming responsibility for the blast was released through the Irish Republican Publicity Bureau. It read as follows:

Proper and adequate warnings have been given before all our operations. This practice will continue. Several warnings have been changed by the British security forces in order to cause maximum civilian casualties. "This was the principal factor for the tragic loss of life and heavy civilian casualties in Donegall Street on Monday last".

Tim Pat Coogan suggested that the IRA had overestimated the security forces' capacity to deal with multiple bomb scares, adding that in all probability, the caller had been young, nervous, and inexperienced. It was also alleged that the bombers had intended to leave the car bomb in Church Street but were unable to find a parking place and instead left it in Donegall Street.

The attack was condemned by church leaders of all denominations in Ireland. The Official IRA issued a statement disassociating itself from the bombing which it "condemned in the strongest possible terms".

Two days prior to the bombing, Bill Craig, former Minister of Home Affairs and founder and leader of the Unionist Vanguard movement, had held a rally at Belfast's Ormeau Park attended by 100,000 loyalists. There he had made the following speech that struck fear in many people from the Catholic community: "We [Ulster Vanguard] must build up a dossier of the men and women who are a menace to this country. Because if and when the politicians fail us, it may be our job to liquidate the enemy". The next day, 30,000 Catholics paraded through Belfast to Ormeau Park where they held their own rally in protest at Craig's threatening speech. Republican Labour Party leader Paddy Kennedy promised that any Protestant backlash against Catholics "would be met by a counter-backlash by the Irish people".

According to Ed Moloney, the bombing was considered a disaster for the IRA. Coming so soon after the horrific Abercorn Restaurant bombing which had killed two young Catholic women and maimed many others, the Donegall Street bombing caused them to lose considerable support from the Catholic and Nationalist community who recoiled from the carnage the bombing had wrought.

The IRA followed the Donegall Street attack two days later with a car bomb at a carpark adjacent to Great Victoria Street railway station and close to the Europa Hotel. Seventy people were treated in hospital for injuries received mainly by flying glass, but there were no deaths. The blast caused considerable damage to two trains, parked vehicles, the hotel, and other buildings in the area.

== Political and security aftermath ==
On 24 March, to the profound shock and anger of loyalists and Unionists, British Prime Minister Edward Heath announced the suspension of the 50-year-old Stormont parliament and the imposition of Direct Rule from London.

The Donegall Street bombing led to the closure of traffic in the Royal Avenue shopping district and the erection of security gates which put a "ring of steel" around Belfast city centre.

Although many members of the Provisional IRA were rounded up by police in the wake of the attack, none of the bombers were ever caught nor was anybody ever charged in connection with the bombing.

In her 1973 book To Take Arms: My Life With the IRA Provisionals, former IRA member Maria McGuire described her sentiments following the Donegall Street bombing,

I admit at the time I did not connect with the people who were killed or injured in such explosions. I always judged such deaths in terms of the effect they would have on our support – and I felt that this in turn depended on how many people accepted our explanation.
