= List of terrorist incidents in 1972 =

This is a timeline of incidents in 1972 that have been labelled as "terrorism" and are not believed to have been carried out by a government or its forces (see state terrorism and state-sponsored terrorism).

== Guidelines ==
- To be included, entries must be notable (have a stand-alone article) and described by a consensus of reliable sources as "terrorism".
- List entries must comply with the guidelines outlined in the manual of style under MOS:TERRORIST.
- Casualties figures in this list are the total casualties of the incident including immediate casualties and later casualties (such as people who succumbed to their wounds long after the attacks occurred).
- Casualties listed are the victims. Perpetrator casualties are listed separately (e.g. x (+y) indicate that x victims and y perpetrators were killed/injured).
- Casualty totals may be underestimated or unavailable due to a lack of information. A figure with a plus (+) sign indicates that at least that many people have died (e.g. 10+ indicates that at least 10 people have died) – the actual toll could be considerably higher. A figure with a plus (+) sign may also indicate that over that number of people are victims.
- If casualty figures are 20 or more, they will be shown in **bold**. In addition, figures for casualties more than 50 will also be **underlined**.
- Incidents are limited to one per location per day. If multiple attacks occur in the same place on the same day, they will be merged into a single incident.
- In addition to the guidelines above, the table also includes the following categories:

0 people were killed/injured by the incident.
1–19 people were killed/injured by the incident.
20–49 people were killed/injured by the incident.
50–99 people were killed/injured by the incident.
100+ people were killed/injured by the incident.

== List ==
Date	Type	Dead	Injured	Location	Details	Perpetrator	Part of
January–December	Shootings, Assassinations	10	Unknown	Across Argentina	10 people including soldiers and executives were killed in retaliation for the Trelew massacre at the Admiral Zar Base belonging to the Argentine Navy, which occurred on 22 August.	FAR, Montoneros, and ERP	Dirty War
January 26	Bombing	27	1	Srbská Kamenice, Czechoslovakia	Yugoslavian Airlines Flight 367 is brought down by an explosion, killing 27 out of 28 on board except one Serbian flight attendant named Vesna Vulović who survives a 10,160 meter (33,330 ft) drop. Officially a bomb was placed on the plane by Ustasa agents, but speculation exists that the plane was downed by two Czechoslovak SA-12 surface-to-air missiles because it has entered a restricted military area without permission. The McDonnell Douglas DC-9 airplane is destroyed.	Ustaše	
January 30	State terrorism, Mass shooting	14	15+	Derry, Northern Ireland	Bloody Sunday (1972): A British Army regiment opened fire on Northern Irish protesters, killing 14 and wounded over 15. Many of the victims were shot while fleeing from the soldiers, and some were shot while trying to help the wounded. Other protesters were injured by shrapnel, rubber bullets, or batons, two were run down by British Army vehicles, and some were beaten.	British Army	The Troubles
February 19–28	Hostage taking	3	12	Karuizawa, Japan	A standoff between five Japanese United Red Army members and police, spiraled into hostage crisis at a lodge house. After nine days, the authorities tried to rescue a female hostage, leading to a shootout in which two policemen are killed and 12 injured.	United Red Army	
February 22–23	Hijacking	0	0	Aden, Yemen	Lufthansa Flight 649 was hijacked by Popular Front for the Liberation of Palestine members half an hour after the aircraft had departed Delhi-Palam Airport. Eventually, all hostages on board the Boeing 747-200 were released when the West German government paid a ransom of US$5 million.	PFLP	Israeli–Palestinian conflict
February 22	Car bombing	7	18	Aldershot, United Kingdom	1972 Aldershot bombing: The Official Irish Republican Army kills seven civilians after it bombs a British Army military barracks.	OIRA	The Troubles
March 4	Bombing	2	130	Belfast, Northern Ireland	Abercorn Restaurant bombing: a bomb exploded in a crowded restaurant, killing two Catholic civilians (Anne Owers and Janet Bereen) and wounding 130. The Provisional Irish Republican Army (IRA) was blamed.	PIRA	The Troubles
March 20	Bombing	7	148	Belfast, Northern Ireland	Donegall Street bombing – the Provisional Irish Republican Army (IRA) detonated its first car bomb, on Donegall Street. Allegedly due to inadequate warnings, four civilians, two RUC officers and a UDR soldier were killed while 148 people were wounded.	PIRA	The Troubles
April 6	Bombing	0	0	Sōji-ji, Japan	Bombing of a cemetery for Japanese people who lived in Korea under Japanese rule.	East Asia Anti-Japan Armed Front	
May 8	Hijacking	1 (+2)	3	Lod, Israel	Four PLO terrorists hijacked Sabena Flight 571 carrying 99 passengers and ten crew members en route from Brussels to Tel Aviv. In a mission titled "Operation Isotope," 16 members of Sayeret Matkal posed as refueling and technical personnel and stormed the plane, killing the terrorists and releasing the passengers.	PLO	Israeli–Palestinian conflict
May 30	Mass shooting	26 (+2)	79 (+1)	Lod, Israel	Lod Airport massacre by the Japanese Red Army, killing 26 and injuring 79.	Japanese Red Army; PFLP-EO	Israeli–Palestinian conflict
July 21	Bombings	9	130	Belfast, Northern Ireland	Bloody Friday (1972): Nine killed and 130 injured as the Provisional Irish Republican Army (IRA) set off 22 bombs.	PIRA	The Troubles
July 31	Car bombings	9	30	Claudy, Northern Ireland	In the Claudy bombing, three car bombs are detonated, killing nine people. No group claimed responsibility.	PIRA	The Troubles
August 15	Hijacking	0	0	Trelew, Argentina	Austral Líneas Aéreas Flight 811 from Comodoro Rivadavia to Buenos Aires was hijacked by terrorists in Trelew. The plane was diverted to Puerto Montt, Chile and finally Santiago, where the all hostages were released and terrorists surrendered. A week later, on August 22, the terrorists were killed by the Argentine Navy in the Trelew massacre.	FAR, Montoneros, and ERP	Dirty War
August 22	Bombing	9	20	Newry, Northern Ireland	Newry customs bombing: three Provisional Irish Republican Army (IRA) members walked into a customs office with a bomb. It exploded prematurely, killing all of them, two lorry drivers and four customs staff.	PIRA	The Troubles
September 5–6	Massacre	12 (+5)		Munich, West Germany	Munich massacre: Black September kidnaps and kills eleven Israeli Olympic athletes and one German policeman.	Black September	Israeli–Palestinian conflict
September 16	Bombings	0	16	Sydney, Australia	Bombings of Yugoslavian travel agency. Believed to have been in retaliation for the execution of two Croatian Australians in Yugoslavia.	Croatian nationalists	
October 4	Bombing, false flag	0	2	Paris, France	Bombing of a PLO bookstore. The bombers claimed to be Zionist extremists but were actually neo-Nazis hoping that the bombing would incite confrontations between French Arabs and Jews	French neo-Nazis	
October 23	Bombings	0	0	Asahikawa, Japan	Bombings of a monument depicting Japanese soldiers surrounding an elderly Ainu and the Ainu research center at Hokkaido University	East Asia Anti-Japan Armed Front	
October 31	Car bombing	2	12	Belfast, Northern Ireland	Benny's Bar bombing: Car bombing of a Catholic-owned pub in Sailortown by the Ulster Defence Association (UDA). Two girls aged 6 and 4 are killed.	UDA	The Troubles
December 1	Car bombing	2	131	Dublin, Ireland	1972 Dublin car bombings: Two car bombs exploded in the middle of Dublin.	Ulster Volunteer Force	The Troubles
December 7	Attempted hijacking	0 (+7)		Addis Ababa, Ethiopia	Attempted hijacking of an airliner by the Eritrean Liberation Front. All 7 hijackers were killed by security guards on board the plane and were the only fatalities.	Eritrean Liberation Front	Eritrean War of Independence
December 20	Shooting	5		Derry, Northern Ireland	Five civilians, four Catholics and one Protestant, were killed in gun attack on the Top of the Hill Bar, Strabane Old Road, Waterside. It is believed the Ulster Defence Association (UDA) was responsible.	UDA	The Troubles
December 28	Car bombing	2	10	County Cavan & County Monaghan, Republic of Ireland	The Ulster Volunteer Force detonated a car bomb at Clones, County Monaghan and another at Belturbet, Cavan. Two people were injured in the Clones bomb, the Belturbet bomb was much worse killing two young teenagers, a boy and a girl and 8 people were injured in the blast.	Ulster Volunteer Force	The Troubles
December 28	Hostage-taking	0	0	Bangkok, Thailand	Four members of Black September seize the Israeli Embassy.	Black September	Israeli–Palestinian conflict

== See also ==
- List of terrorist incidents
