= 1920 Belfast Corporation election =

Local election in Ireland

- 16 January 1920

All 60 seats to Belfast Corporation 31 seats needed for a majority
	First party	Second party
Leader	William Coates	David Robb Campbell
Party	UUP	Belfast Labour
Seats won	35	12
Seat change	▼17	▲12
- Map showing the area of Belfast Corporation
Council control after election
Irish Unionist

An election to Belfast Corporation took place in January 1920 as part of that year's Irish local elections. The Local Government (Ireland) Act 1919 had seen elections for local government in Ireland change to a more proportional system. As a result, Unionist dominance of the Belfast council was somewhat undermined, and they lost 15 seats. In contrast Labour, Sinn Féin, and Nationalist representation grew, resulting in a more politically and socially representative council.

147 candidates stood for the sixty seats on the council. The sixty seats were in nine new wards, identical to the parliamentary constituencies. In advance of the election, the Irish Times stated that it expected the Unionists to lose between five and eight seats, to be picked up by the Labour and Nationalist candidates, with Sinn Féin having a chance of taking one or two seats.

The result in the Falls was controversial; over twenty candidates stood, creating the most complex election by single-transferable vote to date; and 764 votes were disallowed due to spoiled ballot papers. 300 of these lacked an official mark; this was because the printing press marking them had ceased adding it near the end of the run, but this error was not noticed until the election count took place.

After the election Sir William Coates, 1st Baronet was elected by the new council as Lord Mayor of Belfast.

Following the partition of Ireland the Northern Irish Government restored the older, and less representative ward based electoral system.

== Results by party ==
Party	Candidates	Seats	±	First Pref. votes	FPv%	±%
UUP	56	29	-17	40,907	45.95	
Labour Unionist	56	6	-17	4,699	5.28	
Belfast Labour	37	10	+10	12,768	14.34	
Nationalist	40	5	-3	10,758	12.08	
Sinn Féin	10	5	+5	7,120	8.00	
Ind. Unionist		2		4,167	4.68	
Independent Labour		2		3,007	3.37	
Independent		1		4,467	5.02	
NAUL		0		1,138	1.28	
Totals		60		89,031	100.00	—

== Councillors ==
=== Pottinger ===
Pottinger - 6 seats
Party	Candidate	FPv%	Count									
Party	Candidate	FPv%	1	2	3	4	5	6	7	8	9	10
UUP	Julia McMordie		1,968									
UUP	David Anderson		1,698									
UUP	W. J. McGowan		-	-	-	-	-	1,140	1,485			
Labour Unionist	John F. Gordon		-	-	-	-	-	-	1,054	1,329		
Nationalist	Archibald Savage		-	-	-	-	-	-	-	-	-	1,152
Belfast Labour	J. S. L. McKeag		-	-	-	-	-	-	-	-	-	1,050
Belfast Labour	James Duff		-	-	-	-	-	-	-	-	1,002	Eliminated
Nationalist	James Smith		-	-	-	-	-	-	-	643	Eliminated	
UUP	John S. Shaw J.P.		-	-	-	-	-	-	Eliminated			
UUP	John Stanley Johnston		-	-	-	-	-	Eliminated				
NAUL	James Johnston		-	-	-	-	Eliminated					
Ind. Nationalist	James Feenan		-	-	-	Eliminated						
Independent	Zimri Stewart		-	-	-	Eliminated						
Belfast Labour	Alexander Stewart		-	-	-	Eliminated						
Electorate: 13,474 Valid: 8,379 Spoilt: 267 Quota: 1,198 Turnout: 8,646

=== Ormeau ===
Ormeau - 6 seats
Party	Candidate	FPv%	Count									
Party	Candidate	FPv%	1	2	3	4	5	6	7	8	9	10
UUP	Dr J. D. Williamson	12.45	1,037	1,055	1,090	1,143	1,302					
UUP	J. W. T. Watters	12.40	1,033	1,044	1,098	1,137	1,366					
UUP	John Campbell White (Lord Mayor)	11.74	978	991	1,022	1,051	1,191					
UUP	William Frederick Coates	11.35	945	957	1,020	1,055	1,162	1,307				
Belfast Labour	James Baird	9.63	802	815	826	876	890	-	-	-	1,082	1,259
Nationalist	J. P. O'Kane	9.25	770	771	773	778	779	-	-	-	783	Eliminated
Belfast Labour	David Robb Campbell	8.80	733	743	748	782	792	-	-	-	1,150	1,498
UUP	W. J. Price	6.75	562	578	632	703	Eliminated					
Ind. Unionist	Alexander McConnell	5.82	485	659	688	762	791	-	-	Eliminated		
Independent	Robert Pierce	4.45	371	393	424	Eliminated						
Labour Unionist	William Lorimer	3.71	309	319	Eliminated							
Ind. Unionist	Emily S. Montgomery	3.63	302	Eliminated								
Electorate: 13,264 Valid: 8,328 Spoilt: 150 Quota: 1,190 Turnout: 8,478

=== Duncairn ===
Duncairn - 7 seats
Party	Candidate	FPv%	Count									
Party	Candidate	FPv%	1	2	3	4	5	6	7	8	9	10
Ind. Unionist	J. Barron		2,238									
UUP	S. F. Mercier J.P.		1,386									
UUP	T. E. Alexander		1,353									
Nationalist	Patrick Dempsey J.P.		848	-	-	-	-	-	-	1,262		
Belfast Labour	J. S. Lawther		711	-	-	-	-	-	-	1,248		
Labour Unionist	J. Bradbury		692	-	-	-	-	-	-	-	-	1,285
Irish Islander	P. Griffith		542									
UUP	E. J. Elliott		500	-	-	-	-	-	-	-	-	1,124
	T. English J.P.		446									
UUP	John Tyrrell J.P.		430									
Belfast Labour	R. McClung		331	-	-	-	-	422				
UUP	Robert Dunlop J.P.		270									
Independent	R. S. McBurnie		118									
Workers	J. Polkinghorne		80									
Electorate: 15,259 Valid: 9,945 Spoilt: 248 Quota: 1,244 Turnout: 10,193

=== Cromac ===
Crawford McCullough (Unionist)
James McKirnan (Nationalist)
T. McConnell (Unionist)
T. J. Kennedy (Independent Unionist)
H. Riddell (Unionist)
Lennox (Labour Unionist)
Jameson (Unionist)

=== Shankill ===
Shankill - 8 seats
Party	Candidate	FPv%	Count													
Party	Candidate	FPv%	1	2	3	4	5	6	7	8	9	10	11	12	13	14
Belfast Labour	Sam Kyle		2,082													
UUP	Hugh Murphy		1,585													
Ind. Unionist	Tommy Henderson		1,210	-	-	-	-	1,380								
UUP	Florence F. Clark		906	-	-	-	-	-	-	-	-	-	1,368			
UUP	William George Turner		988	-	-	-	-	-	-	-	-	-	1,340			
Sinn Féin	Michael Carolan		918	-	-	-	-	-	-	-	-	-	-	1,406		
UUP	W. C. Bickerstaff		848	-	-	-	-	-	-	-	-	-	-	-	-	1,104
UUP	R. Andrews		794													
Irish Nationalist	H. Martin		789													
Belfast Labour	Dawson Gordon		543	-	-	-	-	-	-	-	-	-	1,363			
Labour Unionist	R. Weir		340													
Labour Unionist	J. A. Turkington		293													
UUP	Edwin Squire		227													
Ind. Unionist	T. McClughin		183													
Ind. Unionist	J. Burns		159													
Trade Unionist	T. Jenkinson		108													
Belfast Labour	R. McWillians		84													
Trade Unionist	Zimri Stewart		0													
Electorate: 17,629 Valid: 12,057 Spoilt: 239 Quota: 1,340 Turnout: 12,296

=== St Anne's ===
Alexander Boyd (Independent Labour)
G. M. Donaldson (Labour)
J. A. Doran (Unionist)
Alexander Hopkins (Unionist)
James Johnston (Unionist)
Hugh McLaurin (Unionist)

=== Victoria ===
John Harkin (Nationalist)
James Augustine Duff (Unionist)
Frank Workman (Unionist)
T. Kennedy (Labour)
Thompson Donald (Labour Unionist)
Joseph Cosgrove (SF)
D. Jones (Unionist)

=== Woodvale ===
Joseph Davison (Unionist)
John Graham (Unionist)
Clarke Scott (Labour)
A. Hodgens (Unionist)
W. Macartney (Unionist)
W. Addis (Labour)

=== Falls ===
Falls - 6 seats
Party	Candidate	FPv%	Count													
Party	Candidate	FPv%	1	2	3	4	5	6	7	8	9	10	11	12	13	14
Nationalist	Richard Byrne	16.87	1,655													
Nationalist	Oswald Jamison	14.91	1,463													
UUP	Henry McKeag	13.34	1,309	1,311	-	-	-	-	-	1,316	1,323	1,328	1,342	1,366		
Sinn Féin	Denis McCullough		1,034	-	-	+57	-	-	-	-	-	1,173	1,228	1,464		
Sinn Féin	Demot Barnes		781	-	-	+36	-	-	-	-	-	901	941	1,086	1,139	
Belfast Labour	James Boyle		577	-	-	-	-	-	+52	-	684	809	849	-	-	Eliminated
Belfast Labour	Denis Houston		527	-	-	-	-	-	-	-	667	874	929	-	-	Elected
Sinn Féin	James McEntee		435	-	-	-	-	-	-	-	-	-	571			
Independent	Jeremiah McCavanagh		369	-	-	-	-	-	-	435	487	498				
Belfast Labour	Hugh Gorman		339	-	-	-	-	-	-	-	412					
Nationalist	Constantine O'Neill		250	277	-	-	-	-	-	397						
Nationalist	Michael McKeown		240	323	351	-	-	-	-	542	740	-	785	856		
Belfast Labour	Daniel McRandall		209	-	-	-	-	226								
Sinn Féin	Francis McCurry		168	-	-	-	175									
Nationalist	Felix Kane Jr.		146	218	228	-	-	-	254							
Nationalist	James Rodgers		145	-	-	173										
Sinn Féin	Joseph Connolly		100	-	102	Eliminated										
Sinn Féin	Edward Trodden		38	-	38	Eliminated										
Ind. Nationalist	Michael Cunningham		23	-	24	Eliminated										
Independent	Zimri Stewart		3	-	3	Eliminated										
Electorate: 13,139 Valid: 9,811 Spoilt: 764 Quota: 1,402 Turnout: 10,575

Preceded by 1914 Belfast Corporation election	Belfast Corporation elections	Succeeded by 1925 Belfast Corporation election
