= Power Loom Tenters' Trade Union of Ireland =

Former workers body

The Power Loom Tenters' Trade Union of Ireland was a trade union representing workers involved in stretching linen being manufactured in the Belfast area of Ireland.

The union was founded in 1877 as the Belfast and North of Ireland Power Loom Tenters and grew slowly, having only 146 members in 1880, but 452 in 1915, and more than 500 in the 1930s. It was based at Engineers' Hall on College Street in Belfast, where the Flax Roughers' and Yarn Spinners' Trade Union and Flax Dressers' Trade Union also had their headquarters.

In 1937, the union merged into the Transport and General Workers' Union.

== General secretaries ==
1910s: W. J. McDowell
H. Kelso
S. Millar

== See also ==
- Transport and General Workers' Union
- TGWU amalgamations
