= Bloody Friday (1972) =

IRA bombings in Belfast, Northern Ireland

- Part of the Troubles
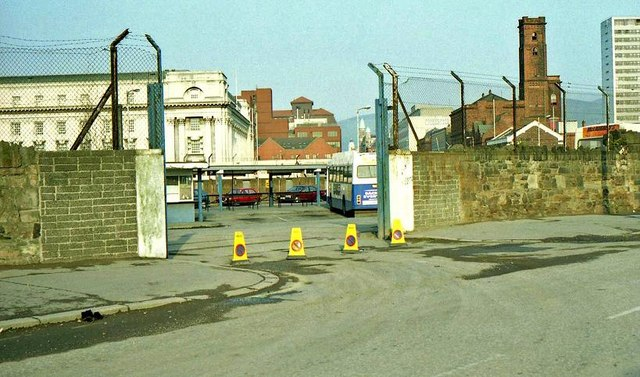
- The Laganbank Road exit from the bus station in Oxford Street where six people were killed
- Location: Belfast, Northern Ireland
- Date: 21 July 1972 c.14:10 – 15:30 (BST)
- Attack type: 22 bombs
- Weapon: Car bombs
- Deaths: 9
- Injuries: 130
- Perpetrator: Provisional IRA (Belfast Brigade)

Bloody Friday is the name given to the bombings by the Provisional Irish Republican Army (IRA) in Belfast, Northern Ireland on 21 July 1972, during the Troubles. At least twenty bombs exploded in the space of eighty minutes, most within a half-hour period. Most of them were car bombs and most targeted infrastructure, especially the transport network. Nine people were killed: five civilians, two British soldiers, a Royal Ulster Constabulary (RUC) reservist, and an Ulster Defence Association (UDA) member, while 130 were injured. The IRA said it sent telephoned warnings at least thirty minutes before each explosion and said that the security forces wilfully ignored some of the warnings for their own ends. The security forces said that was not the case and said they were overstretched by the sheer number of bombs and bomb warnings, some of which were hoaxes.

The bombings were partly a response to the breakdown of talks between the IRA and the British government. Since the beginning of its campaign in 1970, the IRA had carried out a bombing campaign against civilian, economic, military and political targets in Northern Ireland and less often elsewhere. It carried out 1,300 bombings in 1972. However, Bloody Friday was a major setback for the IRA as there was a backlash against the organisation. Immediately after the bombings, the security forces carried out raids on the homes of republicans. Ten days later, the British Army launched Operation Motorman, in which it re-took the no-go areas controlled by Republicans. Loyalist paramilitaries also reacted to the bombings by carrying out "revenge" attacks on Catholic civilians.

On the thirtieth anniversary of the bombings, the IRA formally apologised to the families of all the civilians it had killed and injured.

== Background ==
In late June and early July 1972, a British government delegation led by Secretary of State for Northern Ireland William Whitelaw held secret talks with the Provisional IRA leadership. As part of the talks, the IRA agreed to a temporary ceasefire beginning on 26 June. The IRA leaders sought a peace settlement that included a British withdrawal from Northern Ireland by 1975 and the release of republican prisoners. However, the British refused and the talks broke down. The ceasefire came to an end on 9 July.

"Bloody Friday" was the IRA's response to the breakdown of the talks. According to the IRA's Chief of Staff, Seán Mac Stíofáin, the main goal of the bombing operation was to wreak financial harm. It was a "message to the British government that the IRA could and would make a commercial desert of the city unless its demands were met". The attack was carried out by the IRA's Belfast Brigade and the main organiser was Brendan Hughes, the brigade's Officer Commanding.

== The bombings ==
The bombings happened during an 80-minute period on the afternoon of Friday 21 July. At least 24 bombs were planted; at least 20 exploded and the rest failed to detonate or were defused. At the height of the bombing, the middle of Belfast "resembled a city under artillery fire; clouds of suffocating smoke enveloped buildings as one explosion followed another, almost drowning out the hysterical screams of panicked shoppers". According to The Guardian: "for much of the afternoon, Belfast was reduced to near total chaos and panic. Thousands streamed out of the stricken city […] and huge traffic jams built up. All bus services were cancelled, and on some roads, hitchhikers frantically trying to get away lined the pavements".

Nine people were killed and a further 130 injured, some of them horrifically mutilated. Of those injured, 77 were women and children. All of the deaths were caused by two of the bombs: at Oxford Street bus depot, and at Cavehill Road. The Oxford Street bomb killed two British soldiers and four Ulsterbus employees. One of these employees was a Royal Ulster Constabulary (RUC) reservist; one was an Ulster loyalist paramilitary; and the other two were civilians. The Cavehill Road bomb killed three civilians.

=== Timeline ===
The accounts of the events that appeared in the first editions of local and national newspapers were, naturally enough, somewhat confused about the details of the events of the day. The timetable is approximate and given in BST (GMT+1). The details are based on a number of accounts.

~2:10 pm (Smithfield bus station): A car bomb exploded in an enclosed yard at Smithfield bus station, destroying many buses and causing extensive damage to the surrounding area. Some sources give the time of this bombing as 3:10 pm.

~2:16 pm (Brookvale Hotel): A bomb (estimated at 50 pounds (23 kg) of explosive) exploded at the Brookvale Hotel on Brookvale Avenue. The bomb was left in a suitcase by three men armed with submachine guns. The area had been cleared and there were no injuries. Some sources give the time of this bombing as 2:36 pm.

~2:23 pm (Railway station, York Road) : A bomb (estimated at 30 pounds (14 kg) of explosive) exploded in a suitcase on the platform, wrecking the inside of the station and blowing the roof off. The station had not been fully cleared and there were some injuries. Some sources give the time of this bombing as 3:03 pm.

~2:40 pm (Ulster Bank, Limestone Road): A car bomb (estimated at 50 pounds (23 kg) of explosive) exploded outside the Ulster Bank on Limestone Road. The area had not been cleared and several people were seriously injured. Some sources give the time of this bombing as 2:50 pm.

~2:45 pm (Crumlin Road): A car bomb exploded at the Star Taxis depot on Crumlin Road. Nearby were the houses of the Crumlin Road Prison warders and the prison itself. Some sources say that there were two bombs and that both exploded at 3:25 pm.

~2:48 pm (Railway station, Great Victoria Street): A van bomb exploded in the station's bus yard. Four buses were wrecked and 44 others damaged. The nearby Murray's Tobacco Factory in Sandy Row was also damaged.

~2:52 pm (Railway station, Botanic Avenue): A car bomb (estimated at 50 pounds (23 kg) of explosive) exploded outside the station. There was much damage to property, including a hotel, but no serious injuries.

~2:55 pm (Queen Elizabeth Bridge): A car bomb (estimated at 160 pounds (73 kg) of explosive) exploded on the Queen Elizabeth Bridge. There was some damage to the structure of the bridge but no serious injuries. Windows were broken frightening passengers and staff in Oxford St Bus Station, a short distance away, which was bombed just seven minutes later.

~2:57 pm (Gas Department Offices, Ormeau Avenue): A car bomb (estimated at 50 pounds (23 kg) of explosive) exploded outside the offices of the Gas Department, causing extensive damage but no serious injuries.

~2:59 pm (Garmoyle Street): A parcel bomb, which had been planted by armed men, exploded at the premises of John Irwin seed merchants. The building was destroyed.

Aftermath of the Oxford Street bomb showing the remains of one of the victims being shovelled into a bag

~3:02 pm (Liverpool ferry terminus, Donegall Quay): A car bomb (estimated at 50 pounds (23 kg) of explosive) exploded at the Belfast–Liverpool ferry terminus at Donegall Quay. The nearby Liverpool Bar was badly damaged. Some sources give the time of this bombing as 2:57 pm.

~3:04 pm (M2 motorway bridge, Bellevue): A car bomb (estimated at 30 pounds (14 kg) of explosive) partially exploded on a road bridge over the M2 motorway at the Bellevue Arms in north Belfast. As the bomb only partially detonated, nearby buildings were not damaged.

~3:05 pm (Filling station, Upper Lisburn Road): A car bomb exploded at Creighton's filling station, setting the petrol pumps ablaze.

~3:05 pm (Electrical substation, Salisbury Avenue): A car bomb exploded at an electrical substation at the junction of Salisbury Avenue and Hughenden Avenue. The substation was badly damaged but there were no injuries.

~3:05 pm (Railway bridge, Finaghy Road North): A lorry bomb exploded on a road bridge over the railway line at Finaghy Road North.

~3:09 pm (Railway bridge, Windsor Park): A bomb (estimated at 30 pounds (14 kg) of explosive) exploded on a bridge over the railway line near the Windsor Park football ground. Some sources say the bomb exploded on a footbridge, while others say it exploded on Tate's Avenue road bridge. Concrete sleepers were blown onto the line, blocking it. One source gave the time of this bombing as 2:09 pm.

~3:10 pm (Oxford Street bus station): A car bomb exploded at the Ulsterbus station on Oxford Street, one of the busiest bus stations in Northern Ireland, killing six people. This was the highest number of casualties from any of the bombs. An Austin 1100 saloon car with the boot loaded with explosives, had been driven into the rear of the depot and parked facing the double-door entry into the pay-in and parcels offices. Two British soldiers, Royal Corps of Transport driver Stephen Cooper (19) and Welsh Guards Sergeant Philip Price (27), were killed outright. Four Ulsterbus workers, all Protestants, were killed: Robert "Jackie" Gibson (45), Thomas Killops (39), William Irvine (18) and William Crothers (15). Jackie Gibson was a bus driver and had joined the part-time RUC Reserve just a few weeks earlier He had finished his bus route, the 2.20pm from Ballygowan, minutes before the blast. As he was paying in his cash takings from his bus journey, he was the only one of those killed who was inside the station when the bomb exploded. The other five fatalities were in close proximity to the bomb car. Billy Irvine was a member of the Ulster Defence Association (UDA), a loyalist paramilitary group. Some of the victims' bodies were torn to pieces by the blast, which led authorities to give an initial estimate of eleven deaths.

~3:12 pm (Eastwood's Garage, Donegall Street): A car bomb (estimated at 150 pounds (68 kg) of explosive) destroyed Eastwood's Garage on Donegall Street. There were several injuries.

~3:15 pm (Stewartstown Road): A bomb, thought to have been abandoned on the Stewartstown Road, exploded but caused no serious injuries.

~3:15 pm (Cavehill Road): A car bomb (estimated at 50 pounds (23 kg) of explosive) exploded outside a row of single-storey shops near the top of Cavehill Road, north Belfast. The shops were in a religiously mixed residential area. A warning had been sent more than an hour before, but those in the area had not received the warning and the area had not been evacuated. Two women and a boy died in this blast. Margaret O'Hare (37), a Catholic mother of seven children, died in her car. Her 11-year-old daughter was with her in the car and was badly injured. Catholic Brigid Murray (65) and Protestant teenager Stephen Parker (14) were also killed. Many others were seriously injured. Parker had spotted the bomb shortly before it exploded and was attempting to warn people when he was killed. His father, the Reverend Joseph Parker, was only able to identify his son's body at the mortuary by the box of trick matches in his pocket and the shirt and Scout belt he had been wearing. Some sources give the time of this bombing as 3:20 pm.

~3:30 pm (Grosvenor Road): A bomb (estimated at 50 pounds (23 kg) of explosive) exploded at the Northern Ireland Carriers depot on Grosvenor Road. There were no serious injuries.

Two other bombs were defused: one on the Albert Bridge and one on a road bridge over the Sydenham bypass.

There were also notable IRA bombings outside Belfast on Bloody Friday. In Derry, a 300lb van bomb exploded at Waterloo Place, near the city's RUC headquarters. It blasted the six-storey Embassy Court building and dislodged a British Army observation post on the roof. Another IRA bomb derailed ten wagons of a goods train near Portadown. There were three other large car bombs that exploded in Derry, however unlike in Belfast the Derry bombings did not cause a single injury.

=== Warnings ===
The IRA's Belfast Brigade claimed responsibility for the bombings and said that it had given warnings to the security forces before the bombs exploded. It said that the Public Protection Agency, the Samaritans and the press "were informed of bomb positions at least 30 minutes to one hour before each explosion". Mac Stíofáin said that "It required only one man with a loudhailer to clear each target area in no time" and alleged that the warnings for the two bombs that claimed lives were deliberately ignored by the British for "strategic policy reasons".

The Public Protection Agency said it received telephone warnings of the two bombs that claimed lives, and immediately passed the warnings on to the security forces. It said it received a warning of the Cavehill Road bomb an hour and eight minutes before the explosion, and a warning of the Oxford Street bomb 22 minutes before the explosion. A warning of the Oxford Street bomb was heard over military radio almost an hour before the explosion.

The security forces denied that they wilfully ignored warnings and said they were overstretched by the sheer number of bombs and bomb warnings. The security forces also received hoax warnings, which "added to the chaos in the streets". The RUC and British Army only effectively cleared a small number of areas before the bombs went off. Furthermore, because of the large number of bomb threats in the confined area of Belfast city centre, people evacuated from the site of one bomb were mistakenly moved into the vicinity of other bombs.

== Immediate aftermath ==
After the bombings there was a two-hour emergency meeting at Stormont Castle. It was attended by William Whitelaw, the British government's Secretary of State for Northern Ireland; Peter Carrington, Secretary of State for Defence; Harry Tuzo, the British Army's commander in Northern Ireland; David Corbett, the acting chief of the RUC; and other advisers. Whitelaw announced that immediate action would be taken against the IRA. Unionist politicians demanded a further wave of arrests and internment of IRA suspects.

That night, 2,000 British troops began carrying out raids on the homes of IRA suspects in Belfast. They arrested 58 people and seized bomb-making equipment, explosives and ammunition. The raids sparked gun battles. In the Markets area, IRA member Joseph Downey (23) was shot dead and five other people were wounded. The British Army claim to have hit at least three gunmen. In Ardoyne, at least 900 shots were fired at soldiers and the British Army claim to have hit at least five gunmen. In Andersonstown, two soldiers were shot and they claim to have hit one gunman. Shots were also fired at the security force bases on Oldpark Road, Glenravel Street and York Street. The raids continued over the next three days. More than 100 people were arrested, weapons were seized in Belfast and Portadown, and barricades were demolished in Belfast and Armagh.

Loyalist paramilitaries also reacted to the bombings. On the Friday night, members of the UDA took to the streets in Protestant areas and began carrying out patrols and setting up checkpoints. Four Catholic civilians were killed by loyalists that night, allegedly in retaliation for the bombings. Joseph Rosato (59) was shot by gunmen who called at his home in the Oldpark district. Patrick O'Neill (26) and Rosemary McCartney (27) were found shot dead in a car on Forthriver Road. Another, Francis Arthurs (34) was found shot dead in a car on Liffey Street.

== Reactions ==
According to former RUC officer Jack Dale, a large group of people in the republican Markets area had "jeered and shouted and yelled" as if each explosion was "a good thing".

Speaking in the House of Commons on 24 July, William Whitelaw called the bombings "appallingly bloodthirsty". He also drew attention to the Catholic victims, and mentioned the revulsion in the United States, Republic of Ireland, and elsewhere. Leader of the Opposition Harold Wilson described the events as "a shocking crime against an already innocent population". The Irish Times wrote, "The chief injury is not to the British Army, to the Establishment or to big business but to the plain people of Belfast and Ireland. Anyone who supports violence from any side after yesterday's events is sick with the same affliction as those who did the deed". Television images of firefighters shovelling body parts into plastic bags at the Oxford Street bus station were the most shocking of the day.

Twenty-five years later, a police officer who had been at Oxford Street bus station described to journalist Peter Taylor the scene he came upon in the wake of the bombing:

The first thing that caught my eye was a torso of a human being lying in the middle of the street. It was recognisable as a torso because the clothes had been blown off and you could actually see parts of the human anatomy. One of the victims was a soldier I knew personally. He'd had his arms and legs blown off and some of his body had been blown through the railings. One of the most horrendous memories for me was seeing a head stuck to the wall. A couple of days later, we found vertebrae and a rib cage on the roof of a nearby building. The reason we found it was because the seagulls were diving onto it. I've tried to put it at the back of my mind for twenty-five years.

In The Longest War, author Kevin Kelley wrote that the IRA "had done irreparable damage to their cause – in Britain, abroad, and in their own communities. They had handed Britain a perfect propaganda opportunity – Bloody Friday could not be equated with Bloody Sunday. Nearly everyone was sickened by the slaughter".

=== American reaction ===
American public opinion of the IRA plummeted after the attack, and hundreds of U.S. editorials viciously attacked the group for its actions. The San Francisco Chronicle described the IRA as "a cowardly band of terrorists who bomb pubs, hotels, and barracks, shoot down men at night in the quiet of their own homes and beat up women." The Dallas Morning News stated:

The latest demonstration of calculated, cold-blooded beastliness in Belfast is such that it must shock even the most news-jaded American. Any man who claims to be civilized must look on the bloody work and wonder about the future of the human race.... There are no words to express the revulsion that such an act provokes. . . . Certainly there is no justice here on earth that can deal with the perpetrators. It was an act made more monstrous by the fact that it was committed not by monsters but by men who claim to be fighting for justice, freedom and tolerance.

The attack alienated many Irish Americans who were previously sympathetic to the IRA following the Bloody Sunday massacre by British troops six months earlier. Donations to NORAID (an Irish American organization dedicated to donating money to families of IRA prisoners, but was routinely accused by opponents of using it to purchase weapons for the IRA) dropped sharply as a result. Jim Williard wrote an article for The Christian Science Monitor on 13 July 1973, stating:

[T]he battle cry of "Unite Ireland" once rallied Irish Americans throughout New England – but not anymore. Irrational murders in Northern Ireland have confused and repulsed Irish Americans.... In Boston, tattered "Free Ireland" posters weather in the changed Irish-American climate. Political spirit rarely stirs in Cambridge, once boiling over with anti-British outrage. Extremist fund raisers lack an audience.

The growing anti-IRA sentiment in the United States as a result of IRA actions prompted NORAID officials to contact Mac Stíofáin and told him that IRA atrocities were harming financial support and tarnishing the group's image in America.

=== Irish republican reaction ===
For the IRA, it was "an operation gone awry". IRA Chief of Staff, Seán Mac Stíofáin, said the civilian casualties "compromised the intended effect" of the bombings. Brendan Hughes, Officer Commanding of the IRA's Belfast Brigade, viewed the attack as a shame. He described his reaction in an interview organised by Boston College:

I was the operational commander of the "Bloody Friday" operation. I remember when the bombs started to go off, I was in Leeson Street, and I thought, "There's too much here". I sort of knew that there were going to be casualties, either [because] the Brits could not handle so many bombs or they would allow some to go off because it suited them to have casualties. I feel a bit guilty about it because, as I say, there was no intention to kill anyone that day. I have a fair deal of regret that "Bloody Friday" took place ... a great deal of regret ... If I could do it over again I wouldn't do it.

In July 2002, the Provisional IRA issued a statement of apology to An Phoblacht, which read:

Sunday 21 July marks the 30th anniversary of an IRA operation in Belfast in 1972 which resulted in nine people being killed and many more injured.

While it was not our intention to injure or kill non-combatants, the reality is that on this and on a number of other occasions, that was the consequence of our actions.

It is therefore appropriate on the anniversary of this tragic event, that we address all of the deaths and injuries of non-combatants caused by us.

We offer our sincere apologies and condolences to their families.

== Consequences ==
Ten days after the bombings, the British Army launched Operation Motorman, in which it re-took IRA-controlled areas in Belfast and Derry, but also drove IRA members into the neighbouring Republic of Ireland, where they used the territory to carry out attacks on British targets in Northern Ireland and England throughout the remainder of the conflict. It was the biggest British military operation since the Suez Crisis of 1956. In his memoirs, Whitelaw wrote "The re-establishment of control required a major military operation. Fortunately […] the IRA leaders gave me further propaganda assistance. While the planning for [Operation Motorman] was in progress they unleashed a savage bombing operation in the centre of Belfast".

The City of Belfast Youth Orchestra set up the Stephen Parker Memorial Trust in memory of teenager Stephen Parker, who had been a music student and played the French horn in the orchestra at the time he was killed. Parker was posthumously awarded the Queen's Commendation for Brave Conduct as he had died while trying to warn others about the car bomb left outside the row of shops on Cavehill Road.

== See also ==
- Timeline of Provisional Irish Republican Army actions
- List of terrorist incidents, 1972
