= Abercorn Restaurant bombing =

1972 attack in Belfast, Northern Ireland

Coordinates: 54.5986°N 5.9286°W

- Part of the Troubles
- A victim's body being removed from the scene by members of the security forces following the bomb explosion
- Location: Abercorn Restaurant and Bar, 7–11 Castle Lane, Belfast, Northern Ireland
- Date: 4 March 1972; 16:30 (UTC)
- Attack type: Bombing
- Deaths: 2 civilians
- Injuries: 130

A bomb attack took place in Abercorn Restaurant in Belfast, Northern Ireland on 4 March 1972. The bomb explosion claimed the lives of two young women and injured over 130 people. Many of the injuries were severe and included the loss of limbs and eyes. The Provisional IRA was blamed, although no organisation ever claimed responsibility and nobody was ever charged in connection with the bombing. According to Ed Moloney, an Irish journalist who has written extensively about the IRA, republican sources have unofficially confirmed the group's involvement.

== The bombing ==
=== Telephone warning ===
The Abercorn was on 7-11 Castle Lane in central Belfast and housed a ground-floor restaurant and upstairs bar. It was owned by 45-year-old Bill O'Hara, a Catholic businessman. On Saturday 4 March 1972 it was packed with late afternoon shoppers when an anonymous caller issued a bomb warning to 999 at 4.28 pm. The caller did not give a precise location, but advised that a bomb would go off in Castle Lane in five minutes' time. The street, located in the busy Cornmarket area, milled with crowds of people shopping and browsing as was typical on a Saturday in Belfast.

=== Explosion ===
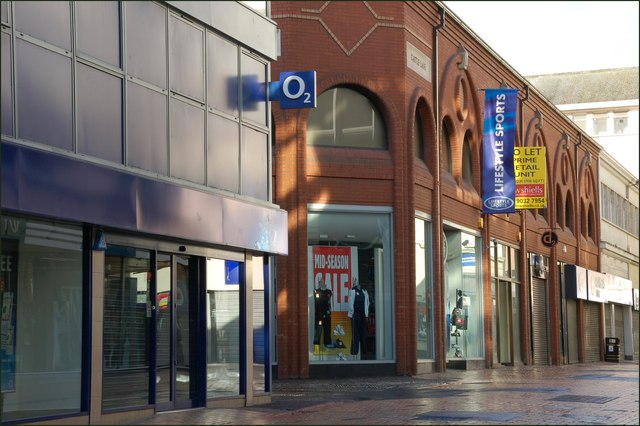
Castle Lane as it appeared in 2007. The Abercorn Restaurant and Bar was close by the spot from which the photograph was taken.

Two minutes later, at 4.30 PM, a handbag containing a five-pound gelignite bomb exploded under a table inside the ground-floor restaurant. Two young Catholic friends were killed outright: Anne Owens (22), who was employed at the Electricity Board, and Janet Bereen (21), a hospital radiographer. The young women had been out shopping together and had stopped at the Abercorn to have coffee; they were seated at the table nearest the bomb and took the full force of the blast. Owens had survived a previous bombing at her workplace. More than 130 were injured in the explosion, which overturned tables and chairs, and had brought the ceiling crashing down onto the ground floor restaurant. Many people were severely maimed. Some had their limbs blown off; others suffered terrible head and facial injuries, burns, deep cuts and perforated eardrums. Three had eyes destroyed by shards of flying glass. Two sisters, Jennifer and Rosaleen McNern (one of whom was due to be married), were both horrifically mutilated; Jennifer lost both legs, and Rosaleen (the bride-to-be) lost her legs, her right arm and one of her eyes.

Witnesses described a scene of panic and chaos as the bloodied survivors stumbled through the smoke, broken glass, blood, and rubble, crawling over one another to get away, whilst firemen attempted to bring out the injured, many of whom lay with their bodies mangled, unable to move. An RUC officer was one of the first people to arrive on the scene. He described the carnage that greeted him as something he would never forget. "All you could hear was the moaning and squealing and the people with limbs torn from their bodies".

A woman who had been inside the restaurant before the blast later told an inquest that she had seen two young teenaged girls walk out of the Abercorn leaving a handbag behind shortly before the explosion. This same woman had been waiting at a bus stop when the bomb went off. A detective-sergeant established that the explosion's epicentre was to the right of the table where the two girls had been sitting. The bomb had reportedly been left behind inside a handbag.

== Responsibility ==
Nobody was ever charged in connection with the bombing and no paramilitary organisation ever claimed responsibility for it. Both wings of the IRA denied involvement and condemned the bombing. However, the RUC and British Military Intelligence blamed the Provisional IRA First Battalion Belfast Brigade and it is now widely accepted that it was responsible. There was a public backlash against the organisation in Irish nationalist and Catholic areas such as West Belfast. The two dead women had both been Catholic, along with many of the injured including the McNern sisters, and the Abercorn Bar was a popular venue with many young Catholics and nationalists.

Provisional IRA Chief of Staff Seán Mac Stíofáin claimed the bombing was the work of loyalist paramilitaries. According to Mac Stíofáin, the Woodvale Defence Association (WDA) had made threats against the Abercorn in its weekly newsletter after the Abercorn management refused to play the British national anthem. The WDA denied the allegations, adding that one of its members had a friend who been badly injured in the blast. The day after the bombing, a leaflet allegedly circulated by the loyalist Ulster Vanguard declared: "We make no apologies for Abercorn. No apologies were made for Aldershot [...] These premises were being used extensively by Southern Irish shoppers for the transmission of information vital to the terrorist campaign...". Vanguard leader Rev Martin Smyth dismissed the statement as fake.

According to Ed Moloney in his book Voices from the Grave, IRA sources have since confirmed, albeit unofficially, that the Provisional IRA was responsible. Moloney suggested that, based on eyewitness accounts, two teenaged IRA girls were probably the bombers. Unnamed republican sources suggested that the Abercorn was targeted because the upstairs bar was frequented by off-duty British Army soldiers.

== Aftermath ==
The detonation of a bomb in a city centre restaurant on a Saturday afternoon packed with shoppers, and the severity of the injuries—inflicted on mostly women and children—ensured that the attack caused much revulsion and left a lasting impression on the people of Belfast. It was condemned by both unionist and Irish nationalist politicians and also by church leaders. Ian Paisley called on the government "to mobilise and arm every able-bodied volunteer to meet the enemy". The extent of the injuries the blast had inflicted resulted in the Royal Victoria Hospital implementing a 'disaster plan' for the first time.

The sculptor F.E. McWilliam produced a series of bronzes (1972–73) known as Women of Belfast in response to the Abercorn bombing.

Unrelated to the bombing, the Abercorn featured in a sectarian attack in July 1972, when Michael McGuigan, a Catholic working in the bar, was abducted by loyalist paramilitaries, shot and left for dead, but survived. He had been dating a Protestant waitress who also worked in the Abercorn, which is why the loyalist group targeted him.

The Abercorn was demolished in 2007.

== See also ==
- List of terrorist incidents, 1972
