= Kieran Conway =

Former member of the Provisional IRA

Kieran Conway (c. 1950 – 13 June 2025) was a former member of the Provisional IRA, who acted as its Director of Intelligence. After the organization called a ceasefire in the early 1990s, he became a lawyer in the city of Dublin.

== Early life ==
Conway was born and spent his childhood in Dublin, Ireland. He came from a middle-class family, and received his formal education at Blackrock College, and was a Law undergraduate at University College Dublin in the late 1960s.

== Irish Republican paramilitary activity ==
Whilst at university at the end of the 1960s Conway became caught up in the then cultural zeitgeist of proletarian revolution off the back of the Paris riots, and was influenced by the activities the South American revolutionary Che Guevara. In 1969 an outbreak of communal violence in Northern Ireland broke out, and drawn to the conflict as a means of expression for his radical politics, Conway traveled to England in 1970 to join an Official IRA unit that was setting up paramilitary operations there to wage war against the British State's presence in the island of Ireland in the form of the Northern Ireland state. His first activities in London with the IRA consisted of taking part in a series of armed robberies of banks to raise finances for the organization. In the early 1970s he attended IRA training camps back in the Irish Republic, where he received instruction in firearms and bomb making, and became a full-time paramilitary, taking part in many gun attacks upon the British Army and bombings in Northern Ireland.

In November 1971 he was arrested in Derry by the Royal Ulster Constabulary for illegal firearms possession, and imprisoned in Long Kesh prison until September 1974. On being released from imprisonment in 1974, Conway was appointed by the Provisional Irish Republican Army (which he had joined after the faction had split from the Official IRA) to organize from scratch a strategic level intelligence capability based in Dublin to assist in its operations. However his brief period in this role was hampered by the inherent parochialism of the IRA, with its different units preferring to rely on their own information gathering resources in their individual localities for their gun and bombing attacks, and resenting what they regarded as outside interference from Conway's role in this regard. On learning of the 1974 Birmingham pub bombings in England, that killed 21 civilians, Conway was "horrified", and left the IRA in 1975 in consequence. (Conway later stated that Dáithí Ó Conaill told him that the "early indications" of why civilians were killed was due to phone boxes not working so the warning that was to be sent to evacuate the area was delayed).

He rejoined the IRA during the 1981 Irish hunger strike, and was active in the organisation in the 1980s before leaving it on 15 December 1993, with conflicting sentiments upon the acceptance by its leadership of the terms of the "Downing Street Declaration" (i.e. that the governmental status of Northern Ireland could only be altered by the democratic decision of its population). In part he regarded the ending of the armed campaign by the IRA leadership as a "betrayal" of its political objective of the eradication of the state of Northern Ireland and the acquisition of its territory by an Irish Republican state, but at the same time he recognized that the IRA was faced with imminent military defeat by the United Kingdom's security forces in the early 1990s, and that calling a formal cessation of its campaign and a disciplined disbandment of itself whilst it still retained the authority of command for the decision, was an act of realpolitik on its leadership's part.

In retrospect on his life in the IRA Conway has stated that, although personally still believing in the political objective of a United Ireland, the ultimate defeat of the IRA's armed campaign to achieve it by revolutionary violence carries the consequence that he "wasted" 25 years of his life engaged in it, and that nationalism, Irish or otherwise, and the Marxist Revolutionary movement of the 1960s–1980s were temporary ideologies that are now of the past. He has also stated that although not renouncing his actions in Irish Republican paramilitarism when viewed from their contemporary perspective, he wouldn't have engaged in it if he had known at the time that it would end in political failure, and that a "United Ireland" is unachievable as long as the Ulster Scots people oppose it.

== Post-paramilitary life ==
After leaving Irish Republican paramilitarism in the mid-1990s Conway studied Law in Dublin, and qualified as a solicitor in 2004, specializing in Criminal Law, later qualifying as a barrister. In 2014 he established a law practice in Dublin. He published a memoir of his early life in the IRA entitled: Southside Provisional: From Freedom Fighter to the Four Courts (2014).

In March 2019 Conway gave evidence at a public inquest into the Birmingham pub bombings, during which he described it as a "disaster", and "an IRA operation gone wrong". He described how the attack had been "accidental" in catching so many civilians due to an out-of-order public telephone delaying a warning being issued to the Birmingham police. He made clear that deliberate targeting of civilians was forbidden at that time by order of the PIRA's leadership.

He died on 13 June 2025.
