= Bobby Storey =

Irish republican paramilitary

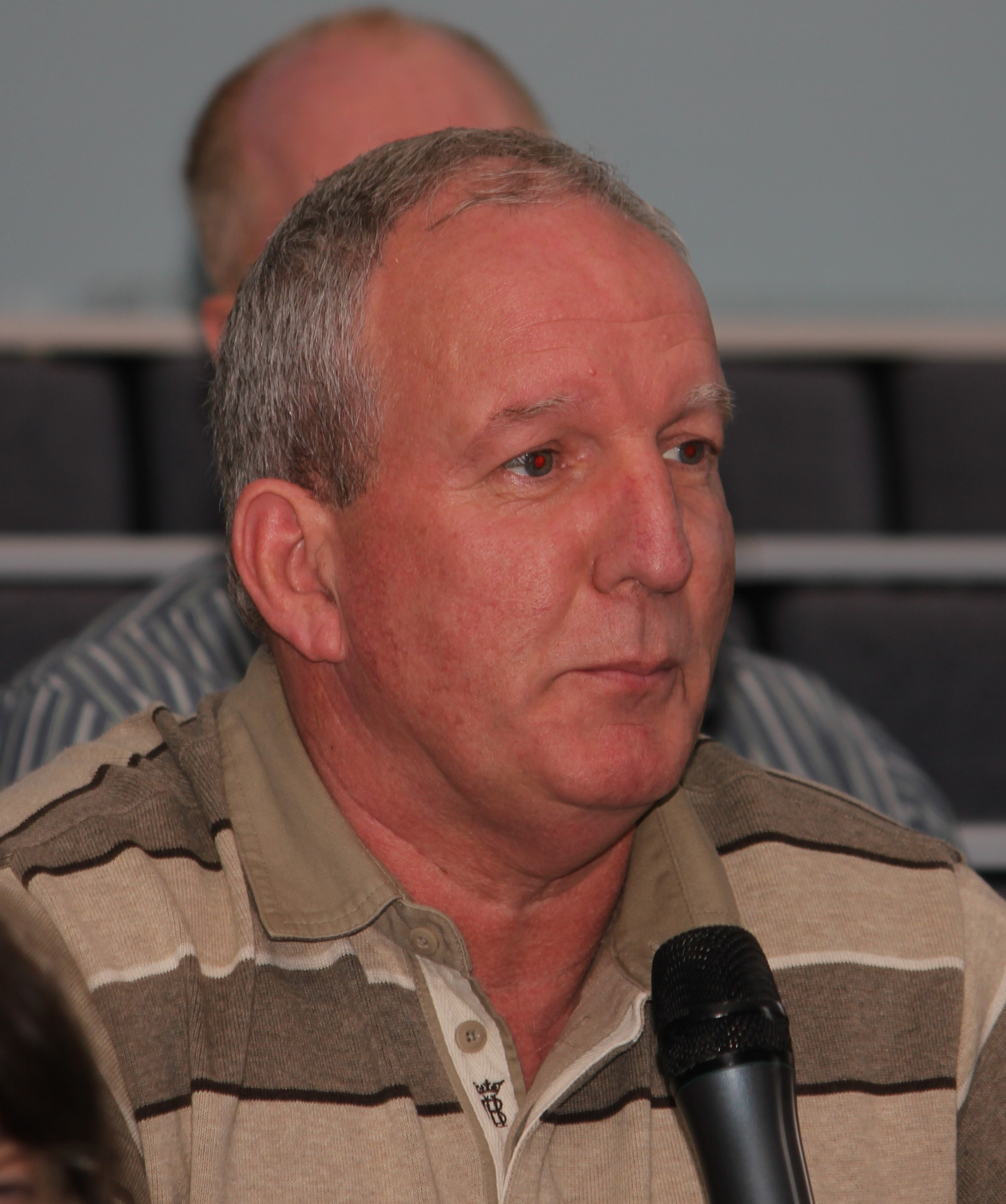
- Storey in 2012
- Born: 11 April 1956; Marrowbone, Belfast, Northern Ireland
- Died: 21 June 2020 (aged 64); Newcastle upon Tyne, England
- Burial place: Milltown Cemetery
- Military career
- Paramilitary: Provisional Irish Republican Army
- Service years: 1972–2000s
- Rank: Director of Intelligence (alleged)
- Unit: Belfast Brigade
- Conflicts: The Troubles

Robert Storey (11 April 1956 – 21 June 2020) was a Provisional Irish Republican Army (IRA) volunteer from Belfast, Northern Ireland. Prior to an 18-year conviction for possessing a rifle, he also spent time on remand for a variety of charges and in total served 20 years in prison. He also played a key role in the Maze Prison escape, the biggest prison break in British penal history.

== Early life ==
The family was originally from the Marrowbone area, on the Oldpark Road in North Belfast. The family had to move when Storey was very young due to Ulster loyalist attacks on the district, moving to Manor Street, an interface area also in North Belfast. Storey's uncle was boxing trainer Gerry Storey and his father, also called Bobby, was involved in the defence of the area in the 1970s when Catholics were threatened by loyalists.

Storey was one of four children. He had two brothers, Seamus and Brian, and a sister Geraldine. Seamus and Bobby senior had been arrested after a raid on their home which uncovered a rifle and a pistol. Bobby senior was later released but Seamus was charged. Seamus escaped from Crumlin Road Gaol with eight other prisoners in 1971. They were dubbed the Crumlin Kangaroos.

On his mother Peggy's side of the family there was also a history of republicanism, but Storey said "the dominant influences on" him "were the events that were happening around" him. These included the McGurk's Bar bombing in the New Lodge, some of those killed being people who knew his family, and also Bloody Sunday. This then led to his attempts to join the IRA.

Storey left school when he was fifteen and went to work with his father selling fruit. At sixteen, he became a member of the IRA.

== Prison ==
On 11 April 1973, his seventeenth birthday, he was interned and held at Long Kesh Detention Centre. He had been arrested 20 times previous to this but was too young for internment. In October 1974 he took part in the protest at Long Kesh against living conditions where internees set fire to the "cages" in which they were being held. He was released from internment in May 1975. He was arrested on suspicion of a bombing at the Skyways Hotel in January 1976 and a kidnapping and murder in the Andersonstown district of Belfast in March 1976, but was acquitted by the judge at his trial. He was arrested leaving the courthouse and charged with a shooting-related incident. He was released after the case could not be proved, only to be charged with shooting two soldiers in Turf Lodge. Those charges were dropped in December 1977. The same month he was arrested for the murder of a soldier in Turf Lodge, but the charges were also dropped.

In 1978 Storey was charged in relation to the wounding of a soldier in Lenadoon, but was acquitted at trial due to errors in police procedure. On 14 December 1979, Storey was later arrested in Holland Park, London, with three other IRA volunteers including Gerard Tuite, and charged with conspiring to hijack a helicopter to help Brian Keenan escape from Brixton Prison. Tuite escaped from the same prison prior to the trial, and the other two IRA volunteers were convicted, but Storey was acquitted at the Old Bailey in April 1981. That August, after a soldier was shot, he was arrested in possession of a rifle and was convicted for the first time, being sentenced to eighteen years' imprisonment.

Storey was one of the leaders of the Maze Prison escape in 1983, when 38 republican prisoners broke out of the H-Blocks, the largest prison escape in British penal history and the largest peacetime prison escape in Europe. He was recaptured within an hour, and sentenced to an additional seven years imprisonment. Released in 1994, he was again arrested in 1996 and charged with having personal information about a British Army soldier, and Brian Hutton, the Lord Chief Justice. At his trial at Crumlin Road Courthouse in July 1998, he was acquitted after his defence proved the personal information had previously been published in books and newspapers.

== Post-prison ==
Having spent over twenty years in prison, much of it on remand, his final release was in 1998, and he again became involved in developing republican politics and strategy, eventually becoming the northern chairman of Sinn Féin.

It is alleged that the March 2002 Castlereagh police station break-in was planned by Storey as the alleged IRA Director of Intelligence. Confidential records and files held in the Special Branch offices were stolen during the raid. It is also alleged that a rogue Special Branch officer may have been involved. In both cases, Storey denied any involvement.

In October 2002, during Stormontgate, a bag belonging to Storey containing secret documents was seized from the home of double agent Denis Donaldson during his arrest. The PSNI had been attempting to arrest Storey in possession of the bag, but had failed to do so and arrested Donaldson instead.

On 11 January 2005 Ulster Unionist Member of Parliament for South Antrim, David Burnside, told the British House of Commons under parliamentary privilege that Storey was head of intelligence for the IRA.

On 9 September 2015, Storey was arrested and held for two days in connection with the killing of former IRA volunteer Kevin McGuigan the previous month. He was subsequently released without any charges, and his solicitor John Finucane stated Storey would be suing for unlawful arrest.

== Death ==
Storey's grave in Milltown Cemetery, Belfast

Storey died in Newcastle upon Tyne, England on 21 June 2020 following an unsuccessful lung transplant surgery. Sinn Féin president Mary Lou McDonald described him as "a great republican" in her tribute. His funeral procession in Belfast on 30 June was attended by over 1,500 people including McDonald, deputy First Minister Michelle O'Neill, and former Sinn Féin president Gerry Adams, but was criticised for breaking social distancing rules implemented in response to the COVID-19 pandemic which, at the time operating in Northern Ireland, limited funeral numbers to no more than 30 mourners.

== Cultural references ==
In the 2017 film Maze dramatising the 1983 prison break, directed by Stephen Burke, Storey was portrayed by Irish actor Cillian O'Sullivan.
