= Flax Dressers' Trade Union =

Trade union representing better paid linen workers in Ireland

The Flax Dressers' Trade Union was a trade union representing better paid linen workers in the north of Ireland.

The union was founded in 1872 as the Flax Dressers' Trade and Benevolent Trade Union, although it saw itself as a continuation of earlier unions which had existed since 1857. Initially, it focused on paying welfare benefits to members who were unemployed, ill or who died. It also paid £5 10s to any member who wished to emigrate in the hope of reducing competition for work.

The union was based at Engineers' Hall on College Street in Belfast, where the Flax Roughers' and Yarn Spinners' Trade Union and Power Loom Tenters Trade Union of Ireland also had their headquarters. It affiliated to the Irish Trades Union Congress and to the Belfast Trades Council.

Membership of the union was already over 1,300 in the 1880s and remained fairly steady, being 1,184 in 1913. That year, the union was renamed as the Flax Dressers' and Linen Workers' Trade Union. In about 1920, it merged into the Workers' Union.

== Secretaries ==
1880s: Robert Gageby
1910: William Rooney
c.1913: J. Boyle
