= Elizabeth McLaughlin (sculptor) =

Irish sculptor

- Born: Ballygowan, Newtonards, Northern Ireland
- Other names: Elizabeth Linton-McLaughlin
- Known for: sculpture

Elizabeth McLaughlin is a Northern Irish sculptor who works in bronze and has provided a number of public commissions throughout Ireland.

== Biography ==
Elizabeth McLaughlin is from Ballygowan in Newtownards, County Down. Very little is known about the artist. When one of her statues was damaged and stolen after Storm Ophelia the local community of Finglas, where the statue was displayed, tried to reach out to the artist. The statue was found and repaired but the McLaughlin was not found for the ceremony to replace the piece.

McLaughlin has a number of well known sculptures commissioned and on display in Ireland. The best known of these are the Countess Markievicz and Poppet Statue in Dublin, the Claudy bombing memorial and the Finglas Mother and Baby statue more correctly known by its title Let the Life Flow Through. Others include a statue commemorating the Famine in Roscommon, a memorial to James Joseph Magennis, and Let There Be Light which includes stained glass as well as the more typical bronze with which McLaughlin usually works.

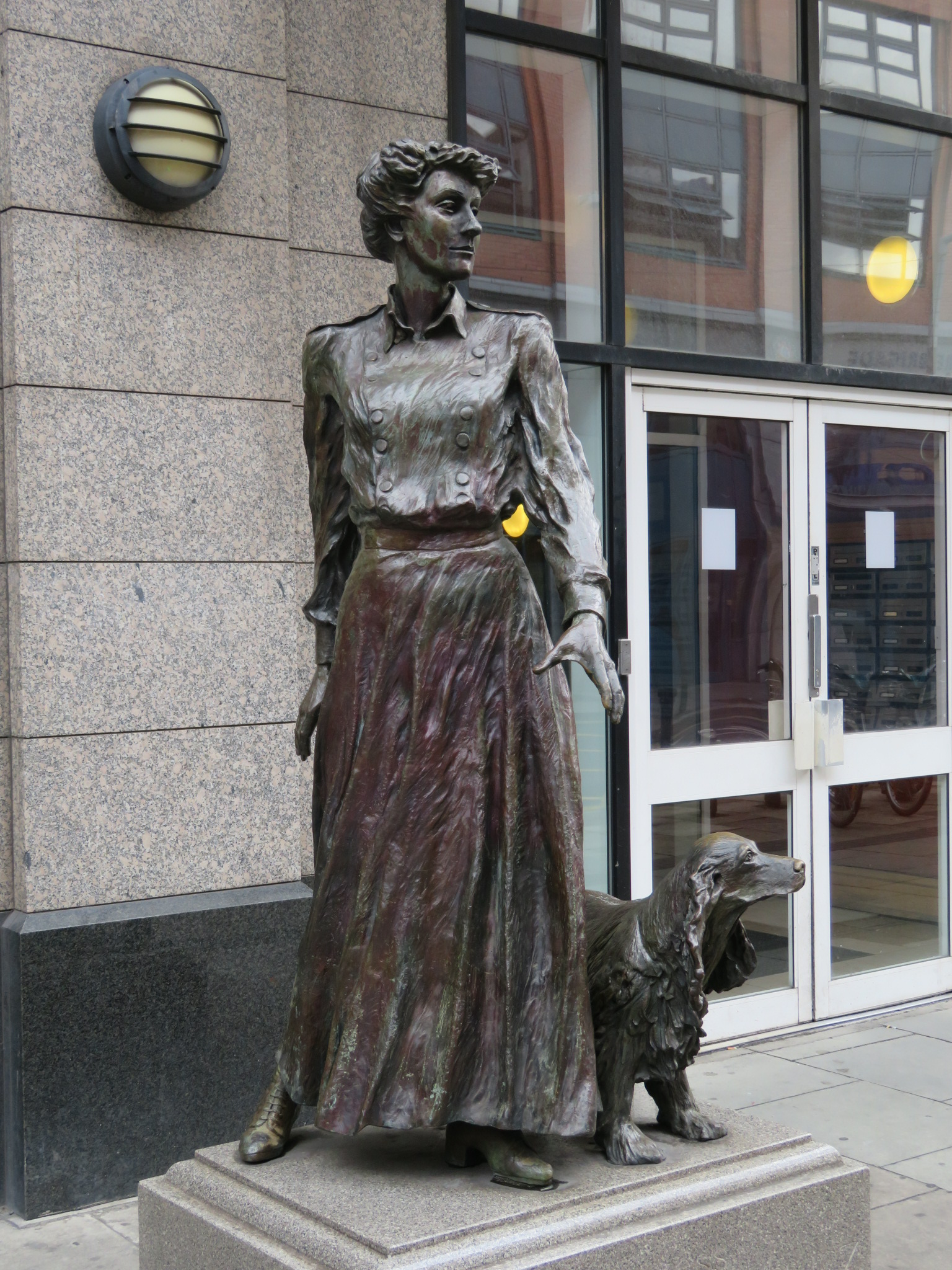
Constance Markievicz statue

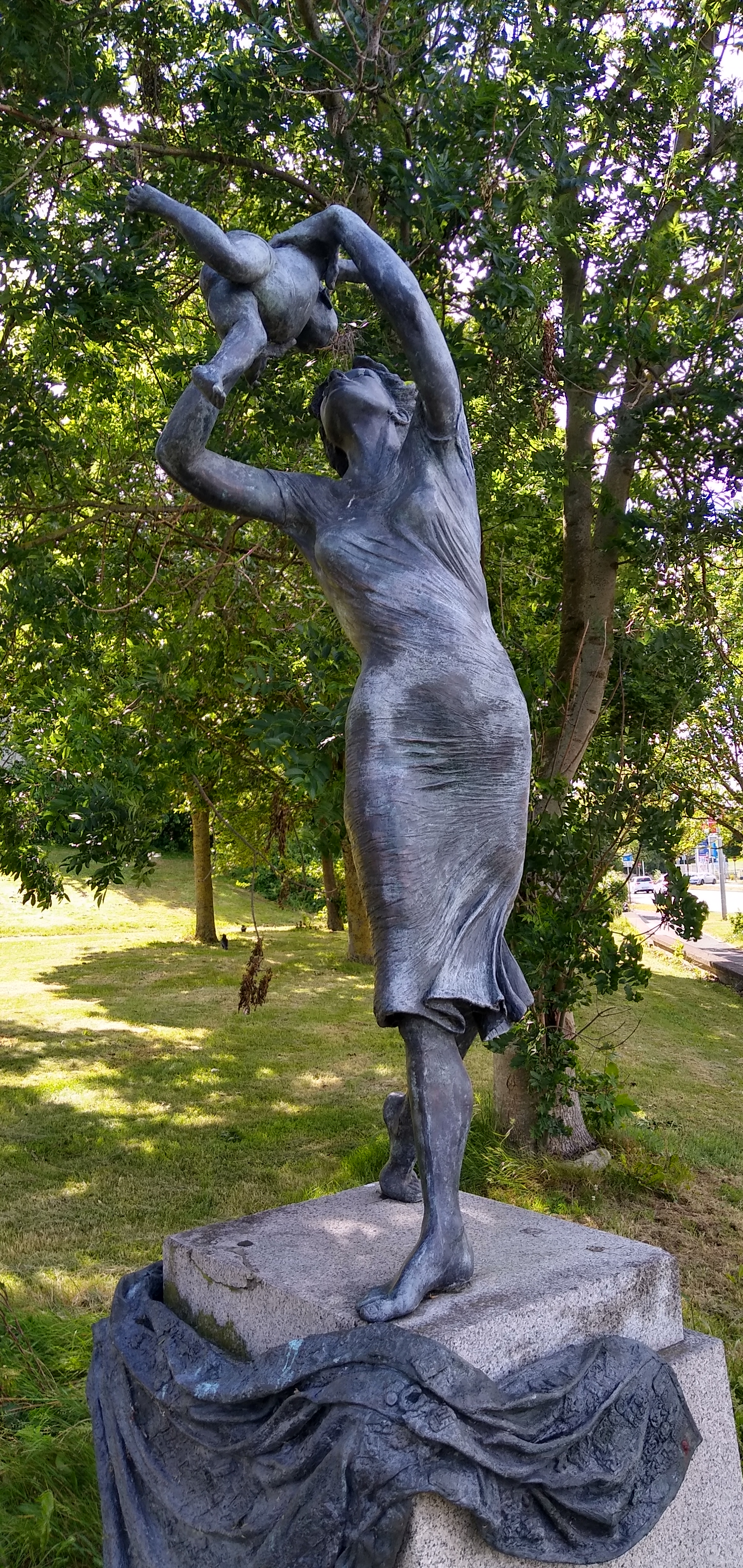
Let the Life Flow Through

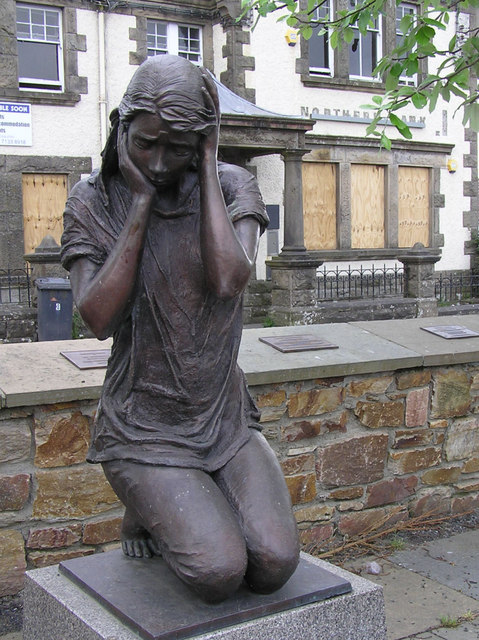
Claudy bombing memorial

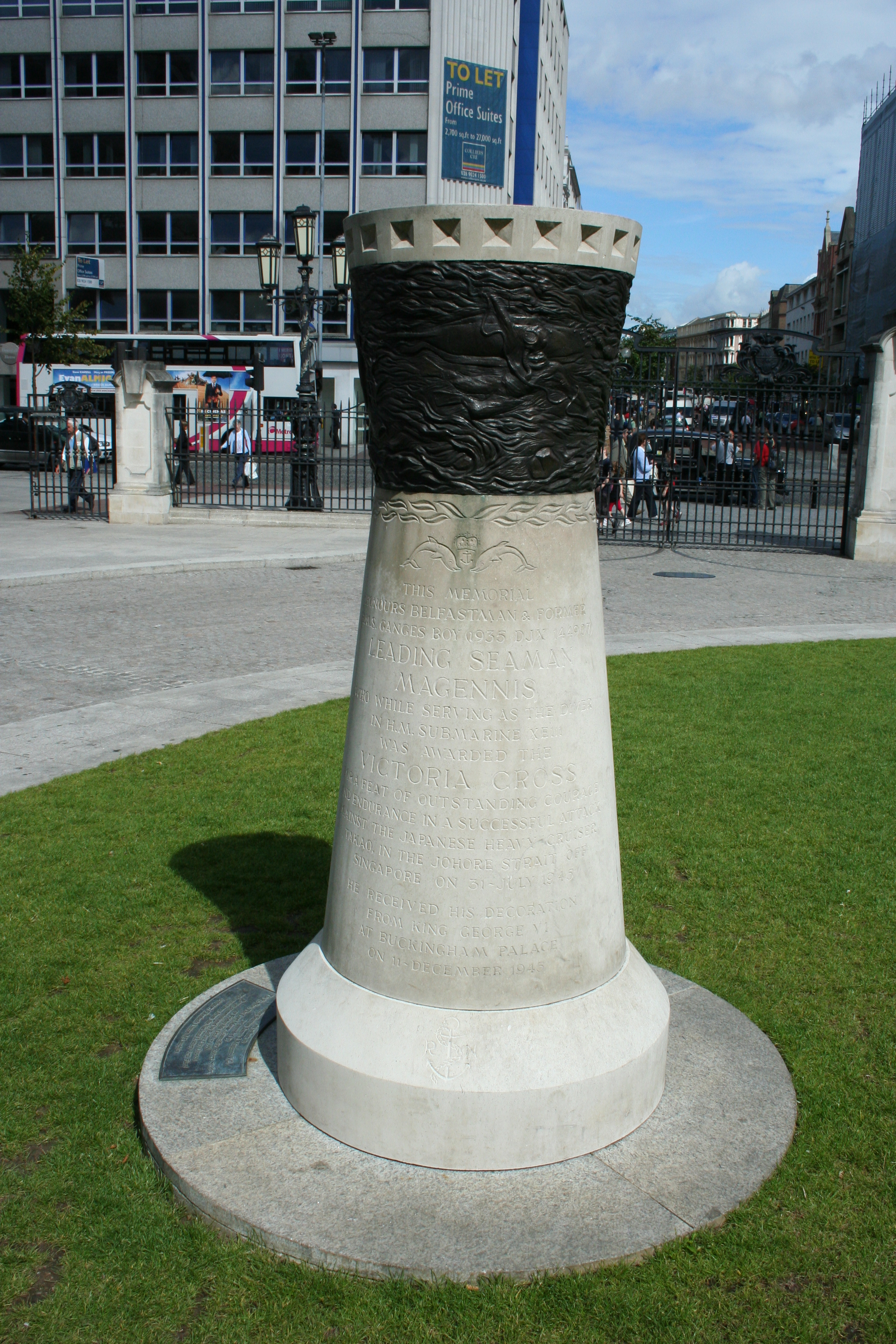
Leading Seaman Magennis VC
