= Michael Carolan =

Irish republican activist

Belfast Corporation Councillor
- In office January 1920 – April 1920
- Succeeded by: Robert James Adgey
- Constituency: Shankill

Personal details
- Born: 1875 Belfast, Ireland
- Died: 1 May 1937 (aged 61–62) Dublin, Ireland
- Resting place: Glasnevin Cemetery
- Party: Sinn Féin

Military service
- Branch/service: Irish Volunteers; Irish Republican Army; Anti-Treaty IRA
- Rank: Director of Intelligence
- Unit: 2nd Battalion, Belfast Brigade; 13th Company, 3rd Battalion, Dublin Brigade; General Headquarters (GHQ)
- Battles/wars: Easter Rising; Irish War of Independence; Irish Civil War

Michael Carolan (1875 – 1 May 1937) was an Irish republican activist.

== Biography ==
Carolan was born in Belfast in 1875 and lived in the Ardoyne area of North Belfast. Carolan joined the Irish Volunteers in 1913, then participated in the Easter Rising, although as part of the Belfast Division, he did not see any action. Following the rising, he was arrested and sent to the Frongoch internment camp. On his return to Belfast, he joined the Irish Republican Army (IRA) and Sinn Féin.

Carolan stood for Sinn Féin in Belfast Shankill at the 1918 Irish general election. This was a unionist stronghold, and he took only 3.8% of the vote. At the 1920 Belfast Corporation election, he was one of five Sinn Féin candidates elected. Following a protest, he was sentenced in February 1920 by the Special Criminal Court in Belfast to six months imprisonment with hard labour in Mountjoy Prison for unlawful assembly and attempting to promote dissatisfaction. He took part in a hunger strike in protest. Carolan's position was declared vacant during a meeting in April 1920. Following his release, he returned to the IRA in September 1920 and became Officer Commanding for the 2nd Battalion of the Belfast Brigade and organised the Belfast Boycott Committee.

Carolan stood in Belfast North at the 1921 Northern Ireland general election, but was not close to election. An opponent of the Anglo-Irish Treaty, he sided with the anti-treaty forces in the Irish Civil War. In May 1921 he was arrested in Galway and interned in Rath Camp until August when he escaped.

In July 1922 he was one of four anti-treaty IRA men arrested in the Gaiety Theatre, Dublin. Carolan was shot and wounded in the hip attempting to escape and he was imprisoned in Mountjoy Prison. In Autumn 1922 he became the Director of Intelligence for the anti-treaty forces, and retained the post in the surviving IRA.

In 1925, he was involved in planning to break IRA prisoners out of Mountjoy, but was arrested and himself imprisoned for a year, resulting in many IRA intelligence papers being obtained by British authorities. Frank Kerlin replaced him as Director of Intelligence. On 27 November 1925, George Gilmore arranged a successful jailbreak and Carolan was one of nineteen men sprung.

== Death ==
Carolan died on 1 May 1937 in Dublin. He was buried in Glasnevin Cemetery and his funeral was attended by then-President Éamon De Valera, Minister for Defence Frank Aiken and Minister for Finance Seán MacEntee.

Military offices
Preceded by Michael Collins	Irish Republican Army Director of Intelligence; 1922–1925	Succeeded by Frank Kerlin
