= 1914 Belfast Corporation election =

Local election in Ireland

- 15 January 1914

16 seats to Belfast Corporation 9 seats needed for a majority
	First party	Second party
Leader	R. J. McMordie
Party	Irish Unionist	United Irish League
Seats won	14	2
- Map showing the election results by ward.
Council control before election
Irish Unionist
Council control after election
Irish Unionist

An election to Belfast Corporation took place in 1914 as part of that year's Irish local elections. This would be the last election before the Local Government (Ireland) Act 1919, which would replace the traditional FPTP based ward system with an STV system based on proportional representation. The election saw Unionists continuing their dominance of the council, winning a massive majority of the council's seats.

Sixteen seats were up for election, with a total of forty-eight candidates nominated. Publican John Boston was nominated for every seat, in order to ensure that they would have a contest. The Falls and St Anne's wards had the most candidates, with seven each. Arthur Trew stood in both the Falls and Shankill wards.

After the election Crawford McCullagh was elected by the new council as Lord Mayor of Belfast.

== Council composition by party ==
Party	Seats	±
Irish Unionist	52	
United Irish League	8	
Totals	60	

== Results by party ==
Party	Seats	±	Votes	%	±%
Irish Unionist	14		12,944	71.88	
United Irish League	2		2,316	12.86	
Independent	0		1,282	7.12	
John Boston	0		1,218	6.76	
Ind. Unionist	0		247	1.37	
Totals	16		18,007	100.00	—

== Ward results ==
=== Clifton Ward ===
Clifton Ward Electorate: 6182
Party	Candidate	Votes	%	±%
Irish Unionist	Robert Dunlop (incumbent Councillor)	369		
Independent	John Boston	56		
Majority		313		
Turnout		425		

=== Cromac Ward ===
Cromac Ward Electorate: 5205
Party	Candidate	Votes	%	±%
Irish Unionist	Robert Thomson M.B. (incumbent Councillor)	549		
Independent	John Boston	75		
Majority		474		
Turnout		624		

=== Court Ward ===
Court Ward Electorate: 3450
Party	Candidate	Votes	%	±%
Irish Unionist	Joseph Davison (incumbent Councillor)	1138		
Independent	John Boston	48		
Majority		1090		
Turnout		1186		

=== Dock Ward ===
Dock Ward Electorate: 3,316
Party	Candidate	Votes	%	±%
Irish Unionist	Dr Samuel William Allworthy M.D. (incumbent Councillor)	484	89.13	
Independent	John Boston	59	10.87	
Majority		425	78.27	
Turnout		543	16.38	

=== Duncairn Ward ===
Duncairn Ward Electorate: 5,568
Party	Candidate	Votes	%	±%
Irish Unionist	Thomas Erskine Alexander (incumbent Councillor)	300		
Independent	John Boston	32		
Majority		268		
Turnout		332		

=== Falls Ward ===
Falls Ward (2 Councillors) Electorate: 4,561
Party	Candidate	Votes	%	±%
Irish Nationalist	John Collins (incumbent Councillor)	1,555		
Irish Nationalist	James Leo McDonnell	761		
Independent	John Boston	91		
Majority		268		
Turnout		1,646		

=== Ormeau Ward ===
Ormeau Ward (1 Councillor) Electorate: 6,893
Party	Candidate	Votes	%	±%
Irish Unionist	William Frederick Coates J.P. (incumbent Councillor)	1,129		
Independent	John Boston	168		
Majority		268		
Turnout		1,297		

=== Pottinger Ward ===
Pottinger Ward (1 Councillor) Electorate: 7,111
Party	Candidate	Votes	%	±%
Irish Unionist	Arthur Stanley Atkinson	1,831		
Independent	John Boston	247		
Majority		1,584		
Turnout		2,078		

=== St. Anne's Ward ===
St. Anne's Ward (1 Councillor) Electorate: 5,283
Party	Candidate	Votes	%	±%
Irish Unionist	Francis Curley J.P. (incumbent Councillor)	899		
Independent	George Park	644		
Independent	John Boston	53		
Independent	Walter Holdinrake	37		
Majority		255		
Turnout		1,633		

=== Shankhill Ward ===
Shankhill Ward Electorate: 5974
Party	Candidate	Votes	%	±%
Irish Unionist	William George Turner (incumbent Councillor)	2288		
Independent	John Boston	132		
Majority		2156		
Turnout		2420		

=== St George's Ward ===
St George's Ward (1 Councillor) Electorate: 3,284
Party	Candidate	Votes	%	±%
Irish Unionist	Charles Hinds	1,500		
Independent	Joseph Tyney	601		
Ind. Unionist	James Mateer	247		
Independent	John Boston	11		
Majority		899		
Turnout		2,359		

=== Smithfield ===
Smithfield Ward Electorate: 2424
Party	Candidate	Votes	%	±%
Irish Unionist	Patrick Dempsey J.P. (incumbent Councillor)	634		
Independent	John Boston	39		
Majority		595		
Turnout		673		

=== Victoria Ward ===
Victoria Ward Electorate: 4593
Party	Candidate	Votes	%	±%
Irish Unionist	Frank Workman (incumbent Councillor)	207		
Independent	John Boston	53		
Majority		154		
Turnout		260		

=== Windsor Ward ===
Victoria Ward Electorate: 5387
Party	Candidate	Votes	%	±%
Irish Unionist	Henry Riddell (incumbent Councillor)	458		
Independent	John Boston	63		
Majority		395		
Turnout		521		

=== Woodvale Ward ===
Woodvale Ward Electorate: 4174
Party	Candidate	Votes	%	±%
Irish Unionist	James Alexander Laughlin (incumbent Councillor)	1158		
Independent	John Boston	91		
Majority		1067		
Turnout		1249		
