= Belfast Trades Council =

Belfast Trades Council, also known as Belfast & District Trades Union Council, brings together trade unionists in and around Belfast in Northern Ireland.

== History ==
The council was founded on 29 October 1881 at a meeting of eleven trade unionists. Their immediate aim was to support an ongoing strike of linen tenters, who were facing a 10% cut in their wages. It was the second trades council to be established in Ireland, after the Cork Workers' Council.

In its early years, the council was dominated by its president, Samuel Munro, and secretary Alexander Bowman. Most of its affiliates were small, local unions representing skilled workers. It affiliated to the British Trades Union Congress in 1882, but achieved little and struggled to survive during the 1880s. It was boosted by affiliations from new unions of unskilled workers during the 1890s. However, their representatives were more radical, and William Walker and John Murphy became prominent, persuading the council to affiliate to the British Labour Representation Committee and run a joint newspaper, the Belfast Labour Chronicle, with their Belfast Labour Representation Committee.

The council was involved in the Irish Trades Union Congress (ITUC) from its foundation, in 1894, although initially it favoured also retaining links with the British Trades Union Congress (TUC). These ended the following year, when the TUC voted to exclude trades councils from direct members, and the council thereafter devoted significant time to the ITUC. By 1897, it was the largest trades council in Ireland, representing 17,500 members in 56 affiliates, and that year, it sponsored six successful candidates for the Belfast Corporation.

The council led opposition to conscription during World War I, organising a meeting of 20,000 people on the issue. It was particularly prominent during the Belfast strike, 1919, when it described itself as a "Council of Action" and largely controlled the movement of goods in the city.

During the 1930s, the council worked with the Northern Ireland Labour Party (NILP) to campaign against unemployment and for improved benefits for unemployed workers. By the 1940s, members of the Communist Party of Northern Ireland held leading roles on the council. In 1965, it organised a conference on civil rights, and with various other groups, it formed the Northern Ireland Civil Rights Association the following year.

== Secretaries ==
1881: Alexander Bowman
1886: Robert Meharg
as of 1893: Richard Sheldon
1890s: Alex Taylor
1899: William Walker
1903: John Murphy
1909: David Robb Campbell
c.1920:
c.1930: Robert Morrow
c.1945: John McAteer
1947: Betty Sinclair
1975:
1980s: A. Hope
1990s: Desi Murray
2000s: Kevin Doherty

== Presidents ==
1881: Samuel Munro
1886: John O'Clohissey
1889: W. J. Leahy
1890: John Martin
1895: Joseph Taylor
1907: W. J. Murray
1910s: H. T. Whitley
1922: Dawson Gordon
1947: John Kerr
1980s Joe Cooper/Liam McBrinn
1990s: Pearce McKenna
Brian Campfield
2010s: Paddy Mackel
