= Belfast Labour Party =

Political party in Belfast

- Leader: David Robb Campbell (1920 – 1924)
- Founded: 1892
- Dissolved: 1924
- Merged into: Northern Ireland Labour Party
- Ideology: Socialism; Trade unionism British unionism
- Political position: Left-wing

The Belfast Labour Party was a political party in Belfast, Ireland from 1892 until 1924.

It was founded in 1892 by a conference of Belfast Independent Labour activists and trade unionists.

Labour ran the Unionist Party close in Belfast North in a by-election in 1905 and in the general election of 1906 with William Walker as its candidate.

Labour won 12 seats on Belfast Corporation in 1920; however, the party later lost these. Suffragette, Independent Labour and Co-operative activist Margaret McCoubrey in 1920 was elected a Labour councillor for the Dock ward of Belfast. Nonetheless, the party came a very close second in Belfast West in the 1923 UK general election before merging with others to become the Northern Ireland Labour Party.

== Ideology ==
=== Position on partition & united Ireland ===
The party found it difficult to sidestep the issue of partition between 1920 and 1922, when the topic pervaded political life in Ireland. In its desire to avoid division over the subject, the party did not directly contest the 1921 Northern Irish election, instead supporting four independent candidates.

The party's attempt to tip-toe the national question was shown in the campaign run by Harry Midgley in 1924 in the constituency of Belfast West. In the Protestant Belfast ward of Shankill Midgley emphasized his Protestantism and his military service in the British army during World War One. In contrast, in the Catholic Falls area he attacked the policy of internment of prisoners and showed support for the idea of a United Ireland.
