= William Walker (trade unionist) =

Irish trade unionist (1871–1918)

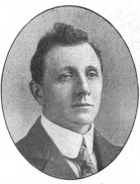
- Born: 9 January 1871; Belfast, Ireland
- Died: 23 November 1918 (aged 47)
- Occupation: Trade Unionist

William Walker (9 January 1871 – 23 November 1918) was a prominent Irish trade unionist and a leading figure within the Belfast labour movement. He served as President of the Irish Trades Union Congress and vice-chair of the British Labour Party.

== Early life ==
Born at 35 McCluny Street, Belfast, on 9 January 1871 to Francis Walker, a boilermaker, and his wife, Sarah McLaughlin. He was educated at Saint George's National School, Belfast.

== Politics ==
Walker became a joiner at Harland & Wolff and quickly became active in the Amalgamated Society of Carpenters and Joiners. He was elected as their delegate to the Belfast Trades Council in 1893, where he led movements towards new unionism, organising both manual workers in the shipyards and female linen workers. He was a founding member of the Independent Labour Party and spoke in favour of socialism regularly from Belfast Customs House steps.

In 1904, Walker was elected to Belfast Corporation, representing Duncairn. In the same year, he served as President of the Irish Trades Union Congress. He stood for the Labour Representation Committee in Belfast North at both the 1905 by-election and 1906 general election, losing by fewer than 500 votes on each occasion. During the former election he said he would, "Make an effort to obtain a redistribution of Parliamentary seats for the purpose of diminishing the extravagant representation of Ireland by means of which the Roman Catholics and disloyal party has hindered the business of the House of Commons." This was criticized by Marxist James Connolly, who accused him of bigotry. Future Prime Minister of the United Kingdom, Ramsay MacDonald, was the election agent for Walker during the same election in 1905.

Walker espoused religious socialism stating, "Protestantism means protesting against superstition, hence true Protestantism is synonymous with labour." In 1911 Walker wrote, "Though I admire Karl Marx, he is not a deity to me," Walker was also an internationalist, stating, "My place of birth was accidental, but my duty to my class is worldwide, hence MY INTERNATIONALISM!"

In an attempt to counter opposition from the Belfast Protestant Association, he proclaimed his opposition to Irish home rule. At the 1907 by-election he stood again, but his share of the vote fell back. However, he was elected to the executive of the British Labour Party. Though he opposed home rule he stated in 1911, "I would give each locality (within certain well-defined limits) local autonomy, and thus develop a healthy rivalry in the supply of those amenities to our municipal life."

As he became increasingly well known in Britain, Walker contested the January 1910 general election as the Labour Party candidate for Leith Burghs, but took a distant third place. In 1911, he undertook a debate with James Connolly in which he argued that Irish socialists should focus their activities on the British labour movement. However, the following year, he took a local government position related to health insurance which required him to withdraw from political activity.

Trade union offices
Preceded by Alex Taylor	Secretary of the Belfast Trades Council; 1898–1902	Succeeded by ?
Preceded by Walter Hudson	Chair of the Parliamentary Committee of the Irish Trades Union Congress; 1903	Succeeded by James Chambers
Preceded by Walter Hudson	President of the Irish Trades Union Congress; 1904	Succeeded by James Chambers
