= Seán Mac Stíofáin =

Irish Republican Army member (1928–2001)

- Mac Stíofáin in 1972
- Born: John Edward Drayton Stephenson; 17 February 1928; Leyton, Essex, England
- Died: 18 May 2001 (aged 73); Navan, County Meath, Ireland
- Burial place: St Mary's Cemetery, Navan, County Meath
- Military career
- Branch: Royal Air Force (1945–1948); Irish Republican Army (1949–1969); Provisional IRA (1969–1973)
- Service years: 1945–1973
- Rank: Corporal (Royal Air Force) Director of Intelligence (IRA) Chief of staff (Provisional IRA)
- Nickname: "Mac the Knife"
- Conflicts: The Troubles
- Other work: Journalist

Seán Mac Stíofáin (born John Edward Drayton Stephenson; 17 February 1928 – 18 May 2001) was an English-born Irish republican who served as the first chief of staff of the Provisional IRA, a position he held between 1969 and 1972. Born in London to an English father and a mother of reputed Ulster Protestant descent, he attended Catholic schools before serving in the Royal Air Force. He joined the Irish republican movement in London in the late 1940s and was imprisoned in England in 1953 for his part in an arms raid on a school armoury. On his release in 1959, he settled in Ireland, rose through the ranks of the IRA, and was among the leading figures behind the organisation's split in December 1969, emerging as chief of staff of the newly formed Provisionals. A committed "physical-force" republican and devout Catholic, he oversaw the escalation of IRA violence during the early years of the Troubles, including the Bloody Friday bombings of July 1972, and led the Provisional delegation that held secret talks with the British government in London that same month.

Mac Stíofáin's leadership ended abruptly following his arrest in Dublin in November 1972, when a prolonged hunger and thirst strike, eventually called off on the orders of the IRA Army Council, was widely seen as a loss of nerve that fatally undermined his authority. He never regained a senior position within the movement, and was formally replaced as chief of staff in March 1973. In later years he worked as a journalist and campaigned for the Irish language, before his death in County Meath in 2001. In 2020, a book by the barrister David Burke alleged that Mac Stíofáin had for years also acted as a Garda informer, a claim subsequently raised in Dáil Éireann and one that remains disputed among his supporters.

== Childhood ==
Although he used the Gaelicised version of his name in later life, Mac Stíofáin was born John Edward Drayton Stephenson in Leyton, Essex, on 17 February 1928. He was an only child of his parents' marriage, although his mother had three daughters from an earlier marriage. His father, Edward George Stephenson, was a political agent, and his mother, Lilian Mary Stephenson (formerly Brown, née Newland), of 81 Maryville Road, Leytonstone, was said to have been a Londoner of Ulster Protestant east Belfast descent. The Guardian reported, however, that his mother was in fact born in Bethnal Green, London, and that Mac Stíofáin never claimed she herself came from Belfast, only that "her people" did. Some accounts have suggested that his mother's Irish antecedents were later embellished by her son. His father was reportedly an atheist and allegedly also of Irish descent, and Mac Stíofáin was baptised as a Catholic at the age of seven. He stated his mother had left an impression on him at the age of seven with her instruction:

"I'm Irish, therefore you're Irish… Don't forget it."

His childhood was marred by his alcoholic father, whom the Guardian also described as having been violent towards his mother. His mother, who doted over her son, died in February 1939, when Mac Stíofáin was ten. Mac Stíofáin attended a Catholic school in Islington, where he came into contact with the London Irish community and with pro-Sinn Féin students. On the outbreak of war he was evacuated to the countryside, an experience that further alienated him from his father, who subsequently remarried.

He returned to London in 1942 and worked in factories and on building sites, collecting books on Ireland in his spare time; on one occasion he entered the grounds of Pentonville Prison and painted the words "Roger Casement died for Ireland" on its walls, in memory of the executed Irish patriot.

He left school in 1944 at the age of 16 and worked in the building trade before being conscripted into the Royal Air Force in November 1945, where he served as a storeman and attained the rank of corporal. He spent 1946 posted to Jamaica, where he later said he had witnessed the poverty and subjugation of the island's non-white population under British colonial rule. He was sent back to Britain at the beginning of 1947 and was discharged in December 1948, after which he became a self-employed builder and repairer; he neither drank nor smoked. After leaving the RAF, he returned to London where he became increasingly involved with Irish organisations in Britain. He first joined Conradh na Gaeilge (Gaelic League) early in 1949, then the Irish Anti-Partition League, from which he resigned in June 1949 after concluding it was hobbled by the Irish government. He also bought (and later sold) the United Irishman, and joined Sinn Féin in London. Around this time he met his future wife, Máire Casey, from Castletownroche, County Cork, at an Irish club in London; they married in October 1949 and had three daughters. Towards the end of 1949 he helped organise a unit of the IRA in London and became its commanding officer. He later claimed that his lifelong dislike of communists as opportunists and authoritarians dated from this period, although he described himself, in vaguely defined terms, as a "Connolly socialist". Mac Stíofáin then began work for British Rail.

== Joining the IRA ==
On 25 July 1953, Mac Stíofáin took part in an Irish Republican Army arms raid on the armoury of the Officers' Training Corps at Felsted School in Essex. The IRA obtained over 108 rifles, ten Bren and eight Sten guns, two mortars and dummy mortar bombs in the raid. The police seized the van carrying the stolen weapons some hours later, due to it being so overloaded that it was going at about 20 mph on the Braintree bypass with a queue of traffic behind it. On 19 August 1953, he was sentenced, along with Cathal Goulding and Manus Canning, to eight years' imprisonment by a court in Bishop's Stortford, Hertfordshire. It was in the run-up to the raid that Mac Stíofáin learned his first few words of Irish from Goulding. He later became fluent in the language.

While incarcerated in Wormwood Scrubs and Brixton prisons in London, he studied accountancy and learned not only a smattering of Greek from the Cypriot EOKA prisoners (he befriended Nikos Sampson) but also "the realities of an anti-British rule guerrilla campaign".

Upon being granted parole at the beginning of 1959, Mac Stíofáin moved to County Cork, where his wife and family were then living, rather than to Dublin, as is sometimes stated, and became increasingly known under the Irish version of his name. This was not his first visit to the country: he had been to Ireland a month before the Felsted raid in 1953. He rejoined the IRA, opposing calls within the organisation to end its border campaign, and worked as a fundraiser for Irish-language organisations. He remained active in the IRA and gave the Bodenstown oration in 1959. Mac Stíofáin became a member of the IRA Army Council in 1962. He was uneasy with the left-wing political direction (under way from 1964) his erstwhile friend and IRA chief of staff, Cathal Goulding, was bringing to the IRA. Appointed IRA Director of Intelligence in 1966, he established extensive IRA contacts in Northern Ireland during this period and continued to voice his opposition to the Goulding line, gaining support among members. Despite his hostility to the left-wing direction, he was prominent in agitations in Midleton against ground-rent landlordism as well as against foreign buy-outs of Irish farmland in County Meath, where he moved with his family in 1966, having been appointed a fundraiser for an organisation linked to the Gaelic Athletic Association.

A tall, well-built man, Mac Stíofáin was regarded as a rather stoic personality who did not drink or smoke. He was a devout Catholic, and was infuriated by an article in the United Irishman, by Roy Johnston, condemning the reciting of the Rosary at republican commemorations as "sectarian". For refusing to distribute the newspaper, he was suspended from the IRA for six months in 1964.

== Leading the Provisional IRA ==
When an IRA special army convention voted to drop the principle of abstentionism in December 1969, a troika comprising Mac Stiofáin, Dáithí Ó Conaill and Seamus Twomey together with others established themselves as a "Provisional Army Council" in anticipation of a contentious 1970 Sinn Féin Ard Fheis. At this, the Marxist leadership of Sinn Féin failed to attain the prerequisite two-thirds majority necessary to overturn the party's constitutional opposition to "partitionist" assemblies. This was despite the disbandment of pro-abstentionist branches and district committees, such as the 1966 dissolution of the entire North Kerry Comhairle Ceantair of Sinn Féin.

Mac Stiofáin was subsequently appointed the chief of staff of the Provisional Army Council. At the Sinn Féin Ard Fheis in Dublin on 11 January 1970, Mac Stíofáin declared from the podium that he pledged his "allegiance to the Provisional Army Council" before leading the walkout of disgruntled members to form what would become Provisional Sinn Féin. In a later interview, Mac Stíofáin denied a suggestion that he had taken the microphone from Goulding to make the declaration, saying only that he had walked to it himself, and he estimated that around forty per cent of those present joined the walkout. The split also ended Mac Stíofáin's friendship with Cathal Goulding, who went on to serve as chief of staff of the rival Official IRA. Although both had been good personal friends before the split, Goulding was later scathing about "that English Irishman". Goulding told the Guardian that Mac Stíofáin spent his time trying to prove to others that he was as Irish as they were, and that within the IRA he felt he had to appear more militant than his colleagues.

The "Provisional Army Council" in the coming months commanded the loyalty of the IRA national organisation, save for a few isolated instances (that of the IRA Company of the Lower Falls Road, Belfast, under the command of Billy McMillen, and other small units in Derry, Newry, Dublin and Wicklow). Mac Stiofáin's men soon came to be known as the Provisional IRA.

Nicknamed "Mac the Knife", Mac Stíofáin was a dedicated "physical-force" republican who believed that violence was the only means to bring about an end to Northern Ireland's status as part of the United Kingdom. In his autobiography, he set out the aims of the Provisional IRA as moving from "area defence" to "combined defence and retaliation" and then a "third phase of launching an all-out offensive action against the British occupation system". He also gave a detailed account of his development of the tactic of the "one-shot sniper". He oversaw IRA units along the border in the lead-up to the split, and is said to have taken part in an unsuccessful attack on Crossmaglen RUC station in August 1969, an account corroborated by later biographical sources.

His military strategy was summed up in his own words by "escalate, escalate, escalate", and in 1972, by far the bloodiest year of the conflict, the IRA killed around 100 British soldiers and lost 90 of their own members. He was separately quoted as saying the IRA "must win" and could not "afford to lose", and that the campaign would continue regardless of the cost.

On 7 July 1972, Mac Stíofáin led an IRA delegation to a secret meeting with members of the British government, led by Secretary of State for Northern Ireland William Whitelaw, at Cheyne Walk in London. Other members of the delegation were Dáithí Ó Conaill, Martin McGuinness, Gerry Adams, Seamus Twomey and Ivor Bell. According to Mac Stíofáin, he and Ó Conaill had earlier travelled into Derry in disguise to attend a funeral, evading the British Army along the way. Leading the delegation, Mac Stíofáin spelled out the three basic demands of the Provisionals:
(1) The future of Ireland to be decided by the people of Ireland acting as a unit;
(2) a declaration of intent by the British government to withdraw from Northern Ireland by January 1975;
(3) the unconditional release of all political prisoners.

The British said this was impossible owing to the commitment it had given to unionists. The talks ended in failure, and as a briefing for prime minister Edward Heath later noted, Whitelaw "found the experience of meeting and talking to Mr Mac Stíofáin very unpleasant". During the meeting, Martin McGuinness reportedly told Whitelaw that he had personally seen British paratroopers kill unarmed civilians in Derry. Mac Stíofáin said that Whitelaw put up his bluff exterior at first, but after a couple of minutes let it drop and showed himself to be a shrewd political operator; he also noted that Whitelaw was one of the few Englishmen to pronounce his name correctly. On the flight back to Belfast, a British official reportedly urged him not to resume the campaign, to which Mac Stíofáin replied that the IRA had not worried about its own casualties.

Following the unsuccessful talks, Mac Stíofáin ordered an intensification of the IRA campaign which peaked on 21 July 1972, or Bloody Friday, when the IRA detonated 22 car bombs in less than two hours across Belfast, killing nine people and injuring 130. In his memoirs, Mac Stíofáin described the operation as "a concerted sabotage offensive" intended to demonstrate the IRA was capable of planting a large number of bombs at once. In a later interview, he gave his own account of the operation, saying that a further 14 bombs had been planted outside Belfast the same day, and that each device had been accompanied by three telephoned warnings. He disputed press reports that eleven people had died, insisting the figure was nine, and argued that responsibility for the resulting civilian deaths lay with the authorities for failing to pass on the IRA's warnings to the public.

On 19 November 1972, a controversial interview with Mac Stíofáin was broadcast on the RTÉ This Week radio programme. He was arrested in Dublin on the same day, and the interview was later used as evidence against him in a trial for IRA membership. On 25 November, he was sentenced to six months' imprisonment by the Special Criminal Court in Dublin. Political fallout arising from the interview was considerable and some days later, Fianna Fáil minister Gerry Collins sacked the entire RTÉ authority.

Jailed in the Curragh prison, Mac Stíofáin immediately embarked on a hunger and thirst strike. He was taken to the Dublin Mater Hospital, from where an eight-man IRA unit, some disguised as priests and hospital workers, staged an unsuccessful attempt to free him on the evening of 26 November 1972. A policeman, two of the gunmen and two civilians were slightly injured in a brief exchange of shots in a hospital corridor, and seven men were detained. That night, a demonstration against his imprisonment grew from around 3,000 marchers into a crowd of some 6,000 gathered at the General Post Office on O'Connell Street, where marchers chanted "We want Sean out". After the failed rescue attempt, he was transferred to the Military Hospital of the Curragh, in County Kildare. He ended his thirst strike on 28 November. His hunger strike led to tumultuous scenes in Dublin and protests outside the Mater Hospital, where he was visited by the then Catholic archbishop of Dublin, Dermot Ryan, and his predecessor, John Charles McQuaid.

After 57 days, he ended his strike when asked to do so by the IRA Army Council. Some have reported that council members Ruairí Ó Brádaigh and Dáithí Ó Conaill ordered him off the strike, arguing that it was "bringing the IRA into disrepute". However, Ó Brádaigh, by this time, had also been arrested. In fact, when he was transferred into the Glasshouse of the Curragh, Ó Brádaigh welcomed him.

Following standard procedures, Mac Stíofáin lost his rank upon arrest. The Whitelaw talks proved to have been the high point of his leadership; his relations with fellow negotiators soured both before and after the meeting, and Martin McGuinness later described him as an "egomaniac" who expected undue deference from colleagues in Dublin, adding that although Mac Stíofáin had served a purpose, his position in the movement had become untenable by 1972. He never again regained his influence within the IRA after his release in April 1973, and was formally replaced as chief of staff by Seamus Twomey in March 1973.

In March 2001, months before his death, it was reported that the tribunal investigating the Bloody Sunday killings was considering calling Mac Stíofáin as a witness, amid speculation among senior legal sources that he may also have held the position of the Provisional IRA's commanding officer in Derry in January 1972, when British paratroopers shot dead thirteen civil rights demonstrators.

== Connection to the Disappeared ==
In 2025, the Redemptorist priest Fr Seán McManus revealed that he had heard the confession of Joe Lynskey, a former Cistercian monk and Belfast IRA member who was later shot dead and secretly buried by the organisation, at Mac Stíofáin's request around August 1972. Fr McManus, who was later based in Washington, D.C., had first been contacted by Mac Stíofáin after appearing in court in 1971 charged with obstructing the RUC at an anti-internment rally in Enniskillen; the two men subsequently met in Navan. In 1972, two IRA members collected the priest in Blackrock, County Louth, and brought him, his eyes closed for part of the journey, to a location where he heard Lynskey's confession shortly before Lynskey was killed. Lynskey's remains have not been recovered; he is one of four of "the Disappeared" whose bodies have yet to be found by the Independent Commission for the Location of Victims' Remains.

== Alleged role as a Garda informer ==
In October 2020, the barrister and author David Burke published Deception & Lies: The Hidden History of the Arms Crisis, which claimed that Mac Stíofáin had for years acted as a Garda Special Branch informer, having apparently been recruited in County Cork in the early-to-mid 1960s. According to Burke, Mac Stíofáin exploited this relationship with his handler, the former Special Branch chief Philip McMahon, to create mischief for his rival Cathal Goulding after violence erupted in Northern Ireland in August 1969. Burke claimed, for example, that Mac Stíofáin falsely portrayed a meeting of the Citizens Defence Committees hosted by Capt. Jim Kelly of Irish military intelligence at Baileboro in October 1969, called to discuss the defence of Catholic areas, as a gathering of the IRA in furtherance of Goulding's dealings with Fianna Fáil. He is further alleged to have misled his handler in March and April 1970 about arms shipments connected to the Citizens Defence Committees, at one point directing an IRA unit to hijack a consignment that turned out to be empty, and later suggesting that a second shipment, due to land through Dublin Airport, was intended for Goulding. That tip-off is said to have contributed directly to the exposure of the attempted arms importation and the subsequent Arms Crisis of 1970, in the aftermath of which four government ministers, including Charles Haughey and Neil Blaney, were dismissed or resigned.

In September 2020, the Fianna Fáil TD Seán Haughey, son of Charles Haughey, told Dáil Éireann that Mac Stíofáin had been the informer who tipped off the Special Branch about the arrival of the arms shipment that led to the Arms Trial, and called on the government to declassify related files. The Minister for Justice, Helen McEntee, said it would not be appropriate for her to speculate on the claims, but pledged that any releasable state records would be reviewed.

Further accounts, including an interview given by a former Special Branch officer in Meath, Hugh McNeilis, to journalists Liam Clarke and Barry Penrose, suggested that Mac Stíofáin continued to supply information to the Garda into the mid-1970s, after he had lost his position in the Provisional IRA leadership. Some of Mac Stíofáin's supporters within the republican movement have rejected the allegations, and Burke's account has not gone unchallenged.

== Later life ==
After he was sidelined, Mac Stíofáin began working as a distribution manager and part-time columnist with the Sinn Féin newspaper, An Phoblacht, in the late 1970s. He resigned from the party in November 1981 after a disagreement about strategy at the Ard Fheis, when a majority opposed the Éire Nua policy, which envisaged the setting up of regional governments in each of the traditional four Provinces of Ireland.

In the late 1970s he met with representatives from the Army Council of the Irish National Liberation Army who were interested in him becoming Chief of Staff of that movement, and, according to later accounts, he himself put his own name forward for the role, though nothing ever came from the meetings.

In March 1983, Mac Stíofáin appealed to the IRA to declare a ceasefire. In a 1998 interview, he said he had urged the IRA leadership some years earlier to suspend its offensive campaign and change tactics, well before the organisation's eventual ceasefire in 1994.

In the 1980s and 1990s, Mac Stíofáin became active in the Irish-language organisation Conradh na Gaeilge. At that organisation's centenary celebration held in Dublin's O'Connell Street in 1993, he was a guest of honour on the platform. He remained a member of the standing committee (Coiste Gnó) of Conradh na Gaeilge until his death. He lived in the Meath Gaeltacht. Visitors to his home were greeted at the front door with a mat saying Labhair Gaeilge Anseo ("Speak Irish here"). He believed a united Ireland should actively promote the Irish language through the mass media, and favoured the expansion of the Gaeltacht through state aid, an ambition one commentator characterised as an unrealistic wish to see Gaelic become the sole language of a unitary state. On social matters he held conservative religious views, opposing divorce and describing artificial contraception as a matter of individual conscience rather than law, while supporting the establishment of family planning clinics to advise young married couples. He also believed the Catholic Church should retain a significant role in education in a united Ireland, while suggesting equivalent facilities be extended to non-Catholic families.

== Death ==
In 1993, Mac Stíofáin suffered a stroke, an event some accounts place instead in the mid-1980s, followed by a series of further strokes in the years before his death. On 18 May 2001, he died in Our Lady's Hospital in Navan, County Meath, after a long illness at the age of 73, though contemporary American reports gave the date of death as 17 May. His remains were removed from Fitzsimons Funeral Home in Navan to St Mary's Church, and he is buried in St Mary's Cemetery, Navan.

Despite his controversial career in the IRA, many of his former comrades (and rivals) paid tribute to him after his death. Ruairí Ó Brádaigh, who attended the funeral, issued a glowing tribute, referring to Mac Stíofáin as an "outstanding IRA leader during a crucial period in Irish history" and as the "man for the job" as first Provisional IRA chief of staff. Gerry Adams, who said Mac Stíofáin would be "missed by republicans everywhere" and praised his role in the "struggle for social justice and a united Ireland", and Martin McGuinness also attended. In her oration, Ita Ní Chionnaigh of Conradh na Gaeilge, whose flag draped the coffin, lambasted Mac Stíofáin's "character assassination" by the "gutter press" and praised him as a man who had been "interested in the rights of men and women and people anywhere in the world who were oppressed, including Irish speakers in Ireland, who are also oppressed". He was survived by his wife, Máire, and, according to most accounts, three daughters.

== Writings ==
Mac Stíofáin, Seán, Memoirs of a Revolutionary, London (Gordon Cremonesi), 1975. Also published as Revolutionary in Ireland ISBN 0-86033-031-1

== Sources ==
- Hunter, John (20 May 2001). "Death of the Englishman who led the Provisionals", The Observer. Retrieved 6 August 2021.
- "Sean MacStiofain dead, founded Provisional IRA", Irish Echo Online, 23–29 May 2001
- "Adams and IRA's secret Whitehall talks", BBC News, 1 January 2003,
- RTÉ This Week radio interview:
- "Outstanding IRA leader and giant of a man in the Republican Movement", Saoirse, June 2001.
- Ó Brádaigh, Ruairí. "Seán Mac Stíofáin – a tribute", Saoirse, June 2001.
- Interview with Mac Stíofáin (likely taken from Peter Taylor's Provos series). Contains details on Cheyne Walk talks here.
- Hanley, Brian, and Millar, Scott (2009). The Lost Revolution: The Story of the Official IRA and the Workers' Party. Dublin: Penguin Ireland.
