= Irish Trades Union Congress =

Union federation covering the island of Ireland

- Merged into: Irish Congress of Trade Unions
- Founded: 1894
- Dissolved: 1959
- Headquarters: Dublin, Ireland
- Location: Ireland

The Irish Trades Union Congress (ITUC) was a union federation covering the island of Ireland.

== History ==
Until 1894, representatives of Irish trade unions attended the British Trades Union Congress (TUC). However, many felt that they had little impact on the British body, and the Dublin Trades Council had twice tried and failed to form an Irish federation of trade unions. Its third attempt, the Irish Trades Union Congress, met for the first time in April 1894. Although some Irish delegates continued to attend the British TUC, their decision to bar representatives of trades councils from 1895 increased dissatisfaction, and the ITUC soon became the leading Irish union federation. Despite this, the new federation adopted the form of the British TUC, differentiating itself primarily by offering lower subscription rates and lower costs for delegates to attend its annual congress. In 1900, the British TUC asked the ITUC to amalgamate with it, but this request was rejected.

In its early years, the ITUC was dominated by small craft unions. The unions of carpenters were particularly important, while the printers and tailors also proved significant. Several British-based unions with Irish members also affiliated. While initially aiming to include the "land and labour" movement, this was excluded from 1898 onwards, as its organisations were not considered to be recognised trade unions or trades councils. Early issues discussed as the congress included the campaigns for an eight-hour day, for manhood suffrage, and for improvements to pay and conditions. Calls for nationalisation were initially defeated, but were passed in 1898. While delegates votes in favour of establishing a political fund, to support favoured candidates, nothing came of this, although the ITUC did have strong links with Joseph Nannetti, who liaised on its behalf with the Irish Parliamentary Party.

In 1912, the ITUC established a political arm, becoming known as the Irish Labour Party and Trade Union Congress (or Irish Trade Union Congress and Labour Party). The political wing evolved into the Labour Party. Despite the Partition of Ireland, the ITUC continued to organise throughout the island, but tensions arose between the unions based in Britain and with members in both Britain and Ireland, and the Irish-based unions. In 1936, the organisation formed a commission to examine the issue. William O'Brien put in a proposal to form ten industrial groupings with no overlaps to negotiate on behalf of workers - in effect, this would have passed existing union activities to ten industrial unions. This and three other proposals were discussed at the 1939 conference, but O'Brien and his supporters walked out and formed the Advisory Council of Irish Unions. This comprised eighteen unions based in Ireland, and accounted for about half the ITUC membership.

The Advisory Council cut ties with the ITUC in 1945 and formed the Congress of Irish Unions. After long negotiations, the two organisations reunited in 1959 to form the Irish Congress of Trade Unions.

== Affiliates ==
The following unions were affiliated to the ITUC as of 1925:

- Amalgamated Engineering Union
- Amalgamated Society of Locomotive Engineers and Firemen
- Amalgamated Society of Slaters and Tilers
- Amalgamated Society of Tailors and Tailoresses
- Amalgamated Society of Woodcutting Machinists
- Amalgamated Society of Woodworkers
- Amalgamated Transport and General Workers' Union
- Amalgamated Union of Building Trade Workers
- Ancient Guild of Incorporated Brick and Stone Layers
- Associated Blacksmiths' and Ironworkers' Society
- Belfast and Dublin Locomotive Engine Drivers' and Firemen's Trade Union
- Civil Service Clerical Association
- Dublin Operative Plasterers' Trade Society
- Dublin Packing Case Makers
- Dublin Typographical Provident Society
- Flax Roughers' and Yarn Spinners' Trade Union
- Irish Bakers', Confectioners' and Allied Workers' Amalgamated Union
- Irish Clerical and Allied Workers' Union
- Irish Engineering Industrial Union
- Irish Garment Makers' Industrial Union
- Irish Mental Hospital Workers' Union
- Irish Municipal Employees' Trade Union
- Irish National Teachers' Organisation
- Irish National Union of Painters and Decorators
- Irish Post Office Workers' Union
- Irish Transport and General Workers' Union
- Irish Union of Distributive Workers and Clerks
- Irish Women Workers' Union
- National Amalgamated Furnishing Trades Association
- National Amalgamated Society of Operative House and Ship Painters and Decorators
- National Sailors' and Firemen's Union
- National Society of Brushmakers
- National Union of Life Assurance Workers
- National Union of Railwaymen
- National Union of Sheet Metal Workers and Gas Meter Makers of Ireland
- National Union of Vehicle Builders
- Railway Clerks' Association
- Tailors' and Garment Workers' Trade Union
- Typographical Association
- Union of Post Office Workers
- United Operative Plumbers and Domestic Engineers

By 1954, the following unions held membership:

Union	Membership
Amalgamated Engineering Union	21,486
Amalgamated Slaters, Tilers and Roofing Operatives	102
Amalgamated Society of Lithographic Printers	288
Amalgamated Society of Woodworkers	16,860
Amalgamated Transport and General Workers' Union	40,000
Amalgamated Union of Building Trade Workers of Great Britain and Ireland	1,980
Amalgamated Union of Foundry Workers	882
Associated Blacksmiths', Forge and Smithy Workers' Society	479
Associated Society of Locomotive Engineers and Firemen	1,483
Association of Engineering and Shipbuilding Draughtsmen	1,216
Association of Scientific Workers	59
Association of Supervisory Staffs, Executives and Technicians	1,206
Assurance Representatives' Organisation	1,201
Civil Service Clerical Association	3,600
Clerical and Administrative Workers' Union	2,000
Cork Coopers' Society	47
Cork Operative Butchers' Society	91
Electrical Trades Union (UK)	5,453
Federation of Rural Workers	1,000
Fire Brigades Union	100
Irish Bakers', Confectioners' and Allied Workers' Amalgamated Union	5,000
Irish Commercial Travellers' Federation	600
Irish Federation of Musicians	788
Irish Municipal Employees' Trade Union	1,500
Irish National League of the Blind	100
Irish National Teachers' Organisation	7,414
Irish Post Office Engineering Union	1,500
Irish Shoe and Leather Workers' Union	3,000
Irish Union of Hairdressers and Allied Workers	411
Irish Women Workers' Union	6,500
National Amalgamated Union of Life Assurance Workers	100
National Association of Operative Plasterers	1,011
National Association of Theatrical and Kine Employees	492
National Association of Transport Employees	3,000
National Federation of Insurance Workers	1,158
National League of the Blind of Great Britain and Ireland	124
National Society of Brushmakers	192
National Society of Coppersmiths, Braziers and Metalworkers	360
National Society of Painters	3,884
National Union of Boot and Shoe Operatives	500
National Union of Furniture Trade Operatives	2,934
National Union of General and Municipal Workers	2,400
National Union of Journalists	508
National Union of Packing Case Makers	50
National Union of Printing, Bookbinding and Paper Workers	1,487
National Union of Scalemakers	100
National Union of Seamen	1,000
National Union of Sheet Metal Workers and Braziers	900
National Union of Tailors and Garment Workers	6,651
National Union of Vehicle Builders	2,000
Northern Ireland Musicians' Association	300
North of Ireland Operative Butchers and Allied Workers Association	489
Pilots' and Marine Officers' Association	200
Plumbing Trades Union	3,323
Post Office Engineering Union	545
Post Office Workers' Union	6,000
Transport Salaried Staffs' Association	4,147
Typographical Association	2,138
Union of Post Office Workers	2,742
Union of Shop, Distributive and Allied Workers	6,335
United Society of Boilermakers and Iron and Steel Shipbuilders	3,656
Vocational Educational Officers' Organisation	600
Workers' Union of Ireland	25,000

== Secretaries ==
1894: John Simmons
1899: Hugh McManus
1900: E. L. Richardson
1910: P. T. Daly
1918: William O'Brien
1920: Thomas Johnson
1928: Eamonn Lynch
1941: Cathal O'Shannon
1945: Thomas Johnson
1945: Ruaidhri Roberts

== Presidents ==
Year	Name	Union
1894	Thomas O'Connell	Dublin Trades Council
1895	John Henry Jolley	Cork Trades Council
1896	James D'Alton	Limerick Trades Council
1897	P. J. Leo	Waterford Trades Council
1898	Richard Wortley	Belfast Trades Council
1899	James McCarron	Amalgamated Society of Tailors
1900	George Leahy	Regular Stucco Plasterers' Trade Union of the City of Dublin
1901	Alexander Bowman	Municipal Employees' Association
1902	William Cave	Cork Trades Council
1903	Walter Hudson	Amalgamated Society of Railway Servants
1904	William Walker	Belfast Trades Council
1905	James Chambers	Dublin Saddlers' Society
1906	Stephen Dineen	Irish National Federal Union of Bakers
1907	James McCarron	Amalgamated Society of Tailors
1908	John Murphy	Belfast Trades Council
1909	Michael J. Egan	Cork Trades Council
1910	James McCarron	Amalgamated Society of Tailors
1911	David Robb Campbell	National Union of Life Assurance Agents
1912	Michael O'Lehane	Irish Drapers' Assistants Association
1913	William O'Brien	Irish Transport and General Workers' Union
1914	James Larkin	Irish Transport and General Workers' Union
1916	Thomas Johnson	National Amalgamated Union of Shop Assistants, Warehousemen and Clerks
1917	Thomas MacPartlin	Amalgamated Society of Carpenters and Joiners
1918	William O'Brien	Irish Transport and General Workers' Union
1919	Thomas Cassidy	Typographical Association
1920	Thomas Farren	Stonecutters' Union of Ireland
1921	Thomas Foran	Irish Transport and General Workers' Union
1922	Cathal O'Shannon	Irish Transport and General Workers' Union
1923	Luke Duffy	Irish Union of Distributive Workers and Clerks
1925	William O'Brien	Irish Transport and General Workers' Union
1926	Denis Cullen	Irish Bakers' Amalgamated Union
1927	J. T. O'Farrell	Railway Clerks' Association
1928	William McMullen	Irish Transport and General Workers' Union
1929	Luke Duffy	Irish Union of Distributive Workers and Clerks
1930	Thomas J. O'Connell	Irish National Teachers' Organisation
1931	Denis Cullen	Irish Bakers' Amalgamated Union
1932	Louie Bennett	Irish Women Workers' Union
1933	Seán Campbell	Dublin Typographical Provident Society
1934	Michael Duffy	Irish Transport and General Workers' Union
1935	P. J. Cairns	Post Office Workers Union
1936	Michael Drumgoole	Irish Union of Distributive Workers and Clerks
1937	Helena Molony	Irish Women Workers' Union
1938	Jeremiah Hurley	Irish National Teachers' Organisation
1939	P. T. Daly	Irish Transport and General Workers' Union
1940	Sam Kyle	Amalgamated Transport and General Workers Union
1941	William O'Brien	Irish Transport and General Workers' Union
1942	Michael Colgan	Irish Bookbinders and Allied Trades Union
1943	Michael Keyes	National Union of Railwaymen
1944	Robert Getgood	Amalgamated Transport and General Workers Union
1945	Gilbert Lynch	Amalgamated Transport and General Workers Union
1947	John Swift	Irish Bakers', Confectioners' and Allied Workers' Amalgamated Union
1948	Louie Bennett	Irish Women Workers' Union
1949	James Larkin Jnr	Workers' Union of Ireland
1950	Sam Kyle	Amalgamated Transport and General Workers Union
1951	Helen Chenevix	Irish Women Workers' Union
1952	James Larkin Jnr	Workers' Union of Ireland
1953	Con Connolly	Cork Workers' Council
1954	John McAteer	National Union of Printing, Bookbinding and Paper Workers
1955	Robert Smith	Plumbing Trades Union
1956	J. Harold Binks	Clerical and Administrative Workers Union
1957	Norman Kennedy	Amalgamated Transport and General Workers Union
1958	Jack Macgougan	National Union of Tailors and Garment Workers
1959	Walter Carpenter	Amalgamated Society of Woodworkers

== Treasurers ==
Year	Name	Union
1894	Patrick Dowd	Dublin Trades Council
1895	John Henry Jolley	Typographical Association
1898	Peter Tevenan	Amalgamated Society of Railway Servants
1900	Alex Taylor	Irish Linenlappers' Trade Union
1902	George Leahy	Operative Plasterers Society
1905	Edward W. Stewart	National Union of Shop Assistants, Warehousemen and Clerks
1910	Michael O'Lehane	Irish Drapers' Assistants' Association
1913	David Robb Campbell	National Union of Life Assurance Agents
1919	Thomas Johnson	National Union of Shop Assistants, Warehousemen and Clerks
1921	William O'Brien	Irish Transport and General Workers' Union
1925	Archie Heron	Irish Transport and General Workers' Union
1926	William O'Brien	Irish Transport and General Workers' Union
1930	Denis Cullen	Irish Bakers, Confectioners and Allied Workers Amalgamated Union
1931	Luke Duffy	Irish Union of Distributive Workers and Clerks
1934	Seán Campbell	Dublin Typographical Provident Society
1945	J. T. O'Farrell	Railway Clerks' Association
1950	John Swift	Irish Bakers, Confectioners and Allied Workers Amalgamated Union
1959	Dominick Murphy	Transport Salaried Staffs' Association
