= E. L. Richardson (trade unionist) =

Irish trade unionist

Effingham Lysaght Richardson (1860–1947) was an Irish trade unionist.

Born into a Church of Ireland family, Richardson joined the Roman Catholic church shortly before his marriage in 1883. Richardson became active in the Dublin Typographical Provident Society, and was elected to the Dublin Corporation in 1898 as an independent labour candidate.

Richardson was elected as Secretary of the Irish Trades Union Congress in 1901, serving until 1909, when he resigned to become the superintendent at the Dublin Labour Exchange. He also served a year as President of the Dublin Trades Council in 1903. In this role, he was able to continue his opposition to Jim Larkin, particularly during the Dublin Lockout. Becoming a fierce opponent of the Labour Party, he lost his council seat in the mid-1910s.

Richardson retired in 1934, and died in 1947. He was distantly related to Iris Murdoch.

Trade union offices
Preceded by Hugh McManus	Secretary of the Irish Trades Union Congress; 1901–1909	Succeeded by P. T. Daly
Preceded by John Gibbons	President of the Dublin Trades Council; 1903	Succeeded by Francis Farrell
