= Eamonn Lynch =

Irish politician and trade unionist

Senator
- In office 7 September 1938 – 8 September 1943
- Constituency: Labour Panel

Personal details
- Political party: Labour Party

Eamonn Lynch was an Irish Labour Party politician, barrister and trade union official. He was the General Secretary of the Irish Trades Union Congress in 1928.

He was elected to Seanad Éireann in 1938 on the Labour Panel. He did not contest the 1943 Seanad election.

Trade union offices
Preceded by Thomas Johnson	Secretary of the Irish Trades Union Congress; 1928–1941	Succeeded by Cathal O'Shannon
