= Thomas Foran =

Irish trade unionist and politician (1883–1951)

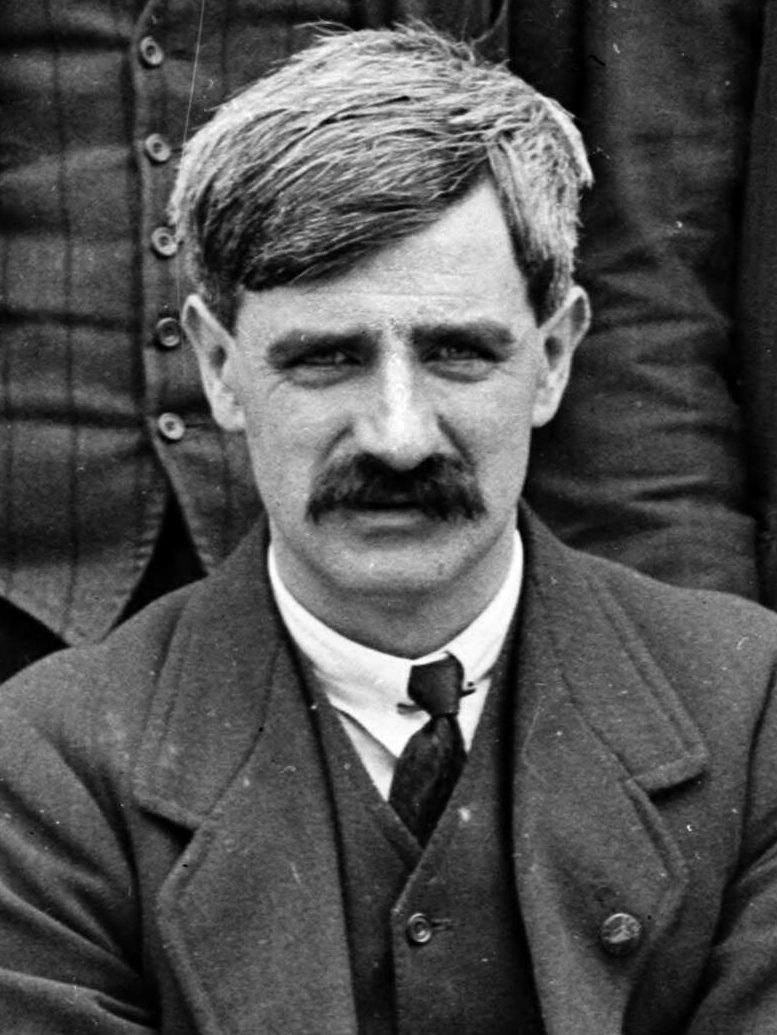
- Foran in 1918

Senator
- In office 18 August 1944 – 21 April 1948
- Constituency: Nominated by the Taoiseach
- In office 7 September 1938 – 18 August 1944
- Constituency: Labour Panel

Senator
- In office 28 November 1923 – 29 May 1936

Personal details
- Born: 26 January 1883 Dublin, Ireland
- Died: 18 April 1951 (aged 68) Dublin, Ireland
- Party: Labour Party

Thomas Foran (26 January 1883 – 18 March 1951) was an Irish Labour Party politician and trade union official. He was a member of Seanad Éireann from 1923 to 1936, and from 1938 to 1948.

He was President of the Irish Transport and General Workers' Union and served as the president of the Irish Trades Union Congress in 1921. He was first elected to the Free State Seanad at a by-election on 28 November 1923 to fill the vacancy caused by the death of Thomas MacPartlin. He was re-elected for a 12-year term at the 1925 Seanad election and served until the Free State Seanad was abolished in 1936.

At the 1938 and 1943 elections, he was elected by the Labour Panel. In 1944 he was nominated by the Taoiseach. He did not contest the 1948 Seanad election.

Trade union offices
Preceded by T. Boyle	Secretary of the Dublin Council of Trade Unions; 1918	Succeeded by E. O'Carroll
Preceded by Thomas Farren	President of the Irish Trades Union Congress; 1921	Succeeded by Cathal O'Shannon
