= Peter Tevenan =

Irish-British trade unionist and politician (1857–1943)

Peter Joseph Tevenan (20 June 1857 – 11 April 1943) was an Irish-British trade unionist and politician.

Born in County Galway, Tevenan moved with his family to Liverpool when he was a young child. The family then settled in Chesterfield, Derbyshire where he worked first making pottery, then spent time as a miner, before finding work on the railways. Initially, he was a porter, then plate-layer, before becoming a signalman, and finally a station-master.

A supporter of trade unionism, Tevenan became active in the Amalgamated Society of Railway Servants, and served on its executive committee from 1891 to 1893. He was prominent in two strikes in Kingston-upon-Hull, one in 1890 among goodsworkers, and one in 1892 involving dockers. He became secretary of the union's operations in Ireland, and in 1896 convinced the Irish Trades Union Congress (ITUC) to convene a committee, chaired by himself, to consider whether a national federation of trade unions could be established. In 1900 and 1901, Tevenan served as treasurer of the ITUC.

After spending a period as an insurance agent and running to become an elected auditor in Stockport, in 1905 he found work as joint organiser of the Municipal Employees' Association (MEA), later becoming the union's North East District Secretary.

In 1906, Tevenan fell out with the MEA's general secretary, Albin Taylor, who dismissed him. Tevenan felt that Taylor's action was unwarranted, and was able to convince a majority of the MEA's members of this. They voted to suspend Taylor and reinstate Tevenan. Taylor responded by resigning and setting up the rival National Union of Corporation Workers, while Tevenan was reinstated.

In 1913, Tevenan was elected as general secretary of the MEA. Membership grew rapidly under his leadership, reaching a peak of 70,000. He was also active in the Public Services International, serving as its president for twelve years. He supported the merger of unions representing municipal workers; he took a leading role in the negotiations which formed the National Union of General and Municipal Workers in 1924. The MEA merged into the new union, and Tevenan served as one of its first two joint assistant general secretaries, and head of its municipal department.

Tevenan was active in the Labour Party. At the 1918 United Kingdom general election, he stood as its candidate in Liverpool Edge Hill, taking second place with 36.2% of the vote. In 1924/25, he served on the party's National Executive Committee.

Tevenan retired in 1932 and died on 11 April 1943, at the age of 85.

Trade union offices
Preceded by Hugh McManus	Chair of the Parliamentary Committee of the Irish Trades Union Congress; 1895–1896	Succeeded by James McCarron
Preceded by J. H. Jolly	Treasurer of the Irish Trades Union Congress; 1900–1901	Succeeded by Alex Taylor
Preceded by Richard Davies	General Secretary of the Municipal Employees' Association; 1913–1924	Succeeded by Position abolished
Preceded by New position	President of the International Secretariat of the Workers in Public Services; 1920–1932	Succeeded by Charles Dukes
Preceded by New position	Assistant General Secretary of the National Union of General and Municipal Workers; 1924–1932; With: Ralph Spence	Succeeded by Ralph Spence
