= E. W. Stewart =

Trade unionist and politician

Edward W. Stewart was an Irish trade unionist and politician.

Stewart began his working life as an apprentice tailor in Dublin, but later moved to become a warehouse assistant at a tailors on Grafton Street.

Stewart was an early member of James Connolly's Irish Socialist Republican Party (ISRP). He was briefly the party's secretary, in late 1898, and was the ISRP's first candidate for election, standing unsuccessfully in 1899 in the North ward for Dublin Corporation. He again missed out on election in 1900, by which time he was managing editor of the ISRP newspaper, the Workers' Republic. He was disqualified in 1901, Murtagh Lyng being nominated in his place, but stood again in 1902, and in 1903 in the aldermanic election, but was never elected.

In 1900, Stewart was a delegate to the Socialist International in Paris, representing the ISRP. He claimed that he had secured a seat by threatening to disrupt proceedings by speaking Irish. In 1900, he became the Dublin organiser of the Shop Assistants Union, although he found little success in recruiting to the union.

By February 1903, the ISRP was in debt. Stewart was again serving as its secretary, and Connolly objected to his management of the finances; in particular, prioritising paying bar bills ahead of rent and printing costs. Connolly offered his resignation which, to his surprise, was accepted. The matter was largely resolved in Connolly's favour within a fortnight, and a motion that Stewart be expelled fell by only a single vote. Stewart then resigned, along with William O'Brien, Tom Lyng and John Mulray. Connolly attempted to persuade the others to rejoin, but not Stewart, who he believed had hoped to move the party to reformism. Instead, they all joined Stewart's new "Socialist Labour Party of Ireland", which he hoped would build links with the newly founded British Socialist Labour Party (SLP). The following year, on the initiative of the SLP, Stewart's group merged with the ISRP, to form the Socialist Party of Ireland, and Stewart dropped out of activity.

He served as treasurer of the Irish Trades Union Congress (ITUC) from 1905 until 1909. In 1909, he moved that rival James Larkin be expelled from the ITUC, which was passed. Around this time, he briefly served as secretary of the ITUC. However, in 1910, he was refused permission to attend the ITUC, as he was no longer a member of an affiliated union. Connolly's newspaper, The Harp, described the proceedings in a manner to which Stewart objected, and he sued for libel, the first of four such actions.

Stewart also maintained his dispute with Larkin; in 1912, he petitioned for Larkin's election to the Dublin Corporation to be overturned on the grounds that Larkin had been declared bankrupt and previously convicted of crimes. That year, he became the election agent for the United Irish League, and in this post, opposed the workers in the Dublin Lock-out, spreading rumours that organiser Larkin was being paid by the Orange Order. He condemned Larkin in his booklet The History of Larkinism in Ireland

Party political offices
Preceded by James Connolly	Secretary of the Irish Socialist Republican Party; 1898	Succeeded by Murtagh Lyng
Trade union offices
Preceded by George Leahy	Treasurer of the Irish Trades Union Congress; 1905–1909	Succeeded by Michael O'Lehane
