= Richard Davies (trade unionist) =

Welsh trade unionist and political activist

General Secretary of the Municipal Employees' Association
- In office 1908–1913

President of the Navvies, Bricklayers' Labourers and General Labourers' Union
- In office 1897–1899

Personal details
- Born: 1862; South Wales
- Died: February 1938 (aged 75)
- Political party: Labour

W. Richard Davies (1862 – February 1938) was a Welsh trade unionist and political activist. The president of one union, and general secretary of another, he also served as a city councillor and contested numerous Parliamentary elections.

== Biography ==
Born in South Wales, Davies worked as a shop assistant in Cardiff for a couple of years, then became a journalist, focusing on reporting the labour movement. By 1897, he was an organiser for the Navvies, Bricklayers' Labourers and General Labourers' Union based at Barry. He was imprisoned for six weeks after being convicted of intimidating a strikebreaker. He retained the backing of the union, and after his release, was elected as its president. In 1898, Davies moved to Leicester, to become the Midland Counties organiser of the Navvies' Union. However, the union's general secretary, John Ward, refused to allow him to see the union's books. Davies took Ward to court, but Ward did not attend, and the union's executive committee expelled Davies from the union.

Davies won election as a Labour Party member of Leicester City Council. In 1904, he was appointed as the first full-time organiser of the Municipal Employees' Association, while also serving as one of its district secretaries. In 1907, the union's general secretary, Albin Taylor resigned and set up the rival National Union of Corporation Workers. Davies was elected to replace him, and managed to increase the membership of the union. In 1908, the union selected him as a Prospective Parliamentary Candidate, once a suitable constituency was located, but no seat was found, and he stood down as general secretary of the union in 1913.

Davies moved to Plymouth and became a builder. He was selected by the Labour Party to contest the 1921 Hastings by-election. He took second place, and stood again in the 1922 and 1923 United Kingdom general elections. He next stood in the 1928 Tavistock by-election, and contested the seat again in the 1929 and 1931 United Kingdom general elections. In 1933, he gave a speech in the town which the Western Morning News reported as being anti-semitic. The Labour Party's national leadership rebuked him for this, but he maintained his position and was therefore dropped as a candidate.

In February 1938, Davies suffered a fall, and died from resulting complications, aged 75.

Trade union offices
Preceded by John Ward	President of the Navvies, Bricklayers' Labourers and General Labourers' Union; 1897–1899	Succeeded by Position abolished?
Preceded by Albin Taylor	General Secretary of the Municipal Employees' Association; 1908–1913	Succeeded by Peter Tevenan
