= David Robb Campbell =

Trade unionist from Northern Ireland

David Robb Campbell (1874 or 1875 – 14 January 1934), often known as Davy Campbell, was a trade unionist based in Belfast.

Campbell grew up in a Protestant family in Belfast. He became a socialist, joining the Independent Labour Party (ILP) and the Belfast Socialist Society. He became increasingly at odds with William Walker, the leading member of the Belfast Labour Representation Committee as, unlike Walker, Campbell supported Irish independence and preferred to work with the Dublin-based labour movement, rather than the London-based one. As a result, in 1910, Campbell joined James Connolly's Socialist Party of Ireland, and when Connolly moved to Belfast in 1911, the two worked closely together.

Campbell worked for many years for the Royal Liver Friendly Society. He became the president of the Belfast branch of the National Union of Life Assurance Agents, and was elected to the Belfast Trades Council in 1906, serving as its president in 1909. In the same year, he was elected to the Parliamentary Committee of the Irish Trades Union Congress (ITUC), and in 1911, he served as its president. Following his year as president, he became treasurer of the organisation, serving until 1918. In 1916, most of the leadership of the ITUC was arrested due to the imposition of martial law. As one of the few prominent figures who was still free, Campbell worked with Thomas Johnson to run the organisation, lobbying David Lloyd George to free their colleagues, and opposing conscription in Ireland.

In 1912, Campbell attended the Socialist Unity conference, organised by Connolly, and supported the merger of much of the Northern Ireland-based ILP with the Socialist Party, to form a new "Independent Labour Party of Ireland", although this only lasted two years before dissolving. Campbell, Johnson and Danny McDevitt convinced the Belfast Trades Council to back the ITUC's new political levy, which established the Irish Labour Party, and it was under this label that Campbell gave anti-war speeches and opposed the expulsion of Catholic workers from the shipyards. However, he was very disappointed that the party stood aside at the 1918 general election, giving implicit backing to Sinn Féin. He withdrew from the party and instead associated with the Belfast Labour Party.

Campbell stood for the Belfast Labour Party at the 1920 Belfast Corporation election, and was elected, becoming leader of the group and of the opposition on the council. He called a council meeting to debate expulsion of Catholic workers, but attempted to call the meeting off following threats from loyalists. The meeting went ahead, but the Labour councillors did not attend, and they lost support from all sides as a result.

In 1928, Campbell qualified as a barrister, but was disappointed that he failed to pick up cases from trade unions.

Trade union offices
Preceded by James McCarron	President of the Irish Trades Union Congress; 1911	Succeeded by Michael O'Lehane
Preceded by Michael O'Lehane	Treasurer of the Irish Trades Union Congress; 1913–1918	Succeeded by Thomas Johnson
