= Marie Johnson (suffragist) =

Suffragist organiser, teacher, trade unionist and activist

- Born: Marie Annie Tregay; 24 December 1874; Truro, Cornwall, England
- Died: 12 July 1974 (aged 99); Dublin, Ireland
- Spouse: Thomas Johnson (m. 1898; died 1963)
- Children: 1

Marie Annie Johnson (née Tregay; 24 December 1874 – 12 July 1974), was an Irish trade unionist, suffragist and teacher.

== Personal life ==
Johnson was born in Truro, Cornwall, on 24 December 1874. Her father was James Tregay, a miner, who was blinded as a young man and ended up becoming a basket weaver. He believed in Irish home rule. Johnson was educated in Whitelands College in Chelsea, London, qualifying in 1894 as a teacher. She went to work in St. Multose's National school, Kinsale. There she met Thomas Johnson. She married him in Liverpool in 1898. He had worked in Kinsale where he met Johnson but went on to take a job that moved him with his family to Belfast. They had one son, actor Thomas James Frederick Johnson, in 1899. Both of them became involved in trade unionism. Her husband went on to become the leader of the Irish Labour Party, a TD and a Senator.

== Activism ==
Together the couple worked to unionise the Belfast Mill Workers. Johnson worked closely with Winifred Carney and introduced her to James Connolly. She had been secretary of the Textile Workers' Union, but when she became ill she recommended Carney for the role. Later she became the leader of the Irish Women Workers' Union. She was an enthusiastic supporter of the Women's Social and Political Union. When Carney stood for election as a Sinn Féin candidate, Johnson was part of her campaign executive. In 1913, Johnson was active fundraising to support the victims of the Dublin lock-out. She was involved in the peace negotiations of the Irish Civil War. Johnson represented Ireland during the 4th congress of the Women's International League for Peace and Freedom in Washington in 1924, where she was able to present to Congress that Ireland had universal suffrage. In 1925, Johnson became the first Labour woman elected to local government, when she was elected to the Rathmines Urban Council.

She died in a home in Howth, Co. Dublin, but not before she created an account of her connection with the suffrage movement, which is housed in the National Library.
