= Michael O'Lehane =

Michael O'Lehane (1873–1920) was an Irish trade unionist.

== Biography ==
Born near Macroom in County Cork, O'Lehane studied at the North Monastery before completing an apprenticeship as a draper. He moved to Limerick in 1898 to work for Cannocks, where he contracted typhoid and narrowly escaped death. Following his recovery, he moved to Dublin to work at Arnotts. While there, he founded the Irish Drapers' Assistants Association (IDAA).

In 1902, O'Lehane travelled around Ireland, recruiting members for the IDAA, with a branch being set up in Galway and over the next few years in other towns and cities. The union focused its campaigns on reducing working hours, creating a half-day holiday per week, and setting up agreements to cover overtime pay. The IDAA attracted particular attention for recruiting women. By 1914, 1,400 of its 4,000 members were women.

The IDAA proved successful, and O'Lehane was elected to other positions in the union movement: President of Dublin Trades Council in 1909, and President of the Irish Trades Union Congress in 1912. He was also elected to the Dublin Corporation in 1907, representing Kilmainham as an independent labour member.

Trade union offices
New office	General Secretary of the Irish Drapers' Assistants Association; 1901–1920	Succeeded by John G. Gilloway
Preceded by W. McLoughlin	President of Dublin Trades Council; 1908–1909	Succeeded by H. Rochford
Preceded by Edward W. Stewart	Treasurer of the Irish Trades Union Congress; 1911	Succeeded by David Robb Campbell
Preceded by David Robb Campbell	President of the Irish Trades Union Congress; 1912	Succeeded by William O'Brien
