= Hugh McManus =

Irish trade unionist

Hugh McManus (died 5 February 1911) was an Irish trade unionist.

Born in County Fermanagh to a Catholic family, McManus trained as a printer and became active in the Typographical Association (TA). He worked for a time in England, but returned to Ireland to marry. In 1894, he was appointed as the union's Irish organiser. Basing himself in Belfast, he led a long campaign to unionise workers in the industry and improve working conditions, and his work established the TA as the leading union in the industry. He was also active on the Belfast Trades Council, where he was often critical of William Walker.

Unlike many Belfast trade unionists, McManus was in favour of the establishment of an Irish association of trade unionists. He attended the founding of the Irish Trades Union Congress (ITUC) in 1894, and was elected as chairman of its first parliamentary committee. In 1899, he defeated John Simmons to become secretary of the ITUC, but the following year, both he and Simmons were defeated by E. L. Richardson. He was chair of the parliamentary committee again in 1901, and remained a member until 1904. In 1903, he attended the conference of the British Labour Representation Committee.

McManus stood down from his TA post in 1910 and died unexpectedly the following year.

Trade union offices
Preceded by New position	Irish Organiser of the Typographical Association; 1894–1910	Succeeded by Thomas Cassidy
Preceded by Organisation founded	Chair of the Parliamentary Committee of the Irish Trades Union Congress; 1894	Succeeded by Peter Tevenan
Preceded by John Simmons	Secretary of the Irish Trades Union Congress; 1899–1900	Succeeded by E. L. Richardson
Preceded by Alexander Bowman	Chair of the Parliamentary Committee of the Irish Trades Union Congress; 1901	Succeeded by Walter Hudson
