= Jack Wills (trade unionist) =

British trade unionist (1877–1933)

Jack Vesey Wills (June 1877 – 14 July 1933) was a British trade unionist.

Born in Poplar, in East London, Wills completed an apprenticeship as a bricklayer and joined the Operative Bricklayers' Society. He also joined the Social Democratic Federation and, in time, became active in the Labour Party. He moved to Bermondsey, and was appointed to its council as an alderman in 1909, also serving on the Board of Guardians and, eventually, as Mayor of Bermondsey. A supporter of workers' education, he was the first treasurer of the Central Labour College, and served on the executive of the National Council of Labour Colleges.

During this period, Wills became interested in syndicalism, and joined the Industrial Syndicalist Education League. He became one of its most prominent speakers, travelling the country to address meetings, in particular during the London building workers' strike of 1914. Later that year, he was a founder of the Building Workers' Industrial Union (BWIU), and was elected as its first general secretary. He was also elected as co-president of the First International Syndicalist Congress, held in London in 1913, but his position as a councillor proved controversial, and he agreed to resign in order that the congress could move to discuss other matters.

Wills remained on the local council, where he became a leader of the left wing of the Labour group, often coming into conflict with Alfred Salter, the Labour group's overall leader. He became known as a champion of the rights of municipal employees. This enabled him to win election as general secretary of the National Union of Corporation Workers in 1921, defeating Manny Shinwell, Chuter Ede, John Allen, Henry Bye and D. G. Stephens. He immediately arranged for the union's head office to move to Bermondsey, and spent much of the decade campaigning against the contracting out of council services, and for the maintenance of existing levels of pay.

Under Wills' leadership, the NUCW was supportive of the UK general strike; although most of its members were not asked to join the strike, those working in relevant industries were called out and given strike benefits. Unlike many other unions, NUCW membership remained steady at around 12,000 workers, and in 1928 it was renamed as the "National Union of Public Employees" (NUPE). Wills succeeded in affiliating the union to the Trades Union Congress and consequently increased its profile. He died in 1933, aged 66, while still in office.

Trade union offices
Preceded by Albin Taylor	General Secretary of the National Union of Public Employees; 1925 – 1933	Succeeded by Bryn Roberts
