= Mai Clifford =

Irish trade unionist and laundress

Mary "Mai" Clifford
- Born: Mary Hollingsworth; 25 September 1913; Phoenix Park, Glasgow, Scotland
- Died: 11 March 1986 (aged 72); Royal City of Dublin Hospital, Baggot Street
- Occupations: trade unionist and laundress

Mary "Mai" Clifford (25 September 1913 – 11 March 1986) was an Irish trade unionist and laundress, and the first woman president of the Dublin Council of Trade Unions.

== Early life and family ==
Mai Clifford was born in Phoenix Park, Glasgow, Scotland on 25 September 1913. She was the eldest child of a blacksmith from County Kerry, Joseph Hollingsworth, and his wife Elizabeth, a Glasgow native. The Clifford family moved to Dublin in 1915, first living in Leinster Square, Rathmines and later Mill Forge, Templeogue. Both of Clifford's parents where supporters of the labour leader James Larkin. Clifford attended St. Joseph's convent, Terenure, going on to work in the Terenure Laundry at age 15.

In 1936 she married a builder's labourer, Daniel Clifford (died 1963). Daniel played professional football in the League of Ireland in the late 1930s. The couple had two sons. They lived with his family in Crumlin, firstly at 1 Windmill Lane, and then 14 Monasterboice Road from the 1940s, where Clifford lived for the rest of her life. She died at the Royal City of Dublin Hospital, Baggot Street on 11 March 1986, and is buried in Templeogue cemetery.

== Career ==
She joined the Irish Women Workers’ Union (IWWU) after two days of starting at the laundry, and was later elected shop steward. As a trade unionist, she prioritised quality of working and social life, and health and safety. She led her fellow workers off the job in 1945 as part of a strike of 1,500 IWWU workers in a campaign for a second week's paid annual holiday for workers in commercial laundries. During the fourteen-week stoppage, Clifford supported her unemployed husband and their two young children on strike pay of 5 shillings per week. The laundresses finally won their claim from the Federated Union of Employers, the first group of workers in Ireland to do so. When the Terenure Laundry closed, Clifford began working in the Shelbourne Hotel, and then St Luke's Hospital, Rathgar from 1957, where she worked as supervisor in the linen room until she retired in 1983.

Clifford was elected to the IWWU executive committee in 1956, serving as the president from 1973 to 1975. She regularly attended the Irish Congress of Trade Unions (ICTU) as the IWWU delegate, serving on ICTU's standing orders committee. She campaigned for promotional prospects and equal pay for women throughout the 1960s and 1970s. In 1970 she was appointed to the women's advisory committee of ICTU, opposing at preferential treatment of professional women over industrial workers. During her presidential address at the IWWU's 1973 annual convention, she advocated for women to embrace flexibility in the workplace and to accept all opportunities presented to them. As a union delegate she travelled across Europe investigating the conditions of working women in other countries. She met Mikhail Gorbachev, then USSR minister for agriculture, in Moscow in 1976. This meeting provoked controversy when she ran unsuccessfully in the 1979 local government elections for the Labour Party in the Crumlin–Terenure ward. During her campaign she was denounced by a local priest as a communist.

From 1971 she was a member of the executive of the Dublin Council of Trade Unions, serving as the council's president from 1978 to 1981, the first woman to serve in that office. In this role she campaigned in for the trade unions’ income tax reform in 1979 and 1980, a campaign which protested the high level of taxation of PAYE worker in comparison to the self-employed. She was prominent in the media during the campaign, giving platform speeches and leading protest marches. The campaign culminated in a march of 300,000 workers in Dublin and one million across the country on 22 January 1980, the largest labour demonstration in the history of the Irish state. It was Clifford who delivered a letter to Government Buildings demanding that the "intolerable burden on the working class" be relieved. In 1983 she was named IWWU honorary treasurer, and after the merging of the IWWU with the Federated Workers’ Union of Ireland in 1984, she was appointed an executive member and trustee.
