= Seán Campbell (trade unionist) =

Irish politician and trade unionist (1889–1950)

Senator
- In office 8 September 1943 – 21 April 1948
- Constituency: Nominated by the Taoiseach
- In office 21 April 1948 – 27 February 1950
- In office 7 September 1938 – 8 September 1943
- Constituency: Labour Panel

Personal details
- Born: John Patrick Campbell; 4 March 1889 Dublin, Ireland
- Died: 27 February 1950 (aged 60) Dublin, Ireland
- Party: Labour Party
- Spouse: Ellen Donnelly
- Education: Synge Street CBS

Seán Patrick Campbell (4 March 1889 – 27 February 1950) was an Irish Labour Party politician and trade union official. He was a member of the Dublin Typographical Provident Society and served as the president of the Irish Trades Union Congress in 1933.

He was born on 4 March 1889 in Dublin, the son of John Campbell, a labourer, and Isabella Campbell (née Darragh). He was educated at Synge Street CBS, and then became an apprentice printer.

In June 1927, he stood unsuccessfully as a Labour Party candidate in the Dublin South constituency, receiving 1,825 (3.4%) first preference votes. He was elected to Seanad Éireann in 1938 on the Labour Panel. In 1943 and 1944, he was nominated by the Taoiseach to the Seanad. At the 1948 Seanad election, he was again elected by the Labour Panel.

He was married to Ellen Donnelly; they had no children. He died in office on 27 February 1950.

Political offices
Preceded by Louie Bennett	President of the Irish Trades Union Congress; 1933	Succeeded by Michael Duffy
Preceded by Luke Duffy	Treasurer of the Irish Trades Union Congress; 1934–1944	Succeeded by J. T. O'Farrell
