= Luke Duffy =

Irish trade unionist and politician (1890–1961)

Senator
- In office 18 August 1944 – 22 June 1949
- Constituency: Industrial and Commercial Panel

Personal details
- Born: 26 March 1890 County Sligo, Ireland
- Died: 3 August 1961 (aged 71) Dublin, Ireland
- Party: Labour Party
- Spouse: Mary O'Donovan (m. 1920)
- Children: 4

Luke Joseph Duffy (26 March 1890 – 3 August 1961) was an Irish trade unionist and Labour Party politician, who served for five years as a senator.

Born in Gurteen, County Sligo in 1890, Duffy's first job was as a draper's apprentice in Moon's of Galway. By 1910, he was an active member of the local branch of the Irish Drapers' Assistants Association (IDAA), and he was elected branch secretary in 1911. In the following years, he was vice-president and trustee of the Trades Council, secretary of the Volunteers and of the Galway City Gaelic Athletic Association, and active in the Irish National Foresters. In 1914, he chaired the IDAA's annual conference in Dublin. Sacked from Moon's for union activity in 1916, he was appointed Munster organiser of the IDAA. A few years later, he was elected as general secretary of the renamed Irish Distributive and Administrative Trade Union. In 1933, he became general secretary of the Labour Party.

In 1944, he was elected by the Industrial and Commercial Panel as a member of the 5th Seanad. He was re-elected in 1948 to the 6th Seanad, but resigned when appointed to the board of the newly established Industrial Development Authority (IDA), by Daniel Morrissey, Minister for Industry and Commerce. This appointment was for a term of five years through 25 May 1954. He resigned from the Seanad on 22 June 1949 to accept this appointment and also relinquished his position as General Secretary of the Labour Party.

In his appointment to the IDA, Duffy worked at developing strategies that would ultimately lead to attracting direct foreign investment into Ireland. The IDA was placed on statutory footing in 1950. Duffy spent the rest of his career in advancing the aims and objectives of the IDA. He retired from the IDA in 1960.

In 1920, he married Mary O'Donovan from Cork at St. Peter and Paul’s church. They had two sons and two daughters. Duffy died on 3 August 1961, in Dún Laoghaire, at the age of 71.

== Sources ==
- John Cunningham, Labour in the West of Ireland: working life and struggle, 1890–1914, Athol Books (Belfast) 1995.

Trade union offices
Preceded by John G. Gilloway	General Secretary of the Irish Distributive and Administrative Trade Union; 1922–1933	Succeeded by Michael Drumgoole
Preceded by Cathal O'Shannon	President of the Irish Trades Union Congress; 1923–1924	Succeeded by William O'Brien
Preceded by William McMullen	President of the Irish Trades Union Congress; 1929	Succeeded by Thomas J. O'Connell
Preceded by Denis Cullen	Treasurer of the Irish Trades Union Congress; 1931–1933	Succeeded by Seán Campbell
