= Thomas J. O'Connell =

Irish politician (1882–1969)

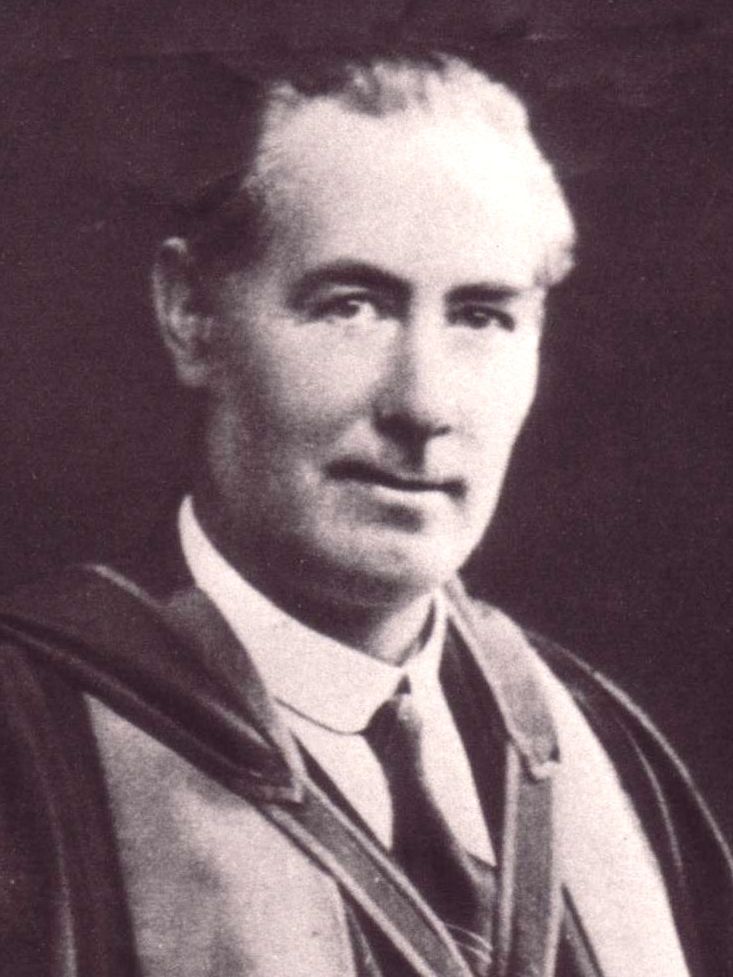
- O'Connell in 1933

Leader of the Labour Party
- In office 11 August 1927 – 14 July 1932
- Preceded by: Thomas Johnson
- Succeeded by: William Norton

Senator
- In office 22 July 1954 – 22 May 1957
- In office 21 April 1948 – 14 August 1951
- In office 22 January 1941 – 18 August 1944
- Constituency: Cultural and Educational Panel

Teachta Dála
- In office June 1927 – February 1932
- Constituency: Mayo South
- In office June 1922 – June 1927
- Constituency: Galway

Personal details
- Born: 21 November 1882 Knock, County Mayo, Ireland
- Died: 22 June 1969 (aged 86) Galway, Ireland
- Party: Labour Party
- Spouse: Kathleen O'Connor
- Children: 5
- Education: St Patrick's College, Dublin

Thomas Joseph O'Connell (21 November 1882 – 22 June 1969) was an Irish Labour Party politician who served as Leader of the Labour Party from 1927 to 1932. He served as a Teachta Dála (TD) from 1922 to 1932. He was a Senator for the Cultural and Educational Panel from 1938 to 1944, 1948 to 1951 and 1954 to 1957.

== Background ==
Thomas Joseph O'Connell was born near Knock, County Mayo, the second child of Maria Biesty and Thomas Connell. As part of the Gaelic revival, his family adopted the prefix "O" to their surname in the early 20th Century. His father was a farmer who was politically active and a community leader. Family lore held that his father had been a Fenian who had taken part in the Fenian Rising of 1867. He was also an activist in the Land League and a member of the United Irish League (UIL). One of Thomas's aunts, Mary O'Connell, had been one of the first witnesses of the Marian Apparition at Knock in 1879. Perhaps unsurprisingly, this may have influenced the fact that Thomas was a devout Catholic throughout his life.

He qualified as a teacher in St Patrick's training college, Drumcondra, Dublin. He taught at Horseleap, County Westmeath (1902–1905), then served as principal teacher at Streamstown, County Westmeath (1905–1916). In 1916 he became general secretary of the Irish National Teachers' Organisation (INTO), which post he would occupy until retirement in 1948.

In 1906 married Kathleen O'Connor, a fellow national school teacher. They had four children in the first five years of their marriage. A fifth child died shortly after birth. When Kathleen arranged for a substitute teacher to cover for her while she recovered from the loss of their child, she received a financial penalty from her employers for doing so. O'Connell was furious, and as a leading member of the INTO set upon a vigorous campaign to have the rule that prompted the fine removed. The campaign threw O'Connell into the national spotlight. O'Connell was able to use the old UIL connections of his father to contact John Dillon and other Irish MPs to raise the issue in the House of Commons, and eventually, the rule was dropped. The campaign was hailed as a great victory for the INTO and women teachers in Ireland.

== Political career ==
At the 1922 general election, he was elected as Teachta Dála (TD) for Galway, and he was re-elected at the 1923 general election. O'Connell was able to utilise a strong grassroots organisation in the constituency as well as the vote of teachers to secure victory.

At the June 1927 election he stood instead in the new five-seat Mayo South constituency, where he topped the poll, and he was re-elected at the September 1927 election. In Mayo, O'Connell relied on the support of Teachers, migrant workers on Achill Island who were reckoned to better understand what a labour party stood for than other parts of Ireland, and the support of the area around his family's homeland of South Mayo: Bekan, Knock and Ballyhaunis.

A critical blunder for O'Connell and the Labour Party occurred during the 5th Dáil. In August 1927, Fianna Fáil entered the Dáil and gave its support to the Labour Party's motion of no confidence in the Cumann na nGaedheal government. The plan was to replace it with a Labour–National League Party coalition supported by Fianna Fáil, with Labour leader Thomas Johnson as President of the Executive Council. O'Connell was envisioned to be the new Minister for Education. The Cumann na nGaedheal government still had the backing of the Farmers' Party and most of the Independent TDs. The National League lost one TD prior to the vote (Vincent Rice, who joined Cumann na nGaedheal later that year) and another failed to attend (John Jinks, who left the party shortly after the vote). O'Connell was also absent, as he was attending a conference on behalf of the INTO in Canada. The vote of no-confidence was a tie, and the Ceann Comhairle used his casting vote in favour of the government. A rare chance in Irish history to place a labour led coalition in government was missed.

=== Labour Party leader ===
The 5th Dáil collapsed after just four months in office, resulting in the September 1927 Irish general election. The election did not go well for Labour, and they lost all the seats they had gained in the June 1927 Irish general election plus an additional one. One of the casualties was Johnson. The Labour Party's statutes required the leader to be a sitting TD. As such, O'Connell was unanimously elected the new leader of the party, a position he would hold until 1932.

O'Connell inherited from Johnson a not particularly disciplined Labour Party. Johnson himself commented privately that between 13 TDs and 5 senators, no two of them could ever agree on the fundamental values of the party. Labour TDs not voting in line with the rest of the party was more common than with the other parties. In October 1931, the Cumann na Gaedhael government rushed to pass the Public Safety Act 1931. The act would allow the government to establish a military tribunal for hearing political cases as well as the right to suspend constitutional guarantees at their discretion. It came in response to rising Irish Republican Army activity across the country but Labour and its members feared greatly it would trample civil liberties. An internal labour vote was held on the bill and by a margin of 3 to 1 they voted to oppose the bill. O'Connell denounced the bill in the Dáil, declaring it made a farce of the institution and that Cumann na Gaedhael might as well establish a military dictatorship in Ireland while they were at it. However, two Labour TDs, deputy leader Daniel Morrissey and Richard Anthony, broke ranks and voted with the government. O'Connell expelled the two TDs from the party for their actions.

Another issue O'Connell dealt with during his tenure was 1930 the Letitia Dunbar-Harrison affair in 1930, known as the Mayo Librarian Affair. Dunbar-Harrison had applied to become county librarian in Mayo, a position that was vacant at the time. Ultimately the County Council refused to offer the position, on the stated reason she could not speak Irish but, as many felt, with the subtext being she was denied on account of being a Protestant. The issue ballooned and escalated into a national political issue with Cumann na Gaedhael supporting her appointment but the Catholic Bishops and many of the opposition parties opposing it. Perhaps surprisingly, the normally avowed non-sectarian Labour was amongst those opposing the appointment, with O'Connell working with the likes of the Archbishop of Tuam to advocate against it.

From 1929 to 1930 he was president of the Irish Labour Party and the Irish Trades Union Congress. In 1935 he co-founded the Educational Building Society with Alexander McCabe.

== Later political life ==
He lost his seat at the 1932 election, did not contest the 1933 general election, and in 1941 he was elected to the 3rd Seanad. In 1943, he was elected to the 4th Seanad by the Cultural and Educational Panel, but did not contest the 1944 Seanad election. The Cultural and Educational Panel re-elected him in 1948 to the 6th Seanad and in 1954 to the 8th Seanad.

== Sources ==
- Thomas Johnson, 1872–1963, John Anthony Gaughan, Kingdom Books, Dublin, 1980, ISBN 0-9506015-3-5

Party political offices
Preceded by Thomas Johnson	Leader of the Labour Party; 1927–1932	Succeeded by William Norton
Trade union offices
Preceded by Eamonn Mansfield	General Secretary of the Irish National Teachers' Organisation; 1916–1948	Succeeded by D. J. Kelleher
Preceded by Luke Duffy	President of the Irish Trades Union Congress; 1930	Succeeded by Denis Cullen

Dáil	Election	Deputy (Party)	Deputy (Party)	Deputy (Party)	Deputy (Party)	Deputy (Party)	Deputy (Party)	Deputy (Party)	Deputy (Party)	Deputy (Party)
2nd	1921	Liam Mellows (SF)	Bryan Cusack (SF)	Frank Fahy (SF)	Joseph Whelehan (SF)	Pádraic Ó Máille (SF)	George Nicolls (SF)	Patrick Hogan (SF)	7 seats 1921–1923	
3rd	1922	Thomas O'Connell (Lab)	Bryan Cusack (AT-SF)	Frank Fahy (AT-SF)	Joseph Whelehan (PT-SF)	Pádraic Ó Máille (PT-SF)	George Nicolls (PT-SF)	Patrick Hogan (PT-SF)	7 seats 1921–1923	
4th	1923	Thomas O'Connell (Lab)	Barney Mellows (Rep)	Frank Fahy (Rep)	Louis O'Dea (Rep)	Pádraic Ó Máille (CnaG)	George Nicolls (CnaG)	Patrick Hogan (CnaG)	Seán Broderick (CnaG)	James Cosgrave (Ind.)
5th	1927 (Jun)	Gilbert Lynch (Lab)	Thomas Powell (FF)	Frank Fahy (Note: Frank Fahy served as Ceann Comhairle from 9 March 1932.) (FF)	Seán Tubridy (FF)	Mark Killilea Snr (FF)	Martin McDonogh (CnaG)	Patrick Hogan (CnaG)	Seán Broderick (CnaG)	William Duffy (NL)
6th	1927 (Sep)	Stephen Jordan (FF)	Thomas Powell (FF)	Frank Fahy (FF)	Seán Tubridy (FF)	Mark Killilea Snr (FF)	Martin McDonogh (CnaG)	Patrick Hogan (CnaG)	Seán Broderick (CnaG)	Joseph Mongan (CnaG)
7th	1932	Stephen Jordan (FF)	Thomas Powell (FF)	Frank Fahy (FF)	Patrick Beegan (FF)	Gerald Bartley (FF)	Fred McDonogh (CnaG)	Patrick Hogan (CnaG)	Seán Broderick (CnaG)	Joseph Mongan (CnaG)
8th	1933	Stephen Jordan (FF)	Mark Killilea Snr (FF)	Frank Fahy (FF)	Patrick Beegan (FF)	Gerald Bartley (FF)	Séamus Keely (FF)	Patrick Hogan (CnaG)	Seán Broderick (CnaG)	Martin McDonogh (CnaG)
8th	1935 by-election	Stephen Jordan (FF)	Mark Killilea Snr (FF)	Frank Fahy (FF)	Patrick Beegan (FF)	Gerald Bartley (FF)	Séamus Keely (FF)	Patrick Hogan (CnaG)	Seán Broderick (CnaG)	Eamon Corbett (FF)
8th	1936 by-election	Stephen Jordan (FF)	Mark Killilea Snr (FF)	Frank Fahy (FF)	Patrick Beegan (FF)	Gerald Bartley (FF)	Séamus Keely (FF)	Martin Neilan (FF)	Seán Broderick (CnaG)	Eamon Corbett (FF)
9th	1937	Constituency abolished. See Galway East and Galway West								

Dáil	Election	Deputy (Party)	Deputy (Party)	Deputy (Party)	Deputy (Party)	Deputy (Party)
4th	1923	Tom Maguire (Rep)	Michael Kilroy (Rep)	William Sears (CnaG)	Joseph MacBride (CnaG)	Martin Nally (CnaG)
5th	1927 (Jun)	Thomas J. O'Connell (Lab)	Michael Kilroy (FF)	Eugene Mullen (FF)	James FitzGerald-Kenney (CnaG)	Martin Nally (CnaG)
6th	1927 (Sep)	Thomas J. O'Connell (Lab)	Michael Kilroy (FF)	Richard Walsh (FF)	James FitzGerald-Kenney (CnaG)	Martin Nally (CnaG)
7th	1932	Edward Moane (FF)	Michael Kilroy (FF)	Richard Walsh (FF)	James FitzGerald-Kenney (CnaG)	Martin Nally (CnaG)
8th	1933	Edward Moane (FF)	Michael Kilroy (FF)	Richard Walsh (FF)	James FitzGerald-Kenney (CnaG)	Martin Nally (CnaG)
9th	1937	Edward Moane (FF)	Micheál Clery (FF)	Richard Walsh (FF)	James FitzGerald-Kenney (FG)	Martin Nally (FG)
10th	1938	Mícheál Ó Móráin (FF)	Micheál Clery (FF)	Richard Walsh (FF)	James FitzGerald-Kenney (FG)	Martin Nally (FG)
11th	1943	Mícheál Ó Móráin (FF)	Micheál Clery (FF)	Joseph Blowick (CnaT)	James FitzGerald-Kenney (FG)	Dominick Cafferky (CnaT)
12th	1944	Mícheál Ó Móráin (FF)	Micheál Clery (FF)	Joseph Blowick (CnaT)	Richard Walsh (FF)	Dominick Cafferky (CnaT)
12th	1945 by-election	Mícheál Ó Móráin (FF)	Bernard Commons (CnaT)	Joseph Blowick (CnaT)	Richard Walsh (FF)	Dominick Cafferky (CnaT)
13th	1948	Mícheál Ó Móráin (FF)	Bernard Commons (CnaT)	Joseph Blowick (CnaT)	Richard Walsh (FF)	4 seats 1948–1969
14th	1951	Mícheál Ó Móráin (FF)	Seán Flanagan (FF)	Joseph Blowick (CnaT)	Dominick Cafferky (CnaT)	4 seats 1948–1969
15th	1954	Mícheál Ó Móráin (FF)	Seán Flanagan (FF)	Joseph Blowick (CnaT)	Henry Kenny (FG)	4 seats 1948–1969
16th	1957	Mícheál Ó Móráin (FF)	Seán Flanagan (FF)	Joseph Blowick (CnaT)	Henry Kenny (FG)	4 seats 1948–1969
17th	1961	Mícheál Ó Móráin (FF)	Seán Flanagan (FF)	Joseph Blowick (CnaT)	Henry Kenny (FG)	4 seats 1948–1969
18th	1965	Mícheál Ó Móráin (FF)	Seán Flanagan (FF)	Michael Lyons (FG)	Henry Kenny (FG)	4 seats 1948–1969
19th	1969	Constituency abolished. See Mayo East and Mayo West				
