= Michael Drumgoole =

Irish trade unionist (1882–1960)

- Born: 1882; Croom, County Limerick, Ireland
- Died: May 24, 1960 (aged 77–78)
- Occupation: Trade unionist

Michael Drumgoole (1882 – 24 May 1960) was an Irish trade unionist.

Born in Croom, County Limerick, Drumgoole moved to New York in 1899, where he worked at Lord & Taylor and lived with his uncle. In 1902, he returned to Ireland, where he joined the Irish Drapers' Assistants' Association (IDAA) in 1905. The IDAA was renamed the Irish Union of Distributive Workers and Clerks (IUDWC), and Drumgoole was elected as its General Treasurer in 1920. Alongside this, he was secretary of the union's Dublin and Drapery Buyers branches, until he was elected as General Secretary in 1934.

Drumgoole was also active in the Irish Trades Union Congress (ITUC), serving on its general council from 1931, and as its President in 1936/37. However, in 1945, he led the IUDWC out of the ITUC as a founder constituent of the Congress of Irish Unions, and served as the Chairman of Congress for six years.

Drumgoole was an unsuccessful Labour Party candidate for Seanad Éireann at both the 1948 and 1951 elections. He retired in 1954, and died six years later.

Trade union offices
Preceded by Luke Duffy	General Secretary of the Irish Union of Distributive Workers and Clerks; 1934–1954	Succeeded by Billy Fitzpatrick
Preceded by P. J. Cairns	President of the Irish Trades Union Congress; 1936–1937	Succeeded by Helena Molony
