= J. T. O'Farrell =

Irish politician (1887–1971)

Senator
- In office 21 April 1948 – 31 May 1950
- Constituency: Labour Panel

Senator
- In office 11 December 1922 – 29 May 1936

Personal details
- Born: 1887 County Roscommon, Ireland
- Died: 2 January 1971 (aged 83–84)
- Party: Labour Party
- Education: College of Commerce, Rathmines

John Thomas O'Farrell (1887 – 2 January 1971) was an Irish Labour Party politician and trade union official. He was born in Churchborough, County Roscommon in 1887, and was educated at the College of Commerce, Rathmines. He was a member of the Railway Clerks' Association and served as the president of the Irish Trades Union Congress in 1927.

He was an unsuccessful Labour Party candidate for the Dublin North-West constituency at the 1922 general election. He was elected to the new Irish Free State Seanad in 1922 for 3 years. He was re-elected for a 12-year term at the 1925 Seanad election and served until the Free State Seanad was abolished in 1936. He also stood unsuccessfully for the Dublin County constituency at the 1943 general election. He was elected to the 6th Seanad Éireann in 1948 by the Labour Panel. He resigned from the Seanad on 31 May 1950.

Trade union offices
Preceded by Denis Cullen	President of the Irish Trades Union Congress; 1927	Succeeded by William McMullen
Preceded by Seán Campbell	Treasurer of the Irish Trade Union Congress; 1945–1949	Succeeded by John Swift
