= Thomas Farren =

Irish politician and trade unionist (1879–1955)

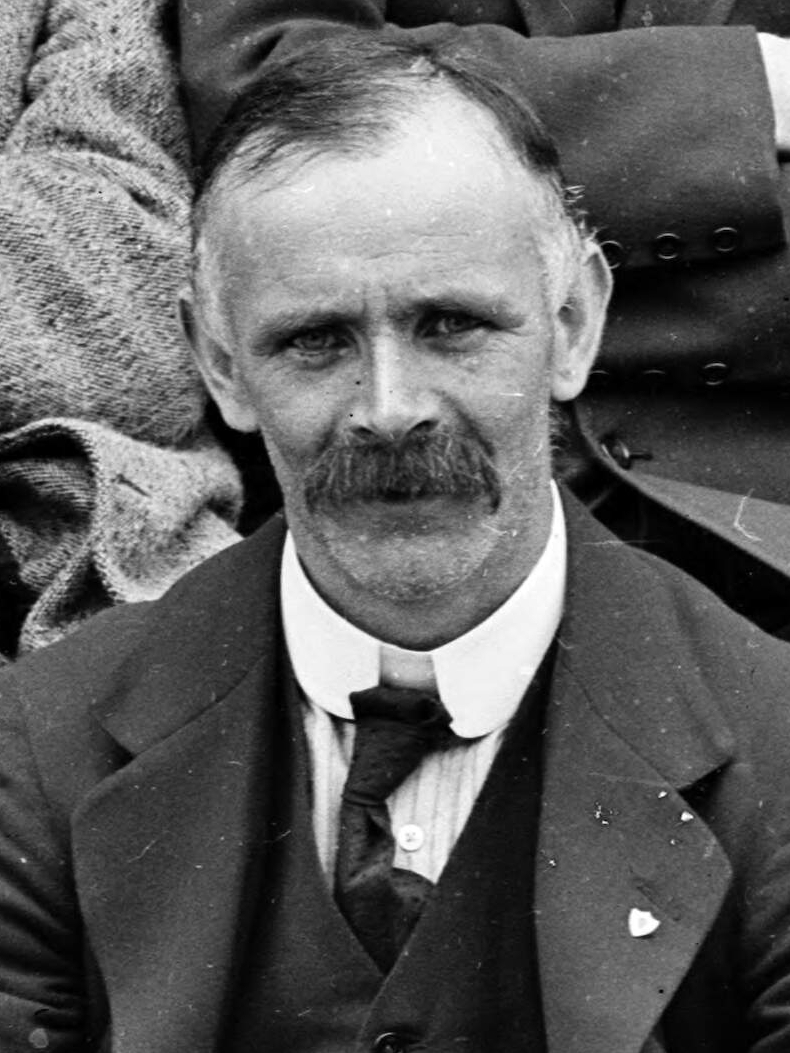
- Farren in 1918

Senator
- In office 11 December 1922 – 29 May 1936

Personal details
- Born: 11 December 1879 Dublin, Ireland
- Died: 26 March 1955 (aged 75) Dublin, Ireland
- Party: Labour Party
- Spouse: Nellie Farren

Military service
- Branch/service: Irish Citizen Army
- Battles/wars: Easter Rising

Thomas Farren (11 December 1879 – 26 March 1955) was an Irish Labour Party politician and trade union official.

Farren stood unsuccessfully for a UK Parliament by-election for Dublin College Green in 1915.

In 1916 he participated in the Easter Rising as part of the Irish Citizen Army.

Farren was a member of the Stonecutters' Union of Ireland and served as the president of the Irish Trades Union Congress in 1920.

Farren was elected to the new Irish Free State Seanad in 1922 for 9 years. He was re-elected in 1931 for another 9-year term and served until the Free State Seanad was abolished in 1936.

Trade union offices
Preceded by William O'Brien	President of the Dublin Council of Trade Unions; 1915	Succeeded by John Lawlor
Preceded by William O'Brien	Secretary of the Dublin Council of Trade Unions; 1919	Succeeded by P. T. Daly
Preceded by Thomas Cassidy	President of the Irish Trades Union Congress; 1920	Succeeded by Thomas Foran
