= John Swift (trade unionist) =

Irish trade union leader

6th President of the International Union of Food, Agricultural, Hotel, Restaurant, Catering, Tobacco and Allied Workers' Associations (IUF)
- In office 1964–1967
- Preceded by: Hans Nätscher
- Succeeded by: Henri Ceuppens

General Secretary of the Irish Bakers, Confectioners and Allied Workers Amalgamated Union
- In office 1942–1967

Personal details
- Born: 1896
- Died: 1990 (aged 93–94)
- Occupation: Baker; trade unionist

John Swift (1896–1990) was an Irish trade union leader and secularist.

Born in Dundalk, Swift was educated at a Christian Brothers School. His father ran a co-operative bakery but this closed and the family endured poverty. In 1914, Swift began an apprenticeship at a bakery in Dublin, and spent much of his spare time attending meetings where Jim Larkin was speaking. He briefly joined the Irish Volunteers, but took time out following an accident, and decided not to rejoin due to Larkin's opposition to the organisation.

Swift became active in the Irish National Federal Union of Bakers, attempting to recruit his fellow workers. As a result, he was sacked from his job and, due to the lack of available work in Ireland, he was forced to move to England and work in a munitions factory. There, he led a strike, and as a result was court-marshalled and confined at Wandsworth Prison. He was offered the opportunity to leave if he joined the British Army but, when he refused, was given solitary confinement. He passed the time whistling arias by Verdi; a warder mistook these for Irish rebel songs and placed him on punishment rations of bread and water for a week.

Swift agreed to join the Army as a non-combatant cook, but once he was informed that he would still be required to take part in weapons drills, he refused to take part, and was moved to the military prison in Aldershot. Finally, he accepted a role as a cook with the King's Own Royal Lancasters in March 1918. Before the end of the month, he had been wounded, and was hospitalised, only returning shortly before the Armistice.

Swift was demobbed in 1919 and returned to Dublin, but was unable to find regular work, and so emigrated to Paris. He was back in Dublin in 1925, where he again became involved in union activism. He launched a union orchestra and choir, then a bakery school. The school was a great success, and was taken over by the Dublin Vocational Committee, although Swift remained its chair until his retirement.

Swift was the driving force in the creation at the end of 1933 of the Secular Society of Ireland. The hostile Irish Press noted that admission to the society's fortnightly meeting in Dublin was "by invitation only" and that its membership form stated:

Convinced that clerical domination in the community is harmful to advance, the Secular society of Ireland seeks to establish in this country complete freedom of thought, speech and publication, liberty for mind, in the widest toleration compatible with orderly progress and rational conduct.

It aimed to terminate, among other things, ”the clerically-dictated ban on divorce”, “the Censorship of Publications Act” and “the system of clerical management, and consequent sectarian teaching, in schools.” The paper also quoted a chairman of a society meeting to the effect that the society “did not advocate either Divorce or Birth Control but would press for facilities in both matters for people who desired them, and would endeavour to have the law here amended accordingly.”

This was at a time of heightened clerical militancy: in March, crowds, fired by pastoral warnings against the spread of left-wing ideas, had attacked the RWG/CPI headquarters in Connolly House, the Workers’ College in Eccles Street and the Workers Union of Ireland office in Marlborough Street. As soon the meeting place of the Secular Society (from which it distributed the British journal The Freethinker) was exposed, it had to shift to private houses out of town.

In 1936, as the Irish Christian Front mobilised in support of General Franco, members, who included the socialist Jack White, the novelist Mary Manning, and the playwright Denis Johnston, wound up the Secular Society and sent the proceeds to the Spanish Government. Sewift became the founding Vice-Chairman of the Spanish Aid Committee, raising support for the Irish "Connolly" section if the International Brigade which volunteered for the Republic in the Spanish Civil War.

That same year, Swift was appointed as national organiser of the union, by then known as the "Irish Bakers, Confectioners and Allied Workers Amalgamated Union", and in 1942, he was elected as its General Secretary. As general secretary, Swift oversaw the purchase and fitting out of a new headquarters for the union, on Harcourt Street.

Swift was active on the Dublin Trades Council, succeeding Larkin as president in 1945, and becoming editor of Workers' Action, its newspaper. He served as president of the Irish Trades Union Congress in 1946, using his presidency to promote workers' education; this led to the founding of The People's College. He was also prominent in the International Union of Food and Allied Workers' Association, working with Hermann Leuenberger to maintain unofficial contacts with trade unionists across Europe during World War II, and to assist refugees, and he served as president of the international from 1964.

Swift was a member of the Labour Party from 1927, always associated with its left-wing. He wrote the party's "Workers' Democracy" policy in the 1960s. In 1973, he surprised many by supporting Ireland joining the European Economic Community. Alongside Nora Harkin, and Bobbie and Frank Edwards, Swift was a founding member of the Ireland-USSR Society.

Swift retired from his trade union posts in 1967 and wrote a history of the Irish Bakers. In retirement, he served as president of the Irish Labour History Society, and also as president of the Ireland-USSR Society.

Trade union offices
Preceded by Denis Cullen	General Secretary of the Irish Bakers, Confectioners and Allied Workers Amalgamated Union; 1942–1967	Succeeded by James Young
Preceded by Gilbert Lynch	President of the Irish Trades Union Congress; 1947	Succeeded by Louie Bennett
Preceded by J. T. O'Farrell	Treasurer of the Irish Trades Union Congress; 1949–1958	Succeeded by Dominick Murphy
Preceded by Hans Nätscher	President of the International Union of Food and Allied Workers' Associations; 1964–1967	Succeeded by Henri Ceuppens
