= Denis Cullen =

Irish trade unionist and politician (1878–1971)

Teachta Dála
- In office June 1927 – September 1927
- Constituency: Dublin North

Personal details
- Born: 19 August 1886 Donabate, County Dublin, Ireland
- Died: 26 November 1971 (aged 85) Dublin, Ireland
- Party: Labour Party
- Spouse: Mary Cullen
- Children: 1

Denis Cullen (19 August 1886 – 26 November 1971) was an Irish Labour Party politician and trade union official.

A baker by trade, during the 1910s he emerged as a leading figure in the Dublin branch of the Irish Bakers' National Amalgamated Union. At the 1918 national convention – at which the union's name was changed to the Irish Bakers, Confectioners, and Allied Workers Amalgamated Union – Cullen was elected national general secretary, commencing a twenty-five-year tenure (1918–1943), during which he was chief negotiator for both the national union and Dublin branch. He was also prominent in the leadership of the Irish Trades Union Congress (ITUC), serving almost continually on the national executive (1920–1939, 1940–1943), as treasurer (1929–1930), and for two terms as president (1925–1926, 1930–1931).

In 1925 the Labour Party identified high taxation as a government weakness and decided to contest the Dublin North and Dublin South by-elections. Cullen, as general secretary of the Irish Bakers, Confectioners and Allied Workers Amalgamated Union, was candidate in Dublin North with Thomas Lawlor, Irish Municipal Employees Union, in Dublin South. Neither of them were elected.

He was elected to Dáil Éireann as a Labour Party Teachta Dála (TD) for the Dublin North constituency at the June 1927 general election. He lost his seat at the September 1927 general election having only served 3 months as a TD.

Trade union offices
Preceded by Robert Wilson	General Secretary of the Irish Bakers, Confectioners and Allied Workers Amalgamated Union; 1920s–1942	Succeeded by John Swift
Preceded by William O'Brien	President of the Irish Trades Union Congress; 1926	Succeeded by J. T. O'Farrell
Preceded by William O'Brien	Treasurer of the Irish Trade Union Congress; 1930	Succeeded by Luke Duffy
Preceded by Thomas J. O'Connell	President of the Irish Trade Union Congress; 1931	Succeeded by Louie Bennett

Dáil	Election	Deputy (Party)	Deputy (Party)	Deputy (Party)	Deputy (Party)	Deputy (Party)	Deputy (Party)	Deputy (Party)	Deputy (Party)
4th	1923	Alfie Byrne (Ind.)	Francis Cahill (CnaG)	Margaret Collins-O'Driscoll (CnaG)	Seán McGarry (CnaG)	William Hewat (BP)	Richard Mulcahy (CnaG)	Seán T. O'Kelly (Rep)	Ernie O'Malley (Rep)
4th	1925 by-election	Alfie Byrne (Ind.)	Patrick Leonard (CnaG)	Margaret Collins-O'Driscoll (CnaG)	Oscar Traynor (Rep)	William Hewat (BP)	Richard Mulcahy (CnaG)	Seán T. O'Kelly (Rep)	Ernie O'Malley (Rep)
5th	1927 (Jun)	Alfie Byrne (Ind.)	John Byrne (CnaG)	Margaret Collins-O'Driscoll (CnaG)	Oscar Traynor (SF)	Denis Cullen (Lab)	Richard Mulcahy (CnaG)	Seán T. O'Kelly (FF)	Kathleen Clarke (FF)
6th	1927 (Sep)	Alfie Byrne (Ind.)	John Byrne (CnaG)	Margaret Collins-O'Driscoll (CnaG)	Patrick Leonard (CnaG)	James Larkin (IWL)	Richard Mulcahy (CnaG)	Seán T. O'Kelly (FF)	Eamonn Cooney (FF)
6th	1928 by-election	Alfie Byrne (Ind.)	John Byrne (CnaG)	Margaret Collins-O'Driscoll (CnaG)	Patrick Leonard (CnaG)	Vincent Rice (CnaG)	Richard Mulcahy (CnaG)	Seán T. O'Kelly (FF)	Eamonn Cooney (FF)
6th	1929 by-election	Thomas F. O'Higgins (CnaG)	John Byrne (CnaG)	Margaret Collins-O'Driscoll (CnaG)	Patrick Leonard (CnaG)	Vincent Rice (CnaG)	Richard Mulcahy (CnaG)	Seán T. O'Kelly (FF)	Eamonn Cooney (FF)
7th	1932	Alfie Byrne (Ind.)	John Byrne (CnaG)	Margaret Collins-O'Driscoll (CnaG)	Oscar Traynor (FF)	Cormac Breathnach (FF)	Richard Mulcahy (CnaG)	Seán T. O'Kelly (FF)	Eamonn Cooney (FF)
8th	1933	Alfie Byrne (Ind.)	Patrick Belton (CnaG)	Vincent Rice (CnaG)	Oscar Traynor (FF)	Cormac Breathnach (FF)	Richard Mulcahy (CnaG)	Seán T. O'Kelly (FF)	Eamonn Cooney (FF)
9th	1937	Constituency abolished. See Dublin North-East and Dublin North-West							

Dáil	Election	Deputy (Party)	Deputy (Party)	Deputy (Party)	Deputy (Party)
22nd	1981	Ray Burke (FF)	John Boland (FG)	Nora Owen (FG)	3 seats 1981–1992
23rd	1982 (Feb)	Ray Burke (FF)	John Boland (FG)	Nora Owen (FG)	3 seats 1981–1992
24th	1982 (Nov)	Ray Burke (FF)	John Boland (FG)	Nora Owen (FG)	3 seats 1981–1992
25th	1987	Ray Burke (FF)	John Boland (FG)	G. V. Wright (FF)	3 seats 1981–1992
26th	1989	Ray Burke (FF)	Nora Owen (FG)	Seán Ryan (Lab)	3 seats 1981–1992
27th	1992	Ray Burke (FF)	Nora Owen (FG)	Seán Ryan (Lab)	Trevor Sargent (GP)
28th	1997	Ray Burke (FF)	Nora Owen (FG)	G. V. Wright (FF)	Trevor Sargent (GP)
28th	1998 by-election	Seán Ryan (Lab)	Nora Owen (FG)	G. V. Wright (FF)	Trevor Sargent (GP)
29th	2002	Seán Ryan (Lab)	Jim Glennon (FF)	G. V. Wright (FF)	Trevor Sargent (GP)
30th	2007	James Reilly (FG)	Michael Kennedy (FF)	Darragh O'Brien (FF)	Trevor Sargent (GP)
31st	2011	James Reilly (FG)	Alan Farrell (FG)	Brendan Ryan (Lab)	Clare Daly (SP)
32nd	2016	Constituency abolished. See Dublin Fingal			
