= James McCarron =

Irish trade unionist

Alderman James McCarron (1851 – 10 October 1918) was an Irish trade unionist.

McCarron came to prominence as a leading figure in the Amalgamated Society of Tailors and Tailoresses, based in Derry. In the early 1890s, he was the secretary of the local branch, and was imprisoned in the aftermath of a strike.

Soon becoming the most prominent member of his union in Ireland, he was elected to the Parliamentary Committee of the Irish Trades Union Congress every year from 1894 until 1909, and served as President on three occasions, in 1899, 1907 and 1910.

In the mid-1890s, McCarron, was a proponent of land nationalisation, but he later joined the Labour Representation Committee, then later the new Irish Labour Party. He was elected to Derry City Council, becoming the group's leader, later an alderman, and Chairman of the Public Health Committee.

McCarron was an Irish nationalist, but was a staunch defender of the role of British-based trade unions in Ireland. He was appointed as one of two representatives of the labour movement on the Irish Convention of 1917 and early 1918, which unsuccessfully considered the question of Irish home rule.

In late 1918, McCarron set sail for Wales aboard the RMS Leinster, with fellow trade unionist Patrick Lynch. On 10 October, the ship was torpedoed and sank, with McCarron and Lynch among the dead. A large memorial in the form of a Celtic cross was erected in his memory in Derry City Cemetery.

Trade union offices
| Preceded by Peter Tevenan | Chair of the Parliamentary Committee of the Irish Trades Union Congress; 1897–1898 | Succeeded by W. J. Leahy |
| Preceded by Richard Wortley | President of the Irish Trades Union Congress; 1899 | Succeeded by George Leahy |
| Preceded by Stephen Dineen | President of the Irish Trade Union Congress; 1907 | Succeeded by John Murphy |
| Preceded by Michael Egan | President of the Irish Trade Union Congress; 1910 | Succeeded by David Robb Campbell |
