= John Simmons (trade unionist) =

Irish trade unionist

John Simmons (born 1852) was an Irish trade unionist.

Born in Carlow, Simmons was apprenticed as a carpenter when he was 15, and seven years later moved to Dublin. He joined the Dublin Regular Society of Carpenters. In 1882, he led a campaign to establish technical schools. He was a leading proponent of forming a trades council in the city, and in 1886 became the founding secretary of the Dublin Council of Trade Unions (DCTU).

Simmons attended meetings of the British Trades Union Congress between 1888 and 1894, and argued for a similar Irish body to be set up. In July 1891, he organised a conference of Irish trade unionists, which elected him as secretary of a committee to establish such an organisation. Despite efforts, it was unable to persuade the Belfast Trades Council to participate, and the matter rested until 1894. Simmons proposed a motion to the DCTU that a national organisation be established, and on this occasion the Irish Trades Union Congress (ITUC) was founded, with Simmons elected as its founding secretary.

Simmons was active in the Labour Electoral Association, and in 1889 was the first Irish delegate to attend its conference, also winning election to its committee. The Dublin Carpenters merged into the Amalgamated Society of Carpenters and Joiners (ASC&J) in 1891, and it was probably that union which financed his campaigns for election to Dublin Corporation in 1895 and 1899. In 1899, he was defeated for re-election as secretary of the ITUC. He remained active in the organisation, and in 1901 was part of a delegation to the UK Parliament, interviewing politicians about their support for Irish trade unionism.

Simmons was opposed to conflict within the trade union movement, and was happy to make the case for co-operation with the British Labour Representation Committee, or James Larkin's campaign to organise workers seen as unskilled. By 1915 he was in poor health, and offered his resignation as secretary of the DCTU. This was rejected, but his health did not improve, and he finally stood down in 1917.

Trade union offices
Preceded by Organisation founded	Secretary of the Irish Trades Union Congress; 1894–1899	Succeeded by Hugh McManus
Preceded by Council founded	Secretary of the Dublin Council of Trade Unions; 1886–1917	Succeeded by William O'Brien
