= P. T. Daly =

Irish trade unionist and politician (1870-1943)

Patrick Thomas Daly
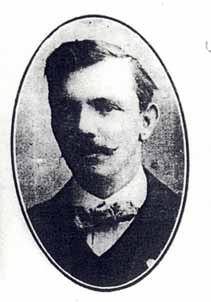
- Born: 1870; Dublin
- Died: 20 November 1943 (aged 72–73); Dublin
- Occupations: Trade unionist, printer
- Known for: Secretary of the Irish Trades Union Congress and the Dublin Trades Council

Patrick Thomas Daly (1870 – 20 November 1943), known as P. T. Daly was an Irish trade unionist and politician.

== Early life ==
Born in Dublin, Daly completed an apprenticeship as a printer, and in 1892 he joined the Dublin Typographical Provident Society. A supporter of James Connolly, he helped print Connolly's Workers Republic newspaper, and was a founder member of the Irish Socialist Republican Party (ISRP).

== Irish nationalism ==
Frustrated by the lack of progress of the ISRP, he left and joined the Young Ireland Society and the Irish Republican Brotherhood (IRB), soon becoming a member of its three-person executive. He was elected to the Dublin Corporation for the IRB in 1903, holding the seat until 1910. In 1905, he became manager of the Gaelic printer An Cló Cumann.

Daly was also active in Cumann na nGaedheal, and when it merged with the Dungannon Clubs to form the Sinn Féin League in 1907, he was elected as its president. The following year, he moved that it merge with Arthur Griffith's Sinn Féin, and served on the new party's first executive, also organising the Dublin Cumann. By 1910, he was part of a young clique which published Irish Freedom and sought to take control of the IRB, but he was expelled on charges of embezzling funds donated from the United States.

== Labour movement ==
Heavily involved in the labour movement, Daly was elected to Parliamentary Committee of the Irish Trades Union Congress (ITUC) in 1905. Long known as a leading supporter of Jim Larkin in the Irish Transport and General Workers' Union (ITGWU), he ran the union in 1910 while Larkin was in prison. However, in 1909, he was appointed as editor of the Dublin Trades Council newspaper, a post which Connolly had hoped to win. In 1910, Daly was elected Secretary of the Irish Trades Union Congress, serving until 1918, and in 1911 he was appointed as organiser of the Irish Transport and General Workers' Union, although that year he was jailed during a major strike for union recognition in Wexford.

In 1910, Daly left Sinn Féin to join Connolly's Socialist Party of Ireland, a merger of the ISRP and parts of the Independent Labour Party. He subsequently joined Connolly in founding the Irish Labour Party. During the Dublin Lock-out of 1913, he was one of several leading figures in the Labour movement who were arrested, and the following year, he was a founding vice-chairman of the Irish Citizen Army.

After James Larkin suggested appointing Daly to lead the ITGWU in 1914, a long-standing disagreement with William O'Brien became public, O'Brien claiming that Daly was incompetent. Daly had also split with Connolly, who wrote that "Daly is as little trusted by the Labour men as he is by the Nationalists", and was able to instead become acting secretary himself. Connolly also ensured that Daly was not selected as a candidate for the 1915 Dublin Harbour by-election.

In 1916, Daly was placed in Frongoch internment camp as the British Government considered him a threat during the Easter Rising; he was later moved to Reading Gaol. He worked with Delia Larkin in an attempt to resurrect the Irish Citizen Army, but this was unsuccessful, and led to further isolation in the ITGWU.

In 1919, Daly was elected as Secretary of the Dublin Trades Council, and he remained in the post until his death. Under his leadership, and due to his dispute with O'Brien, the council withdrew from the Labour Party. At the 1923 general election, Daly stood in Dublin North as one of four independent labour candidates sponsored by the trades council. Although he was not elected, Daly took 2,075 votes, beating the official Labour Party candidate. Following disappointing results, the trades council reaffiliated with the Labour Party, and Daly focused his efforts on establishing the Workers' Union of Ireland. He served on the executive of the ITUC again from 1936 to 1939, and was elected as its president for 1939.

Trade union offices
Preceded by F. Farrell	President of the Dublin Trades Council; 1905	Succeeded by John Farren
Preceded by E. L. Richardson	General Secretary of the Irish Trades Union Congress; 1910–1918	Succeeded by William O'Brien
Preceded by Thomas Farren	Secretary of the Dublin Trades Council; 1919–1943	Succeeded by Mark Daly
Preceded by Jeremiah Hurley	President of the Irish Trades Union Congress; 1939	Succeeded by Sam Kyle
