= Dominick Murphy =

Irish politician and trade union official (c.1918–2009)

Senator
- In office 22 July 1954 – 5 November 1969
- Constituency: Labour Panel

Personal details
- Born: c.1918
- Died: 1 June 2009 (aged 90–91)
- Party: Labour Party

Dominick F. Murphy (c. 1918 – 1 June 2009) was an Irish Labour Party politician and trade union official. He was a member of Seanad Éireann from 1954 to 1969. He was elected to the 8th Seanad in 1954 by the Labour Panel, and was re-elected at the 1957, 1961 and 1965 elections. He lost his seat at the 1969 Seanad election.

He was a member of the Transport Salaried Staffs' Association and was vice president (1963–1964) and president (1964–1965) of the Irish Congress of Trade Unions.

Trade union offices
Preceded by John Swift	Treasurer of the Irish Trades Union Congress; 1959	Position abolished
Preceded by Charles McCarthy	President of the Irish Congress of Trade Unions; 1965	Succeeded by Fintan Kennedy
