= Albin Taylor =

British trade unionist (1866–1936)

Albin Taylor (1866–1936) was a British trade union leader.

== Early life ==
Born in Castle Cary in Somerset, Taylor began working part-time when he was eight years old. He left home when he was fifteen, worked as a labourer constructing the Severn Tunnel before joining the Royal Marines in 1882. He served in Egypt in 1884, but was invalided out with a heart condition and was not awarded a pension.

Needing work, Taylor moved to London, where he found employment as a labourer, constructing the Charing Cross Road, then later working on the Beckton Northern Outfall. His work was highly regarded, and he found a permanent position with the London County Council. He also joined the Social Democratic Federation (SDF), where he held membership of the Canning Town branch, led by Will Thorne. He stood for West Ham Borough Council as an SDF candidate in 1891, narrowly missing out on election with 871 votes.

== Municipal Employees' Association ==
Taylor joined Thorne's National Union of Gas Workers and General Labourers, but from 1891 was also active in the rival Vestry Employees' Union, serving as secretary of its Northern Outfall branch. The Gas Workers expelled Taylor, arguing that his activities were undermining their union. In 1894, the general secretary of the Vestry Employees, John Cole, was dismissed for embezzling union funds and this experience led a group of London County Council workers to break away and form the LCC Employees' Labour Union, with Taylor as organiser. He proved successful, gradually increasing the union's membership and, after a few years, beginning to organise outside London, and was renamed as the "Municipal Employees' Association" (MEA).

In 1902, the MEA agreed to Taylor's proposal to appoint a full-time general secretary, and Taylor was elected to the post without facing an opponent. At first, this went well, membership doubling to 6,000 by 1906. However, a Trades Union Congress resolution against separation of public and private employees in trade unions, and Taylor's decision to dismiss North East District Secretary Peter Tevenan, led to a crisis. Tevenan, in particular, was a popular figure, and was able to persuade the union's executive and a small majority of members to vote to suspend Taylor. Taylor reacted by forming a rival union - soon named the National Union of Corporation Workers (NUCW) - and recruited many MEA members to it.

== National Union of Corporation Workers and politics ==
Despite an ongoing and bitter war of words with the new leadership of the MEA, Taylor was able to establish the NUCW. He championed its no strike policy, although many of the union's other leading members, such as Jim Bradley, were much more radical. Taylor enthusiastically welcomed the establishment of joint Whitley Councils for negotiations after World War I.

Taylor represented the MEA at the founding conference of the Labour Representation Committee, in 1900, and was soon elected to East Ham Borough Council for the Labour Party, serving as secretary of the Labour group from 1911. However, when Labour decided against standing a candidate in East Ham North at the 1918 UK general election, Taylor decided to speak on behalf of the Liberal candidate, causing Labour to drop him as a candidate in the 1919 council election. Taylor instead stood as an independent, but was narrowly defeated by the official Labour candidate.

By the early 1920s, Taylor's control of the NUCW was slipping. Members from outside his London support base established a majority on the Executive Committee and removed Taylor's personal vote on the committee. When assistant general secretary Tom McGrath died, Taylor refused to appoint a replacement. He began making public specific criticism of other full-time union officials, and threatened that a split along the lines of the 1907 event might result. Although he prevailed in the short-term, he found the situation increasingly stressful, and decided to retire in 1925.

Trade union offices
Preceded by William Anderson	General Secretary of the Municipal Employees' Association; 1902 – 1907	Succeeded by Richard Davies
Preceded by New position	General Secretary of the National Union of Corporation Workers; 1907 – 1925	Succeeded by Jack Wills
