= Municipal Employees' Association =

Former trade union of the United Kingdom

- Merged into: National Union of General and Municipal Workers
- Founded: 1888
- Dissolved: 1924
- Headquarters: 24 Fitzjohns Road, Hampstead, London
- Location: United Kingdom
- Members: 65,000 (1921)
- Key people: Albin Taylor; Peter J. Tevenan
- Affiliations: TUC, ITUC, Labour

The Municipal Employees' Association was a trade union representing local government workers in the United Kingdom.

The union was founded in 1888 as the London County Council Employees' Protection Association, to represent workers at the London County Council, which was formally constituted the following year. The union was initially led by William Anderson.

In 1899 it was renamed the National Association of County Authority Employees. It grew considerably after the collapse of the National Municipal Labour Union in 1900, and in 1901 it became the "Municipal Employees Association". In 1907, General Secretary Albin Taylor was dismissed by the union's General Council. The following year, he set up a break-away National Union of Corporation Workers. Nevertheless, by 1910, the Association had 13,500 members. Membership continued to grow under new general secretary Peter J. Tevenan, reaching a peak of 65,000 in 1921, with about one-fifth in London, and a further fifth in Scotland and Ireland.

In 1924, the Association merged with the National Union of General Workers and the National Amalgamated Union of Labour to form the National Union of General and Municipal Workers.

== General Secretaries ==
1894: William Anderson
1902: Albin Taylor
1907: Richard Davies
1913: Peter J. Tevenan
