= Thomas MacPartlin =

Irish trade unionist and politician (1879–1923)

Senator
- In office 11 December 1922 – 20 October 1923

Personal details
- Born: 22 August 1879 County Sligo, Ireland
- Died: 20 October 1923 (aged 44) Geneva, Switzerland
- Party: Labour Party
- Spouse: Hannah MacPartlin
- Children: 9

Thomas MacPartlin (22 August 1879 – 20 October 1923) was an Irish Labour Party politician. He was a member of Seanad Éireann from 1922 to 1923.

A trade union official from County Sligo, he was a member of the Amalgamated Society of Carpenters and Joiners union and served as the president of the Irish Trades Union Congress (ITUC) in 1917. He was a signatory of the 1914 ITUC manifesto opposing inclusion of a partition option in the draft home rule bill and asserting workers' right to arm and fight for 'economic freedom'. He was elected to the Free State Seanad for 9 years at the 1922 election.

He died in office in October 1923, while on a visit to Geneva. The by-election to fill the vacancy was held on 28 November 1923, and was won by Thomas Foran of the Labour Party.

Trade union offices
Preceded by Thomas Johnson	President of the Irish Trades Union Congress; 1917	Succeeded by William O'Brien
