= Dublin Council of Trade Unions =

Trades council for County Dublin, Ireland

The Dublin Council of Trade Unions is the trades council for County Dublin in Ireland.

In 1884, 34 craft unions were involved in organising an exhibition of artisan work in Dublin. This necessitated regular meetings, and encouraged the unions to continue working together. As a result, in 1886, 27 of the unions founded the Dublin Council of Trade Unions, with a meeting at the Odd Fellow's Hall. The organisation was successful, and by 1894 it was able to convene a meeting of trade unions from across Ireland, which formed the Irish Trades Union Congress (ITUC).

In the 1920s, supporters of the Irish Transport and General Workers' Union left the council to form the Dublin Workers' Council, while supporters of the Workers' Union of Ireland, led by P. T. Daly, dominated the council. They joined the Profintern and disaffiliated from the Labour Party. At the 1923 general election, the council put up four candidates in Dublin seats. None were elected, although Daly beat the official Labour Party candidate.

Following the 1945 split in the Irish Trades Union Congress, the Dublin Council split into the Dublin Council of Trade Unions and the Dublin Trades' Union Council. The two reunited in 1960, and the reunited organisation played a leading role in the Dublin Housing Action Committee.

== Secretaries ==
1886: John Simmons
1917: William O'Brien
1919: Thomas Farren
1919: P. T. Daly
1944: Mark Daly
1947: Terry Waldron
1954: Jim Collins
1960: Sean Dunne
1968: Tom Brady
1971: Tommy Watt
1978: Paddy Carmody
1979: Sam Nolan
2023: Des Derwin

== President ==
1884: Joseph Nannetti
1904: F. Farrell
1905: P. T. Daly
1907: John Lumsden
1908: W. McLoughlin
1909: Michael O'Lehane
1910: Henry Rochford
1913: Thomas MacPartlin
1914: William O'Brien
1915: Thomas Farren
1916: John Lawlor
1945: John Swift
1978-1981 : Mai Clifford
Ben Kearney
Jerry Shanahan
Paddy Trehy
Paddy Coughlan
Des Bonass
Tony Whelan
Mary Enright
Mick O'Reilly
2007-2009: Des Derwin
2009-2011: Phil McFadden
Pat Bolger
2018-2023: Betty Tyrrell-Collard
2023-2025: Finn Geaney
2025- Present Alison Regan
