= William O'Brien (trade unionist) =

Irish politician and trade unionist (1881–1968)

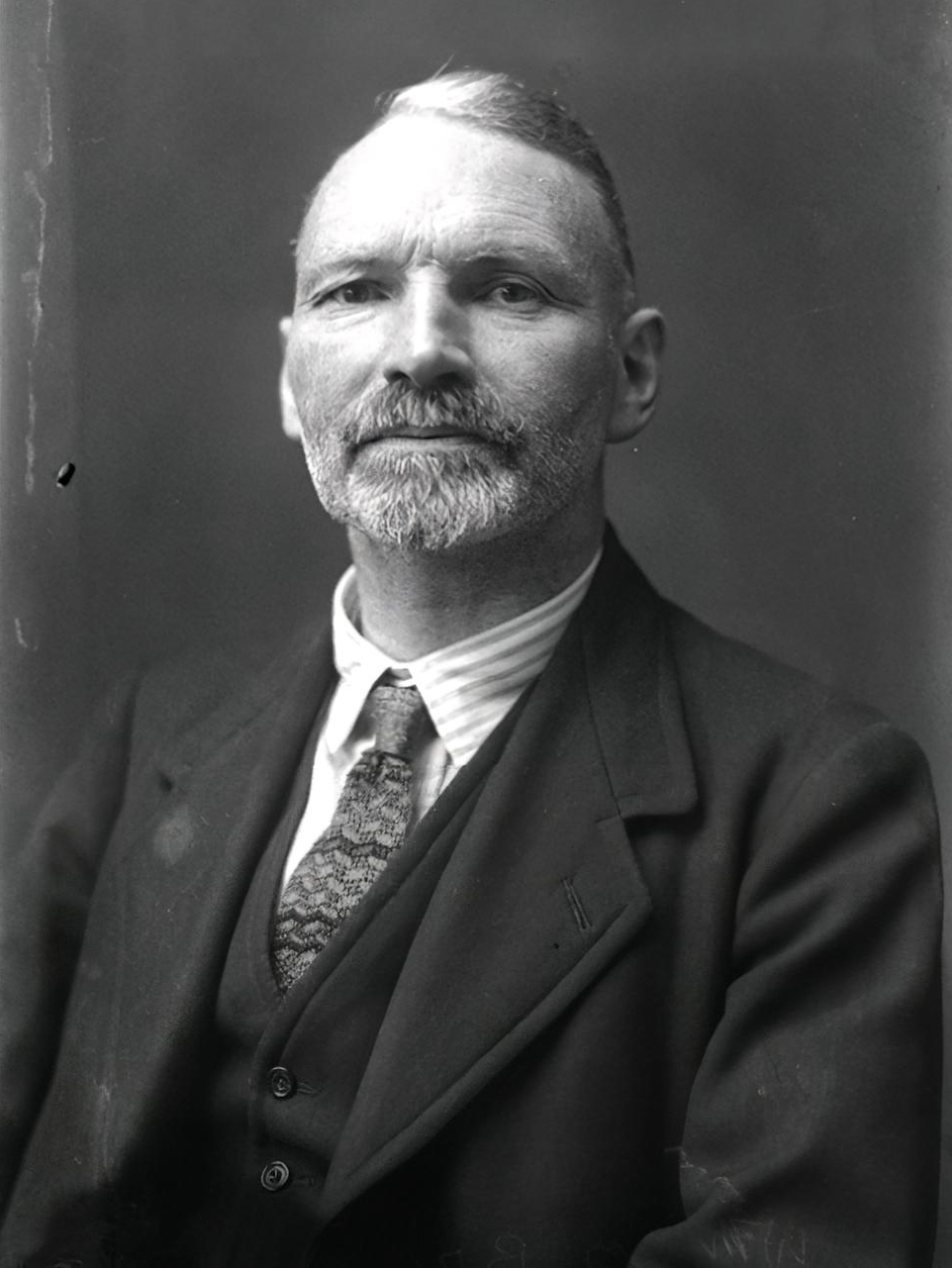
- O'Brien, c. 1930

Teachta Dála
- In office July 1937 – June 1938
- In office June 1927 – September 1927
- Constituency: Tipperary
- In office June 1922 – August 1923
- Constituency: Dublin South

Personal details
- Born: John William O'Brien; 23 January 1881 Clonakilty, County Cork, Ireland
- Died: 31 October 1968 (aged 87) Bray, County Wicklow, Ireland
- Resting place: Glasnevin cemetery, Dublin
- Party: National Labour Party (1944–1946); Labour Party (1912–1944)
- Occupation: Trade union leader

William O'Brien (23 January 1881 – 31 October 1968) was a politician and trade unionist in Ireland. While rarely dominating the political spotlight, O'Brien was incredibly powerful and influential behind the scenes, maintaining a firm grip over Ireland's trade unions for many decades. Besides his leadership in the trade unions, O'Brien was a founder, alongside James Larkin and James Connolly, of the Labour Party of Ireland. In later years a rift formed between Larkin and O'Brien that would last the rest of their lives and often divide the labour movement in Ireland.

== Early life ==
O'Brien was born in Ballygurteen, Clonakilty, County Cork on 23 January 1881, and was christened 'John William'. He was the fourth child and third son of Daniel O'Brien of County Tipperary and Mary O'Brien (née Butler) of County Kilkenny. His father Daniel, an Irish nationalist, devout Catholic, and Irish-language revivalist, had been a member of the Royal Irish Constabulary before retiring at the rank of Head Constable and moving the family to Dublin in 1886.

Upon moving to Dublin, O'Brien sought an occupation that could accommodate the fact he suffered from club foot and became a tailor.

== Career ==
=== Constructing the Irish Labour movement ===
It was not long after becoming involved in the tailor profession that O'Brien, like two of his brothers, became a trade union member, and from there he became involved in the Irish Socialist Republican Party (ISRP). O'Brien is described as "a very significant figure in the ISRP" by the historian of the ISRP, David Lynch. He was a member of the Socialist Party of Ireland, serving on its executive.

In 1908, believing in the importance of organising unskilled labourers, he supported the leadership of James Larkin in the formation of the Irish Transport and General Workers' Union. Together, O'Brien, Larkin and Connolly established the Labour Party of Ireland in 1912, in their minds as the "political wing" of the Irish Trades Union Congress. The three men's leadership would also be instrumental in the Dublin Lock-out strike in 1913, quite possibly the most significant trade union action of its era.

=== Easter Rising ===
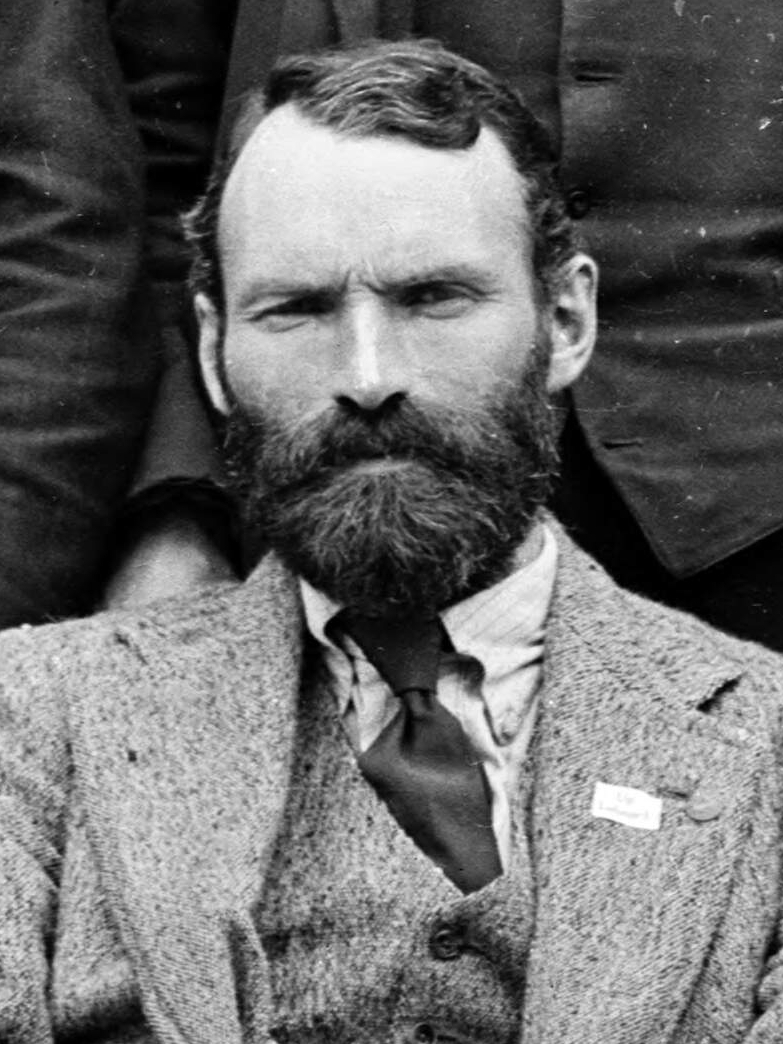
O'Brien in August 1918

O'Brien was not a direct participant in the 1916 Easter Rising, although he was highly active around Dublin as the event unfolded. Possibly because of his club-foot, Connolly told O'Brien "go home now and stay there; you can be of no use now but may be of great service later on". Despite this, O'Brien visited the GPO on the second day of the fighting to converse with Connolly about the ongoing situation. It was at O'Brien's home that Connolly sent his son Roddy to stay. O'Brien also encountered and spoke to his friend Francis Sheehy-Skeffington during the events of the Rising, one day before the murder of Sheehy-Skeffington by British forces. Towards the end of Easter week, both O'Brien and Roddy were arrested by British forces, with O'Brien held under suspicion of being a "Sinn Féin leader". They were held in Richmond Barracks in Inchicore with most of the other captured rebel leaders such as Thomas McDonagh, Eamonn Ceannt and Major John MacBride. Eventually, O'Brien was sent to a prison in Knutsford in England while the other detainees were executed. He was not able to return to Ireland until July 1916 when a general amnesty was created. In the aftermath of the Rising, O'Brien was one of the few prominent labour leaders still remaining, with Connolly now dead and Larkin having departed for the United States in 1914 after the lockout.

=== Irish revolutionary period ===
A member of the Irish Neutrality League and Anti-Conscription Committee, during World War I, O'Brien was interned on several occasions by the Dublin Castle government. During one of these instances, he stood in the 1920 Stockport by-election as the "Irish Republican Workers Party" candidate to push the British Labour Party into a more active stance on Irish self-determination, although the Home Secretary Edward Shortt refused to release him to campaign in it.

Upon the outbreak of the Irish War of Independence in 1920, ITGWU swelled to its largest ever size and some considered the possibility that the Irish Revolution would take a similar path to the Russian Revolution of 1917, with O'Brien playing the role of "an Irish Lenin" but taking the revolution in a Syndicalist direction. O'Brien and the other leaders of the Labour Party came to believe that massive unionisation rather than electoral politics was where their focus should lay. They also did not wish to impede the Nationalists from establishing an Independent Ireland separate from the United Kingdom. Thus, O'Brien and the Labour Party did not contest the 1918 Irish general election. They did, however, work together to draft the Democratic Programme, a document which had been intended to guide how the newly formed Irish state would operate.

O'Brien and the Labour Party did not oppose the Anglo-Irish Treaty. During the ensuing Irish Civil War between pro- and anti-treaty forces, the Labour movement campaigned for peace between both sides but could not halt the violence.

=== Post-revolutionary period ===
With the formation of the Irish Free State, O'Brien was elected as Teachta Dála (TD) for Dublin South at the 1922 general election. He lost his seat at the 1923 general election.

In 1923, Larkin returned from the United States and attempted to resume command of the entire Irish labour movement despite a decade's absence and not being present for the revolutionary period. In response, O'Brien sought to limit the powers of the ITWGU general secretary position. Larkin would not stand for this measure and generated a split by creating his own general worker's union, the Workers' Union of Ireland. This was the start of a long and terrible feud between O'Brien and Larkin that would ultimately see a decline in the influence of both unions, and Larkin generally kept out of the Labour Party.

O'Brien was elected for the Tipperary constituency in June 1927, losing his seat in September 1927. He was elected again for Tipperary at the 1937 general election, and lost his seat at the 1938 general election.

In 1930, O'Brien sought to have Leon Trotsky granted asylum in Ireland, but the head of the Free State government, W. T. Cosgrave, refused to allow it.

British Army intelligence file for William O'Brien

In 1944, there was an attempt made by Labour branches in Dublin to welcome Larkin back into the party. This resulted in accusations that the Labour Party was "being taken over by Communists". In response, O'Brien, James Everett and a number of followers broke away from Labour and formed the National Labour Party. The party would contest two general elections before reuniting with the Labour Party in 1950.

Ideologically, O'Brien was a Reformist and Democratic Socialist, believing that Irish socialists should bring about socialism via the ballot box, not through violence or direct action. Despite his Easter Rising links, he consistently avoided endorsing militancy as a tool of the labour movement in Ireland. This viewpoint contrasted strongly to the beliefs of Larkin and was partially why the two could not agree to co-operate. Only once did O'Brien seriously consider militancy; during the dawn of the Irish Civil War and fearing the worst, O'Brien and other Labour leaders turned towards the Irish Citizen Army, proposing the concept of a "Workers' Army", of which the ICA would form the nucleus. However, this idea was rebuffed. O'Brien was once asked if he was disappointed that the Irish electorate hadn't used their new parliamentary democracy to push for a stronger socialist presence; O'Brien reaffirmed his view by stating:

It is not for me or anybody else to determine how the people should exercise their democratic and constitutional rights. The main thing is that they should have these rights. How they use them is for them to decide.

Active in politics and the trade union movement into his 60s, O'Brien retired in 1946 and died on 31 October 1968. He was buried in Glasnevin cemetery, Dublin, on 3 November.

Trade union offices
Preceded by Michael O'Lehane	President of the Irish Trades Union Congress; 1913	Succeeded by James Larkin
Preceded by Thomas MacPartlin	President of the Dublin Trades Council; 1914	Succeeded by Thomas Farren
Preceded by John Simmons	Secretary of the Dublin Trades Council; 1917–1918	Succeeded by Thomas Farren
Preceded by Thomas MacPartlin	President of the Irish Trades Union Congress; 1918	Succeeded by Thomas Cassidy
Preceded by P. T. Daly	General Secretary of the Irish Trades Union Congress; 1918–1920	Succeeded by Thomas Johnson
Preceded by Thomas Johnson	Treasurer of the Irish Trades Union Congress; 1921–1924	Succeeded by Archie Heron
Preceded by James Larkin	General Secretary of the Irish Transport and General Workers' Union; 1924–1946	Succeeded by Thomas Kennedy?
Preceded by Luke Duffy	President of the Irish Trades Union Congress; 1925	Succeeded by Denis Cullen
Preceded by Archie Heron	Treasurer of the Irish Trades Union Congress; 1926–1929	Succeeded by Denis Cullen
Preceded by Sam Kyle	President of the Irish Trades Union Congress; 1941	Succeeded by Michael Colgan

Dáil	Election	Deputy (Party)	Deputy (Party)	Deputy (Party)	Deputy (Party)	Deputy (Party)	Deputy (Party)	Deputy (Party)
2nd	1921	Thomas Kelly (SF)	Daniel McCarthy (SF)	Constance Markievicz (SF)	Cathal Ó Murchadha (SF)	4 seats 1921–1923		
3rd	1922	Thomas Kelly (PT-SF)	Daniel McCarthy (PT-SF)	William O'Brien (Lab)	Myles Keogh (Ind.)	4 seats 1921–1923		
4th	1923	Philip Cosgrave (CnaG)	Daniel McCarthy (CnaG)	Constance Markievicz (Rep)	Myles Keogh (Ind.)	Cathal Ó Murchadha (Rep)	Michael Hayes (CnaG)	Peadar Doyle (CnaG)
4th	1923 by-election	Philip Cosgrave (CnaG)	Daniel McCarthy (CnaG)	Constance Markievicz (Rep)	Myles Keogh (Ind.)	Cathal Ó Murchadha (Rep)	Hugh Kennedy (CnaG)	Peadar Doyle (CnaG)
4th	March 1924 by-election	James O'Mara (CnaG)	Daniel McCarthy (CnaG)	Constance Markievicz (Rep)	Myles Keogh (Ind.)	Cathal Ó Murchadha (Rep)	Hugh Kennedy (CnaG)	Peadar Doyle (CnaG)
4th	November 1924 by-election	James O'Mara (CnaG)	Daniel McCarthy (CnaG)	Constance Markievicz (Rep)	Myles Keogh (Ind.)	Cathal Ó Murchadha (Rep)	Seán Lemass (SF)	Peadar Doyle (CnaG)
4th	1925 by-election	James O'Mara (CnaG)	Thomas Hennessy (CnaG)	Constance Markievicz (Rep)	Myles Keogh (Ind.)	Cathal Ó Murchadha (Rep)	Seán Lemass (SF)	Peadar Doyle (CnaG)
5th	1927 (Jun)	James Beckett (CnaG)	Vincent Rice (NL)	Constance Markievicz (FF)	Myles Keogh (Ind.)	Thomas Lawlor (Lab)	Seán Lemass (FF)	Peadar Doyle (CnaG)
5th	1927 by-election	James Beckett (CnaG)	Vincent Rice (NL)	Thomas Hennessy (CnaG)	Myles Keogh (Ind.)	Thomas Lawlor (Lab)	Seán Lemass (FF)	Peadar Doyle (CnaG)
6th	1927 (Sep)	James Beckett (CnaG)	Robert Briscoe (FF)	Thomas Hennessy (CnaG)	Myles Keogh (CnaG)	Frank Kerlin (FF)	Seán Lemass (FF)	Peadar Doyle (CnaG)
7th	1932	James Beckett (CnaG)	Robert Briscoe (FF)	Thomas Hennessy (CnaG)	Myles Keogh (CnaG)	James Lynch (FF)	Seán Lemass (FF)	Peadar Doyle (CnaG)
8th	1933	James Beckett (CnaG)	Robert Briscoe (FF)	James McGuire (CnaG)	Thomas Kelly (FF)	James Lynch (FF)	Seán Lemass (FF)	Peadar Doyle (CnaG)
9th	1937	Myles Keogh (FG)	Robert Briscoe (FF)	Thomas Lawlor (Lab)	Thomas Kelly (FF)	Joseph Hannigan (Ind.)	Seán Lemass (FF)	Peadar Doyle (FG)
10th	1938	James Beckett (FG)	Robert Briscoe (FF)	James Lynch (FF)	Thomas Kelly (FF)	Joseph Hannigan (Ind.)	Seán Lemass (FF)	Peadar Doyle (FG)
10th	1939 by-election	John McCann (FF)	Robert Briscoe (FF)	James Lynch (FF)	Thomas Kelly (FF)	Joseph Hannigan (Ind.)	Seán Lemass (FF)	Peadar Doyle (FG)
11th	1943	Maurice Dockrell (FG)	Robert Briscoe (FF)	James Lynch (FF)	James Larkin Jnr (Lab)	John McCann (FF)	Seán Lemass (FF)	Peadar Doyle (FG)
12th	1944	Maurice Dockrell (FG)	Robert Briscoe (FF)	James Lynch (FF)	James Larkin Jnr (Lab)	John McCann (FF)	Seán Lemass (FF)	Peadar Doyle (FG)
13th	1948	Constituency abolished. See Dublin South-Central, Dublin South-East and Dublin South-West.						

Dáil	Election	Deputy (Party)	Deputy (Party)	Deputy (Party)	Deputy (Party)	Deputy (Party)
22nd	1981	Niall Andrews (FF)	Séamus Brennan (FF)	Nuala Fennell (FG)	John Kelly (FG)	Alan Shatter (FG)
23rd	1982 (Feb)	Niall Andrews (FF)	Séamus Brennan (FF)	Nuala Fennell (FG)	John Kelly (FG)	Alan Shatter (FG)
24th	1982 (Nov)	Niall Andrews (FF)	Séamus Brennan (FF)	Nuala Fennell (FG)	John Kelly (FG)	Alan Shatter (FG)
25th	1987	Tom Kitt (FF)	Séamus Brennan (FF)	Anne Colley (PDs)	John Kelly (FG)	Alan Shatter (FG)
26th	1989	Tom Kitt (FF)	Séamus Brennan (FF)	Nuala Fennell (FG)	Roger Garland (GP)	Alan Shatter (FG)
27th	1992	Tom Kitt (FF)	Séamus Brennan (FF)	Liz O'Donnell (PDs)	Eithne FitzGerald (Lab)	Alan Shatter (FG)
28th	1997	Tom Kitt (FF)	Séamus Brennan (FF)	Liz O'Donnell (PDs)	Olivia Mitchell (FG)	Alan Shatter (FG)
29th	2002	Tom Kitt (FF)	Séamus Brennan (FF)	Liz O'Donnell (PDs)	Olivia Mitchell (FG)	Eamon Ryan (GP)
30th	2007	Tom Kitt (FF)	Séamus Brennan (FF)	Alan Shatter (FG)	Olivia Mitchell (FG)	Eamon Ryan (GP)
30th	2009 by-election	Tom Kitt (FF)	George Lee (FG)	Alan Shatter (FG)	Olivia Mitchell (FG)	Eamon Ryan (GP)
31st	2011	Shane Ross (Ind.)	Peter Mathews (FG)	Alan Shatter (FG)	Olivia Mitchell (FG)	Alex White (Lab)
32nd	2016	Constituency abolished. See Dublin Rathdown, Dublin South-West and Dún Laoghaire.				

Dáil	Election	Deputy (Party)	Deputy (Party)	Deputy (Party)	Deputy (Party)	Deputy (Party)	Deputy (Party)	Deputy (Party)
4th	1923	Dan Breen (Rep)	Séamus Burke (CnaG)	Louis Dalton (CnaG)	Daniel Morrissey (Lab)	Patrick Ryan (Rep)	Michael Heffernan (FP)	Seán McCurtin (CnaG)
5th	1927 (Jun)	Seán Hayes (FF)	Séamus Burke (CnaG)	John Hassett (CnaG)	Daniel Morrissey (Lab)	William O'Brien (Lab)	Michael Heffernan (FP)	Andrew Fogarty (FF)
6th	1927 (Sep)	Seán Hayes (FF)	Séamus Burke (CnaG)	John Hassett (CnaG)	Daniel Morrissey (Lab)	Timothy Sheehy (FF)	Michael Heffernan (FP)	Andrew Fogarty (FF)
7th	1932	Seán Hayes (FF)	Séamus Burke (CnaG)	John Hassett (CnaG)	Daniel Morrissey (Ind.)	Timothy Sheehy (FF)	Dan Breen (FF)	Andrew Fogarty (FF)
8th	1933	Seán Hayes (FF)	Séamus Burke (CnaG)	Richard Curran (NCP)	Daniel Morrissey (CnaG)	Martin Ryan (FF)	Dan Breen (FF)	Andrew Fogarty (FF)
9th	1937	William O'Brien (Lab)	Séamus Burke (FG)	Jeremiah Ryan (FG)	Daniel Morrissey (FG)	Martin Ryan (FF)	Dan Breen (FF)	Andrew Fogarty (FF)
10th	1938	Frank Loughman (FF)	Richard Curran (FG)	Jeremiah Ryan (FG)	Daniel Morrissey (FG)	Martin Ryan (FF)	Dan Breen (FF)	Andrew Fogarty (FF)
11th	1943	Richard Stapleton (Lab)	William O'Donnell (CnaT)	Jeremiah Ryan (FG)	Daniel Morrissey (FG)	Martin Ryan (FF)	Dan Breen (FF)	Andrew Fogarty (FF)
12th	1944	Frank Loughman (FF)	William O'Donnell (CnaT)	Richard Mulcahy (FG)	Daniel Morrissey (FG)	Mary Ryan (FF)	Dan Breen (FF)	Andrew Fogarty (FF)
12th	1947 by-election	Frank Loughman (FF)	Patrick Kinane (CnaP)	Richard Mulcahy (FG)	Daniel Morrissey (FG)	Mary Ryan (FF)	Dan Breen (FF)	Andrew Fogarty (FF)
13th	1948	Constituency abolished. See Tipperary North and Tipperary South						

Dáil	Election	Deputy (Party)	Deputy (Party)	Deputy (Party)	Deputy (Party)	Deputy (Party)
32nd	2016	Séamus Healy (WUA)	Alan Kelly (Lab)	Jackie Cahill (FF)	Michael Lowry (Ind.)	Mattie McGrath (Ind.)
33rd	2020	Martin Browne (SF)	Alan Kelly (Lab)	Jackie Cahill (FF)	Michael Lowry (Ind.)	Mattie McGrath (Ind.)
34th	2024	Constituency abolished. See Tipperary North and Tipperary South				
