= Irish Bakers' National Amalgamated Union =

The Irish Bakers' National Amalgamated Union was a trade union in Ireland.

The union was founded in 1889 as the Irish National Federal Union of Bakers by twenty-one local unions, and its membership soon reached 1,000. Heavy recruitment at the start of the twentieth century increased this to 3,000, this meaning that it was the largest member of the Irish Congress of Trade Unions in 1901. However, a lock-out in Dublin harmed the union, and by 1910 membership was barely a tenth of its peak. In 1918, the union was renamed as the Irish Bakers, Confectioners and Allied Workers Amalgamated Union, and membership recovered to 2,000, then 5,000 by the 1950s. In 1977, the union merged with the British-based Bakers, Food and Allied Workers Union.

== Secretaries ==
1900s: Robert Wilson
1920s: Denis Cullen
1942: John Swift
1967: James Young
