= Irish Distributive and Administrative Trade Union =

- Merged into: Mandate
- Founded: 1901
- Dissolved: 1994
- Location: Ireland
- Members: 17,122 (1970)
- Affiliations: ICTU

The Irish Distributive and Administrative Union (IDATU) was a trade union representing workers in Ireland.

The union was founded in 1901 as the Irish Drapers' Assistants' Association by Michael O'Lehane. O'Lehane had been working at Cannocks in Limerick where several female shop workers living on the premises died in a major fire. O'Lehane relocated to Dublin, where he founded the union.

In 1902, O'Lehane travelled around Ireland, recruiting members for the IDAA, with a branch being set up in Galway and over the next few years in other towns and cities. The union focused its campaigns on reducing working hours, creating a half-day holiday per week, and setting up agreements to cover overtime pay. The IDAA attracted particular attention for recruiting women. By 1914, 1,400 of its 4,000 members were women.

O'Lehane stood down as secretary in 1919, being succeeded by several high-profile trade unionists, including Luke Duffy, Michael Drumgoole and Billy Fitzpatrick. The union changed its name to the Irish Union of Distributive Workers and Clerks (IUDWC), and in 1935 it merged with the Commercial Employees' Union. Membership varied greatly over the years, falling as low as 6,443 in 1930, but reaching 15,579 in 1950, and more than 17,122 in 1970. In 1985, the union took its final name, the "Irish Distributive and Administrative Union".

The union experienced rapid growth in the 1980s under the stewardship of General Secretary John Mitchell, who was seen as a left-winger. In 1984 a number of female workers and one man at Dunnes Stores department store in Henry Street, Dublin refused to sell South African grapefruits as part of the growing campaign against the Apartheid regime then in power. Mitchell gave full support to the workers and a long strike / lockout ensued. The action made international headlines and at one stage a delegation of eight of the Dunnes Workers led by IDATU Official Brendan Archbold were expelled from South Africa where they had gone to meet Archbishop Desmond Tutu.

Mitchell was ousted from his position in 1988, leading to a major controversy and claims of unfair dismissal from himself and leading supporters. He was also heavily criticised for expanding the union into Northern Ireland where a row took place with the rival GMB union. Mitchell took legal action to secure reinstatement but eventually the union made a settlement with him, but he was not reinstated.

In 1994, IDATU merged with the Irish National Union of Vintners', Grocers' and Allied Trades Assistants to form Mandate.

== General Secretaries ==
1901: Michael O'Lehane
1920: John G. Gilloway
1922: Luke Duffy
1933: Michael Drumgoole
1954: Billy Fitzpatrick
1983: John Mitchell
1989: Hugh Pollock
1992: Owen Nulty
