= Thomas Johnson (Irish politician) =

Irish politician (1872–1963)

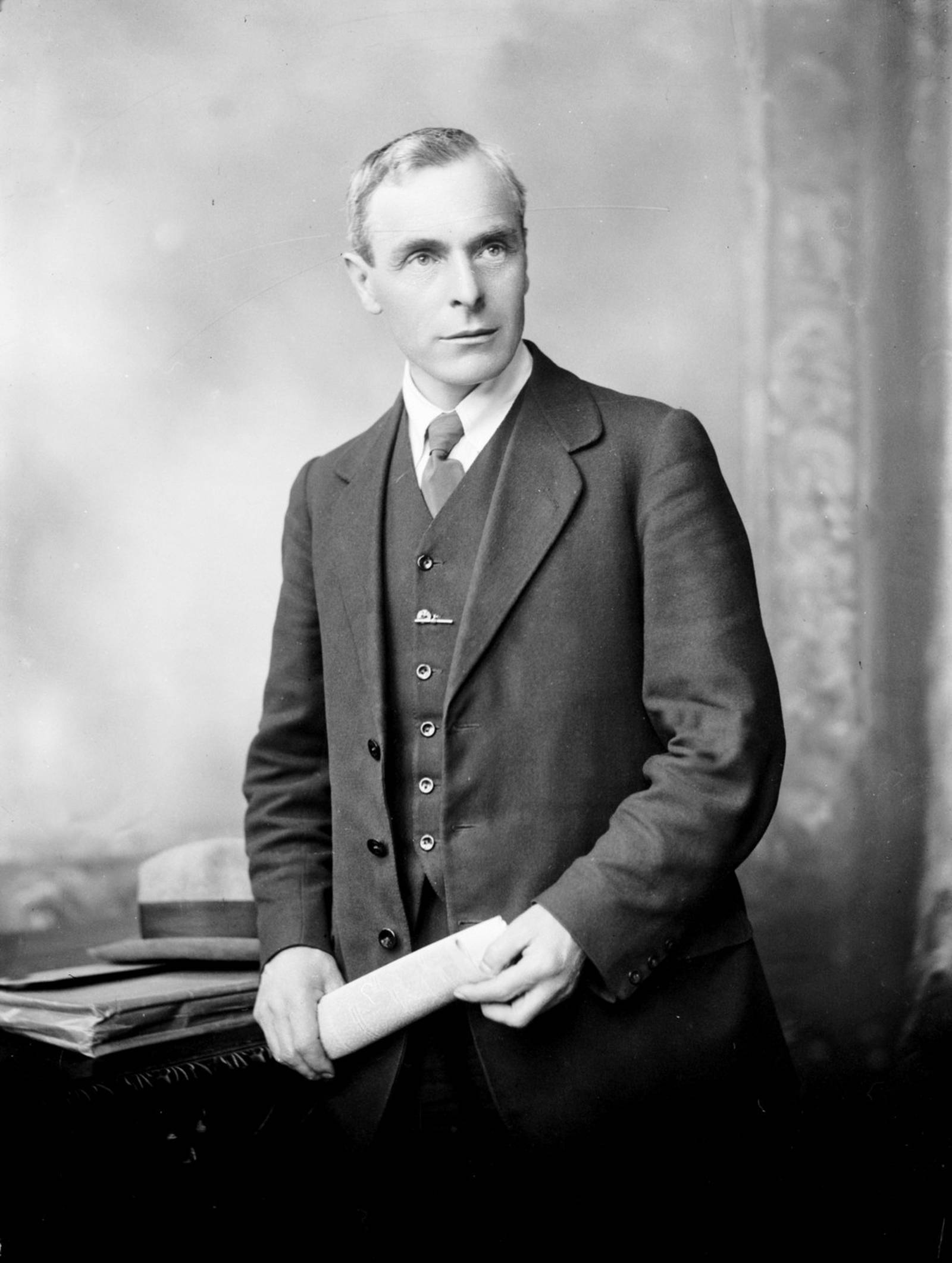
- Johnson, c.1920

Senator
- In office 12 December 1928 – 29 May 1936

Leader of the Opposition
- In office 6 December 1922 – 11 August 1927
- Taoiseach: W. T. Cosgrave
- Preceded by: New title
- Succeeded by: Éamon de Valera

Teachta Dála
- In office June 1922 – September 1927
- Constituency: Dublin County

Leader of the Labour Party
- In office 1914 – 11 August 1927
- Preceded by: James Connolly
- Succeeded by: Thomas J. O'Connell

Personal details
- Born: 17 May 1872 Liverpool, England
- Died: 17 January 1963 (aged 90) Clontarf, Dublin, Ireland
- Party: Labour
- Spouse: Marie Tregay (m. 1898)
- Children: 1

Thomas Ryder Johnson (17 May 1872 – 17 January 1963) was an Irish Labour Party politician and trade unionist who served as Leader of the Opposition from 1922 to 1927 and Leader of the Labour Party from 1914 to 1927. He served as a Teachta Dála (TD) for Dublin County from 1922 to 1927. He was a Senator for the Labour Panel from 1928 to 1934.

== Early life ==
Born in Liverpool, Johnson worked on the docks for an Irish fish merchant, spending much of his time in Dunmore East and Kinsale. It was this way that he picked up ideas about socialism and Irish nationalism, joining in 1893 a Liverpool branch of the Independent Labour Party. In 1900 he started work as a commercial traveller, then moved in 1903 with his family to Belfast where he became involved in trade union and labour politics.

== Labour activist ==
In 1907 Johnson helped James Larkin organise a strike in the port, but had to watch in dismay as the strike, which began with remarkable solidarity between labour, Orange, and nationalist supporters, collapsed in sectarian rioting. At various times he was the president, treasurer and secretary of the Irish Trades Union Congress (ITUC) which was, at that time, also the Labour Party in Ireland, until officially founded in 1912 by James Connolly and James Larkin. Johnson became vice-president of ITUC in 1913, and president in 1914.

Johnson sympathized with the Irish Volunteers, many of whom were sacked from their jobs, for illegal activities. During the Easter Rising, he noted in his diary that people in Ireland paid little heed to the fate of the defeated revolutionaries. He succeeded as leader of the Labour Party from 1917, when the party did not contest the 1918 general election. When the British government tried to enforce conscription in Ireland in 1918, Johnson led a successful strike in conjunction with other members of the Irish anti-conscription movement.

== Politician ==
British Army intelligence file on Thomas Johnson (1922)

He was later elected a TD for Dublin County to the Third Dáil at the 1922 general election and remained leader of the Labour Party until 1927. As such, he was Leader of the Opposition in the Dáil of the Irish Free State, as the anti-treaty faction of Sinn Féin refused to recognise the Dáil as constituted. He issued a statement of support for the Government of the 4th Dáil when the Army Mutiny threatened civilian control in March 1924.

== Later life ==
Johnson is the only Leader of the Labour Party who served as Leader of the Opposition in the Dáil. He lost his Dáil seat at the September 1927 general election, and the following year he was elected to Seanad Éireann, where he served until the Seanad's abolition in 1936.

In 1896 he met Marie Tregay, then a teacher in St. Multose's National school, outside Kinsale. They married in 1898 in Liverpool. Their only son born in 1899, Frederick Johnson, became a well-known actor. Thomas Johnson died on 17 January 1963 at 49 Mount Prospect Avenue, Clontarf, Dublin.

Each summer, Labour Youth holds the "Tom Johnson Summer School" to host panel discussions, debates and workshops.

Party political offices
New title	Leader of the Opposition; 1922–1927	Succeeded by Éamon de Valera
Preceded by James Connolly	Leader of the Labour Party; 1917–1927	Succeeded by Thomas J. O'Connell
Trade union offices
Preceded by James Larkin	President of the Irish Trades Union Congress; 1916	Succeeded by Thomas MacPartlin
Preceded by David Robb Campbell	Treasurer of the Irish Trades Union Congress; 1919–1920	Succeeded by William O'Brien
Preceded by Cathal O'Shannon	General Secretary of the Irish Trades Union Congress; 1945	Succeeded by Ruaidhri Roberts

Dáil	Election	Deputy (Party)	Deputy (Party)	Deputy (Party)	Deputy (Party)	Deputy (Party)	Deputy (Party)	Deputy (Party)	Deputy (Party)
2nd	1921	Michael Derham (SF)	George Gavan Duffy (SF)	Séamus Dwyer (SF)	Desmond FitzGerald (SF)	Frank Lawless (SF)	Margaret Pearse (SF)	6 seats 1921–1923	
3rd	1922	Michael Derham (PT-SF)	George Gavan Duffy (PT-SF)	Thomas Johnson (Lab)	Desmond FitzGerald (PT-SF)	Darrell Figgis (Ind)	John Rooney (FP)	6 seats 1921–1923	
4th	1923	Michael Derham (CnaG)	Bryan Cooper (Ind)	Thomas Johnson (Lab)	Desmond FitzGerald (CnaG)	Darrell Figgis (Ind)	John Good (Ind)	Kathleen Lynn (Rep)	Kevin O'Higgins (CnaG)
4th	1924 by-election	Batt O'Connor (CnaG)	Bryan Cooper (Ind)	Thomas Johnson (Lab)	Desmond FitzGerald (CnaG)	Darrell Figgis (Ind)	John Good (Ind)	Kathleen Lynn (Rep)	Kevin O'Higgins (CnaG)
4th	1926 by-election	Batt O'Connor (CnaG)	Bryan Cooper (Ind)	Thomas Johnson (Lab)	Desmond FitzGerald (CnaG)	William Norton (Lab)	John Good (Ind)	Kathleen Lynn (Rep)	Kevin O'Higgins (CnaG)
5th	1927 (Jun)	Batt O'Connor (CnaG)	Bryan Cooper (Ind)	Thomas Johnson (Lab)	Desmond FitzGerald (CnaG)	Patrick Belton (FF)	John Good (Ind)	Seán MacEntee (FF)	Kevin O'Higgins (CnaG)
5th	1927 by-election	Batt O'Connor (CnaG)	Bryan Cooper (Ind)	Thomas Johnson (Lab)	Desmond FitzGerald (CnaG)	Patrick Belton (FF)	John Good (Ind)	Seán MacEntee (FF)	Gearóid O'Sullivan (CnaG)
6th	1927 (Sep)	Batt O'Connor (CnaG)	Bryan Cooper (CnaG)	Joseph Murphy (Ind)	Desmond FitzGerald (CnaG)	Seán Brady (FF)	John Good (Ind)	Seán MacEntee (FF)	Gearóid O'Sullivan (CnaG)
6th	1930 by-election	Batt O'Connor (CnaG)	Thomas Finlay (CnaG)	Joseph Murphy (Ind)	Desmond FitzGerald (CnaG)	Seán Brady (FF)	John Good (Ind)	Seán MacEntee (FF)	Gearóid O'Sullivan (CnaG)
7th	1932	Batt O'Connor (CnaG)	Thomas Finlay (CnaG)	Patrick Curran (Lab)	Henry Dockrell (CnaG)	Seán Brady (FF)	John Good (Ind)	Seán MacEntee (FF)	Gearóid O'Sullivan (CnaG)
8th	1933	Batt O'Connor (CnaG)	John A. Costello (CnaG)	Margaret Mary Pearse (FF)	Henry Dockrell (CnaG)	Seán Brady (FF)	John Good (Ind)	Seán MacEntee (FF)	Gearóid O'Sullivan (CnaG)
8th	1935 by-election	Cecil Lavery (FG)	John A. Costello (CnaG)	Margaret Mary Pearse (FF)	Henry Dockrell (CnaG)	Seán Brady (FF)	John Good (Ind)	Seán MacEntee (FF)	Gearóid O'Sullivan (CnaG)
9th	1937	Cecil Lavery (FG)	Henry Dockrell (FG)	Gerrard McGowan (Lab)	Patrick Fogarty (FF)	Seán Brady (FF)	5 seats 1937–1948		
10th	1938	Patrick Belton (FG)	Henry Dockrell (FG)	Thomas Mullen (FF)	Patrick Fogarty (FF)	Seán Brady (FF)	5 seats 1937–1948		
11th	1943	Liam Cosgrave (FG)	Henry Dockrell (FG)	James Tunney (Lab)	Patrick Fogarty (FF)	Seán Brady (FF)	5 seats 1937–1948		
12th	1944	Liam Cosgrave (FG)	Henry Dockrell (FG)	Patrick Burke (FF)	Patrick Fogarty (FF)	Seán Brady (FF)	5 seats 1937–1948		
12th	1947 by-election	Liam Cosgrave (FG)	Henry Dockrell (FG)	Patrick Burke (FF)	Seán MacBride (CnaP)	Seán Brady (FF)	5 seats 1937–1948		
13th	1948	Éamon Rooney (FG)	Seán Dunne (Lab)	Patrick Burke (FF)	3 seats 1948–1961				
14th	1951	Éamon Rooney (FG)	Seán Dunne (Lab)	Patrick Burke (FF)	3 seats 1948–1961				
15th	1954	Éamon Rooney (FG)	Seán Dunne (Lab)	Patrick Burke (FF)	3 seats 1948–1961				
16th	1957	Éamon Rooney (FG)	Kevin Boland (FF)	Patrick Burke (FF)	3 seats 1948–1961				
17th	1961	Éamon Rooney (FG)	Kevin Boland (FF)	Patrick Burke (FF)	Mark Clinton (FG)	Seán Dunne (Ind)	5 seats 1961–1969		
18th	1965	Des Foley (FF)	Kevin Boland (FF)	Patrick Burke (FF)	Mark Clinton (FG)	Seán Dunne (Lab)	5 seats 1961–1969		
19th	1969	Constituency abolished. See Dublin County North and Dublin County South							
