= Amalgamated Slaters', Tilers' and Roofing Operatives' Society =

Former trade union of the United Kingdom

The Amalgamated Slaters', Tilers' and Roofing Operatives' Society was a trade union representing slaters in England, Ireland and Wales.

The union was founded in 1873 in Sheffield, as a federation of local unions from Birmingham, Kingston-upon-Hull, Liverpool, Newcastle, Nottingham, South Shields, Stockton-on-Tees, Sunderland and York. In 1885, the federation was reconstituted as an amalgamated union named the Amalgamated Slaters of England Provident Society, by which time it was based in Newcastle, and had only a very low membership - just 167 workers in 1887.

In its early years, the union focused on the welfare of its members, and secondarily on regulation of the trade, to prevent too many people competing for work. In order to encourage this, men aged under twenty-one could join the union for free, but older men had to pay increasingly high entry fees.

Membership of the union grew steadily, reaching 318 in 1890, 1,039 by 1896 and peaking at 1,497 in 1900. In 1896, the Regular Operative Slaters' Society of Dublin merged in, although a minority of that union objected to the merger and instead formed the National Operative Slaters and Tilers of Dublin. Around this time, the Amalgamated Slaters changed its name to the Amalgamated Slaters and Tilers Provident Society of England and Ireland, but it generally remained known by its earlier title. In 1906, R. Wilson was appointed as its first full-time general secretary, but he was unable to aid with recruitment, membership falling below 1,000 by 1910.

The union adopted its final name, the "Amalgamated Slaters', Tilers' and Roofing Operatives' Society", in 1963, then merged into the Amalgamated Union of Building Trade Workers in 1969. It was one of the last small craft unions in the industry to join a larger union.

== General Secretaries ==
1906: Robert Wilson
1937: C. G. Davison
1954: Laurie Poupard
