= National Society of Brushmakers and General Workers =

Former trade union of the United Kingdom

The National Society of Brushmakers and General Workers was a trade union in the United Kingdom.

The union dated its establishment to 1747, when the Manchester Society of Brushmakers was founded. By 1839, the United Society of Brushmakers had been established, which appears to have incorporated the Manchester Society, and gradually absorbed local unions of brushmakers from around the country.

Initially, the union focused on welfare payments for members, and set a high entrance fee - 20 shillings by the 1880s. Perhaps as a result of this, membership in the 19th-century never reached 2,000. In about 1900, it was renamed as the National Society of Brushmakers, and was recognised by the Trades Union Congress (TUC) as the oldest union in the country.

The union was known for never undertaking a strike. By the end of the 1960s, it had around 6,000 members, and in 1971 it added "and General Workers" to its name. Two years later, it was expelled from the TUC for registering with the government, in defiance of the congress' policy, but it was permitted to rejoin the following year. In 1983, the union merged into the Furniture, Timber and Allied Trades Union.

== General Secretaries ==
1900s: S. G. Porter
1920: George Mayes
1960: Thomas Bowen Thomas
1973: A. W. Godfrey
