= National Union of Public Employees =

Former trade union of the United Kingdom

- Merged with: NALGO and COHSE
- Founded: 1908
- Dissolved: 1993
- Headquarters: Civic House, 8 Aberdeen Terrace, London
- Location: United Kingdom
- Members: 693,100 (1977)
- Publication: NUPE Journal
- Affiliations: TUC, Labour

The National Union of Public Employees (NUPE) was a British trade union which existed between 1908 and 1993. It represented public sector workers in local government, the Health Service, universities, and water authorities.

== History ==
The union was founded in 1908 as the National Union of Corporation Workers, which split from the Municipal Employees Association, following Albin Taylor's dismissal as General Secretary. The union became NUPE in 1928.

NUPE grew rapidly during the post-Second World War expansion of the public sector, and especially during the 1960s and early 1970s. It grew from a membership of 250,100 in 1966 to 693,100 members in 1977, making it the fifth largest union in Britain. It was particularly successful in recruiting amongst sections of the workforce previously seen as a lower priority by rival trade unions (primarily the TGWU and the GMWU), such as part-time women workers, and it was these members who made NUPE the largest manual workers' union in local government by the 1970s.

NUPE had regional and area offices across the whole of Britain and was active in the mobilisation of employees in those parts of the public sector where it had substantial membership (local government, the NHS, the universities, and the publicly owned water authorities) against the attacks on trade union organisation and workers' rights by the Thatcher government from 1979.

In 1993, NUPE merged with NALGO (the National and Local Government Officers Association) and COHSE (the Confederation of Health Service Employees) to form UNISON.

A similarly named trade union existed in Canada in the first half of the 20th century. A similarly named union exists in New Zealand as of 2012.

== General Secretaries ==
1908: Albin Taylor
1925: Jack Wills
1934: Bryn Roberts
1962: Sydney Hill
1968: Alan Fisher
1982: Rodney Bickerstaffe
