= William Grant =

William Grant may refer to:

== Politicians ==
- Sir William Grant (Master of the Rolls) (1752–1832), Member of the Parliament, 1790–1812; Master of the Rolls, 1801–1817
- William Grant (Northern Ireland politician) (1883–1949), Unionist M.P. for the Northern Ireland House of Commons
- William Grant (seigneur) (1744–1805), Scottish-born businessman, seigneur and political figure in Lower Canada
- William Grant, Lord Grant (1909–1972), Scottish Unionist politician and judge
- William Grant, Lord Prestongrange (1701–1764), Scottish politician and judge
- William M. Grant (1868–1931), politician in Saskatchewan, Canada
- Bill Grant (British politician) (William Grant, born 1951), British Conservative MP for Ayr, Carrick and Cumnock

== Sportsmen ==
- William St Clair Grant (cricketer) (1894–1918), Scottish cricketer and British Army officer
- William St Clair Grant (rugby union) (1853–1896), his father, Scottish rugby union player
- William Grant (footballer) (1905–1994), English footballer, played for Blackpool F.C.
- Bill Grant (curler) (William Alexander Grant, 1882–1942), Canadian curler
- Bill Grant (Gaelic footballer) (William Grant, 1891–1955), Irish Gaelic footballer

== Military ==
- Sir William Keir Grant (1772–1852), British Army general
- Sir William Lowther Grant (1864–1928), Royal Navy officer
- William Grant (general) (1870–1939), Australian Army colonel and temporary Brigadier General in World War I

== Others ==
- William Grant & Sons, family-owned company that distills Scotch whisky and other spirits
  - William Grant (businessman) (1839–1923), founder of the company William Grant & Sons
- William Grant (fur trader) (1743–1810), Scottish-born fur trader in Lower Canada
- St. William Grant (1894–1977), Jamaican trade unionist and activist
- William Grant (New Zealand) (1843–1910), New Zealand shepherd, stock dealer, landowner
- William F. Grant (born 1924), Canadian plant geneticist, biosystematist, educator, and environmental advocate
- William Thomas Grant (1876–1972), American philanthropist and founder of the W. T. Grant stores
- William James Grant (1829–1866), English painter
- William Grant (priest), Archdeacon then Dean of Tuam
- William K. Grant, American diplomat
- William Grant (physician) (died 1786), Scottish physician
- William Grant (1873–1932), journalist and founder of the Stornoway Gazette
- William Grant, see Fred M. Hechinger Grand Prize for Distinguished Education Reporting

== See also ==
- Will Grant (born 1954), American football player
- Bill Grant (disambiguation)
- Mount William Grant, a mountain in New Zealand
