= John McGuffin =

- McGuffin, c. 1970s
- Born: 1942
- Died: 2002 (aged 59–60)
- Education: Campbell College; Queen's University Belfast
- Occupations: Lecturer, defence lawyer, writer
- Organization: People's Democracy

John McGuffin (1942–2002) was an anarchist from Northern Ireland who was prominently involved with People's Democracy upon the onset of the Troubles in the 1970s.

== Biography ==
McGuffin was born in 1942 into a middle-class Presbyterian family. His uncle Samuel McGuffin was a Labour Unionist member of parliament for Belfast Shankill from 1917 to 1921 and then for Belfast North between 1921 and 1925. As a young man, John McGuffin attended Campbell College in Belfast and then Queen's University Belfast, where he earned a degree in history and psychology. McGuffin subsequently took up a lecturer's post at Belfast Technical College.

While still attending Queen's University, McGuffin became a prominent figure in People's Democracy, one of the main organisations involved in the Northern Ireland civil rights movement. As part of People's Democracy, he was involved in a march from Belfast to Derry that was halted by the Burntollet Bridge incident, in which 300 counter-protesters (100 of whom were off-duty members of the Ulster Special Constabulary) attacked the marchers, an event which led to immediate riots in Derry and was a precursor to the Battle of the Bogside. It was during this period that McGuffin was a founding member of the Belfast Anarchist Group.

As part of Operation Demetrius, on 9 August 1971 McGuffin was arrested by the British authorities and interned until 14 September 1971. Upon his release, he began to support the Northern Resistance Movement, an Irish republican rival of the non-partisan Northern Ireland Civil Rights Association. In general, McGuffin's internment saw him shift further towards an Irish nationalist viewpoint. Nonetheless, McGuffin denounced the Provisional IRA for Bloody Friday (1972) in which nine people were killed and 130 injured in a series of city centre bombings, writing "Twenty-two bombs in the heart of a crowded city in broad daylight are bound to kill people no matter what warnings are given, and the Provisional IRA must bear the full responsibilities for these murders." McGuffin's imprisonment also led to his writing two books on the subject of imprisonment; Internment in 1973 and The Guinea Pigs in 1974. From 1974 to 1981, McGuffin wrote for An Phoblacht under the pseudonym "the Brigadier", in a column which satirised the British army and its view of Northern Ireland.

In the mid-1970s, McGuffin served as a part of an international committee which investigated the deaths in custody of members of the Red Army Faction in West Germany. In 1978, he wrote another book, In Praise of Poteen, in which he lauded the "talent and anti-authoritarian spirit" of makers of poteen.

In the 1980s, McGuffin left Northern Ireland and migrated to San Francisco in the United States. There, he worked as a criminal defence and human rights lawyer for 15 years.

McGuffin was buried in a tee-shirt reading "Unrepentant Fenian Bastard".

In 2012, Free Derry Corner was painted in an anarchist motif to commemorate the 10th anniversary of his death.

== Bibliography ==
- Internment (1973)
- The Guinea Pigs (1974)
- In Praise of Poteen (1978)
- Charles Nomad McGuinness (2002)
