= Tommy Henderson =

20th-century Northern Irish politician

Thomas Gibson Henderson (13 October 1887 – 14 August 1970) was an Independent unionist politician. He served in the House of Commons of Northern Ireland from 1925 to 1953 in vigorous opposition to the Unionist governments on all issues other than the partition of Ireland, and is famous for having at one stage spoken for nearly ten hours to outline his disagreements.

== Early life ==
Henderson was born in Belfast at 12 Dundee Street and brought up in the Shankill Road area. He was the son of iron worker John Henderson and Mary Gribbon. He was educated at Jersey Street National School and Hampden Street National School, and worked as a housepainter and decorator. He was a strong trade unionist and Orangeman.

== Political career ==
=== Early political career ===
Henderson was a member of the Irish Unionist Party and when the Unionists decided to establish the Ulster Unionist Labour Association to bolster their support with Protestant workers in 1918, he became a founder member and one of the leading personalities and very popular among the Shankill workers.

In 1920, he offered himself as a potential Unionist candidate for the House of Commons of Northern Ireland at the first election but was met by a patronising response from the Chairman of the selection meeting who looked down at him (Henderson was significantly below average height) in his ill-fitting and paint-spattered clothes and asked "What kind of a man are you?". Henderson left the meeting before the ballot, knowing he could not win and determined to show the Unionists exactly what kind of a man he was.

In 1923, Henderson was elected as an independent Unionist to Belfast City Council. He was to retain the seat until his death. At the 1925 election, he fought the Belfast North constituency and topped the poll with 10,306 first preference votes, the only candidate to have the electoral quota on the first count. From the 1929 election he was elected as member for Belfast Shankill.

Henderson distinguished himself at Stormont by becoming almost a one-man opposition to the Unionist government. He loudly spoke up on behalf of the working-class and criticised the government for defending the interests of the rich landowners. He was insistent that he was four-square behind them on the issue of the border and just as opposed to any land concessions to the Irish Free State. This did not prevent the Unionists using the fact that Henderson often voted with the Irish Nationalist members to imply that he agreed with them.

=== Appropriation Bill speech ===
The high point of Henderson's Parliamentary career came on 26 May 1936 when he decided to speak on the annual Appropriation Bill, a government measure which applied spending to each department and service. Henderson began speaking in the early afternoon, and after a short interruption for an opposition debate, resumed speaking in the evening. He went through each department listing the policies he disagreed with and attacking government policy, being sustained by glasses of water handed to him by the Northern Ireland Labour Party member in the next seat. By the time he sat down at 3:55 AM on 27 May, he had spoken for almost ten hours. The other members of the House had to stay to the end because the Bill was against its deadline to be passed. This was at that point the longest speech in any British Empire legislature.

=== During the Second World War ===
Henderson was a vocal critic of the Northern Ireland government's failure to put in place effective air raid precautions during the Second World War, which led to severe loss of life when Belfast was bombed on the night of 15 April 1941 (although he excluded the Minister of Public Security, John MacDermott from the criticism despite his technical responsibility). In an unconnected incident, he told of an occasion when the Marquess of Londonderry had invited him to a private room in the Grand Central Hotel in Belfast to discuss Germany. The Marquess, who was a leading Unionist who had held office in the United Kingdom government, was suspected of having pro-German sympathies.

=== Post-war ===
With Henderson's local support so high, the Unionists did not oppose him in the 1945 election. Likewise, he was left alone in 1949 when the issue of partition was made a total priority. However Henderson, despite his long years of experience, had now become less effective. At the 1953 election both the Northern Ireland Labour Party and the Unionists challenged him and he was defeated.

Henderson retained his seat on Belfast City Council (of which he had been High Sheriff in 1943). Reward for his dedication came with the award of Freeman of the City of Belfast from 1964.

== See also ==
- Filibuster
- History of Northern Ireland
- Parliament of Northern Ireland

Parliament of Northern Ireland
Preceded by Lloyd Campbell; Samuel McGuffin; William Grant; Robert McKeown	Member of Parliament for Belfast North; 1925–1929; With: Lloyd Campbell; William Grant; Sam Kyle	Constituency abolished
New constituency	Member of Parliament for Belfast Shankill; 1929–1953	Succeeded by Henry Holmes
Civic offices
Preceded by Percival Brown	High Sheriff of Belfast; 1942–1943	Succeeded by Frederick William Kennedy
