= Council of Ireland =

Former all-Ireland statutory body (1921-1925)

The Council of Ireland was a statutory body established under the Government of Ireland Act 1920 as an all-Ireland law-making authority with limited jurisdiction, initially over both Northern Ireland and Southern Ireland, and later solely over Northern Ireland. It had 41 members: 13 members of each of the Houses of Commons of Southern Ireland and of Northern Ireland; 7 members of each of the Senates of Southern Ireland and of Northern Ireland; and a President chosen by the Lord-Lieutenant of Ireland. It never met and was abolished in 1925.

== Purpose ==
Under Section 2 of the 1920 act, the council was established with the following purpose:

With a view to the eventual establishment of a Parliament for the whole of Ireland, and to bringing about harmonious action between the parliaments and governments of Southern Ireland and Northern Ireland, and to the promotion of mutual intercourse and uniformity in relation to matters affecting the whole of Ireland, and to providing for the administration of services which the two parliaments mutually agree should be administered uniformly throughout the whole of Ireland, or which by virtue of this Act are to be so administered, there shall be constituted, as soon as may be after the appointed day, a Council to be called the Council of Ireland.

Under Section 7 of the 1920 act, the council could make orders concerning matters which were within the remit of the respective parliaments of Southern and Northern Ireland. The council's orders required royal assent in the same way bills of either of the parliaments also required such assent.

== Establishment ==
The Council was duly established on the "Appointed Day", 3 May 1921. On 23 June 1921, the House of Commons of Northern Ireland duly elected its 13 chosen members to the Council:

- Robert Anderson
- J. M. Andrews
- Milne Barbour
- Dawson Bates
- William Coote
- James Craig
- Herbert Dixon
- William Grant
- Robert Johnstone
- Crawford McCullagh
- Samuel McGuffin
- Robert McKeown
- David Shillington

The House of Commons of Southern Ireland was a body which although established, never functioned and never elected members to the Council; most of its members instead sat in the republican Second Dáil. In fact, the Council of Ireland never met.

== Adaptation of Council under Treaty ==
The Anglo-Irish Treaty made provision for the continuation of the Council of Ireland after the Irish Free State was established. Under the Treaty, if Northern Ireland chose to opt out of the Irish Free State (as in fact it subsequently did), the Council was to continue but the Council's powers could then only be applied to Northern Ireland and not to the Irish Free State. While its functions only applied to Northern Ireland, its membership continued to be 40: 20 selected by each of the Parliaments of the Irish Free State and Northern Ireland respectively and one by the King's representative. Therefore, after the Treaty, it was no longer the all-Ireland body originally envisaged as its powers applied only to Northern Ireland. Instead, it was a body in which the Irish Free State might influence the affairs of Northern Ireland and consequently was increasingly distrusted by the Government of Northern Ireland. The Council never met.

On 23 January 1922 Michael Collins, then head of the Provisional Government in Dublin, met Sir James Craig, then Prime Minister of Northern Ireland, in London, and they agreed amongst other matters that: "The two Governments [are] to endeavour to devise a more suitable system than the Council of Ireland for dealing with problems affecting all Ireland."

== Abolition ==
After the collapse of the Irish Boundary Commission in 1925, the 1921 Treaty was amended 3 December 1925 by agreement between United Kingdom, Northern Ireland and Irish Free State governments. The Council of Ireland was essentially abolished, as it was transferred to the care of the Northern Ireland government that did not intend to work towards a united Ireland in the foreseeable future. Under Article 5 of that Agreement it was declared that:

The powers in relation to Northern Ireland which by the Government of Ireland Act, 1920, are made powers of the Council of Ireland shall be and are hereby transferred to and shall become powers of the Parliament and the Government of Northern Ireland

== See also ==
- 1973 Sunningdale Agreement, included a "Council of Ireland"
- North/South Inter-Parliamentary Association and North/South Ministerial Council, under the 1998 Good Friday Agreement
