= 1918 United Kingdom general election =

- 14 December 1918

All 707 seats in the House of Commons 354 (Note: Given that Sinn Féin MPs practised abstentionism and did not take their seats, while the Speaker and deputies did not vote, the number of MPs needed for a majority was lower in practice. Sinn Féin won 73 seats, meaning a practical majority required 318 MPs.) seats needed for a majority
- Registered: 21,392,322
- Turnout: 10,786,818; 57.2% (▼24.4 pp)
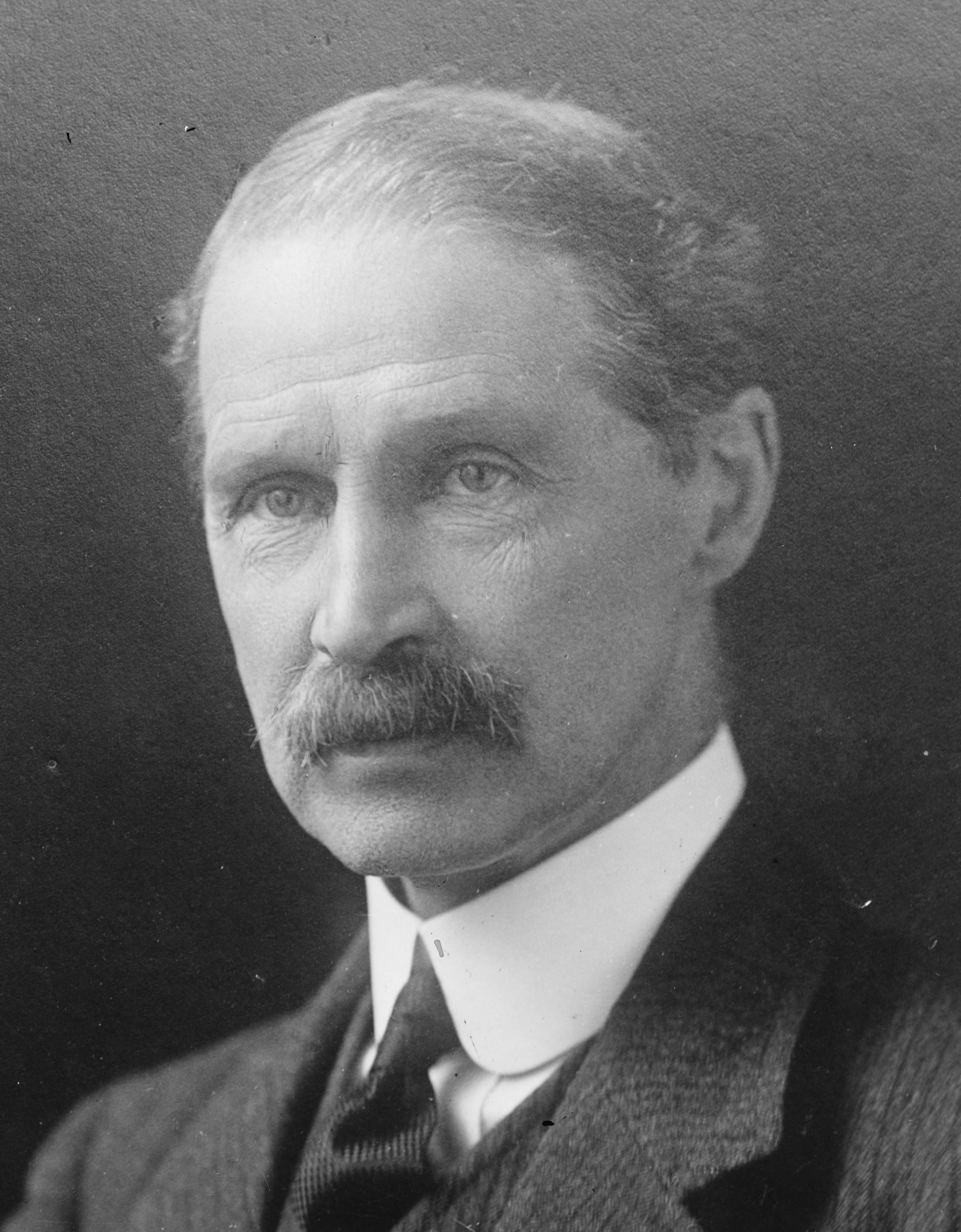

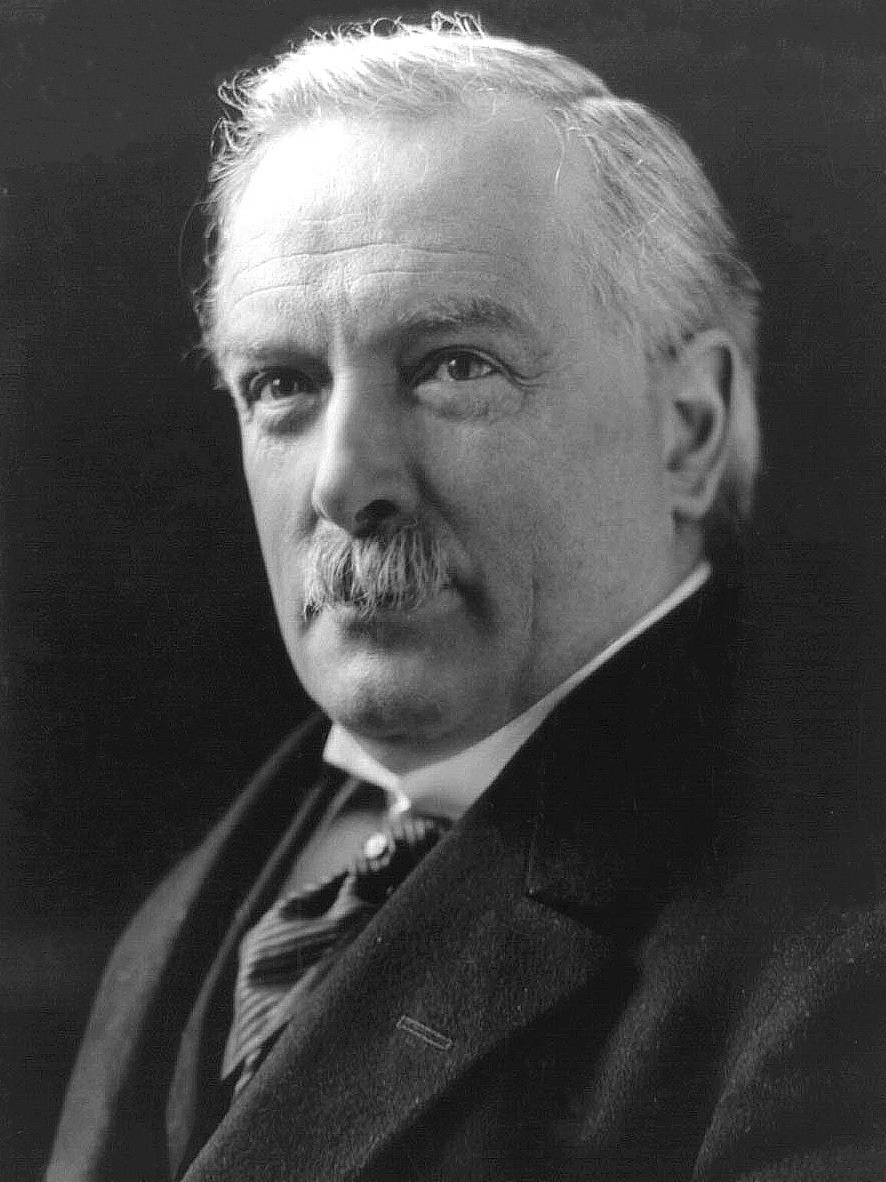

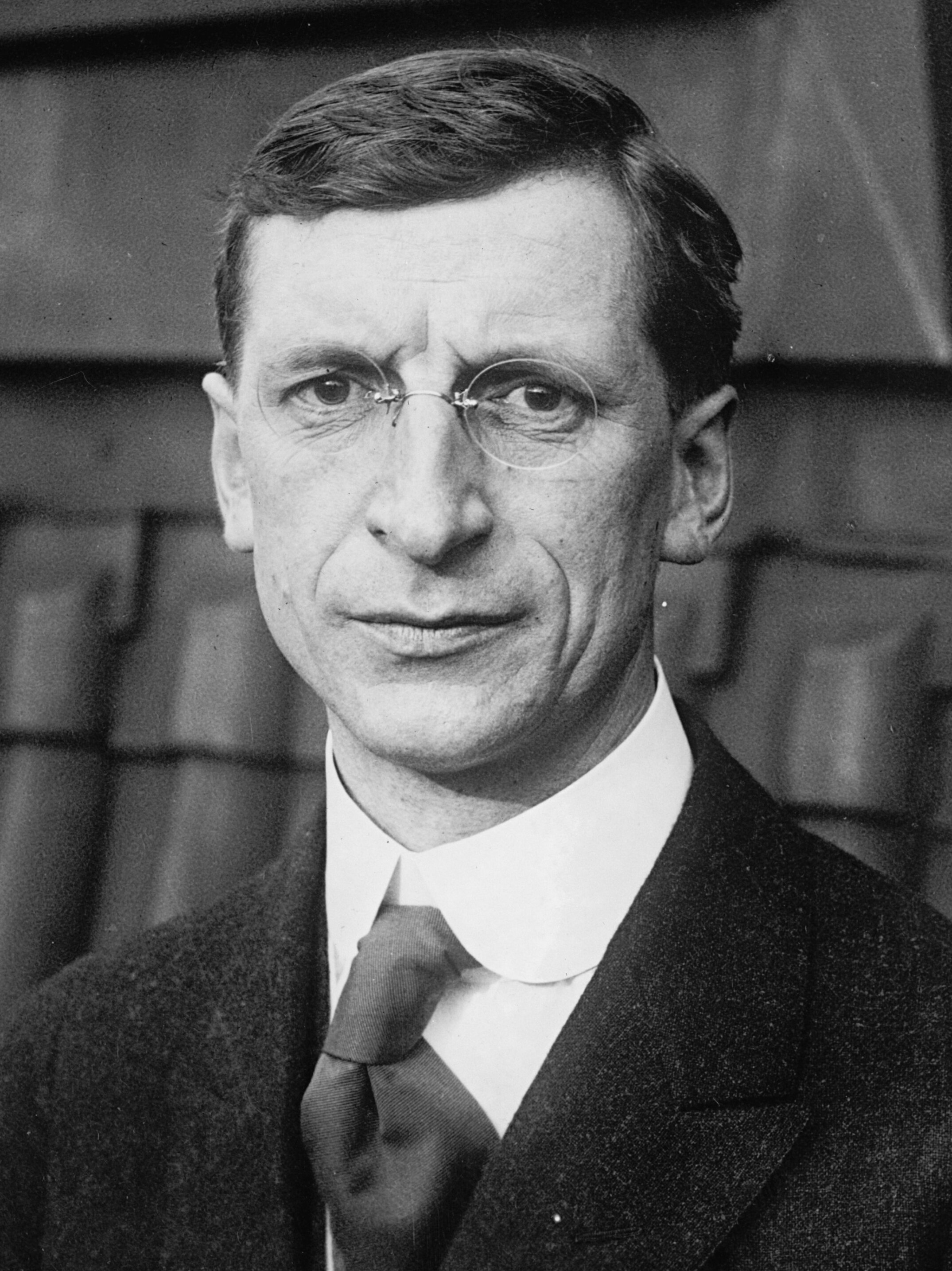

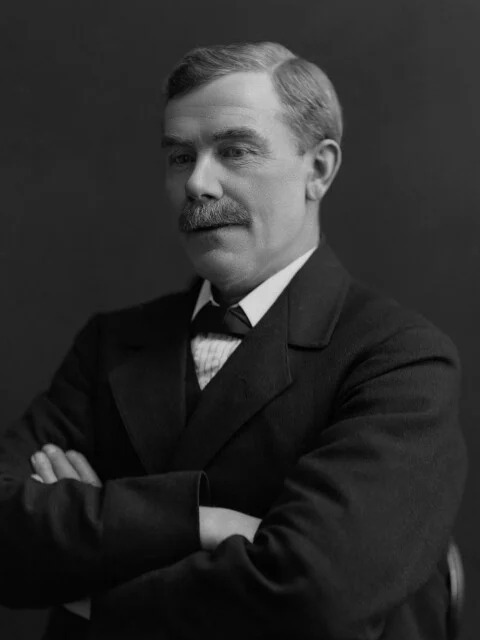

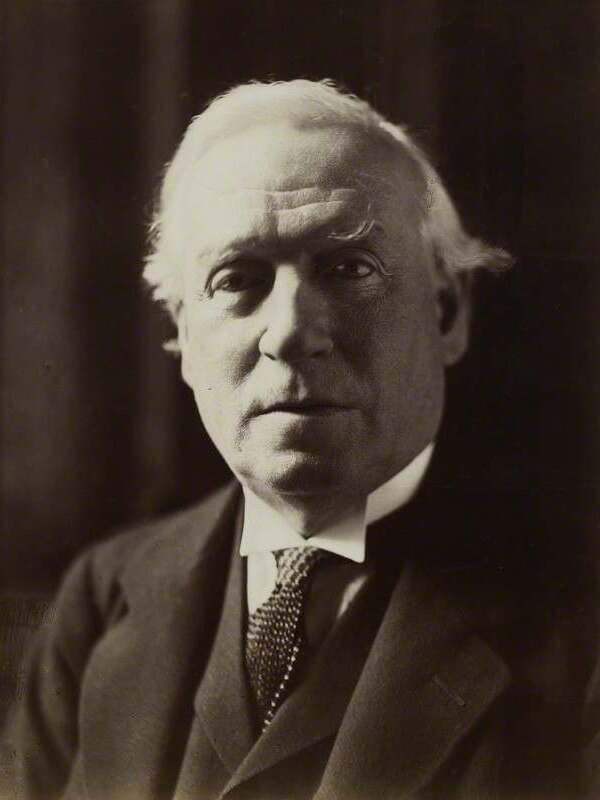

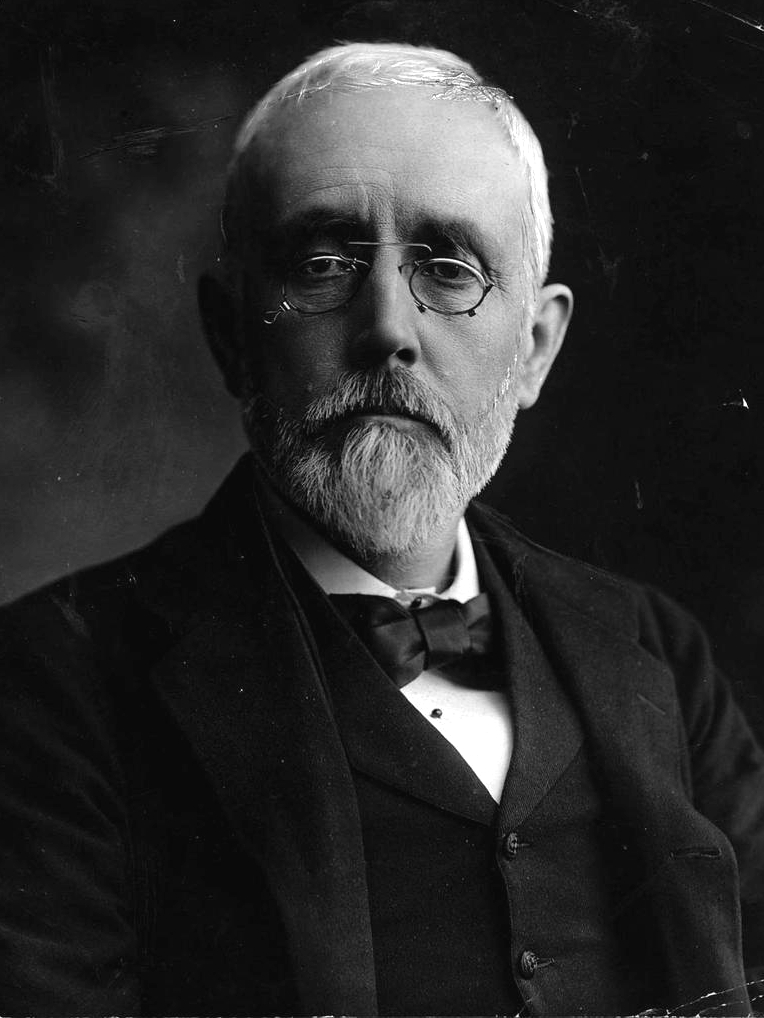
	First party	Second party	Third party
Leader	Bonar Law	David Lloyd George	Éamon de Valera
Party	Conservative	Coalition Liberal	Sinn Féin
Alliance	Coalition	Coalition
Leader since	13 November 1911	7 December 1916	25 October 1917
Leader's seat	Glasgow Central	Caernarvon; Boroughs	East Clare; East Mayo (Note: De Valera was elected in both seats.)
Last election	272 seats, 46.6% (Note: Combined results of the Conservative and Liberal Unionist Party in December 1910, which had since merged to the form the Conservative and Unionist party in 1912.)	Did not contest	Did not contest
Seats won	382 (Note: Including Conservatives and Unionists not elected under the Coalition Coupon.) (Note: Figure includes Speaker of the House of Commons James Lowther in Penrith and Cockermouth. He received a Coalition Coupon in this election.)	127	73 (Note: The Sinn Féin MPs did not take their seats in the House of Commons, and instead formed Dáil Éireann.)
Seat change	▲110	▲127	▲73
Popular vote	4,144,192	1,396,590	497,107
Percentage	38.7%	12.6%	4.6%
Swing	▼7.9 pp	New party	New party
	Fourth party	Fifth party	Sixth party
Leader	William Adamson	H. H. Asquith	John Dillon
Party	Labour	Liberal	Irish Parliamentary
Leader since	24 October 1917	30 April 1908	6 March 1918
Leader's seat	West Fife	East Fife (lost seat)	East Mayo (lost seat)
Last election	42 seats, 6.4%	271 seats, 44.2%	74 seats, 2.5%
Seats won	57	36	7
Seat change	▲15	▼235	▼67
Popular vote	2,245,777	1,388,784	238,197
Percentage	20.8%	13.0%	2.2%
Swing	▲14.4 pp	▼31.2 pp	▼0.3 pp
- Colours denote the winning party

- Composition of the House of Commons after the 1918 general election
Prime Minister before election
David Lloyd George
National Liberal
Prime Minister after election
David Lloyd George
National Liberal

Following the Armistice with Germany, which ended the First World War, a general election was held in the United Kingdom on Saturday, 14 December 1918. The governing coalition, under Prime Minister David Lloyd George, sent letters of endorsement to candidates who supported the coalition government. These were nicknamed Coalition Coupons, and led to the election being known as the "coupon election". The result was a massive landslide in favour of the coalition, comprising primarily the Conservatives and Coalition Liberals, with massive losses for Liberals who were not endorsed. Nearly all the Liberal MPs without coupons were defeated, including party leader and former Prime Minister H. H. Asquith.

It was the first general election to be held after enactment of the Representation of the People Act 1918. It was thus the first election in which women over the age of 30 (with some property qualifications), and all men over the age of 21, could vote. Previously, all women and many poor men had been excluded from voting. Women generally supported the coalition candidates.

It was also the first parliamentary election in which women were able to stand as candidates, following the Parliament (Qualification of Women) Act 1918, which received royal assent shortly before Parliament was dissolved. At 27 operative words, it is believed to be one of the shortest Acts of Parliament. It followed a report by Law Officers that the Reform Act 1832 had specified parliamentary candidates had to be male, and that the Representation of the People Act passed earlier in the year did not change that. One woman, Nina Boyle, had presented herself as a candidate in the 1918 Keighley by-election, but had been turned down by the returning officer on technical grounds.

It was also the first general election to include on a single day all eligible voters of the United Kingdom, although the vote count was delayed until 28 December so that the ballots cast by soldiers serving overseas could be included in the tallies. Prior to this election the university constituency seats were re-allocated. Several seats were filled in multi-seat constituencies using STV.

The election resulted in a landslide victory for the coalition government of David Lloyd George, who had replaced H. H. Asquith as Prime Minister in December 1916. They were both Liberals, and continued to battle for control of the party, which was rapidly losing popular support, and never regained power.

The election was also noted for the dramatic result in Ireland, which showed clear disapproval of government policy. The Irish Parliamentary Party were almost completely wiped out by the Irish republican party Sinn Féin, who vowed in their manifesto to establish an independent Irish Republic. They refused to take their seats in Westminster, instead forming Dáil Éireann as a separatist parliament and made a Declaration of Independence in 1919. The Irish War of Independence also began in January 1919. Because of the resulting partition of Ireland, this was the last United Kingdom general election to include the entire island of Ireland.

== Background ==
Lloyd George's coalition government was supported by a minority (majority after the election) of the Liberals and Bonar Law's Conservatives. However, the election saw a split in the Liberal Party between those who were aligned with Lloyd George and the government and those who were aligned with Asquith, the party's official leader.

On 5 November, with a Western Front armistice imminent, Lloyd George asked King George V for a dissolution of Parliament. The King was initially reluctant because of the large number of newly enfranchised voters, both male (many of them in the Army) and female. He was persuaded, on the grounds that Parliament had been sitting since 1910 and had been extended since the end of 1915 by emergency wartime legislation. (Note: Under the 1911 Parliament Act (see that article) a vote by the Commons to extend its own life is one of the exceptional cases over which the House of Lords retains a veto. The Conservative Peers could therefore have forced an election by blocking any further extension. Jane Ridley makes no mention of Lloyd George raising this point.) On 14 November it was announced that Parliament would dissolve on 25 November, with elections on 14 December.

Following confidential negotiations over the summer of 1918, it was agreed that certain candidates were to be offered the support of the Prime Minister and the leader of the Conservative Party at the next general election. To these candidates a letter, known as the Coalition Coupon, was sent, indicating the government's endorsement of their candidacy. 159 Liberal, 364 Conservative, 20 National Democratic and Labour, and 2 Coalition Labour candidates received the coupon. For this reason, the election is often called the Coupon Election.

80 Conservative candidates stood without a coupon. Of these, 35 candidates were Irish Unionists. Of the other non-couponed Conservative candidates, only 23 stood against a Coalition candidate; the remaining 22 candidates stood in areas where there were no coupons, or refused the offer of a coupon.

The Labour Party, led by William Adamson, fought the election independently, as did those Liberals who did not receive a coupon.

The election was not chiefly fought over what peace to make with Germany, although those issues played a role. More important was the voters' evaluation of Lloyd George in terms of what he had accomplished so far and what he promised for the future. His supporters emphasised that he had won the Great War. Against his strong record in social legislation, he called for making "a country fit for heroes to live in".

This election was also known as a khaki election, due to the immediate postwar setting and the role of the demobilised soldiers.

== Coalition victory ==
The coalition won the election easily, with the Conservatives the big winners. They were the largest party in the governing majority. Lloyd George remained Prime Minister, despite the Conservatives outnumbering his pro-coalition Liberals and having a majority in their own right. The Conservatives welcomed his leadership on foreign policy as the Paris Peace talks began a few weeks after the election.

An additional 47 Conservatives, 23 of whom were Irish Unionists (22 Irish Unionist Alliance MPs and 1 Independent Unionist MP), won without the coupon but did not act as a separate block or oppose the government except on the issue of Irish independence.

While most of the pro-coalition Liberals were re-elected, the Independent Liberal faction was reduced to a handful of MPs, not all of whom were opponents of the coalition. Asquith and the other leaders lost their seats, and only three with junior ministerial experience were elected. According to Trevor Wilson's book, The Downfall of the Liberal Party, 136 couponed Liberals were elected, whereas only 29 who did not receive the coupon were returned to Parliament, but as 8 Independent Liberals received the coupon and 10 Lloyd George Liberals did not, the actual number of the Asquith faction was 27. Another historian puts the Asquith faction at 36 seats, of whom nine of these MPs subsequently joined the Coalition Liberal group. The remainder became bitter enemies of Lloyd George. Asquith's biographer Stephen Koss accepts that, although accounts differ as to the exact numbers, around 29 uncouponed Liberals had been elected. On 3 February 1919, 23 non-coalition Liberals formed themselves into a "Free Liberal" group (soon known as the "Wee Frees" after a Scottish religious sect of that name); they accepted Asquith's appointment of Sir Donald Maclean as chairman in his absence. After a brief attempt to set up a joint committee with the Coalition Liberal MPs, the "Wee Frees" resigned the government whip on 4 April, although some Liberal MPs still remained of uncertain allegiance. Maclean served as Leader of the Opposition until Asquith returned at a by-election in February 1920.

The Labour Party greatly increased its vote share and surpassed the total votes of either faction of the Liberal party, but they lacked an official leader. Labour could only slightly increase their number of seats, however, from 42 to 57 and some of their earlier leaders including Ramsay MacDonald and Arthur Henderson lost their seats.

The Conservative MPs included record numbers of corporate directors, bankers and businessmen, while Labour MPs were mostly from the working class. Bonar Law himself symbolised the change in the type of a Conservative MP as he was a Presbyterian Canadian-born Scottish businessman who became, in the words of his biographer Robert Blake, the leader of "the Party of Old England, the Party of the Anglican Church and the country squire, the party of broad acres and hereditary titles". Bonar Law's ascent as leader of the Conservatives marked a shift in Conservative leaders from the aristocrats who generally led the party in the 19th century to a more middle class leadership who usually led the party in the 20th century.

Many young veterans reacted against the harsh tone of the campaign and became disillusioned with politics.

== Ireland ==
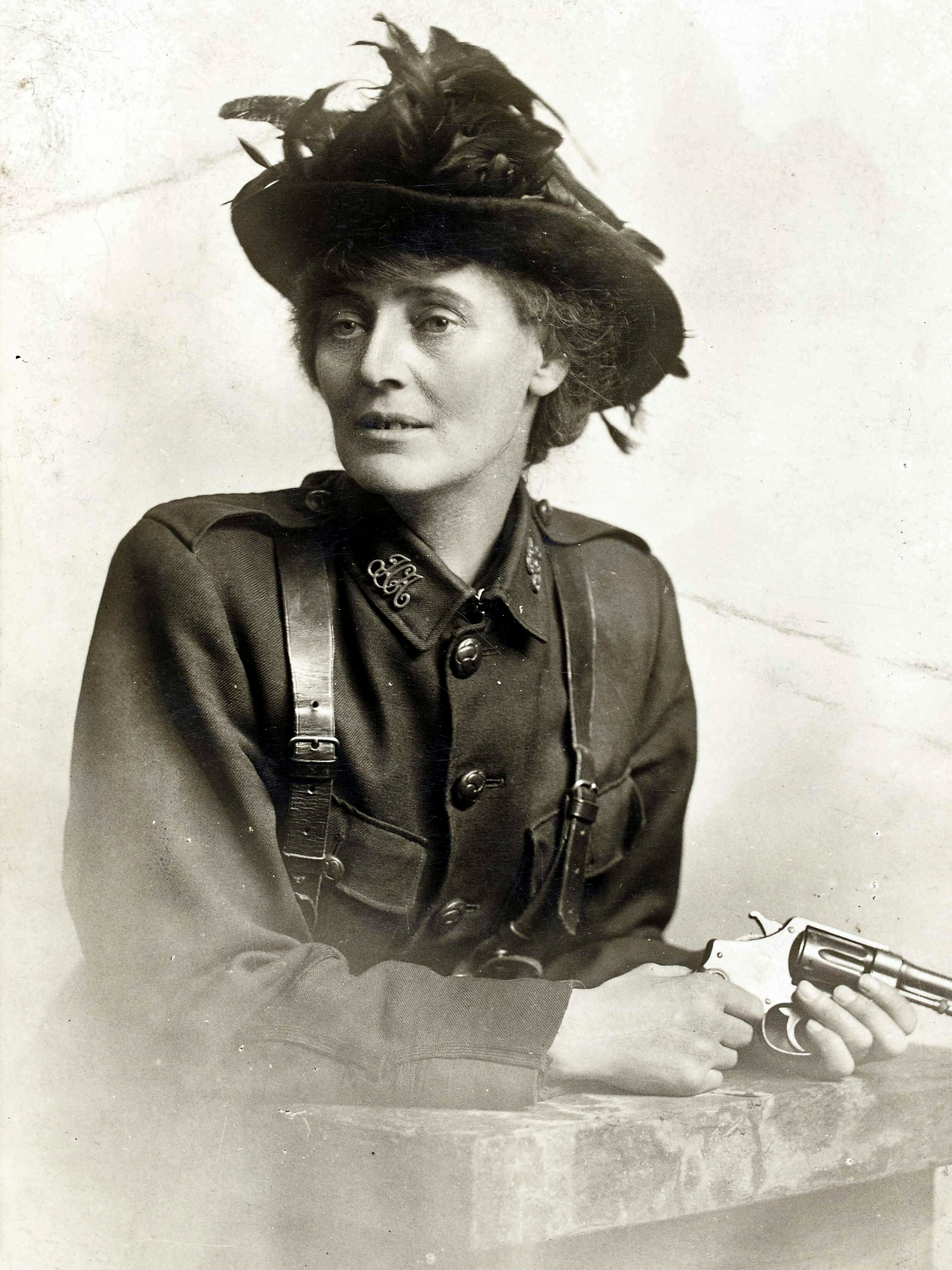
Constance Markievicz was the first woman elected to the House of Commons and also to the Dáil Éireann, but as an Irish nationalist she did not take her seat at Westminster.

In Ireland, the Irish Parliamentary Party, which favoured Home Rule within the United Kingdom, lost almost all their seats, most of which were won by Sinn Féin under Éamon de Valera, which called for independence. The executions of many of the leaders of the Easter uprising of 1916, the force-feeding of those imprisoned in connection with the uprising who had gone on a hunger strike in 1917, and the Conscription Crisis of 1918 all served to alienate Irish Catholic opinion from the United Kingdom. The Sinn Féin candidates had promised on the campaign trail to win an Irish republic "by any means necessary", which was a code-word for violence, though it is not entirely clear if all Irish voters understood what the phrase meant. The 73 Sinn Féin elected members declined to take their seats in the British House of Commons, sitting instead in the Irish revolutionary assembly, the Dáil Éireann. On 17 May 1918 almost the entire leadership of Sinn Féin, including de Valera and Arthur Griffith, had been arrested. In total 47 of the Sinn Féin MPs were elected from jail. The Dáil first convened on 21 January 1919, which marks the beginning of the Irish War of Independence.

In the six Ulster counties that became Northern Ireland, Unionists consolidated their position by winning 23 out of the 30 seats. Cardinal Michael Logue brokered a pact in eight seats (one, East Donegal, not in the six counties), after nominations closed, where Catholic voters were instructed to vote for one particular nationalist party. Split evenly, the Irish Parliamentary Party won four of those seats and Sinn Féin three. (The pact failed in East Down). Joseph Devlin, memorably, also won Belfast (Falls) for the Irish Parliamentary Party in a straight fight with Éamon de Valera of Sinn Féin.

Constance Markievicz became the first woman elected to Parliament and also to the Dáil Éireann. She was a Sinn Féin member elected for Dublin St Patrick's, and like the other Sinn Féin MPs, did not take her seat at Westminster.

== Women candidates ==
The seventeen women candidates were:

- Margery Corbett Ashby, aged 36, Liberal, Birmingham, Ladywood
- Winnifred Carney, aged 31, Sinn Féin, Belfast, Victoria
- Charlotte Despard, aged 74, Labour, Battersea, North
- Norah Dacre Fox, aged 40, Independent, Richmond
- Alison Vickers Garland, aged 56, Liberal, Portsmouth South
- Emmeline Pethick-Lawrence, aged 51, Labour, Manchester, Rusholme
- Alice Lucas, aged 65, Conservative, Lambeth, Kennington
- Mary Macarthur (Mrs W. C. Anderson), aged 38, Labour, Stourbridge, Worcestershire
- Violet Markham (Mrs Carruthers), aged 46, Independent Liberal, Mansfield, Nottinghamshire
- Edith How Martyn, aged 43, Independent Progressive, Hendon, Middlesex
- Janet McEwan, aged 58, Liberal, Enfield, Middlesex
- Millicent Mackenzie, 55, Labour, University of Wales
- Constance Markievicz, aged 50, Sinn Féin, Dublin, St. Patrick's (elected)
- Eunice Murray, aged 41, Independent, Glasgow, Bridgetown
- Christabel Pankhurst, aged 38, Women's Party, Smethwick
- Emily Phipps, aged 53, Independent Progressive, Chelsea
- Ray Strachey, aged 31, Independent, Brentford and Isleworth, Middlesex

== Results ==
=== Summary of seats returned ===
Party	Leader	MPs		Aggregate votes	
Party	Leader		Of total		Of total (Note: Adjusted for multi-member constituencies.)
Conservative and Unionist Party	Bonar Law	382 (Note: Includes a total of 50 non-Coalition Conservative and Unionist MPs.)	54.0%	4,144,192 (Note: Includes a total of 671,454 for non-Coalition Conservatives and Unionists.)	38.7%
Conservative Party (Note: Results for England and Wales.)	Bonar Law	325 (Note: Includes 23 non-Coalition Conservative MPs.)	46.0%	3,486,114 (Note: Includes 356,911 for non-Coalition Conservatives.)	32.6%
Unionist Party	George Younger	32 (Note: Includes 2 non-Coalition Unionist MPs.)	4.5%	365,474 (Note: Includes 21,939 for non-Coalition Unionists.)	3.4%
Irish Unionist Party	Edward Carson	22 (Note: There were no recipients of Coalition Coupons.)	3.1%	262,300 (Note: There were no recipients of Coalition Coupons.)	2.4%
Ulster Unionist Labour Association (Note: Adjunctive party to the Irish Unionist Party, set up by Leader of the Irish Unionist Party Edward Carson.)	Thompson Donald (Note: Donald was the Honorary Secretary of the group, though it was organised by Edward Carson.)	3 (Note: There were no recipients of Coalition Coupons.) (Note: Those elected were Samuel McGuffin in Belfast Shankill, Thomas Henry Burn in Belfast St Anne's and Thompson Donald in Belfast Victoria.)	0.4%	30,304 (Note: There were no recipients of Coalition Coupons.)	0.3%
Coalition Liberal	David Lloyd George	127	18.0%	1,396,590	12.6%
Sinn Féin	Éamon de Valera	73 (Note: Sinn Féin won 73 constituencies in Ireland, however, this only represented 69 MPs, due to four candidates winning two seats each. The party's MPs did not take their seats at Westminster.)	10.3%	497,107	4.6%
Labour Party	William Adamson	57	8.1%	2,245,777	20.8%
Liberal Party	H. H. Asquith	36	5.1%	1,388,784	13.0%
Coalition NDP	—N/a	9	1.3%	156,834	1.5%
Irish Parliamentary Party	John Dillon	7 (Note: Includes T. P. O'Connor in Liverpool Scotland.)	1.0%	238,197 (Note: Includes 8,225 for 2 Irish Nationalists in Liverpool Scotland and Liverpool Exchange.)	2.2%
Coalition Labour	—N/a	4	0.6%	53,962	0.4%
Independent Labour	—N/a	2	0.3%	101,362	0.9%
National Party	Henry Page Croft	2	0.3%	94,389	0.9%
Independent	—N/a	2	0.3%	66,971	0.6%
Independent Unionist	—N/a	2 (Note: Robert Hewitt Barker in Sowerby was also unofficially endorsed by the National Association of Discharged Sailors and Soldiers.)	0.3%	49,500	0.5%
Co-operative Party	William Henry Watkins	1	0.1%	57,785	0.6%
Independent Liberal	—N/a	1	0.1%	24,985	0.2%
National Socialist Party	Henry Hyndman	1	0.1%	11,013	0.1%
Coalition Independent	—N/a	1	0.1%	9,274	0.1%

=== Full results ===

Results of the December 1918 general election to the House of Commons of the United Kingdom
Party	Leader	Candidates	MPs					Aggregate votes		
Party	Leader	Candidates	Total	Gains	Losses	Net	Of total (%)	Total	Of total (%) (Note: Adjusted for multi-member constituencies.)	Change (%)
Coalition Government (Total)	David Lloyd; George	614	523	New		▲251	74.0	5,760,852	53.3	New
Conservative (Note: Figure includes the Unionist Party and the Irish Unionist Party under their nation affiliations with the Conservative Party; figure also includes the Ulster Unionist Labour Association, which was an adjunctive party to the Irish Unionist Party.)	Bonar; Law	445 (Note: Includes 83 non-Coalition Conservative and Unionist candidates.)	382 (Note: Includes 50 non-Coalition Conservative and Unionist MPs.)	—N/a		▲110	54.0 (Note: Includes 7.1% for non-Coalition Conservatives and Unionists.)	4,144,192 (Note: Includes 671,454 for non-Coalition Conservatives and Unionists.)	38.7 (Note: Includes 6.2% for non-Coalition Conservatives and Unionists.)	▼7.9
Coalition; Liberal	David Lloyd; George	145	127	New		▲127	18.0	1,396,590	12.6	New
Coalition; NDP	—N/a	18	9	New		▲9	1.3	156,834	1.5	New
Coalition; Labour	—N/a	5	4	New		▲4	0.6	53,962	0.4	New
Coalition; Independent	—N/a	1	1 (Note: Douglas King in North Norfolk.)	New		▲1	0.2	9,274	0.1	New
Labour	William; Adamson	361	57	—N/a		▲15	8.1	2,245,777	20.8	▲14.4
Liberal	H. H. Asquith	276	36	—N/a		▼235	5.2	1,388,784	13.0	▼31.2
Sinn; Féin	Éamon de Valera	102	73	New		▲73	10.3	497,107	4.6	New
Irish; Parliamentary	John; Dillon	60 (Note: 2 Irish Nationalists in Liverpool Scotland and Liverpool Exchange.)	7 (Note: Includes T. P. O'Connor in Liverpool Scotland.)	0	67	▼67	1.0	238,197 (Note: Includes 8,225 for 2 Irish Nationalists in Liverpool Scotland and Liverpool Exchange.)	2.2	▼0.3
Independent; Labour	—N/a	24	2 (Note: Frank Rose in Aberdeen North and Owen Thomas in Anglesey.)	2	0	▲2	—	102,021	1.0	▲0.9
National	Henry Page; Croft	26	2 (Note: Henry Page Croft in Bournemouth and Sir Richard Cooper in Walsall.)	New		▲2	0.4	94,389	0.9	New
Independent	—N/a	28	2 (Note: Horatio Bottomley in Hackney South and Noel Pemberton Billing in Hertford.)	2	0	▲2	0.4	66,971	0.6	▲0.6
Co-operative; Party	William Henry Watkins	10	1 (Note: Alfred Waterson in Kettering.)	New		▲1	0.1	57,785	0.6	New
Independent; NFDDSS	James; Hogge	25	0	New			—	55,219	0.5	New
Independent; Unionist	—N/a	17	2 (Note: Robert Woods in Dublin University and Robert Hewitt Barker in Sowerby. Barker was also unofficially endorsed by the National Association of Discharged Sailors and Soldiers.)	2	0	▲2	0.3	49,500	0.5	▲0.5
Independent; Liberal	—N/a	9	1 (Note: Josiah Wedgwood in Newcastle-under-Lyme.)	1	0	▲1	0.2	24,985	0.2	▲0.2
National Democratic and Labour	—N/a	8	0	New			—	24,497	0.2	New
Farmers'; Union	Edward Mials Nunneley	5	0	New			—	15,966	0.2	New
NFDDSS	James; Hogge	5	0	New			—	12,329	0.1	New
Belfast; Labour	—N/a	4	0	New			—	12,164	0.1	New
National; Socialist	Henry; Hyndman	3	1 (Note: Jack Jones in Silvertown.)	New		▲1	0.2	11,013	0.1	New
Scottish; Prohibition	Edwin; Scrymgeour	1	0	0	0	Steady	—	10,423	0.1	▲0.1
Independent Progressive (Coalition)	—N/a	1	0	New			—	9,862	0.1	New
Highland; Land League	—N/a	4	0	New			—	8,710	0.1	New
Women's; Party	Christabel; Pankhurst	1	0	New			—	8,614	0.1	New
British; Socialist	Albert; Inkpin	3	0	New			—	8,394	0.1	New
Independent; Democrat	—N/a	4	0	New			—	8,351	0.1	New
Socialist; Labour	Tom; Bell	3	0	New			—	7,567	0.1	New
Seaman's; Union	Havelock; Wilson	1 (Note: There were 2 other candidates, including Havelock Wilson, who were sponsored by the Seaman's Union; however, stood under other party labels.)	0	New			—	7,235	0.1	New
Naval and Lower-Deck	—N/a	1	0	New			—	7,063	0.1	New
Independent; Conservative	—N/a	2	0	0	1 (Note: Francis Bennett-Goldney in Canterbury.)	▼1	—	6,425	0.1	▲0.1
National Amalgamated Union	Joseph Nicholas Bell	1	0	New			—	5,959	0.1	New
Miners' Reform Union	James; Cook	1	0	New			—	5,076	0.0	New
Independent; Northumbrian	—N/a	1	0	New			—	4,397	0.0	New
Independent; Nationalist	—N/a	3 (Note: 3 other candidates stood as Irish Nationalist. They (those candidates in Dublin St James's, South Tyrone and Dublin University) are sometimes labelled as Independent Nationalists; however, they are classed as candidates for the Irish Parliamentary Party under the collations of Craig and Thrasher, as well as the Parliamentary tables which use those historical studies. Those 3 candidates are classed as part of the IPP for the purposes of this table, with 3 candidates here being Independent Nationalists.)	0	0	2 (Note: Laurence Ginnell in North Westmeath re-elected but as candidate for Sinn Féin; John McKean in South Monaghan did not recontest.)	▼2	—	3,768	0.0	Steady
Agriculturalist	—N/a	2	0	New			—	3,446	0.0	New
Independent; Progressive	—N/a	2	0	New			—	3,010	0.0	New
Harrow; Elector's	—N/a	1	0	New			—	3,007	0.0	New
Carters' and Motormen's	Alfred; Hilton	1	0	New			—	2,572	0.0	New
National Amalgamated Coal Workers'	Alfred; Walton	1	0	New			—	2,072	0.0	New
Women's; Parliamentary	—N/a	1	0	New			—	2,067	0.0	New
Greenock and District Dockers	—N/a	1	0	New			—	2,050	0.0	New
Independent Labour and Agriculturalist	—N/a	1	0	New			—	1,927	0.0	New
People's; Progressive	—N/a	1	0	New			—	1,367	0.0	New
Health	—N/a	1	0	New			—	1,127	0.0	New
Edmonton Pro-Ally & Labour	—N/a	1	0	New			—	1,223	0.0	New
Independent; Business	—N/a	2	0	New			—	1,002	0.0	New
Teachers	—N/a	1	0	New			—	885	0.0	New
Whitechaple Street Sellers' and Costers'	—N/a	1	0	New			—	614	0.0	New
Christian; Socialist	—N/a	1	0	New			—	597	0.0	New
Independent; Silver Badge	—N/a	1	0	New			—	452	0.0	New
Other non-contested		0	0	—N/a		▼8 (Note: 8 All-for-Ireland League MPs.)	—	0	0.0	—N/a
Total		1,623	707			▲37	100.0	10,786,818	100.0	0.0
Registered voters, and turnout								21,392,322 (Note: Including the electorate in uncontested constituencies.)	55.7 (Note: Adjusted for multi-member constituencies.)	▼24.4

=== Popular vote ===
Popular vote
Conservative	38.7%
Labour	20.8%
Liberal	13.0%
Coalition Liberal	12.6%
Sinn Féin	4.6%
Irish Parliamentary	2.2%
Coalition NDP	1.5%
Coalition Labour	0.4%
Others	6.2%

Popular vote (coalitions)
Coalition Gov.	53.3%
Labour	20.8%
Liberal	13.0%
Sinn Féin	4.6%
Irish Parliamentary	2.2%
Others	6.1%

=== Parliament seats ===
Parliament seats
Conservative	54.0%
Coalition Liberal	18.0%
Sinn Féin	10.3%
Labour	8.1%
Liberal	5.1%
Coalition NDP	1.3%
Irish Parliamentary	1.0%
Coalition Labour	0.6%
Coalition Ind.	0.2%
Others	1.4%

Parliament seats (coalitions)
Coalition Gov.	74.0%
Sinn Féin	10.3%
Labour	8.1%
Liberal	5.1%
Irish Parliamentary	1.0%
Others	1.4%

=== Maps ===
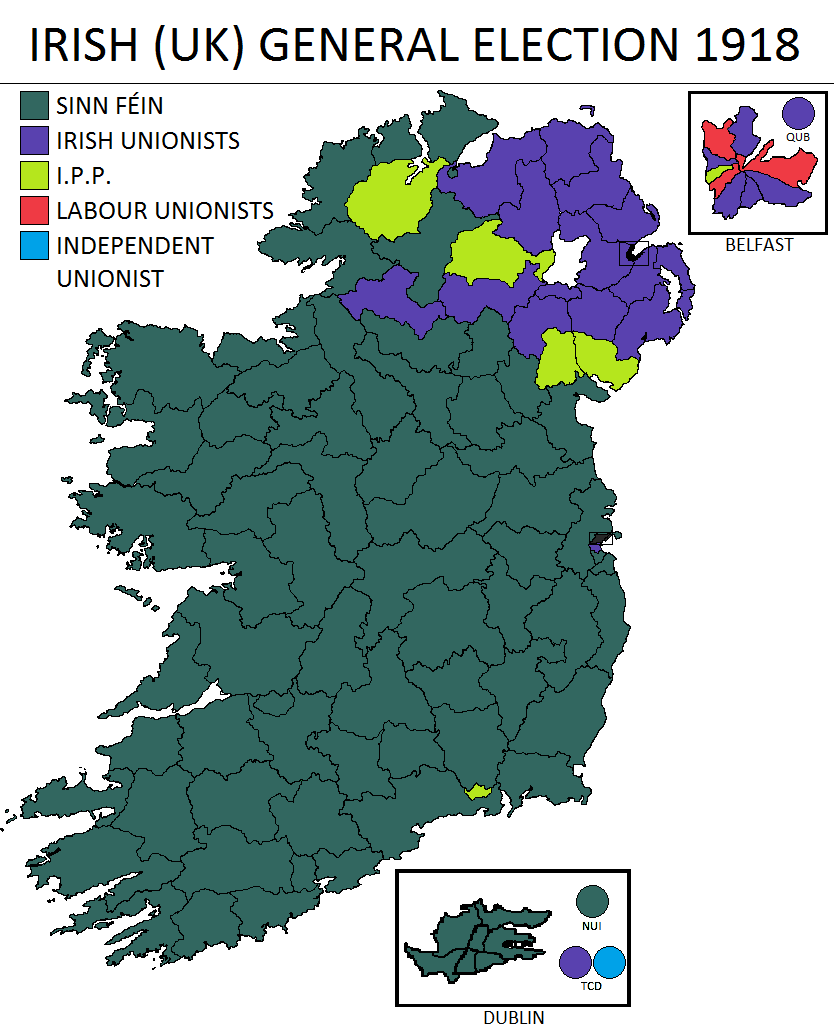
Results in Ireland. The Sinn Féin MPs did not take their seats in the House of Commons, and instead formed the Dáil Éireann (English: Assembly of Ireland).

Results in London

Results in Scotland

== Transfers of seats ==
- All comparisons are with the December 1910 election.
  - In some cases the change is due to the MP defecting to the gaining party. Such circumstances are marked with a *.
  - In other circumstances the change is due to the seat having been won by the gaining party in a by-election in the intervening years, and then retained in 1918. Such circumstances are marked with a †.

From	To	No.	Seats
Labour	Labour (HOLD)		Burslem (replaced Staffordshire North West), Deptford, Plaistow (replaced West Ham South), Woolwich East (replaced Woolwich)
Labour	Coalition Labour		Norwich (1 of 2), Stockport (1 of 2)
Labour	Coalition National Democratic		Hanley
Labour	Liberal		
Labour	National Liberal		
Labour	Conservative		Bow and Bromley†, Nuneaton
Sinn Féin	Nationalist		
Sinn Féin	abolished		
Nationalist	Nationalist		
Nationalist	abolished		
Lib-Lab	National Liberal		Battersea North (replaced Battersea)
Liberal	Labour		Forest of Dean, Leek, Wellingborough (replaced Northamptonshire Mid)
Liberal	National Democratic		Walthamstow W (replaced Walthamstow)
Liberal	Liberal (HOLD)		Bermondsey West (replaced Bermondsey), Camborne, Cornwall North (replaced Launceston), Newcastle-under-Lyme, Norwich (1 of 2), Saffron Walden, Whitechapel and St Georges (replaced Whitechapel), Wolverhampton East
Liberal	National Liberal		Banbury, Barnstaple, Bedford, Bethnal Green NE, Bristol East, Bristol North, Bristol South, Cambridgeshire (replaced Chesterton), Crewe, Dartford, Dorset East, Eye, Hackney Central, Isle of Ely (replaced Wisbech), Kennington, Lichfield, Stepney Limehouse (replaced Limehouse), Lowestoft, Luton, Norfolk South, Norfolk South West, Northampton (1 of 2), Peckham, Poplar South (replaced Poplar), Romford, St Ives, Shoreditch (replaced Hoxton), South Molton, Southampton (both seats), Southwark Central (replaced Newington West), Southwark North (replaced Southwark West), Southwark South East (replaced Walworth), Stockport (1 of 2), Stoke-upon-Trent, Stroud, Thornbury, Wellington (Salop)
Liberal	Coalition Independent		Norfolk North
Liberal	Independent		Hackney South
Liberal	Conservative		Bedfordshire Mid (replaced Biggleswade), Bethnal Green South-West†, Buckingham, Camberwell North, Cheltenham†, Coventry, Exeter†, Frome, Gillingham (replaced Rochester), Ipswich (1 of 2)†, Islington East, Islington South, Islington West, Macclesfield, Norfolk East, Northwich, Peterborough, Reading†, Rotherhithe, St Pancras North, Stafford, Swindon (replaced Cricklade), Tottenham South (replaced Tottenham), Upton (replaced West Ham North), Westbury, Yeovil (replaced Somerset Southern)†
Liberal	abolished		Finsbury East, Haggerston, Hyde, Ipswich (1 of 2), Newmarket, Norfolk North West, Northampton (1 of 2), Northamptonshire East, St Austell, St George, Tower Hamlets, St Pancras East, Stepney, Truro, Worcestershire North
Speaker	Liberal		
Liberal Unionist	Conservative		Aylesbury*, Birmingham West*, Bodmin*, Burton*, Birmingham Handsworth*, Hythe*, Ludlow*, Portsmouth North (replaced 1 of 2 Portsmouth seats)*, Stepney Mile End (replaced Mile End)*, Birmingham Sparkbrook (replaced Birmingham South)*, Stone (replaced Staffordshire West)*, Torquay*, Totnes*, Westminster St George's (replaced St George, Hanover Square)*
Liberal Unionist	abolished		Ashburton, Birmingham Central, Birmingham North, Birmingham Bordesley, Droitwich, Norfolk Mid, Ross, Somerset Eastern, Worcestershire East
Conservative	Labour		Kettering (replaced Northamptonshire North), Kingswinford, Wednesbury, West Bromwich
Conservative	Liberal		Lambeth North, Weston-super-Mare (replaced Somerset Northern)
Conservative	National Liberal		Sudbury
Conservative	Conservative (HOLD)		Abingdon, Altrincham, Ashford, Birmingham Aston (replaced Aston Manor), Basingstoke, Bath (1 of 2), Bewdley, Bilston (replaced Wolverhampton South), Birkenhead East (replaced Birkenhead), Brentford and Chiswick (replaced Brentford), Bridgwater, Brighton (both seats), Bristol West, Brixton, Bury St Edmunds, Cambridge, Chatham, Chelmsford, Chelsea, Chertsey, Chester, Chichester, Chippenham, Cirencester and Tewkesbury (replaced Tewkesbury), Clapham, Colchester, Croydon South (replaced Croydon), Daventry (replaced Northamptonshire South), Devizes, Plymouth Devonport (replaced 1 of 2 Devonport seats), Dorset North, Dorset South, Dorset West, Dover, Plymouth Drake (replaced 1 of 2 Plymouth seats), Dudley, Dulwich, Ealing, East Grinstead, Eastbourne, Eddisbury, Birmingham Edgbaston, Enfield, Epping, Epsom, Birmingham Erdington (replaced Birmingham East), Essex South East, Evesham, Fareham, Faversham, Finsbury (replaced Finsbury Central), Fulham East (replaced Fulham), Gloucester, Gravesend, Great Yarmouth, Greenwich, Guildford, Hackney North, Hammersmith South (replaced Hammersmith), Hampstead, Harrow, Harwich, Hastings, Henley, Hereford, Hitchin, Holborn, Honiton, Hornsey, Horsham and Worthing (replaced Horsham), Huntingdonshire (replaced Huntingdon), Isle of Thanet, Isle of Wight, Islington North, Kensington North, Kensington South, Kidderminster, King's Lynn, Kingston upon Thames, Knutsford, Leominster, Lewes, Lewisham West (replaced Lewisham), City of London (both seats), Maidstone, Maldon, New Forest & Christchurch (replaced New Forest), Newbury, Norwood, Oswestry, Oxford, Paddington North, Paddington South, Penryn and Falmouth, Petersfield, Portsmouth South (replaced 1 of 2 Portsmouth seats), Reigate, Rugby, Rye, St Albans, St Marylebone (replaced Marylebone West), St Pancras South East (replaced St Pancras South), St Pancras South West (replaced St Pancras West), Salisbury, Sevenoaks, Shrewsbury, Stalybridge and Hyde (replaced Stalybridge), Plymouth Sutton (replaced 1 of 2 Plymouth seats), Tamworth, Taunton, Tavistock, Tiverton, Tonbridge (replaced Tunbridge), Uxbridge, Wandsworth Central (replaced Wandsworth), Warwick and Leamington, Watford, Wells, Westminster Abbey (replaced Westminster), Wimbledon, Winchester, Windsor, Wirral, Wolverhampton West, Woodbridge, Worcester, Wycombe
Conservative	National		Bournemouth (replaced Christchurch)†, Walsall
Conservative	Independent		Hertford†
Conservative	abolished		Andover, Bath (1 of 2), Cirencester, Devonport (1 of 2), Marylebone East, Medway, Newport (Shropshire), Ramsey, St Augustine's, Stowmarket, Strand, Stratford upon Avon, Wellington (Somerset), Wilton, Wokingham, Woodstock
Ind. Conservative	Conservative		Canterbury†
UUP	UUP		
UUP	abolished		
Irish Unionist	abolished		
Seat created	Labour		Smethwick
Seat created	Coalition Labour		Cannock
Seat created	National Socialist Party		Silvertown
Seat created	National Democratic		Birmingham Duddeston, East Ham South
Seat created	Liberal		Portsmouth Central, Stourbridge
Seat created	National Liberal		Camberwell North-West, East Ham North, Leyton East
Seat created	Conservative		Acton, Aldershot, Balham and Tooting, Battersea South, Birkenhead West, Bristol Central, Bromley, Chislehurst, Croydon North, Birmingham Deritend, Edmonton, Farnham, Finchley, Fulham West, Hammersmith North, Hemel Hempstead, Hendon, Ilford, Birmingham King's Norton, Birmingham Ladywood, Lewisham East, Leyton West, Mitcham, Birmingham Moseley, Putney, Richmond (Surrey), Southend, Spelthorne, Stoke Newington, Stratford, Streatham, Surrey East, Tottenham North, Twickenham, Wallasey, Walthamstow East, Willesden East, Willesden West, Wood Green, Woolwich West, Birmingham Yardley
Seat created	UUP		

== See also ==
- 1918 United Kingdom general election in England
- 1918 United Kingdom general election in Ireland
- 1918 United Kingdom general election in Scotland
- 1918 United Kingdom general election in Wales
- List of United Kingdom Parliament constituencies (1885–1918) by region
- 1920 United States elections, the first held after the passage of the 19th amendment allowed American women to vote
- United Kingdom general elections
- List of MPs elected in the 1918 United Kingdom general election
- Parliamentary franchise in the United Kingdom 1885–1918, for details of the franchises replaced by the ones used in 1918

== Bibliography ==
- Adelman, Paul. The Decline of the Liberal Party 1910–1931 (2014).
- Ball, Stuart R. (1982), "Asquith's Decline and the General Election of 1918", Scottish Historical Review, 61 (171): 44–61, JSTOR 25529447
- Craig, F.W.S. (1989), British Electoral Facts: 1832–1987, Dartmouth: Gower, ISBN 0900178302
- Hallam, David J.A., Taking on the Men: the first women parliamentary candidates 1918, Studley 2018
- Hilson, Mary. "Women voters and the rhetoric of patriotism in the British general election of 1918" Women's History Review 10.2 (2001): 325–347.
- Koss, Stephen (1985). Asquith. London: Hamish Hamilton. ISBN 978-0-231-06155-1.
- McEwen, J. M. (1962), "The Coupon Election of 1918 and Unionist Members of Parliament", Journal of Modern History, 34 (3): 294–306, doi:10.1086/239118, JSTOR 1874358, S2CID 143523855
- McGill, Barry. "Lloyd George's Timing of the 1918 Election." Journal of British Studies 14.1 (1974): 109–124.
- Mowat, Charles Loch (1955), Britain between the wars, 1918–1940, Chicago: University of Chicago Press, pp. 2–9
- Ridley, Jane (2021), Never A Dull Moment, London: Chatto & Windus, ISBN 0701188707 (a biography of George V)
- Taylor, A. J. P. (1976), English History, 1914–1945, New York: Oxford University Press, pp. 127–128, ISBN 0198217153
- Turner, John (1992), British Politics and the Great War: Coalition and Conflict, 1915–1918, New Haven: Yale University Press, pp. 317–333, 391–436, ISBN 0300050461 (Covers the campaign as well as a statistical analysis of the vote)
- Wilson, Trevor (1964), "The Coupon and the British General Election of 1918", Journal of Modern History, 36 (1): 28–42, doi:10.1086/239234, JSTOR 1874424, S2CID 144905456
