= Sam Kyle =

Irish politician and trade unionist (1884–1962)

Senator
- In office 8 September 1943 – 21 April 1948
- Constituency: Labour Panel

Member of the Northern Ireland Parliament
- In office April 1925 – May 1929
- Constituency: Belfast North

Personal details
- Born: 7 November 1884 Belfast, Ireland
- Died: 12 May 1962 (aged 77) Dublin, Ireland
- Party: Independent Labour Party; Belfast Labour Party; Northern Ireland Labour Party; Irish Labour Party
- Spouse: Mary H. Kyle
- Children: 5

Samuel Kyle (7 November 1884 – 12 May 1962) was an Irish trade unionist and politician.

He was born into a Protestant family at 57 Riga Street in Belfast on 7 November 1884, he was the son of Samuel Kyle, a draper, and Jane Wilson. Kyle joined the Independent Labour Party. He became active in the Workers' Union, eventually becoming a full-time organiser for the union. At the 1918 general election, he stood in Belfast Shankill for the Belfast Labour Party. While unsuccessful, he was a prominent figure in the 1919 Belfast strike, and gained election to Belfast City Council in 1920.

The Labour Representation Committee became the main section of the Northern Ireland Labour Party (NILP), and Kyle was elected for the party at the 1925 Northern Ireland general election, to represent Belfast North, standing in opposition to partition. For the next four years, he acted as the leader of the NILP, pursuing a policy of working with sympathetic Nationalist Party MPs, and the independent Unionists Tommy Henderson and James Woods Gyle, to oppose the Ulster Unionist Party. After Nationalist Joe Devlin was suspended from the Parliament for attacking the Unionist Party as "villains, bullies, conspirators and ruffians", he led the NILP in joining with the Nationalists and two independent Unionist MPs in walking out, earning them suspensions from the body.

Following the restructuring of constituencies, Kyle stood in Belfast Oldpark at the 1929 Northern Ireland general election, but was unsuccessful, losing by just 189 votes.

In 1932, Kyle became the Irish secretary of the Amalgamated Transport and General Workers Union and moved to Dublin. In 1940, he was the President of the Irish Trades Union Congress. In 1943, he was elected on the Labour Panel of the Irish Senate, and sat as an Irish Labour Party member. He was re-elected in 1944, serving for five years in total.

He was married to Mary H. Kyle; and they had three sons and two daughters. He died on 12 May 1962 in Dublin, aged 77.

Parliament of Northern Ireland
Preceded by Lloyd Campbell; Samuel McGuffin; William Grant; Robert McKeown	Member of parliament for Belfast North; 1925–1929; With: Lloyd Campbell; William Grant; Tommy Henderson	Constituency abolished
Party political offices
New office	Chair of the Northern Ireland Labour Party; 1924–1925	Succeeded by William McMullen
New office	Leader of the Northern Ireland Labour Party at Stormont; 1925–1929	Succeeded by Jack Beattie
Trade union offices
Preceded by George Gillespie	Irish Secretary of the Transport and General Workers' Union; 1932–1949	Succeeded by Norman Kennedy
Preceded by P. T. Daly	President of the Irish Trades Union Congress; 1940	Succeeded by William O'Brien
Preceded by James Larkin Jnr	President of the Irish Trades Union Congress; 1950	Succeeded by Helen Chenevix
