= Bill Grant =

Bill Grant may refer to:

- Bill Grant (curler) (1882–1942), Canadian curler
- Bill Grant (Australian footballer) (1882–1947), Australian rules footballer
- Bill Grant (Gaelic footballer) (1891–1955), Irish Gaelic footballer
- Bill Grant (mandolinist) (1930-2019), American bluegrass musician
- Bill Grant (British politician) (born 1951), British Conservative MP for Ayr, Carrick and Cumnock
- Bill Grant (Florida politician) (born 1943), American politician from Florida

== See also ==
- William Grant (disambiguation)
