= History of Northern Ireland =

Northern Ireland is one of the four countries of the United Kingdom (although it is also described by official sources as a province or a region), situated in the north-east of the island of Ireland. It was created as a separate legal entity on 3 May 1921 under the Government of Ireland Act 1920. The new autonomous Northern Ireland was formed from six of the nine counties of Ulster: four counties with unionist majorities – Antrim, Armagh, Down, and Londonderry – and two counties with slight (Note: 53.6 and 54.6 per cent majorities respectively.) Irish nationalist majorities – Fermanagh and Tyrone – in the 1918 general election. The remaining three Ulster counties with larger nationalist majorities were not included. In large part unionists, at least in the north-east, supported its creation while nationalists were opposed.

The Troubles in Northern Ireland (1920–1922) were followed by decades of relatively peaceful rule by the Ulster Unionist Party-controlled government of Northern Ireland (1921–1972), interrupted by Luftwaffe attacks during World War II. Systemic discrimination against Catholics by the government ensured a high emigration rate from that community and contributed to its continued dislike of the partition of Ireland. The Troubles erupted in the late 1960s, and continued until the 1998 Belfast Agreement.

== Resistance to Home Rule ==
From the late 19th century, the majority of people living in Ireland wanted the British government to grant some form of self-rule to Ireland. The Irish Parliamentary Party (IPP) sometimes held the balance of power in the House of Commons in the late 19th and early 20th centuries, a position from which it sought to gain Home Rule, which would have given Ireland autonomy in internal affairs, without breaking up the United Kingdom. Two bills granting Home Rule to Ireland were passed by the House of Commons in 1886 and 1893, but rejected by the House of Lords. With the passing of the Parliament Act 1911 by the Liberal Party government (which reduced the powers of the Lords from striking down parliamentary Bills to delaying their implementation for two years), it was apparent that Home Rule would probably come into force in the next five years. The IPP and its predecessor, the Home Rule League, had been campaigning for this for almost fifty years.

However, a significant minority was vehemently opposed to the idea and wished to retain the Union in its existing form. Irish unionists had been agitating successfully against Home Rule since the 1880s, and on 28 September 1912, their leader, Edward Carson, introduced the Ulster Covenant in Belfast, pledging to exclude Ulster from home rule. The Covenant was signed by 450,000 men. Whilst precipitating a split with unionists in the south and west (including a particularly sizeable community in Dublin), it gave northern unionists a feasible goal to aim for.

By the early 20th century, Belfast, the largest city in Ulster, had become the largest city in Ireland. Its industrial economy, with strong engineering and shipbuilding sectors, was closely integrated with that of Great Britain. Belfast was a substantially Ulster Protestant city with a Catholic minority of less than 30 per cent, concentrated in the west of the city.

A third Home Rule Bill was introduced by the Liberal minority government in 1912. However, the Conservative Party was sympathetic to the unionist case, and so the political voice of Irish unionism was amplified in Parliament. After heavy amendment by the House of Lords, the Commons agreed in 1914 to allow four counties of Ulster to vote themselves out of its provisions for six years. Throughout 1913 and 1914, paramilitary militias were recruited and armed, firstly the unionist Ulster Volunteer Force (UVF), and in response, the nationalist Irish Volunteers. In reaction to the possibility of the UVF seizing weapons, units of the British army stationed in Ireland were ordered to occupy government buildings, to repel any assaults by the UVF and to guard armories. When (March 1914) orders were issued transferring officers from the main army base at the Curragh to the north of Ireland, numerous officers chose to resign their commissions rather than obey. See: Curragh incident. Events in Europe were to take precedence after the outbreak of World War I. Home rule was delayed for the duration of what was expected to be a short war, and unionist and nationalist leaders agreed to encourage their volunteers to join the British army.

== 1916: Easter Rising, Battle of the Somme and aftermath ==
During World War I, tensions continued to mount in Ireland. Hardline Irish separatists (known at the time as Irish Nationalists and later as Republicans) rejected Home Rule entirely because it involved maintaining the connection with Britain. They retained control of one faction of the Irish Volunteers, and in Easter 1916, led by Thomas Clarke, James Connolly and others attempted a rebellion in Dublin. After summary trials, the British government had the leaders executed for treason. The government blamed the small Sinn Féin party, which had little to do with it. The execution of the leaders of the rebellion turned out to be a propaganda coup for militant republicanism, and Sinn Féin's previously negligible popular support grew. The surviving leaders of the Irish Volunteers infiltrated the party and assumed its leadership in 1917. (The Irish Volunteers would later become the Irish Republican Army (IRA) in 1919.) Republicans gained further support when the British government attempted to introduce conscription to Ireland in 1918. Sinn Féin was at the forefront of organising the campaign against conscription.

The 36th (Ulster) Division was one of the first units in the British Army to be sent into the Somme beginning in July 1916. Despite being one of the few divisions to achieve their objectives, the Ulstermen suffered nearly 85% casualties. Though the 36th Division was made up of both Catholics and Protestants from the north, one result from the heavy losses at the Somme was that the Unionist community became evermore determined to remain in the United Kingdom, believing themselves to have sacrificed their sons at the behest of the Crown. Nationalists joined in great numbers as well, with "old" Irish regiments from Munster and Leinster being greatly strengthened by these recruits. When the veterans of World War I, on both sides of the political divide, returned from the Front in 1918 and 1919, they came back as battle-hardened soldiers. In the 1918 general election, the Irish Parliamentary Party lost almost all of its seats to Sinn Féin. Of the 30 seats in the six counties that would become Northern Ireland, 23 were won by Unionists, including three Labour Unionists and five of the six IPP members returned in Ireland were elected in Ulster as a result of local voting pacts with Sinn Féin.

Guerrilla warfare gathered pace in Ireland in the aftermath of the election, leading to the Anglo-Irish War. Although lower in intensity in Ulster than the rest of Ireland, the conflict was complicated there by involving not only the IRA, British Army and Royal Irish Constabulary, but the Ulster Volunteer Force (UVF) as well.

== Partition ==
Map of Ireland. The counties are indicated by thin black lines, including those in Ulster in green, and the modern territory of Northern Ireland indicated by a heavy black border across the island that separates six of the Ulster counties from the other three.

The fourth and final Home Rule Bill (the Government of Ireland Act 1920) partitioned the island into Northern Ireland (six northeastern counties) and Southern Ireland (the rest of the island). Some unionists such as Sir Edward Carson opposed partition, seeing it as a betrayal of unionism as a pan-Irish political movement. Three Counties unionists (those living in the Ulster counties of Cavan, Donegal, and Monaghan) who found themselves on the wrong side of the new border that partitioned Ulster, felt betrayed by those who had joined them in pledging to "stand by one another" in the Ulster Covenant. The Belfast Telegraph reassured unionists who felt guilty about this "that it was better for two-thirds of passengers to save themselves than for all to drown". Many Irish nationalists also opposed partition, although some were gratified that Northern Ireland contained a large nationalist minority that would deny it stability.

The Treaty was given effect in the United Kingdom through the Irish Free State Constitution Act 1922. Under Article 12 of the Treaty, Northern Ireland could exercise its opt out by presenting an address to the King requesting not to be part of the Irish Free State. Once the Treaty was ratified, the Parliament of Northern Ireland had one month to exercise this opt out during which month the Irish Free State Government could not legislate for Northern Ireland, holding the Free State's effective jurisdiction in abeyance for a month.

On 7 December 1922 (the day after the establishment of the Irish Free State) the Parliament of Northern Ireland resolved to make the following address to the King so as to opt out of the Irish Free State:

MOST GRACIOUS SOVEREIGN, We, your Majesty's most dutiful and loyal subjects, the Senators and Commons of Northern Ireland in Parliament assembled, having learnt of the passing of the Irish Free State Constitution Act, 1922, being the Act of Parliament for the ratification of the Articles of Agreement for a Treaty between Great Britain and Ireland, do, by this humble Address, pray your Majesty that the powers of the Parliament and Government of the Irish Free State shall no longer extend to Northern Ireland.

On 13 December 1922 Prime Minister James Craig addressed the Parliament of Northern Ireland informing them that the King had responded to the Parliament's address as follows:

I have received the Address presented to me by both Houses of the Parliament of Northern Ireland in pursuance of Article 12 of the Articles of Agreement set forth in the Schedule to the Irish Free State (Agreement) Act, 1922, and of Section 5 of the Irish Free State Constitution Act, 1922, and I have caused my Ministers and the Irish Free State Government to be so informed.

== Early years of Home Rule ==
Northern Ireland, having received self-government within the United Kingdom under the Government of Ireland Act, was in some respects left to its own devices.

The first years of the new autonomous region were marked by bitter violence, particularly in Belfast. The IRA was determined to oppose the partition of Ireland so the authorities created the (mainly ex-UVF) Ulster Special Constabulary to aid the Royal Irish Constabulary (RIC) and introduced emergency powers to combat the IRA. Many died in political violence between 1920 and 1923, when Belfast experienced the worst violence in its history. See Bloody Sunday (1921) and The Troubles in Northern Ireland (1920–1922). Killings petered out in 1923 after the signing of the Anglo-Irish Treaty in 1922.

In total, 636 people were killed between July 1920 and July 1922 in Northern Ireland. Approximately 460 of these deaths occurred in Belfast (258 Catholics, 159 Protestants, and 3 of unknown religion). However, as Catholics made up less than one-quarter of the population of the city, the per capita death rates were much higher.

The continuing violence created a climate of fear in the new region, and there was migration across the new border. As well as movement of Protestants from the Free State into Northern Ireland, some Catholics fled south, leaving some of those who remained feeling isolated. Despite the mixed religious affiliation of the old Royal Irish Constabulary and the transfer of many Catholic RIC police officers to the newly formed Royal Ulster Constabulary (1922), northern Catholics did not join the new force in great numbers. Many nationalists came to view the new police force as sectarian, adding to their sense of alienation from the state.

== 1925–1965 ==
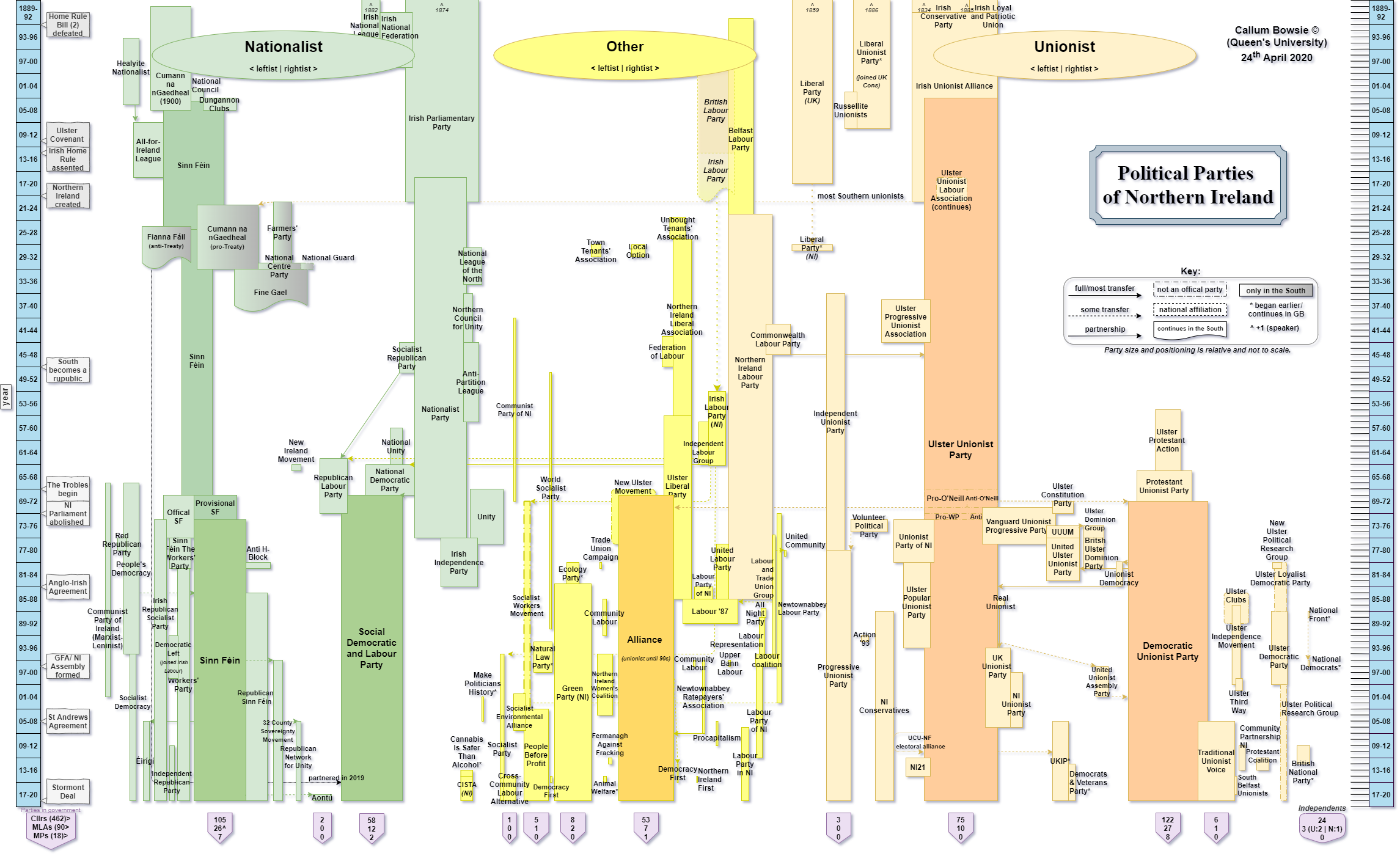
A flowchart illustrating all the political parties that have existed throughout the history of Northern Ireland and leading up to its formation (1889 onwards).

Under successive unionist prime ministers from Sir James Craig (later Lord Craigavon) onwards, the unionist establishment practised what is generally considered a policy of discrimination against the nationalist/Catholic minority.

This pattern was firmly established in the case of local government, where gerrymandered ward boundaries rigged local government elections to ensure unionist control of some local councils with nationalist majorities. In a number of cases, most prominently those of the Corporation of Derry, Omagh Urban District, and Fermanagh County Council, ward boundaries were drawn to place as many Catholics as possible into wards with overwhelming nationalist majorities while other wards were created where unionists had small but secure majorities, maximising unionist representation.

Voting provisions gave commercial companies multiple votes according to size and restricted the voting franchise to property owners, primary tenants and their spouses. Plural voting in local government elections by business owners continued in Great Britain until it was abolished, outside the City of London, by the Representation of the People Act 1969. It still exists in the City of London. The system of restricting the franchise ended in Great Britain in the 1940s but continued in Northern Ireland until 1969. and became increasingly resented. Disputes over local government gerrymandering were at the heart of the Northern Ireland civil rights movement in the 1960s.

In addition, there was widespread discrimination in employment, particularly at senior levels of the public sector and in certain sectors of the economy, such as shipbuilding and heavy engineering. Emigration to seek employment was significantly more prevalent among the Catholic population. As a result, Northern Ireland's demography shifted further in favour of Protestants, leaving their ascendancy seemingly impregnable by the late 1950s.

The abolition of proportional representation in 1929 meant that the structure of party politics gave the Ulster Unionist Party a continual sizeable majority in the Parliament of Northern Ireland, leading to fifty years of one-party rule. While nationalist parties continued to retain the same number of seats that they had under proportional representation, the Northern Ireland Labour Party and various smaller leftist unionist groups were smothered, meaning that it proved impossible for any group to sustain a challenge to the Ulster Unionist Party from within the unionist section of the population.

In 1935, the worst violence since partition convulsed Belfast. After an Orange Order parade decided to return to the city centre through a Catholic area instead of its usual route; the resulting violence left nine people dead. Over 2,000 Catholics were forced to leave their homes across Northern Ireland.

While disputed for decades, many unionist leaders now admit that the Northern Ireland government in the period 1922–72 was discriminatory, although prominent Democratic Unionist Party figures continue to deny it or its extent. One unionist leader, Nobel Peace Prize joint-winner, former UUP leader and First Minister of Northern Ireland, David Trimble, described Northern Ireland as having been a "cold house for Catholics".

Despite this, Northern Ireland was relatively peaceful for most of the period from 1924 until the late 1960s, except for some brief flurries of IRA activity, the (Luftwaffe) Belfast blitz during the Second World War in 1941 and the Border Campaign from 1956 to 1962. It found little support among nationalists. However, many Catholics were resentful towards the state, and nationalist politics was fatalist. Meanwhile, the period saw an almost complete synthesis between the Ulster Unionist Party and the loyalist Orange Order, with Catholics (even unionist Catholics) being excluded from any position of political or civil authority outside of a handful of nationalist-controlled councils.

Throughout this time, although the Catholic birth rate remained higher than for Protestants, the Catholic proportion of the population declined, as poor economic prospects, especially west of the River Bann, saw Catholics emigrate in disproportionate numbers.

Nationalist political institutions declined, with the Nationalist Party boycotting the Stormont Parliament for much of this period and its constituency organisations reducing to little more than shells. Sinn Féin was banned although it often operated through the Republican Clubs or similar vehicles. At various times the party stood and won elections on an abstentionist platform.

Labour-based politics were weak in Northern Ireland in comparison with Britain. A small Northern Ireland Labour Party existed but suffered many splits to both nationalist and unionist factions.

=== Second World War ===
Northern Ireland was exempted from conscription laws at the outset of the war in 1939.

==== Belfast ====
Belfast was a representative British city that has been well studied by historians. It was a key industrial city producing ships, tanks, aircraft, engineering works, arms, uniforms, parachutes and a host of other industrial goods. The unemployment that had been so persistent in the 1930s disappeared, and labour shortages appeared. There was a major munitions strike in 1944. As a key industrial city, Belfast became a target for German bombing missions, but it was thinly defended; there were only 24 anti-aircraft guns in the city. The Northern Ireland government under Richard Dawson Bates (Minister for Home Affairs) had prepared too late, assuming that Belfast was far enough away to be safe. When Germany conquered France in Spring 1940 it gained closer airfields. The city's fire brigade was inadequate, there were no public air raid shelters as the Northern Ireland government was reluctant to spend money on them, and there were no searchlights in the city, which made shooting down enemy bombers all the more difficult. After the Blitz in London during the autumn of 1940, the government began to build air raid shelters. In early 1941, the Luftwaffe flew reconnaissance missions that identified the docks and industrial areas to be targeted. Working class areas in the north and east of the city were particularly hard hit, as over 1,000 people were killed and hundreds were seriously injured. Many people left the city in fear of future attacks. The bombing revealed terrible slum conditions in the city. In May 1941, in the final raid of the war on Belfast, Luftwaffe bombs inflicted extensive damage to the docks and the Harland and Wolff shipyard, closing it for six months. The Belfast blitz saw half of the city's houses destroyed. About £20 million worth of damage was caused. The Northern Ireland government was criticised heavily for its lack of preparation, and Northern Ireland's prime minister J. M. Andrews resigned.

==== Derry ====
With the outbreak of the Second World War and the start of the Battle of the Atlantic, the Admiralty decided to develop a large new naval base in Northern Ireland to serve as a base for convoy escorts, providing repair and refuelling facilities. Derry was selected as a prime location due to Londonderry Port being the UK's most westerly port, providing the fastest access into the Atlantic. The naval base, named HMS Ferret, was a shore establishment. It was given a ship's name as a stone frigate. After the end of the war, large numbers of captured German U-boats were surrendered to British forces on the Scottish and Irish coasts and were brought to Lisahally.

== The Troubles ==
=== Beginnings ===
The Troubles were a period of ethno-political conflict in Northern Ireland which spilled over at various times into England, the Republic of Ireland, and mainland Europe. The duration of the Troubles is conventionally dated from the late 1960s and considered by many to have ended with the Belfast "Good Friday" Agreement of 1998. Violence nonetheless continues on a sporadic basis.

In the 1960s, moderate unionist prime minister Terence O'Neill (later Lord O'Neill of the Maine) tried to introduce reforms, but encountered strong opposition from both fundamentalist Protestant leaders like Ian Paisley and within his own party. The increasing pressures from Irish nationalists for reform and opposition by Ulster loyalists to compromise led to the appearance of the Northern Ireland Civil Rights Association, under figures such as Austin Currie and John Hume. It had some moderate Protestant support and membership, and a considerable dose of student radicalism after Northern Ireland was swept up in the worldwide protests of 1968. Clashes between marchers and the RUC led to increased communal strife, culminating in an attack by a unionist mob (which included police reservists) on a march, known as the Burntollet bridge incident, outside Derry on 4 January 1969. Wholescale violence erupted after an Apprentice Boys march was forced through the Irish nationalist Bogside area of Derry on 12 August 1969 by the RUC, which led to large-scale disorder known as the Battle of the Bogside. Rioting continued until 14 August, and in that time 1,091 canisters, each containing 12.5g of CS gas and 14 canisters containing 50g, were released by the RUC. Even more severe rioting broke out in Belfast and elsewhere in response to events in Derry (see Northern Ireland riots of August 1969). The following thirty years of civil strife came to be known as "the Troubles".

At the request of the unionist-controlled Northern Ireland government, the British army was deployed by the UK home secretary James Callaghan two days later on 14 August 1969. Two weeks later, control of security in Northern Ireland was passed from the Stormont government to Lieutenant-general Ian Freeland (GOC). At first the soldiers received a warm welcome from Irish nationalists, who hoped they would protect them from loyalist attack (which the IRA had, for ideological reasons, not done effectively). However, tensions rose throughout the following years, with an important milestone in the worsening relationship between the British Army and Irish nationalists being the Falls Curfew of 3 July 1970, when 3,000 British troops imposed a three-day curfew on the Lower Falls area of West Belfast.

After the introduction of internment without trial for suspected IRA men on 9 August 1971, even the most moderate Irish nationalists reacted by completely withdrawing their co-operation with the state. The Social Democratic and Labour Party (SDLP) members of the Parliament of Northern Ireland withdrew from that body on 15 August and a widespread campaign of civil disobedience began.

=== 1972–1974 ===
Tensions rose higher after the killing of fourteen unarmed civilians in Derry by the 1st Battalion, Parachute Regiment on 30 January 1972, an event dubbed Bloody Sunday. Many civilians were killed and injured by the indiscriminate bombing campaigns carried out, mainly by the Provisional IRA. Throughout this period, the main paramilitary organisations began to form. In 1970 the Provisional IRA, was created as a breakaway from what then became known as the Official IRA. The Provisionals came from various political perspectives, though most rejected the increasingly Marxist outlook of the Officials and were united in their rejection of the Official's view that physical force alone would not end partition. A campaign of sectarian attacks by loyalist paramilitary groups like the Ulster Defence Association (formed to co-ordinate the various Loyalist vigilante groups that sprung up) and others brought Northern Ireland to the brink of civil war. On 30 March 1972, the British government, unwilling to grant the unionist Northern Ireland government more authoritarian special powers, and now convinced of its inability to restore order, pushed through emergency legislation that prorogued the Northern Ireland Parliament and introduced direct rule from London. 1972 was the most violent year of the conflict. In 1973 the British government dissolved the Parliament of Northern Ireland and its government under the Northern Ireland Constitution Act 1973.

The British government held talks with various parties, including the Provisional IRA, during 1972 and 1973. The Official IRA declared a ceasefire in 1972, and eventually ended violence against the British altogether, although a breakaway group, the Irish National Liberation Army, continued. The Provisional IRA remained the largest and most effective nationalist paramilitary group.

On 9 December 1973, after talks in Sunningdale, Berkshire, the UUP, SDLP and Alliance Party of Northern Ireland and both governments reached the Sunningdale Agreement on a cross-community government for Northern Ireland, which took office on 1 January 1974. The Provisional IRA was unimpressed, increasing the tempo of its campaign, while many unionists were outraged at the participation of Irish nationalists in the government of Northern Ireland and at the cross-border Council of Ireland. Although the pro-Sunningdale parties had a clear majority in the new Northern Ireland Assembly, the failure of the pro-Agreement parties to co-ordinate their efforts in the general election of 28 February, combined with an IRA-sponsored boycott by hardline republicans, allowed anti-Sunningdale unionists to take 51.1% of the vote and 11 of Northern Ireland's 12 seats in the UK House of Commons.

Emboldened by this, a coalition of anti-Agreement unionist politicians and paramilitaries organised the Ulster Workers' Council strike which began on 15 May. The strikers brought Northern Ireland to a standstill by shutting down power stations, and after Prime Minister Harold Wilson refused to send in troops to take over from the strikers, the power-sharing executive collapsed on 28 May 1974.

Some British politicians, notably former British Labour minister Tony Benn, advocated British withdrawal from Ireland, but many opposed this policy, and called their prediction of the possible results of British withdrawal the 'Doomsday Scenario', anticipating widespread communal strife. The worst fear envisaged a civil war which would engulf not just Northern Ireland, but also the Republic of Ireland and Scotland, both of which had major links with the people of Northern Ireland. Later, the feared possible impact of British withdrawal was the 'Balkanisation' of Northern Ireland.

The level of violence declined from 1972 onwards, decreasing to under 150 deaths a year after 1976 and under 100 after 1988. The Provisional IRA, using weapons and explosives smuggled from the United States, the Republic of Ireland, and Libya, bombed England and various British army bases in continental Europe, as well as conducting ongoing attacks within Northern Ireland. These attacks were not only on security targets but also on commercial properties and various city centres. Arguably its signature attack would involve cars packed with high explosives. At the same time, loyalist paramilitaries largely (but not exclusively) focused their campaign within Northern Ireland, ignoring the uninvolved military of the Republic of Ireland, and instead claiming a (very) few republican paramilitary casualties. They usually targeted Catholics (especially those working in Protestant areas), and attacked Catholic-frequented pubs using automatic fire weapons. Such attacks were euphemistically known as "spray jobs". Both groups would also carry out extensive "punishment" attacks against members of their own communities for a variety of perceived, alleged, or suspected crimes.

=== 1975–1998 ===
Various fitful political talks took place from then until the early 1990s, backed by schemes such as rolling devolution, and 1975 saw a brief Provisional IRA ceasefire. The two events of real significance during this period, however, were the hunger strikes (1981) and the Anglo-Irish Agreement (1985).

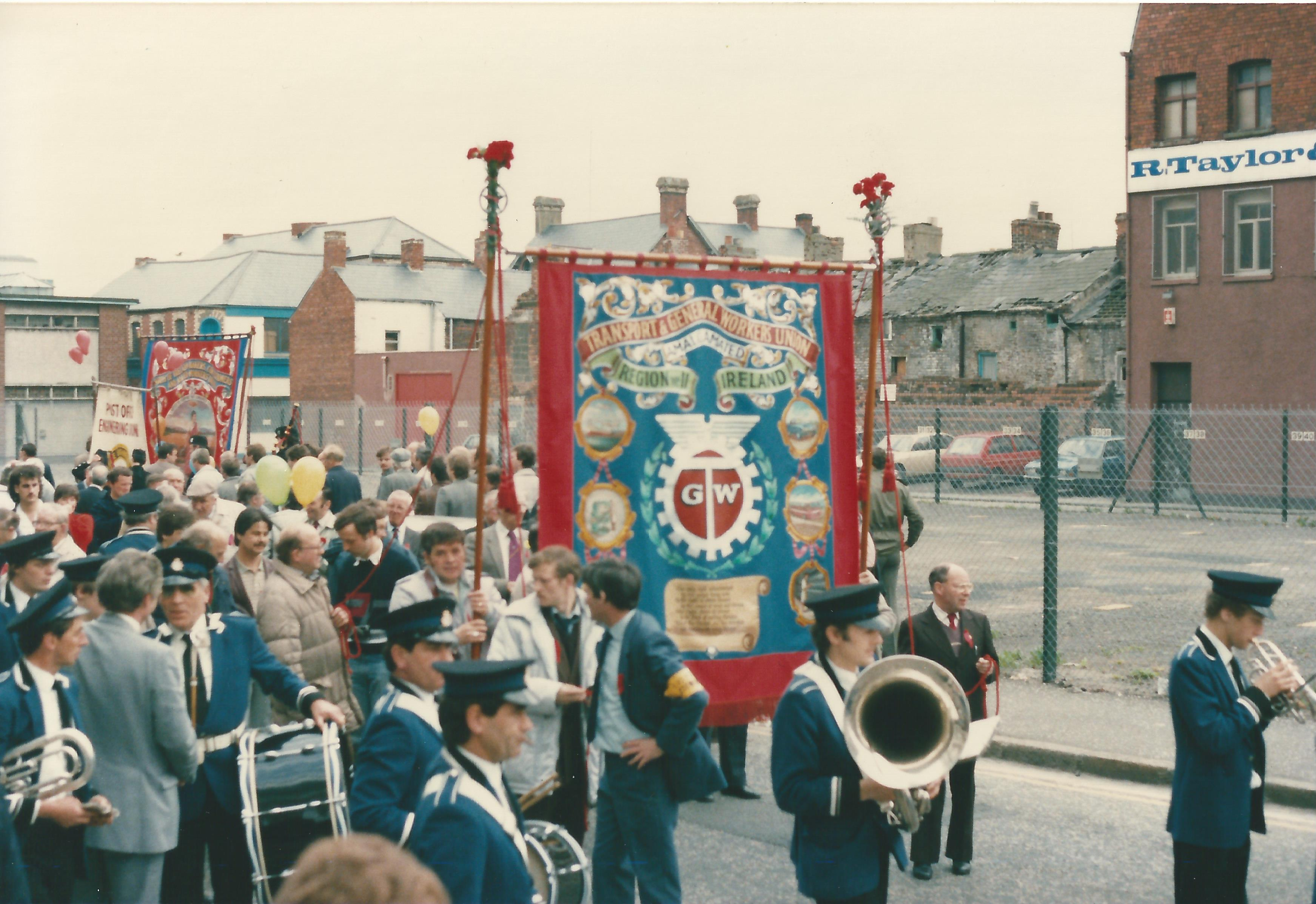
May Day march in Belfast, 1984

Despite the failure of the hunger strike, the modern republican movement made its first foray into electoral politics, with modest electoral success on both sides of the border, including the election of Bobby Sands to the House of Commons. This convinced republicans to adopt the Armalite and ballot box strategy and gradually take a more political approach.

While the Anglo-Irish Agreement failed to bring an end to political violence in Northern Ireland, it did improve co-operation between the British and Irish governments, which was key to the creation of the Good Friday Agreement a decade later.

At a strategic level the agreement demonstrated that the British recognised as legitimate the wishes of the Republic to have a direct interest in the affairs of Northern Ireland. It also demonstrated to paramilitaries that their refusal to negotiate with the governments might be self-defeating in the long run. Unlike the Sunningdale Agreement, the Anglo-Irish Agreement withstood a much more concerted campaign of violence and intimidation, as well as political hostility, from unionists. However, unionists from across the spectrum felt betrayed by the British government and relations between unionists and the British government were at their worst point since the Ulster Covenant in 1912, with similar mass rallies in Belfast. Unionist co-operation needed in tackling Republican violence became so damaged that in 1998 Margaret Thatcher said she regretted signing the Agreement for this reason. Republicans were also left in the position of rejecting the only significant all-Ireland structures created since partition.

By the 1990s, the perceived stalemate between the IRA and British security forces, along with the increasing political successes of Sinn Féin, convinced a majority inside the republican movement that greater progress towards republican objectives might be achieved through negotiation rather than violence at this stage. This change from paramilitary to political means was part of a broader Northern Ireland peace process, which followed the appearance of new leaders in London (John Major) and Dublin (Albert Reynolds).

== Northern Ireland Assembly ==
=== The Belfast Agreement/ Good Friday Agreement ===
General election results 1997 to present. In general, the Ulster Unionist Party and SDLP have lost support, while Sinn Féin, the Democratic Unionist Party and Alliance have risen.

Increased government focus on the problems of Northern Ireland led, in 1993, to the two prime ministers signing the Downing Street Declaration. At the same time Gerry Adams, leader of Sinn Féin, and John Hume, leader of the Social Democratic and Labour Party, engaged in talks. The UK political landscape changed dramatically when the 1997 general election saw the return of a Labour government, led by prime minister Tony Blair, with a large parliamentary majority. A new leader of the Ulster Unionist Party, David Trimble, initially perceived as a hardliner, brought his party into the all-party negotiations which in 1998 produced the Belfast Agreement ("Good Friday Agreement"), signed by eight parties on 10 April 1998, although not involving Ian Paisley's Democratic Unionist Party or the UK Unionist Party. A majority of both communities in Northern Ireland approved this Agreement, as did the people of the Republic of Ireland, both by referendum on 22 May 1998. The Republic amended its constitution, to replace a claim it made to the territory of Northern Ireland with an affirmation of the right of all the people of Ireland to be part of the Irish nation and a declaration of an aspiration towards a United Ireland (see the Nineteenth Amendment of the Constitution of Ireland).

Under the Good Friday Agreement, properly known as the Belfast Agreement, voters elected a new Northern Ireland Assembly to form a parliament. Every party that reaches a specific level of support gains the right to name members of its party to government and claim one or more ministries. Ulster Unionist party leader David Trimble became First Minister of Northern Ireland. The Deputy Leader of the SDLP, Seamus Mallon, became Deputy First Minister of Northern Ireland, though his party's new leader, Mark Durkan, subsequently replaced him. The Ulster Unionists, Social Democratic and Labour Party, Sinn Féin and the Democratic Unionist Party each had ministers by right in the power-sharing assembly.

The Assembly and its Executive operated on a stop-start basis, with repeated disagreements about whether the IRA was fulfilling its commitments to disarm, and also allegations from the Police Service of Northern Ireland's Special Branch that there was an IRA spy-ring operating in the heart of the civil service. It has since emerged that the spy-ring was run by MI5 (see Denis Donaldson). Northern Ireland was then, once more, run by the Direct Rule Secretary of State for Northern Ireland, Peter Hain, and a British ministerial team answerable to him. Hain was answerable only to the Cabinet.

The changing British position to Northern Ireland was represented by the visit of Queen Elizabeth II to Stormont, where she met nationalist ministers from the SDLP as well as unionist ministers and spoke of the right of people who perceive themselves as Irish to be treated as equal citizens along with those who regard themselves as British. Similarly, on visits to Northern Ireland, the president of Ireland, Mary McAleese, met with unionist ministers and with the Lord Lieutenant of each county – the official representatives of the Queen.

Dissident Republicans in the Provisional IRA who refused to recognize the Good Friday Agreement split from the main body and formed a separate entity known as the Real IRA. It was this paramilitary group that was responsible for the Omagh Bombing in August 1998 that claimed the lives of 29 including a mother and her unborn twins. In a break from traditional Republican policy, Martin McGuinness officially condemned the actions of the Real IRA, setting a precedent that resulted in the alienation and minuscule support for dissident groups within the Republican movement.

=== Government collapse of 2002-2007 ===
However, the Assembly elections of 30 November 2003 saw Sinn Féin and the Democratic Unionist Party (DUP) emerge as the largest parties in each community, which was perceived as making a restoration of the devolved institutions more difficult to achieve. However, serious talks between the political parties and the British and Irish governments saw steady, if stuttering, progress throughout 2004, with the DUP in particular surprising many observers with its newly discovered pragmatism. However, an arms-for-government deal between Sinn Féin and the DUP broke down in December 2004 due to a row over whether photographic evidence of IRA decommissioning was necessary, and the IRA refusal to countenance the provision of such evidence.

The 2005 British general election saw further polarisation, with the DUP making sweeping gains, although Sinn Féin did not make the breakthrough many had predicted. In particular, the failure of Sinn Féin to gain the SDLP leader Mark Durkan's Foyle seat marked a significant rebuff for the republican party. The UUP only took one seat, with the leader David Trimble losing his and subsequently resigning as leader.

On 28 July 2005, the IRA made a public statement ordering an end to the armed campaign and instructing its members to dump arms and to pursue purely political programmes. While the British and Irish governments warmly welcomed the statement, political reaction in Northern Ireland itself demonstrated a tendency to suspicion engendered by years of political and social conflict. In August the British government announced that due to the security situation improving and in accordance with the Good Friday Agreement provisions, Operation Banner would end by 1 August 2007.

On 13 October 2006 an agreement was proposed after three days of multiparty talks at St. Andrews in Scotland, which all parties including the DUP, supported. Under the agreement, Sinn Féin would fully endorse the police in Northern Ireland, and the DUP would share power with Sinn Féin. All the main parties in Northern Ireland, including the DUP and Sinn Féin, subsequently formally endorsed the agreement.

=== 2007-2017 governance ===
On 8 May 2007, devolution of powers returned to Northern Ireland. DUP leader Ian Paisley and Sinn Féin's Martin McGuinness took office as First Minister and Deputy First Minister, respectively. (BBC). "You Raise Me Up", the 2005 track by Westlife, was played at their inauguration.

On 5 June 2008, Peter Robinson was confirmed as First Minister, succeeding Ian Paisley. In November 2015 he announced his intention to resign, stepping down officially in January 2016.

His successor as the leader of the Democratic Unionist Party (DUP), Arlene Foster, became the new First Minister on 11 January 2016. She was the first woman to hold the post of First Minister.

=== Government collapse of 2017-2020 ===
On 9 January 2017, following the Renewable Heat Incentive scandal, Martin McGuinness resigned as deputy First Minister, triggering the 2017 Northern Ireland Assembly election and the collapse of the Northern Ireland Executive. Since then, the Executive has been in suspension and has not reformed.

The election marked a significant shift in Northern Ireland's politics, being the first election since Ireland's partition in 1921 in which unionist parties did not win a majority of seats, and the first time that unionist and nationalist parties received equal representation in the Assembly (39 members between Sinn Féin and the SDLP, 39 members between the DUP, UUP, and TUV). The DUP's loss of seats also prevents it from unilaterally using the petition of concern mechanism, which the party had controversially used to block measures such as the introduction of same-sex marriage to Northern Ireland.

UUP leader Mike Nesbitt announced his resignation, following the party's failure to make any breakthrough.

Sinn Féin reiterated that it would not return to a power-sharing arrangement with the DUP without significant changes in the DUP's approach, including Foster not becoming First Minister until the RHI investigation is complete. The parties had three weeks to form an administration; failing that, new elections would likely be called.

While unionism has lost its overall majority in the Assembly, the result has been characterised by political analyst Matthew Whiting as being more about voters seeking competent local leadership, and about the DUP having less success than Sinn Féin in motivating its traditional voter base to turn out, than about a significant move towards a united Ireland.

Secretary of State for Northern Ireland James Brokenshire gave the political parties more time to reach a coalition agreement after the 27 March deadline passed. Sinn Féin called for fresh elections if agreement could not be reached. Negotiations were paused over Easter, but Brokenshire threatened a new election or direct rule if no agreement could be reached by early May. On 18 April, the Conservative Party prime minister, Theresa May, then called a snap general election for 8 June 2017. A new deadline of 29 June was then set for power-sharing talks.

The UK general election saw both the DUP and Sinn Féin advance, with the UUP and SDLP losing all their MPs. The overall result saw the Conservatives losing seats, resulting in a hung parliament. May sought to continue as prime minister running a minority administration through seeking the support of the DUP. Various commentators suggested this raised problems for the UK government's role as a neutral arbiter in Northern Ireland, as is required under the Good Friday Agreement. Talks restarted on 12 June 2017, while a Conservative–DUP agreement was announced and published on 26 June.

A new deadline was set for 29 June, but it appeared that no agreement would be reached in time, with the main sticking point over Sinn Féin's desire for an Irish language act, rejected by the DUP, while Sinn Féin reject a hybrid act that also covers Ulster Scots. The deadline passed with no resolution. Brokenshire extended the time for talks, but Sinn Féin and the DUP remained pessimistic about any quick resolution.

Negotiations resumed in the autumn of 2017 but failed, leaving it in the hands of the UK Parliament to pass a budget for the ongoing financial year of 2017–18. The bill, which began its passage on 13 November, would if enacted release the final 5% of Northern Ireland's block grant.

==== Negotiations resume, 2018 ====
Talks between the DUP and Sinn Féin recommenced on 6 February 2018, only days before the mid-February deadline where, in the absence of an agreement, a regional budget will have to be imposed by Westminster. Despite being attended by Theresa May and Leo Varadkar, the talks collapsed and DUP negotiator Simon Hamilton stated "significant and serious gaps remain between ourselves and Sinn Féin". The stalemate continued into September, at which point Northern Ireland reached 590 days without a fully functioning administration, eclipsing the record set in Belgium between April 2010 and December 2011.

On 18 October the Northern Ireland Secretary Karen Bradley introduced the Northern Ireland (Executive Formation and Exercise of Functions) Bill, removing the time frame of an Assembly election until 26 March 2019, which could be replaced by a later date by the Northern Ireland Secretary for once only, and during which the Northern Ireland Executive could be formed at any time, enabling civil servants to take a certain degree of departmental decisions that would be in public interest, and also allowing Ministers of the Crown to have several Northern Ireland appointments. The Bill's third reading was passed in the House of Commons and in the House of Lords on 24 and 30 October respectively. The Bill became Northern Ireland (Executive Formation and Exercise of Functions) Act 2018 and came into effect after it received Royal Assent and was passed on 1 November.

During question period to the Northern Ireland Secretary on 31 October Karen Bradley announced that she would hold a meeting in Belfast the following day with the main parties regarding the implementation of the Bill (which was not an Act yet on that day) and next steps towards the restoration of the devolution and that she would fly to Dublin alongside Theresa May's de facto deputy David Lidington to hold an inter-governmental conference with the Irish Government. No deal was reached at that time.

==== Gay marriage and abortion ====
Gay marriage and the liberalisation of abortion was legalised in Northern Ireland on 22 October 2019. The legalisation received royal assent on 24 July 2019 by way of an amendment to the Northern Ireland (Executive Formation etc) Act 2019 which was primarily to implement sustainable governance in Northern Ireland in the absence of an executive. The British government stated that the legalisation would only come into effect if the executive was not functioning by 22 October deadline. Attempts to restart the assembly were made, predominantly by unionist parties, on 21 October, but Sinn Féin and Alliance refused to enter the Assembly. The legalisation was enacted and progress to restart Stormont stagnated for several months until a fresh election became likely.

==== COVID-19 ====
The COVID-19 pandemic reached Northern Ireland in February 2020. At the start of the first official lockdown, the Department of Health reported 3,445 deaths overall among people who had recently tested positive. The Northern Ireland Statistics and Research Agency reported 5,757 where the death certificate mentioned COVID as one possible cause (see Statistics). Northern Ireland has the lowest COVID death rate per population in the United Kingdom. Covid statistics were very available at the start of the pandemic. The vast majority of deaths were among those over the age of 60 and almost half were in care homes. According to figures, about 1 in 12 of over 5,700 who died from the acute infection were under 65.

On 23 March 2020, Northern Ireland went into lockdown with the rest of the UK. A stay-at-home order banned "non-essential" travel and contact with others, and schools, businesses, venues, amenities and places of worship were shut. Major events such as Saint Patrick's Day were cancelled. A lengthy lockdown was forecast to severely damage the economy and lead to a large rise in unemployment. The health service worked to raise hospital capacity. In mid-April, Department of Health modeling indicated the health service in Northern Ireland could cope with the expected peak in cases. On 21 April, Northern Ireland's chief scientific advisor said the curve of new cases had flattened, and the peak had passed.

The lockdown was gradually lifted in June–July, as infection and death rates dropped. Schools remained closed for summer break, but re-opened in September. The infection rate (or positivity rate) rose again that month and restrictions were re-imposed. On 16 October, Northern Ireland went into an eight-week lockdown, although schools remained open, and some restrictions were eased for one week. The lockdown was mostly lifted on 11 December. Following a brief easing of restrictions at Christmas, another lockdown was imposed on 26 December, including schools, as the positivity rate rose sharply. A mass vaccination program began, and the infection rate fell in early 2021. Schools re-opened in March, and the lockdown was gradually lifted from late April. In December, proof of vaccination or non-infection became mandatory to enter indoor venues.

=== 2020-2022 governance ===
In early January 2020, the British and Irish governments announced the text of a deal to restore power sharing in Northern Ireland, and to restore devolution.

The Northern Ireland Assembly and Executive (which collapsed three years ago) resumed on 11 January 2020 after an agreement titled 'New Decade, New Approach' was signed between the DUP and Sinn Féin, and the British and Irish governments, and subsequently by most other parties.

In April 2021, Arlene Foster announced that she would resign as DUP leader on 28 May and end her tenure as First Minister at the end of June 2021.

On 3 February 2022, Paul Givan resigned as first minister, which automatically resigned Michelle O'Neill as deputy first minister and collapsed the executive of Northern Ireland.

=== The DUP Boycott of the NI Protocol and Restoration of Stormont 2024- present ===
On 18 January 2024, over 100,000 workers from the National Health Service, Translink NI and teachers' unions stage the Public Sector Strike over pay in many towns and cities including Belfast. On 30 January 2024, leader of the Democratic Unionist Party Jeffrey Donaldson announced that the DUP would restore an executive government on the condition that new legislation was passed by the UK house of commons. After two years of suspension, the NI Assembly meet on 3 February 2024 and appoint Michelle O'Neill as First Minister and Emma Little-Pengelly as Deputy First minister. This is the first time in the history of Northern Ireland that a republican has become First Minister.

== See also ==
- Flag of Northern Ireland
- History of Ireland
- History of the United Kingdom
- Murals in Northern Ireland
- History of the British Isles
- Politics of Northern Ireland
