= William Grant (Northern Ireland politician) =

Unionist politician in Northern Ireland (1883–1949)

William Grant PC (NI) (6 April 1883 – 15 August 1949) was a Unionist politician in Northern Ireland.

Born at 110 Earl Street in Belfast, son of linen worker Martin Grant and Mary Ann Gibson, Grant worked as a shipwright and was a founder member of the Ulster Unionist Labour Association. He was also a founder member of the Ulster Volunteers. He was elected to the Northern Ireland House of Commons as an Ulster Unionist Party member for Belfast North in 1929, then winning Belfast Duncairn in 1929, holding this until his death.

Grant became Parliamentary Secretary to the Ministry of Labour in 1938, then Minister of Public Security in 1941. As a cabinet post, this carried with it membership of the Privy Council of Northern Ireland which entitled him to the style The Right Honourable . He was then appointed Minister of Labour from 1943 until 1944 and briefly in 1945, and also served as Minister of Health and Local Government from 1944 until his death.

Parliament of Northern Ireland
New constituency	Member of Parliament for Belfast North; 1921–1929; With: Lloyd Campbell 1921–1929; Robert McKeown 1921–1925; Samuel McGuffin 1921–1925; Tommy Henderson 1925–1929; Sam Kyle 1925–1929	Constituency abolished
New constituency	Member of Parliament for Belfast Duncairn; 1929–1949	Succeeded by George Hanna
Political offices
Preceded by John Fawcett Gordon	Parliamentary Secretary to the Ministry of Labour; 1938–1941	Succeeded by Rowley Elliott
Preceded by John MacDermott	Minister of Public Security; 1941–43	Succeeded by Harry Midgley
Preceded by John Fawcett Gordon	Minister of Labour; 1943–44	Succeeded by Harry Midgley
New office	Minister of Health and Local Government; 1944–1949	Succeeded by Dehra Parker
Preceded by Harry Midgley	Minister of Labour; 1945	Succeeded by Brian Maginess
