= Belfast Shankill (UK Parliament constituency) =

Parliamentary constituency in the United Kingdom, 1918–1922

- Former borough constituency for the House of Commons
- Borough: Belfast

1918–1922
- Seats: 1
- Created from: Belfast North
- Replaced by: Belfast North

Shankill, a division of the parliamentary borough of Belfast, was a UK parliamentary constituency in Northern Ireland. It returned one Member of Parliament (MP) to the House of Commons of the United Kingdom from 1918 to 1922, on the electoral system of first past the post.

== History ==
Under the Redistribution of Seats Act 1885, the parliamentary borough of Belfast had been divided into four divisions: Belfast East, Belfast North, Belfast South and Belfast West. Under the Redistribution of Seats (Ireland) Act 1918, it was increased to nine divisions. Shankill was created from Belfast North and was defined as:

the Shankill Municipal Ward of the Borough, and that part of Clifton Ward which is not included in the Duncairn Division.

At the 1918 general election, Sinn Féin issued an election manifesto in which it called for the "establishment of a constituent assembly comprising persons chosen by Irish constituencies". After the election, Sinn Féin invited all those elected for Irish constituencies to sit as members of Dáil Éireann, termed Teachta Dála (or TD, known in English as a Deputy). In practice, only those elected for Sinn Féin attended. The seat was won by Samuel McGuffin, a Labour Unionist associated with the Ulster Unionist Party. Therefore, no representative from Shankill attended the First Dáil.

The Government of Ireland Act 1920 established the Parliament of Northern Ireland, with a 52-member Northern Ireland House of Commons (NIHC). The representation of Northern Ireland at Westminster was reduced from 30 to 13. Under the revision of constituencies, the area was combined with the Duncairn Division to form Belfast North, a 4-seat constituency for the NIHC and a single-seat constituency at Westminster. At the 1921 election, Samuel McGuffin was elected as an Ulster Unionist MP to the 1st House of Commons of Northern Ireland. Sinn Féin treated this as part of an election to the Second Dáil. There was no representative from this constituency in the Second Dáil.

The 1922 United Kingdom general election took place on 15 November, with an overall reduction in seats from Northern Ireland.

== Members of Parliament ==
Election	MP	Party
1918	Samuel McGuffin	Labour Unionist
1922	Constituency abolished	

== Election ==
1918 general election: Belfast Shankill
Party	Candidate	Votes	%	±%
Labour Unionist	Samuel McGuffin	11,840	73.78	
Belfast Labour	Sam Kyle	3,674	22.89	
Sinn Féin	Michael Carolan	534	3.33	
Majority		8,166	50.88	
Turnout		16,048	69.86	
Labour Unionist win (new seat)				

== See also ==
- List of United Kingdom Parliament constituencies in Ireland and Northern Ireland
- List of MPs elected in the 1918 United Kingdom general election
- Historic Dáil constituencies
