= William Grant (New Zealand) =

- Born: 23 September 1843; Contin, Scotland
- Died: 5 November 1910 (aged 67); Timaru, New Zealand
- Occupations: Shepherd and Landowner
- Spouse: Elizabeth Grant
- Children: 3 Sons, 2 Daughters
- Parent(s): Ann Tait, Donald Grant

William Grant (23 September 1843 - 5 November 1910) was a New Zealand shepherd, stock dealer and landowner. He was born in Contin, Ross-shire, Scotland on 23 September 1843.

== Biography ==
=== Early life ===
William Grant was born on Kirkan farm, in the parish of Contin, Ross-shire, Scotland, on 23 September 1843, the son of Ann Tait and her husband, Donald Grant, a shepherd.

=== Marriage and family ===
Grant married Elizabeth Helen Allan, the daughter of Robert Allan, a Timaru contractor, near Timaru on 30 April 1884. There were three sons and two daughters of the marriage. Their second son was Robert Allan Grant, a lieutenant in the RAF.

=== Career ===
==== Mutton Farm ====
With an older brother, Andrew, William set out for New Zealand in 1864 on the Eastern Empire, arriving at Lyttelton in January 1865. On the day they arrived Charles Tripp of Orari Gorge station was at the port looking for shepherds for his run in South Canterbury. Observing a fine-looking sheep-dog with the Grant brothers, and assuming that only good shepherds would bring such a dog with them, he hired both men. Andrew was later appointed manager of Orari Gorge. In addition to wages, William was allowed to run some cattle of his own on part of Orari Gorge. This gave him a start in stock dealing, at which he was to become extremely successful, and he soon progressed into business as a full-time stock dealer. At first he drove cattle to the West Coast to supply beef to goldminers, but he was soon handling large numbers of sheep as well. During the 1870s William made Temuka his headquarters for a stock dealing business which in time extended well beyond Canterbury.

Grant had new opportunities with the beginning of the frozen-meat trade in the early 1880s. In 1885 the South Canterbury Refrigerating Company, in which Grant had a substantial shareholding, began operating from its Smithfield freezing works at Timaru, a short distance from Elloughton Grange. The company did not buy in stock, but handled consignments on behalf of owners. Filling the need for an on-farm purchaser, Grant was soon buying and supplying large numbers of stock to the works, to the point where he was using its total capacity for four and even five days a week. For a time a substantial part of the frozen meat leaving Timaru, including at least one entire shipload, was owned by William Grant.

==== Land Dealings ====
His land transactions were complex. With Andrew he bought a farm at Rangitata in the 1870s, and Richmond station at Lake Tekapo in 1880. A year later William purchased the 1,010-acre Elloughton Grange farm, which lay on the outskirts of Timaru, and lived there for the rest of his life. William and Andrew sold Richmond in 1882, and in the same year William sold his interest in the Rangitata farm. In 1883 he bought the Irishman Creek run in the centre of the Mackenzie Country, which he sold again in 1890. Probably to maintain a base for his stock dealings in that area he bought the Grampians run in 1892, which he owned until 1908. In 1902 he had bought Irishman Creek again, as well as the adjoining run, The Wolds. In 1893 he built The Grange, a two-storeyed, 17-roomed mansion, on Elloughton Grange. It was designed by the French-born Timaru architect Maurice Duval.

=== Death ===
In his later years, having largely retired from stock dealing, Grant paid all his attention to his land and financial interests. He was by then a very wealthy man, investing most of his fortune in first mortgages, usually to Scots, and often with a genuine helpfulness. William Grant died of a heart attack at Elloughton Grange early in the morning of 5 November 1910. He was buried at Timaru on 11 November. His estate was valued at £208,000. Elizabeth Grant continued to live at The Grange until her death in 1942.

== Recognition ==
Grant had a reputation amongst others as a plain, unassuming, good-natured man. He was said to look like King Edward VII. He was one of New Zealand's most successful meat operators, and for a long time the country's leading buyer and shipper.

== See also ==
List related Wikipedia articles in alphabetical order. Common nouns are listed first. Proper nouns follow.

- autobiography
- biography

== See also ==
- Mount William Grant
