= William K. Grant =

American diplomat

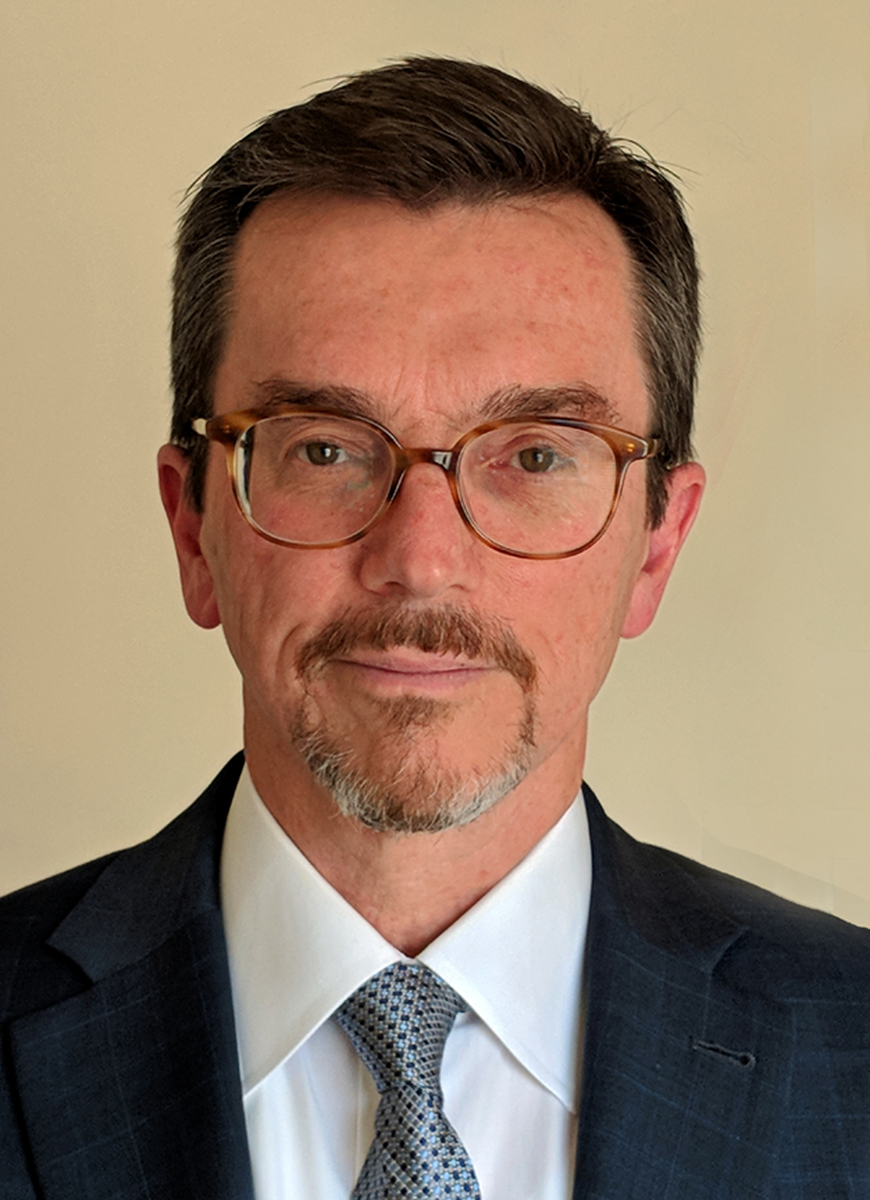
William K. Grant, 2018

William K. Grant is an American diplomat who was the head U.S. diplomat in Qatar from August 2018 until March 2020, as well as from July to November 2017. Grant joined the US State Department as a career foreign service officer in 1984. His other assignments included Lebanon, Israel, Iraq and the U.S. mission to the United Nations.

During Grant's tenure, The United States focused on several key priorities in Qatar. These included resolving a dispute initiated by some Gulf neighbors, expanding the U.S.- Qatar military relationship, and supporting Qatar's efforts to protect foreign workers.

In December 2018, the Anti-Defamation League reached out to Grant because of the Embassy's involvement in the Doha International Book Fair which the ADL says "has a record of promoting blatantly anti-Semitic content, which we and other concerned groups have previously noted. In past years, this book fair has also provided a platform to noted anti-Semitic hate preachers, such as Mohamed al-Arefe and Aidh al-Qarni." The U.S. Embassy immediately contacted the bookfair organizers who noted that such content violated the guidelines for exhibitors and strengthened controls to prevent the offer of material critical of any religion.
