= William Grant (physician) =

Scottish physician

- Died: 30 December 1786; Edinburgh, Scotland
- Occupation: Physician

William Grant (died 30 December 1786) was a Scottish physician.

== Biography ==
Grant was a native of Scotland, graduated M.D. at Aberdeen in 1755, and became licentiate of the London College of Physicians in 1763. He practised in the city of London with success, and was physician to the Misericordia Hospital, Goodman's Fields. He died in Edinburgh on 30 December 1786. His writings include:

- ‘An Inquiry into … the Fevers most common in London,’ 1771; French translation, 1773.
- ‘Observations … on Fevers,’ 1772; 3rd ed. 1779.
- ‘An Essay on the … Fever … commonly called Jail … Fever,’ 1775; German translation, 1778.
- ‘Account of the Epidemic Cough and Fever,’ 1776.
- ‘Account of a Fever and Sorethroat in London,’ 1777.
- ‘Observations on the Atrabilious Temperament and Gout,’ 1779–81.
- ‘Observations on the Influenza of 1775 and 1782,’ 1783.
