= Mount William Grant =

Mountain in New Zealand

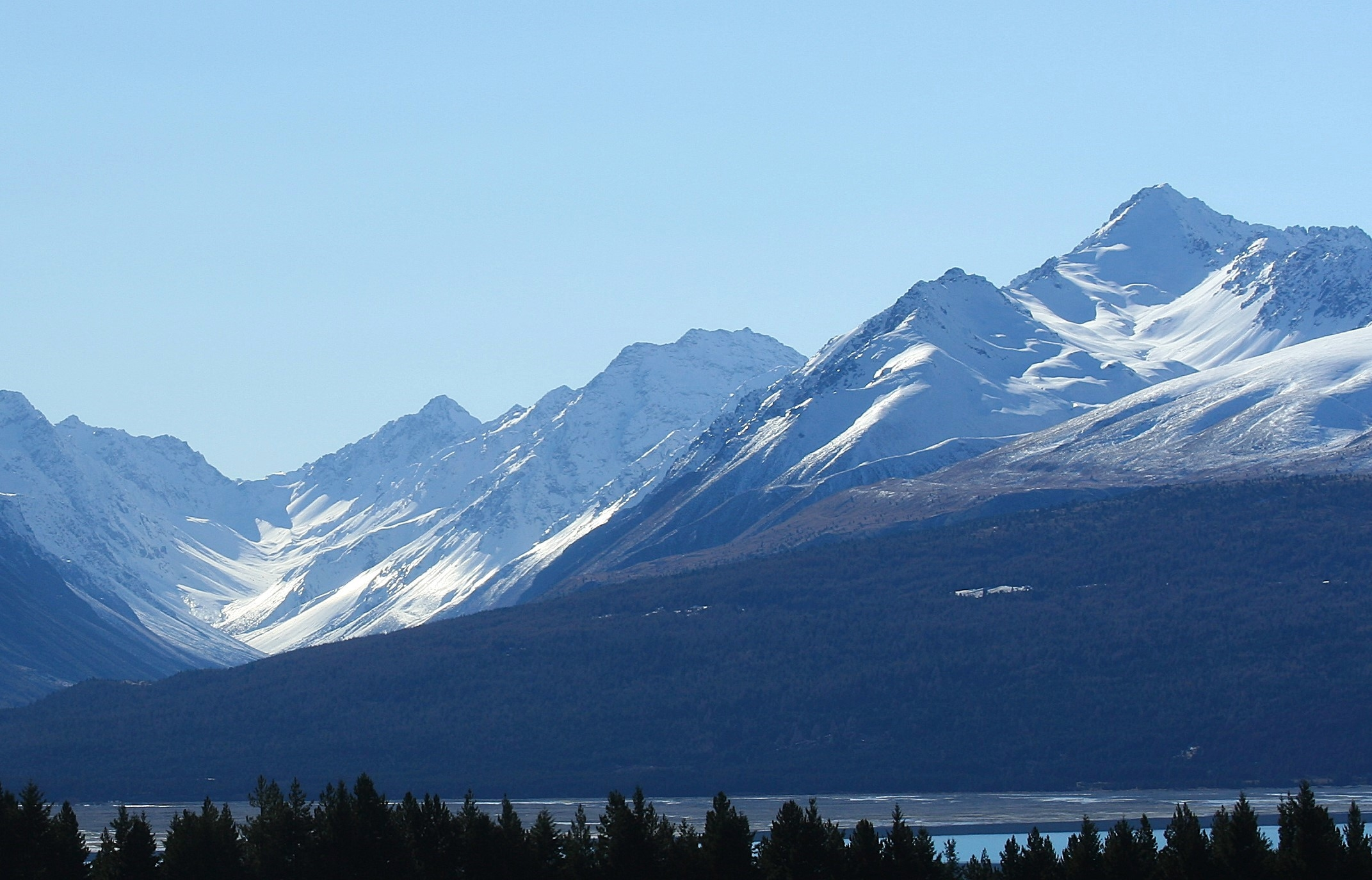
- Mount William Grant centred, from southwest

Highest point
- Elevation: 2,556 m (8,386 ft)
- Prominence: 472 m (1,549 ft)
- Isolation: 4.87 km (3.03 mi)
- Listing: New Zealand #57
- Coordinates: 43°42′17″S 170°19′16″E

Naming
- Etymology: William Grant

Geography
- Location within New Zealand
- Interactive map of Mount William Grant
- Location: South Island
- Country: New Zealand
- Region: Canterbury
- Parent range: Southern Alps; Gamack Range
- Topo map: Topo50 BX16

Mount William Grant is a 2,556-metre-elevation (8,386-foot) mountain in Canterbury, New Zealand.

== Description ==
Mount William Grant is the highest point in the Gamack Range of the Southern Alps, and it is located 17 kilometres east of Mount Cook Village in the Canterbury Region of the South Island. Precipitation runoff from the mountain's slopes drains into tributaries of the Jollie River. Topographic relief is significant as the south face rises 1,000 metres (3,281 feet) in one kilometre. The nearest higher peak is Abbess, four kilometres to the northwest. This mountain's toponym was applied by Thomas Burnett to honour William Grant (1843–1910), New Zealand shepherd, livestock dealer, and landowner. This mountain's toponym has been officially approved by the New Zealand Geographic Board.

== Climate ==
Based on the Köppen climate classification, Mount William Grant is located in a marine west coast (Cfb) climate zone, with a subpolar oceanic climate (Cfc) at the summit. Prevailing westerly winds blow moist air from the Tasman Sea onto the mountains, where the air is forced upward by the mountains (orographic lift), causing moisture to drop in the form of rain or snow. The months of December through February offer the most favourable weather for viewing or climbing this peak.

== Climbing ==
Climbing routes with first ascents:

- East Ridge – Mark Flintoft, Lee Burberry – (2015)
- North Face – Troy Forsyth, Ruari Macfarlane – (2023)

== See also ==
- List of mountains of New Zealand by height
