= Bill Grant (Australian footballer) =

Australian rules footballer

Personal information
- Full name: Bill Grant
- Born: 1 December 1882
- Died: 1 January 1947 (aged 64)
- Original team: Bulla
- Height: 178 cm (5 ft 10 in)
- Weight: 81 kg (179 lb)

Playing career^{1}
Years	Club	Games (Goals)
1906	Carlton	2 (0)
- ^{1} Playing statistics correct to the end of 1906.

Bill Grant (1 December 1882 – 1 January 1947) was an Australian rules footballer who played with Carlton in the Victorian Football League (VFL).
