= Samuel McGuffin =

Irish politician

Samuel McGuffin MP

Member of Parliament for Belfast Shankill
- In office 1918–1922

Member of the Northern Ireland Parliament for Belfast
- In office 1921–1925

Personal details
- Born: 1863
- Died: November 21, 1952
- Party: Labour Unionist

Samuel McGuffin (1863 – 21 November 1952) was Labour Unionist Member of Parliament (MP) for Belfast Shankill in the Parliament of the United Kingdom from 1918 to 1922, and Ulster Unionist MP in the Parliament of Northern Ireland for Belfast North from 1921 to 1925.

Parliament of the United Kingdom
New constituency	Member of Parliament for Belfast Shankill; 1918–1922	Constituency abolished
Parliament of Northern Ireland
New constituency	Member of Parliament for Belfast North; 1921–1929; With: William Grant; Lloyd Campbell; Robert McKeown	Succeeded by William Grant; Sam Kyle; Lloyd Campbell; Tommy Henderson
