= Belfast North (Northern Ireland Parliament constituency) =

- Former Borough constituency for the Parliament of Northern Ireland
- Belfast North shown within Northern Ireland

Former constituency
- Created: 1921
- Abolished: 1929
- Election method: Single transferable vote

Belfast North was a borough constituency of the Parliament of Northern Ireland from 1921 to 1929. It returned four MPs, using proportional representation by means of the single transferable vote.

== Boundaries ==
Belfast North was created by the Government of Ireland Act 1920 and contained the Clifton, Duncairn and Shankill wards of the County Borough of Belfast. The House of Commons (Method of Voting and Redistribution of Seats) Act (Northern Ireland) 1929 divided the constituency into four constituencies elected under first past the post: Belfast Clifton, Belfast Duncairn, Belfast Oldpark and Belfast Shankill constituencies.

== Second Dáil ==
In May 1921, Dáil Éireann, the parliament of the self-declared Irish Republic run by Sinn Féin, passed a resolution declaring that elections to the House of Commons of Northern Ireland and the House of Commons of Southern Ireland would be used as the election for the Second Dáil. All those elected were on the roll of the Second Dáil, but as no Sinn Féin MP was elected for Belfast North, it was not represented there.

== Politics ==
Belfast North was a predominantly Unionist area with considerable pockets of labour strength. It returned four Unionists in 1921, but in 1925, it returned only two official Unionists, plus one independent Unionist and a Labour member.

== Members of Parliament ==
Election	Member (Party)	Member (Party)	Member (Party)	Member (Party)
MPs (1921)	Lloyd Campbell (Ulster Unionist Party)	Samuel McGuffin (Ulster Unionist Party)	William Grant (Ulster Unionist Party)	Robert McKeown (Ulster Unionist Party)
MPs (1925)	Lloyd Campbell (Ulster Unionist Party)	Tommy Henderson (Independent Unionist)	William Grant (Ulster Unionist Party)	Sam Kyle (Northern Ireland Labour Party)

== Election results ==
24 May 1921 General Election: Belfast North (4 seats)
Party	Candidate	FPv%	Count		
Party	Candidate	FPv%	1	2	3
UUP	Lloyd Campbell	32.3	12,875		
UUP	Samuel McGuffin	29.1	11,596		
UUP	William Grant	15.4	6,148	9,880	
UUP	Robert McKeown	8.9	3,562	4,676	8,263
Sinn Féin	Michael Carolan	8.1	3,235	3,268	3,275
Nationalist	F. P. Harkin	3.8	1,509	1,516	1,519
Independent	J. B. Wallace	2.3	926	944	972
Electorate: 43,194 Valid: 39,851 Quota: 7,971 Turnout: 92.3%

1925 General Election: Belfast North (4 seats)
Party	Candidate	FPv%	Count			
Party	Candidate	FPv%	1	2	3	4
Ind. Unionist	Tommy Henderson	30.7	10,306			
UUP	William Grant	19.7	6,610	6,934		
NI Labour	Sam Kyle	17.6	5,915	7,650		
UUP	Lloyd Campbell	16.1	5,421	5,952	6,163	7,026
UUP	John William Nixon	12.1	4,068	4,951	5,471	6,021
UUP	H. T. Whitaker	3.8	1,276	1,389	1,481	
Electorate: 47,228 Valid: 33,596 Quota: 6,720 Turnout: 71.1%
