= Lloyd Campbell (politician) =

Lloyd Campbell (1868–1950) was a Northern Ireland business executive and politician.

Campbell was educated at Overslade preparatory school in England, Wellington College and Queen's College, Belfast. He became managing director of Henry Campbell & Co., the family flax spinning business in Belfast. He was married in 1895 to Ina Valentine of Jordanstown, Co Antrim, the daughter of a merchant; their daughter Hilda was born in November 1897. In 1908, he had a house, "Fairbourne", built to a design by Vincent Craig, in Belfast's Fitzwilliam Park.

In 1921 Campbell was elected as Ulster Unionist Party candidate to the Stormont Parliament, for the Belfast North constituency, and kept his seat to 1929. He died on 20 February 1950.
