= Robert McKeown =

Robert John McKeown (12 May 1869 – 9 April 1925) was an Irish businessman and Ulster Unionist Party politician.

Born in Coagh, County Tyrone, he was educated privately and was a director of a linen manufacturing company. From 1914 - 1920 he was chairman of the Irish Power Loom Manufacturers' Association and a member of the Flax Control Board during the First World War. In 1920 he was president of the Ulster Reform Club, and chairman of the Ulster Liberal Unionist Association in 1921.

He was a Stormont MP for North Belfast from 1921 until his death in 1925, and served as Parliamentary Secretary to both the Ministry for Education and Ministry for Commerce during that time.

Parliament of Northern Ireland
New constituency	Member of Parliament for North Belfast; 1921–1925	Succeeded by Sam Kyle
Political offices
New office	Parliamentary Secretary to the Ministry of Commerce; 1921–1925	Vacant
New office	Parliamentary Secretary to the Ministry of Education; 1921–1925	Succeeded by John Hanna Robb
