= 1878 Leith Burghs by-election =

UK parliamentary by-election

The 1878 Leith Burghs by-election was fought on 29 January 1878. The by-election was fought due to the resignation of the incumbent Liberal MP, Donald Robert Macgregor. It was won by the Liberal candidate Andrew Grant.
