= Ronald Munro Ferguson, 1st Viscount Novar =

British politician and colonial administrator

The Right Honourable The Viscount Novar KT, GCMG, PC
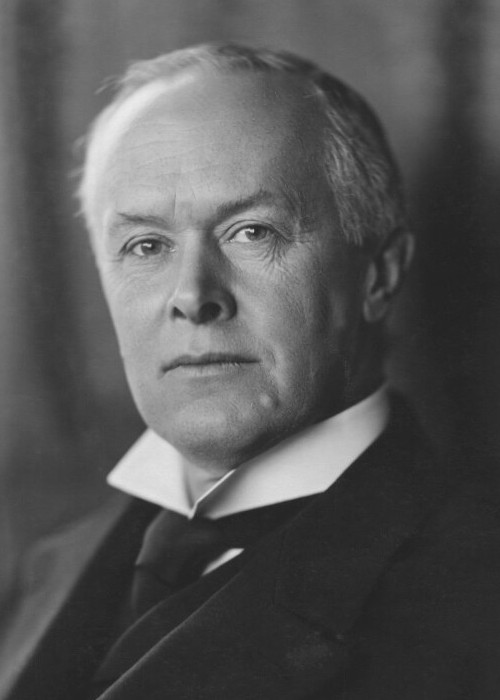
- Ferguson c. 1910s

6th Governor-General of Australia
- In office 18 May 1914 – 6 October 1920
- Monarch: George V
- Prime Minister: Joseph Cook; Andrew Fisher; Billy Hughes
- Preceded by: Lord Denman
- Succeeded by: Lord Forster

Secretary for Scotland
- In office 24 October 1922 – 22 January 1924
- Prime Minister: Bonar Law; Stanley Baldwin
- Preceded by: Robert Munro
- Succeeded by: William Adamson

Member of Parliament for Leith Burghs
- In office 21 August 1886 – 1 February 1914
- Preceded by: William Ewart Gladstone; Never took seat
- Succeeded by: George Welsh Currie

Member of Parliament for Ross and Cromarty
- In office 11 August 1884 – 19 December 1885
- Preceded by: Sir Alexander Matheson, Bt
- Succeeded by: Roderick Macdonald

Personal details
- Born: 6 March 1860 Kirkcaldy, Fife, Scotland
- Died: 30 March 1934 (aged 74) Kirkcaldy, Fife, Scotland
- Party: Liberal
- Spouse: Helen Hamilton-Temple-Blackwood (m. 1889)

Ronald Craufurd Munro Ferguson, 1st Viscount Novar (6 March 1860 – 30 March 1934) was a British politician who served as the sixth governor-general of Australia, in office from 1914 to 1920.

Munro Ferguson was born in Kirkcaldy, Fife, Scotland. He attended the Royal Military College, Sandhurst, and initially pursued a military career. Munro Ferguson was elected to the House of Commons in 1884, defeated a year later, and re-elected in 1886. A Liberal Imperialist, he was an ally of Lord Rosebery and served as a Junior Lord of the Treasury in his government. Munro Ferguson was overlooked for ministerial office by Henry Campbell-Bannerman and H. H. Asquith, but in 1914 was appointed Governor-General of Australia. He was politically influential, forming a close bond with Prime Minister Billy Hughes, and was committed to his role as nominal commander-in-chief during World War I. His six years in office was a record until being surpassed by another wartime governor-general, Lord Gowrie. Munro Ferguson was raised to the viscountcy once his term ended, and from 1922 to 1924, returned to politics as Secretary of State for Scotland under Bonar Law and Stanley Baldwin. In retirement he held various company directorships.

== Background and education ==
Munro Ferguson was born Ronald Craufurd Ferguson at his family home of Raith House near Kirkcaldy, Fife, Scotland, the son and eldest child of Lieutenant-Colonel Robert Ferguson, a wealthy member of the Commons of old Scottish descent. His mother was Emma Eliza, daughter of James Henry Mandeville of Merton, Surrey. He was a grandson of General Richard C. Ferguson. In 1864, his father inherited the baronies of Novar in Ross-shire and Muirton in Morayshire, and took the additional surname Munro.

Educated at the Royal Military College, Sandhurst, he pursued a military career until 1884. Ferguson joined the 1st Fife Light Horse in 1875: a militia regiment of gentlemen. Three years later, he entered RMA Sandhurst. On the officer's course for a year, he was gazetted to the Grenadier Guards with a commission. He served in the army for a short service limited commission, leaving in 1884 on returning from India. Ferguson joined the Oswald of Dunnikier Lodge 468 on 24 December 1888.

== Political life, 1884–1914 ==
Ronald Munro Ferguson c1895

In 1884, Munro Ferguson was elected to the House of Commons, but was defeated at the general election of November 1885 by a Crofter candidate in Ross and Cromarty. One historian had accused him of scheming with the Duke of Argyll to corrupt the electoral process. He was defeated again the following year in Dunbartonshire. But at a by-election in July 1886 he secured the nomination at Leith Burghs, principally on the advice of Lord Rosebery. Gladstone had won two unopposed seats but, on refusing Leith to prevent a suspected Unionist Michael Jacks, it became vacant. In August a by-election was held and Home Rule candidate Munro Ferguson was elected.

Gladstone appointed him private secretary to Lord Rosebery, a leading Liberal. Like Rosebery, Munro Ferguson would become a Liberal Imperialist, and a personal friend of the colourful earl. He accompanied Rosebery and his wife, Hannah, on a tour of India in 1886-7 and again in 1892-4. When Rosebery became prime minister, Ferguson was promoted in the Treasury department as a junior whip with responsibilities for Scotland. Ferguson continued to urge radicalism to bring Home Rule for Scotland on his friend, whom he supported in 1887 for the Liberal Party leadership.

He supported the imperial policies of the Conservative government during the Second Boer War, which made him highly unpopular with the radical, anti-war wing of the Liberal Party. Matters came to a head when he was threatened by Grey in a letter on 18 October 1900. The Liberals had lost another general election to the 'Khaki' Conservatives and so Ferguson disgusted by the derision and division "chucked it" in resigning as Scottish whip. A member of the Liberal Imperialist Council, he was disaffected by the bad treatment of his mentor Rosebery. Nonetheless, he was compelled to work with 'Limps', derisively dubbed by republicans, on "lines of speeches" for "the Asquith Committee" which now controlled the party's Imperialist wing now renamed The Liberal League. Grey, Haldane and the rest seized control of the organization and its administration: the preface to which was Rosebery's remarkable volte face over the South African War, leaving his friend forced to admit to Munro Ferguson "should an Asquith Government be formed he might go abroad."

He, therefore, had little hope of Cabinet office in the governments of Campbell-Bannerman or Asquith, despite his obvious talents. In December 1905, he requested the new Liberal cabinet make him Governor of Bombay but was refused. Instead, he had to be content with provost of Kirkcaldy. He nursed a burning resentment against "over genial" plebeian Asquith. Increasingly, his job in government and liaison of his group had been taken over by R B Haldane when he made it clear in 1907 his decided opposition "to keep Asquith out of the leadership....He has come to be quite unreliable...." But "the political disaster" that he called Asquith's succession made his political career untenable. He was a property owner in Asquith's constituency, a neighbour of Haldane, and just like him had gained the patronage of Lord Morley; they were idealists for social reform.

== Governor-General of Australia, 1914–1920 ==
In February 1914, therefore, Munro Ferguson was happy to accept the post of Governor-General of Australia (he had refused the governorship of South Australia in 1895 and that of Victoria in 1910). He was appointed a Knight Grand Cross of the Order of St Michael and St George (GCMG) prior to his appointment on 18 May 1914. His political background, his connections with the Liberal government in London and his imperialist views made him both better equipped and more inclined to play an activist role in Australian politics than any of his predecessors. At the same time, he had enough sense to confine his activism to behind the scenes influence. He was described as an active Imperial supervisor by the journalist, Keith Murdoch, using his own cipher to signal London.

During the First World War, which broke out in August 1914, the reciprocal power of the Australian High Commission in London was severely restricted and Government House had a furious falling out with the then Governor of New South Wales, Sir Gerald Strickland. They grew to hate one another and the latter was jealous of Melbourne's superior power and location of governance. The British Government underfunded the federal government and ignored the huge debts spent by State Governors on public works but it was the most active government since federation; and Munro-Ferguson its most active ambassador.

He developed close friendships with two judges of the High Court of Australia: Sir Samuel Griffith (the Chief Justice, and former Premier of Queensland) and Sir Edmund Barton (former Prime Minister of Australia). He consulted Griffith and Barton on many occasions, including on the exercise of the reserve powers of the Crown.

=== Strickland ===
Although 'a genial host and brilliant controversialist', Sir Gerald Strickland 'his tactlessness caused some uneasiness'. The new Governor-General found himself in a struggle over precedence. The post of New South Wales Governor was the oldest in Australia and had long been considered the most powerful. But, by law, the royal appointment to Government House held sway. During the First World War, the strain began to show in the London Liberal government. Ferguson was desperate to keep secrecy, and maintain control over policy access to London. On 3 June 1916, the Colonial Secretary informed Ferguson that a coalition was pending. Strickland, having snubbed the Government in Melbourne, went over the Governor-General's head directly to London. Strickland worked up an ANZAC day annual memorial, which proved very popular – but which Strickland claimed was a national celebration. On 1 May 1917, Munro Ferguson confessed to Lord Stamfordham that he had under-estimated the deep emotional loyalty of ordinary Australians. Press belief that Anzacs were the spearhead elite and shocktroops among dominions gave a status in the British Empire's armies they sustained throughout the war.

=== Australian federal election, 1914 ===
It was advantageous that Munro Ferguson was politically experienced because he arrived in Melbourne, then the site of the Parliament of Australia, to find himself in the midst of a political crisis. The Liberal government of Joseph Cook had a one-seat majority in the House of Representatives, but the Labor Party had a majority in the Senate and had used it systematically to frustrate the government. Cook was now determined to force a double dissolution election under Section 57 of the Constitution.

On 2 June 1914, barely three weeks after Munro Ferguson had taken office, Cook formally requested a double dissolution. Munro Ferguson had several things to consider. The Parliament elected in 1913 still had two years to run. Cook had not been defeated in the House of Representatives. His sole reason for wanting a dissolution was that he did not control the Senate. This was a situation without precedent in the United Kingdom, where the upper house, the House of Lords, is unelected.

When Munro Ferguson granted Cook a double dissolution, he was furiously denounced by the Labor Party: who maintained that Cook was manipulating the Constitution to gain control of the Senate. Munro Ferguson, influenced by the British House of Lords crisis of 1910, took the view that the lower house should prevail. Paradoxically, it was Cook's Liberal Party who argued that the Governor-General should always take the advice of his prime minister, while Labor argued that he should exercise his discretion.

In the middle of the campaign for the 1914 election, news arrived of the outbreak of the First World War. This caused an acute crisis in Australian government. Parliament had been dissolved and the government was in caretaker mode. Furthermore, Australia in 1914 did not have the right to independent participation in international affairs, and so its politicians were completely inexperienced in such.

In these circumstances, Munro Ferguson was the only man with both the constitutional authority and the confidence to act. It was he who convened the Cabinet, implemented the mobilisation plan and communicated with the Cabinet in London. Cook's manoeuvring backfired when Labor won the September election and Andrew Fisher was returned to office.

=== Australia at war ===
The Inspector-General William Bridges was given the task of creating an expeditionary force of 20,000 men. Bridges and General White admired the fact that George Pearce, the Minister for Defence in 1914, had been already converted by the 1911 Imperial Defence Conference to a British world view. There was to be one Corps, this led to a second Australian Corps, and even the possibility of a full army recruited solely from Australia. In 1914, Bridges was replaced by the British Indian Army General William Birdwood.

Munro-Ferguson was an enthusiastic supporter of Australian soldiers. He indicated to Colonial Secretary Bonar Law, that General Hamilton had made tactless remarks about officer's class breeding during the Dardanelles campaign. Yet Bonar Law had earlier mentioned Hamilton's praise for the Australians by letter on 24 Aug 1915. Winston Churchill did not help when hinting 'wastage' could be made up from former wounded Australians, and communicating the idea to Munro-Ferguson. A journalist Keith Murdoch tried to take documents from the imperial base at Egypt to London, to meet PM Asquith and Lord Northcliffe of The Times. He was intercepted en route by British intelligence, under orders from General Hamilton. Bonar Law remained critical of the policy and joined David Lloyd George to bring about a Coalition.

Billy Hughes was the driving force behind the war effort and the policy of conscription. The incoming Labor Premier formed a close relationship with Munro Ferguson, who recognised his ability. Munro Ferguson saw his role in wartime as an agent of the British war effort, not just a representative of the Crown. He openly supported those who were committed to the war, and opposed those who were not. Munro-Ferguson sent secret memos to London.

Against the advice, he warned New Zealand against German cruiser Emden. In the Pacific, Japan were allies; but their naval expansionary plans worried. The Colonial Secretary adopted a policy similar to Conservative Sir Stafford Northcote, Governor-General (1904–8). Munro Ferguson was actively travelling the country reviewing troops, meeting dignitaries, and seeing munitions factories. Through an active correspondence with General Birdwood, his influence was felt over senior military appointments. His authority firmly stamped on the Dominion, he favoured Gen Brudenell White over Gen Monash, the eventual commander of AIF.

In October 1915, Fisher resigned and was succeeded as prime minister by Hughes. Munro Ferguson recognised Hughes's qualities as a war leader and supported him privately and publicly, in a way that stretched constitutional propriety. Hughes was convinced that only the introduction of conscription would allow Australia to maintain its commitment to the war effort and Munro Ferguson gave him every encouragement. Hughes' answer was to call-up 50,000 more men – but without planning ahead. Hughes refused to call a debate in the Federal parliament.

Munro Ferguson regarded the defeat of the conscription plebiscites in October 1916 and December 1917 as disasters for Australia and the war effort. He also believed that the British Empire needed an integrationist bluewater policy that mixed Canadian and British troops with Australians in the regimental system. The Governor made it clear that the war was simply and justly a big fight: The absence of carping here over the premature bombardment, and the postponed list casualties is beyond all praise, he wrote of the ANZAC at Gallipoli. In Munro-Ferguson's opinion the press was a victim of hyperbole on Australian soldiers: big-noting ...tale of heroism that thrilled the world.

When Hughes was expelled from the Labor Party after the first plebiscite, Munro Ferguson allowed him to stay in office as a minority prime minister, supported by Cook's Liberals. He encouraged Hughes and Cook to form a new party on a "win the war" platform. This party, the Nationalist Party, was formed later in 1916 with Hughes as leader and Cook as deputy leader. During the second plebiscite campaign, Hughes pledged to resign if it were not carried. The plebiscite lost, and Hughes followed through on his promise to resign. However, there were no alternative candidates, and Munro Ferguson used his reserve power to promptly recommission Hughes — thus allowing Hughes to stay in office while fulfilling his promise to stand down.

When David Lloyd George became prime minister in Britain, Hughes communicated directly with him (sometimes in Welsh), causing Munro Ferguson to complain that he was being denied his proper role as the medium of communication between London and Melbourne. Despite Munro Ferguson's vigorous assertion of his rights as Governor-General, he could not in the long run halt the decline in the influence of the office.

Once Australia gained the right to independent participation in international affairs, which it did in 1918, Munro Ferguson's days of influence were over.

Alone among the Dominion forces, the Defence Force Act 1903 (Cth) reserved the power to confirm a death sentence passed by Australian courts-martial not to the commander-in-chief of the theatre, but to the Governor-General of Australia. Munro Ferguson refused to confirm the sentence on any of the 113 Australian soldiers condemned by courts-martial.

== Post-war ==
After the war, trade was restored with Britain, but protectionist and isolationists Conservative policies threatened the Liberal Imperialist vision of unity. In May 1919, Munro Ferguson advised London of his desire to resign. He was pressed to stay on to oversee the Australian tour of the Prince of Wales in 1920. Ferguson left Australia as her most successful Governor-General to date. Australia had played an integral and significant military role in supporting the imperial war effort, but Hughes continued to disrupt imperial unity: the people were now calling for more democracy. He finally departed in October 1920, after more than six years in post.

On his return home, he was raised to the peerage as Viscount Novar, of Raith in the County of Fife and of Novar in the County of Ross on 6 December, named for Novar House, Raith which was the ancestral seat of the Ferguson family. The Liberal PM Lloyd George appointed Novar to be vice-President of the Committee of Council of Education. He was a close political friend of Sir Edward Grey, and took an active part in the business of the Lords. As Vice-President of the Council on Education he was responsible for oversight in 1922.

=== Later career ===
On the collapse of the Coalition, he was adopted by another Scot, Bonar Law, who made Novar Secretary of State for Scotland. Following an official ceremony, he received the Freedom of Edinburgh in 1923; he took an interest in the history and traditions of his homeland. After the brief interlude of the Labour government he left the Scottish office, and was appointed as Chairman of the Political Honours Committee. Whereas in Scotland he became a Member of the Royal Commission on the Ancient and Historical Monuments of Scotland and Construction. He remained a Liberal under the new leadership, and was invited to the Board of Trust of National Liberals of Scotland. Taking on directorships he was Chairman of the North British and Mercantile Insurance Company. He was a Director of the Rail Passengers Insurance Company, and of the Union Bank of Scotland: executive posts he held until his death. Novar was granted further honours when he was appointed a Knight of the Thistle (KT) in 1926.

== Personal life and death ==
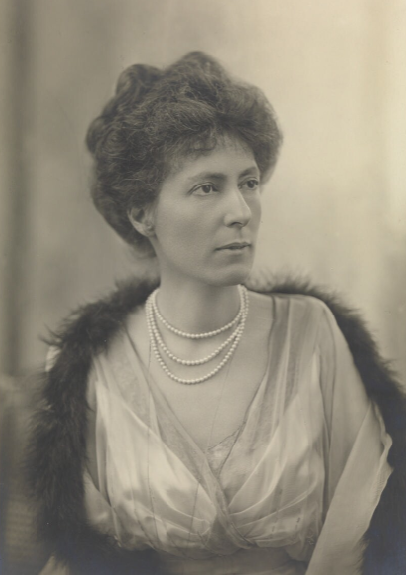
Lady Helen Munro Ferguson during the First World War

Lord Novar married Lady Helen Hermione (1863 – 9 April 1941), daughter of Lord Dufferin, in 1889. The union was childless. They lived at 18 Portman Square, when in London. He was a member of the Athenaeum Club and Reform Club.

Lady Novar's work for the British Red Cross Society, which included converting the ballroom of Melbourne's Government House for this purpose, earned her appointment as a Dame Grand Cross of the Order of the British Empire (GBE) in 1918.

Lord Novar died at his home on 30 March 1934, aged 74, the title Viscount Novar dying with him as he left no issue. The titles Baron of Novar and Baron of Muirton became dormant. His papers are an extremely important source for historians of Australian politics and Australia's role in the First World War. He was a close friend of Sir Cecil Spring Rice, with whom he corresponded for many years. Lady Novar died in 1941.

== Legacy ==
- Novar Gardens, South Australia were named in 1921 in honour of Viscount Novar.
- A Sydney Harbour ferry, Lady Ferguson (built 1914), was named after Lady Novar, as a continuation of a naming convention whereby ferries were named after wives of Governors-General of Australia and Governors of NSW.

== Arms ==
Coat of arms of Sir Ronald Craufurd Munro-Ferguson
Crest A demi-lion proper holding between the paws a buckle gules. Escutcheon Argent, a lion rampant azure, between three buckles gules, a chief chequy of the first and second. Supporters Dexter, an emu, sinister, an eagle, both proper. Motto Virtutis fortuna comes (Fortune is the companion of virtue) Other versions Full achievements:

Parliament of the United Kingdom
Preceded by Sir Alexander Matheson, Bt	Member of Parliament for Ross and Cromarty; 1884–1885	Succeeded by Roderick Macdonald
Preceded by William Ewart Gladstone	Member of Parliament for Leith Burghs; 1886–1914	Succeeded by George Welsh Currie
Government offices
Preceded by The Lord Denman	Governor-General of Australia; 1914–1920	Succeeded by The Lord Forster
Political offices
Preceded by Robert Munro	Secretary for Scotland; 1922–1924	Succeeded by William Adamson
Peerage of the United Kingdom
New creation	Viscount Novar; 1920–1934	Extinct
