= Ralph Spence =

Ralph Spence may refer to:

- Ralph Spence (bishop) (born 1942), Canadian bishop
- Ralph Spence (screenwriter) (1890–1949), American screenwriter
- Ralph Spence (trade unionist) (1869–1938), British trade union leader
