= Naul =

Naul or NAUL may refer to:

- Naul, County Dublin, a village in north County Dublin, Ireland
- Naul (singer) (born 1978), South Korean soul singer, member of Brown Eyed Soul
- National Amalgamated Union of Labour, in the United Kingdom

== See also ==
- Willie Naulls, American basketball player
