= Donald Macgregor =

Donald Macgregor may refer to:

- Donald Macgregor (athlete) (1939–2020), Scottish athlete at the 1972 summer Olympics
- Donald Robert Macgregor (1824–1889), Scottish politician, Member of Parliament for Leith Burghs 1874–1878
- Donald MacGregor (Liberal MP) (1839–1911), Liberal Member of Parliament for Inverness-shire 1892–1895

== See also ==
- Donald Morris McGregor (1923–2003), Canadian politician
- Don McGregor (born 1945), American comic book writer
