= 1914 Leith Burghs by-election =

UK parliamentary by-election

- 26 February 1914

Candidate	Currie	Smith	Bell
Party	Unionist	Liberal	Labour
Popular vote	5,159	5,143	3,346
Percentage	37.8%	37.7%	24.5%
MP before election
Ferguson
Liberal
Subsequent MP
Benn
Liberal

The 1914 Leith Burghs by-election was a Parliamentary by-election held on 20 February 1914. The constituency returned one Member of Parliament (MP) to the House of Commons of the United Kingdom, elected by the first past the post voting system.

== Vacancy ==
Munro Ferguson had been the Liberal MP for Leith Burghs since 1886 when he succeeded William Gladstone. In February 1914, he was appointed to the post of Governor-General of Australia and thus resigned his seat.

== Electoral history ==
This was the result at the last election;

Ferguson

General election December 1910
Party	Candidate	Votes	%	±%
Liberal	Ronald Munro Ferguson	7,069	57.2	+7.6
Liberal Unionist	Frederick Alexander Macquisten	5,284	42.8	+11.3
Majority		1,785	14.4	−3.7
Turnout		12,353	68.7	−14.3
Liberal hold		Swing	-9.5	

The result of the previous election is worth noting because it was a three-way contest;

General election January 1910
Party	Candidate	Votes	%	±%
Liberal	Ronald Munro Ferguson	7,146	49.6	−11.6
Liberal Unionist	Robert Cranston	4,540	31.5	−7.3
Labour	William Walker	2,724	18.9	New
Majority		2,606	18.1	−4.3
Turnout		14,410	83.0	+9.1
Liberal hold		Swing		

== Candidates ==
Bell

- Malcolm Smith was chosen as the Liberal candidate to defend the seat. A local businessman, he became the Provost of Leith in 1908.
- George Welsh Currie was chosen as the Unionist candidate. He had been born and raised in Edinburgh.
- William Walker the previous Labour candidate had taken a job as a Civil Servant which precluded him from standing for parliament. Joseph Nicholas Bell was chosen by the Labour Party as their candidate. He was sponsored by the National Amalgamated Union of Labour.

== Campaign ==
Labour's intervention was expected to hurt the Liberals, but there was evidence that they might still win a three-way contest; Although Labour had not stood here last time, a Labour candidate had contested the January 1910 general election, finishing third and polling 18.9%.

Although Bell was a moderate in Labour Party terms, his campaign was run by extreme Socialists. Bell explained his position by stating he was a Socialist and he was selected by the working class bodies of Leith. The Seamans Union Leader Havelock Wilson visited the constituency to speak in support of the Liberal candidate and was involved in an exchange with the Socialist Emmanuel Shinwell who sought court action for alleged slander with £1,000 for damages.

== Result ==
The Unionists gained the seat from the Liberals.

Currie

Leith Burghs by-election, 1914
Party	Candidate	Votes	%	±%
Unionist	George Welsh Currie	5,159	37.8	−5.0
Liberal	Malcolm Smith	5,143	37.7	−19.5
Labour	Joseph Nicholas Bell	3,346	24.5	New
Majority		16	0.1	N/A
Turnout		13,648	77.1	+8.4
Unionist gain from Liberal		Swing	+9.1	

- The change in vote share and swing are compared to the previous three-way contest in January 1910.

== Aftermath ==
A General election was due to take place by the end of 1915. By the summer of 1914, the following candidates had been adopted to contest that election. Due to the outbreak of war, the election never took place.

General election 1914/15: Leith Burghs
Party	Candidate	Votes	%	±%
Unionist	George Welsh Currie			
Liberal	Daniel Macaulay Stevenson			
Labour	Joseph Nicholas Bell			

The Leith Burghs seat was abolished and mainly replaced for the 1918 General election by Leith. Smith did not contest the 1918 General election but was elected MP for Orkney & Shetland in 1921. Bell became Labour's prospective candidate for the new seat of Leith but was replaced at the eleventh hour.

General election 14 December 1918: Leith
Party	Candidate	Votes	%	±%
Liberal	William Wedgwood Benn	10,338	46.6	
Unionist	George Welsh Currie	7,613	34.3	
Labour	Stanley Burgess	4,251	19.1	
Majority		2,725	12.3	
Turnout		22,202		
Liberal win (new seat)				

- Currie was the endorsed candidate of the Coalition Government.
