= Florence Harrison Bell =

British socialist and suffragist activist

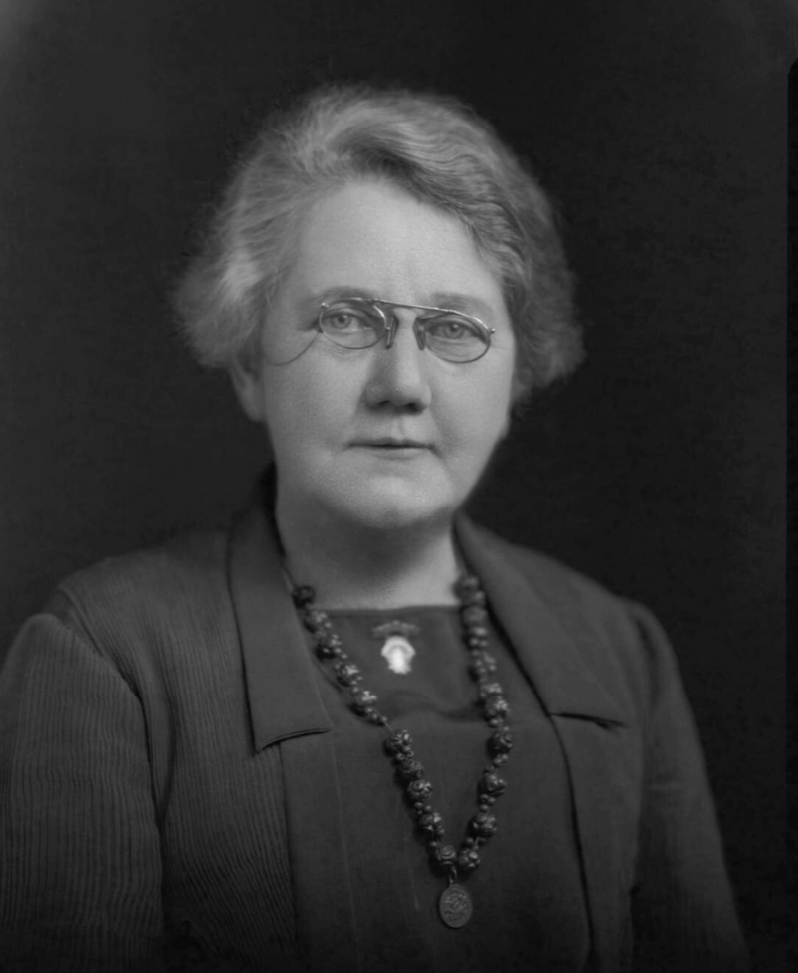
- Bell in 1929
- Born: September 8, 1865; Newcastle upon Tyne
- Died: October 8, 1948 (aged 83)
- Education: Armstrong College
- Occupations: Socialist and suffragist activist
- Spouse: Joseph Nicholas Bell

Florence Nightingale Harrison Bell (8 October 1865 – September 1948) was a British socialist and suffragist activist.

== Life ==
Born in Newcastle-upon-Tyne on 8 October 1865 as Florence Tait. She was the illegitimate daughter of Isabella Tait. At her baptism on 17 December at St. Andrew Newcastle she was recorded as Florence Harrison, her father was recorded as Thomas Latham Harrison (gentleman). After that she adopted the name Florence Latham Harrison. Her father, a Newcastle bookmaker, died when Florence was age two. She and her mother lived briefly in Scotland and then returned to North East England when her mother Isabella married Thomas Hedley Thompson, an engine fitter, at Gateshead Register Office on 30 October 1878. From that time Florence lived with her mother and stepfather in Gateshead and Newcastle.

She worked as a cook before studying at Armstrong College and becoming a teacher. At some time she adopted the name Florence Nightingale Harrison. Under that name in 1896, she married Joseph Nicholas Bell, general secretary of the National Amalgamated Union of Labour. She became active in the Independent Labour Party (ILP), and was the first woman to serve on its National Administrative Council (NAC). In 1898, she was replaced on the NAC by Emmeline Pankhurst. Through the ILP, she became active in the Labour Representation Committee (LRC), and was the first secretary of the Newcastle LRC.

In 1902, Bell became a director of the Newcastle Co-operative Society. By 1907, she was working as an organiser for the Women's Trade Union League. She was also active in the suffrage movement, holding membership of the National Union of Women's Suffrage Societies and served as secretary of its local affiliate, the North East Society for Women's Suffrage. In 1909, she stood down from the position, and the following year she became secretary of the local branch of the Women's Labour League.

Bell was elected to the executive of the Women's Labour League in 1913. In 1918, she was elected to the Labour Party's National Executive Committee as part of a league slate. She lost her seat the following year, but served again later in the decade.

She and her husband moved to North Finchley as they hoped that he would become an M.P. Her husband was elected as the Member of Parliament for Newcastle in 1922 but he died within a month of being elected. A local newspaper noted that he had been known as the husband of Florence Bell and speculated that Bell would clearly win if she stood for election. She did not stand.

In 1923, Bell was chair of the Standing Joint Committee of Women's Organisations. She remained active in the Labour Party, and stood in Luton at the 1929 UK general election, taking third place with 16.5% of the vote.

She died, age 83, on 8 September 1948. Following the production of a play about her life, in October 2019, Newcastle City Council erected a plaque in her memory on the house in Hotspur Street, in which she and her husband lived for around twenty years. It reads "Florence Nightingale Harrison Bell (1865-1948). Socialist, suffragist, tireless campaigner for healthcare, women's and children's rights. First Federal Secretary of the Independent Labour Party. Lived here 1901-1920." Only the second plaque to a woman in Newcastle (the first was Dr. Ethel Williams)
