= World War I conscription in Australia =

During the second half of World War I, the First Australian Imperial Force experienced a shortage of men as the number of men volunteering to fight overseas declined and the casualty rate increased. At the time, military service within the Commonwealth of Australia and its territories was compulsory for Australian men, but that requirement did not extend to conflict outside of Australia. In 1916, Prime Minister Billy Hughes called a plebiscite to determine public support for extending conscription to include military service outside the Commonwealth for the duration of the war. The referendum, held on 28 October 1916, narrowly rejected the proposal. A second plebiscite, held a year later on 20 December 1917, also failed (by a slightly larger margin) to gain a majority.

The referendums caused significant debate and division in Australian society, and within the government. Hughes called the first referendum against the advice of his own Labor government, which led to the Labor Party splitting, with Hughes and others forming a new National Labor Party.

== Conscription controversy ==
=== Commonwealth Defence Act 1909 ===
The Commonwealth Defence Act 1909 established that, from 1 January 1911, all males aged from 12 to 26 years of age would have to undergo compulsory military training for the defence of Australia. It did not require them to participate in any war overseas.

=== First conscription referendum (1916) ===
There was widespread opposition to this so-called "boy conscription", but the major conscription controversy began in 1916, after Prime Minister Billy Hughes had visited the war front. On his return to Australia, he declared his view that conscription was needed to supply the Australian forces with a sufficient number of soldiers.

Opposition to his proposal from within the governing Labor Party led Hughes to propose a plebiscite to decide the issue. The campaign surrounding the plebiscite deeply divided the nation, and meetings organised by the pro- and anti-conscription camps were attended by large crowds. Hughes' stand led to his expulsion from the Labor Electoral League of New South Wales during the campaign, and Labor's council for the West Sydney electorate, the area which Hughes had represented in state and federal parliaments since 1894, also voted for his expulsion.

The plebiscite, held on 28 October 1916, asked Australian voters:

Are you in favour of the Government having, in this grave emergency, the same compulsory powers over citizens in regard to requiring their military service, for the term of this War, outside the Commonwealth, as it now has in regard to military service within the Commonwealth?

The proposition was narrowly rejected, by a margin of 48.4% for and 51.6% against, reflecting a relatively small margin of 72,476 votes. Three states (Western Australia, Tasmania and Victoria) and the Federal Territory voted "Yes" and three (South Australia, New South Wales and Queensland) voted "No". Western Australia was by far the most pro-conscription polity, with 69.7% of voters voting "Yes". South Australia was the most anti-conscription state, with 57.6% voting "No".

=== Second conscription referendum (1917) ===
The result of the vote led to the collapse of the Hughes Labor government. The Labor Party split into two factions, with Hughes, and those Labor MPs who supported him, forming the breakaway National Labor Party. By February 1917, the National Labor Party had merged with the conservative Commonwealth Liberal Party to form the Nationalist Party of Australia, retaining Hughes as prime minister. Hughes and the Nationalists scored a convincing victory at the 1917 federal election.

In the light of that, and a significant decline in voluntary enlistments in 1916–17, Hughes decided to hold a second conscription plebiscite, which took place on 20 December 1917. The proposal was less sweeping than in 1916 – conscription would only occur in months in which voluntary enlistments fell below 7,000, and conscripts would be selected by a ballot of men aged between 18 and 44.

The plebiscite question was much simpler:

Are you in favour of the proposal of the Commonwealth government for reinforcing the Australian Imperial Force oversea [sic]?

The result was a slightly more decisive rejection of conscription than the year before, with 46% for and 54% against, a margin of 166,588 votes. Only Western Australia, Tasmania and the Federal Territory voted in favour.

== Public opinion ==
Prime Minister Billy Hughes hosted a referendum on the 22 October 1916. His campaign for conscription was supported by the major newspaper companies and other media. It was also supported by most of the Commonwealth Liberal Party including the Liberal state premiers, by the major Protestant churches and the Universal Service League, which had many prominent Australians were members. The result was that there were 1,087,557 votes in favour and 1,160,033 in opposition. The failed referendum led to Prime Minister Billy Hughes losing his seat in the Australian Labor Party.

=== Daniel Mannix ===
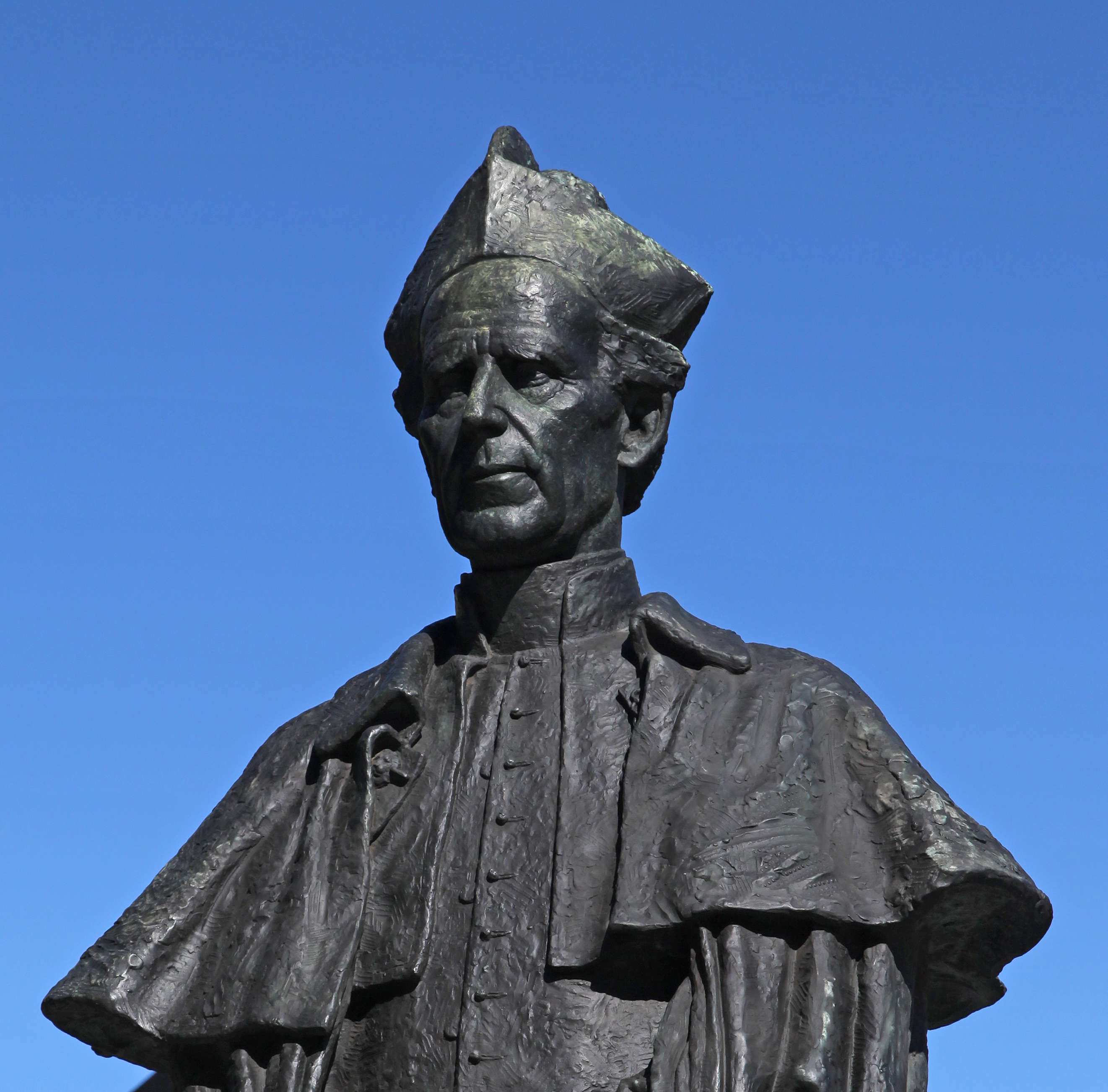
Statue of Daniel Mannix outside St Patrick's Cathedral, Melbourne

Daniel Patrick Mannix (4 March 1864 – 2 November 1963), Irish-born Australian Catholic archbishop, was one of Australia's biggest influences in the 20th century. He was extremely passionate about what he thought. During World War I, he stated that it was all "just an ordinary trade war"; for this line of thinking, he was denounced and even categorised as a traitor. He was one of the people who campaigned against Prime Minister Hughes when his referendum for conscription failed. He went through with his argument religiously, and, when the Labor Party split, he participated in supporting the Catholic side of the anti-conscription debate. Through this, he encouraged the political endeavours of James Scullin, Frank Brennan, Joseph Lyons and, later, Arthur Calwell.

=== Billy Hughes ===
Hughes was the Prime Minister in seat for the latter half of World War I. In 1917, he visited the war front. Hughes was a strong supporter of establishing Australia as a strong and significant country and thought that Australia's participation in World War I was in that case mandatory. In between July and August 1916, there was a loss of 28,000 men, and Generals Birdwood and White of the Australian Imperial Forces impressed upon Hughes that conscription was needed for Australia to continue impacting the war sufficiently. At this time, Hughes was the leader of the Labor Party. When he proposed the idea for conscription, two-thirds of his party disagreed with his views. Hughes, however, knew that he did not need to create a new law but could just amend the old one to include conscription via a democratic referendum. As a result, on 28 October 1916, an advisory referendum was held to decide whether the community of Australia supported conscription. The vote was rejected, and Hughes was sacked from the Labor Party. Hughes acted quickly to take his supporters in parliament and form the National Labor Party at the end of 1916. This enabled him to briefly form a government with the support of the Deakinite Liberal opposition. Early in 1917, the two then merged into the Nationalist Party of Australia and won the May election, with Hughes pledging to resign if again defeated at the plebiscite in December that year. The question was defeated by a yet greater margin this time, and Hughes honored his promise to resign—only to be reinstated as prime minister by the Governor General.

=== Women ===
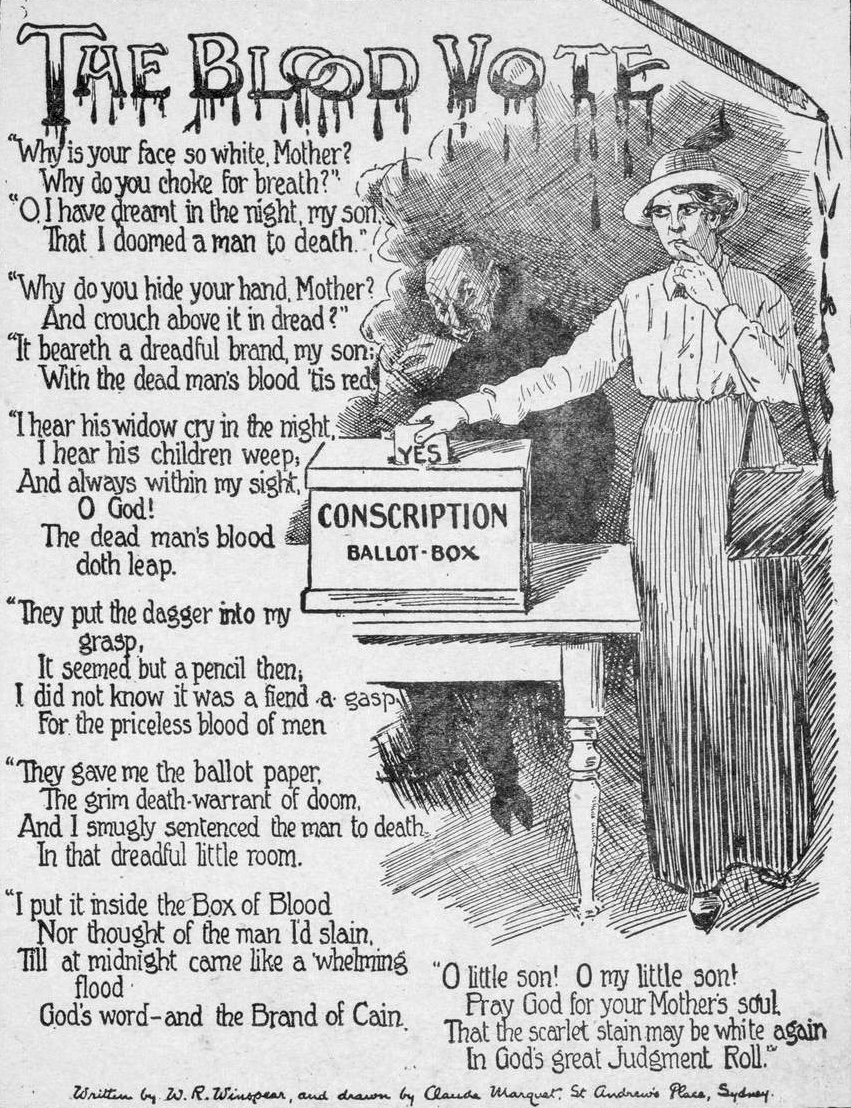
1917 Handbill - The Blood Vote

One the primary roles of women in conscription was in the recruiting and campaigns. They would often be on posters or in the posts. They would be positioned during this time as vulnerable, perhaps with children, and be made out to be weak, and therefore in need of protection. One quote from one photos even recounts, 'Any right—minded woman would rather be a mother or sister of a dead hero than of a living shirker.' Women during World War I were also a huge pacifist movement often going through great deals to hold out for peace. Once again, they portrayed themselves as wives, sisters, sweethearts or mothers.

Women at home would hold small or confectionery sales, such as sold buttons on button days, rattled collection boxes on collection days, organised fetes, baked cakes, put together 'comfort parcels' and, above all they knitted. Quite a few women looked to take a greater part in the more war related activities. This included nursing, drivers, interpreters and munitions workers.

== See also ==
- Conscription in Australia
- Compulsory military training in New Zealand
- Conscription Crisis of 1917 in Canada
- Recruitment to the British Army during the First World War

== Bibliography ==
- Encyclopædia Britannica- Macropedia Volume 21
- Encyclopædia Britannica- Macropedia Volume 12
