= Kent and Sussex Agricultural Labourers' Union =

Former trade union of the United Kingdom

The Kent and Sussex Agricultural Labourers' Union was a trade union representing farm workers in South East England.

== History ==
The union was founded in Maidstone in April 1872 as the Kent Agricultural Labourers' Union, inspired by the example of the Warwickshire Agricultural Labourers' Union. It was led by Alfred Simmons, editor of a local newspaper, which became the journal of the union. The union succeeded in raising labourers' wages from 10 shillings to 12 shillings, and eventually to 15 shillings. This success led it to grow rapidly, reaching 9,000 members in Kent alone by May 1873. In its early years, leading figures included Howard, representing East Kent, Neame, representing West Kent, G. Tapp, who led its Sussex District, and George Roots, its chairman. Howard, Neame, Simmons and Tapp all attended the March 1873 conference organised by the London Trades Council, which formed the Federal Union of Labourers. The Kent and Sussex union affiliated, but the federal union dissolved in 1875.

In 1875, the union became the Kent and Sussex Agricultural Labourers' Union. By 1877, it had 13,000 members, but immediately after the harvest had been taken in, farmers cut wages without notice. This led to a widespread lockout, but due to the time of year, the union was unable to sustain support. Simmons instead chartered a ship to New Zealand, so that affected families could choose to emigrate.

Despite the defeat of 1877, membership of the union remained buoyant. At the 1885 general election, Simmons stood for Parliament in St Augustine's, but was not elected. Three years later, he was "publicly disgraced", and in an effort to make a new start, the union was renamed as the London and Southern Counties Labour League, still retaining 8,500 members.

In 1891, the union's headquarters were relocated to London, and the union attempted to recruit nationally, becoming known as the London and Counties Labour League. The following year, its executive decided to start a pottery, leading complaints that this would be a distraction and drain on resources, with some branches resigning from the union. Despite this, by 1893, it had built up 2,000 members in eight London branches alone, but numbers then fell rapidly, and by late 1895, it had only a single London branch. Early in 1896, the union merged into the National Amalgamated Union of Labour.

== General Secretaries ==
1872: Alfred Simmons
1888: Charles Beale
1895: John Hyam
