= Nationalist Party (Australia) =

Former Australian political party

- Leader: Full list: Billy Hughes (1917–1923); Stanley Bruce (1923–1929); John Latham (1929–1931)
- Founder: Billy Hughes (Note: Hughes was largely claimed to be the founder of the Nationalist Party.)
- Founded: 15–22 February 1917
- Merger of: National Labor; Liberal
- Merged into: United Australia (1931)
- Youth wing: • Young National League; • Young Nationalists Organisation
- Women's wing: Women's National League
- Veterans' wing: RSSILA
- Ideology: Conservatism; Monarchism; Protectionism; Australian nationalism
- Political position: Centre-right to right-wing
- National affiliation: Nationalist–Country Coalition (1922–1931)
- Colours: Blue
- House of Representatives: 53 / 75 (1917–1919)
- Senate: 34 / 36 (1920–1923)

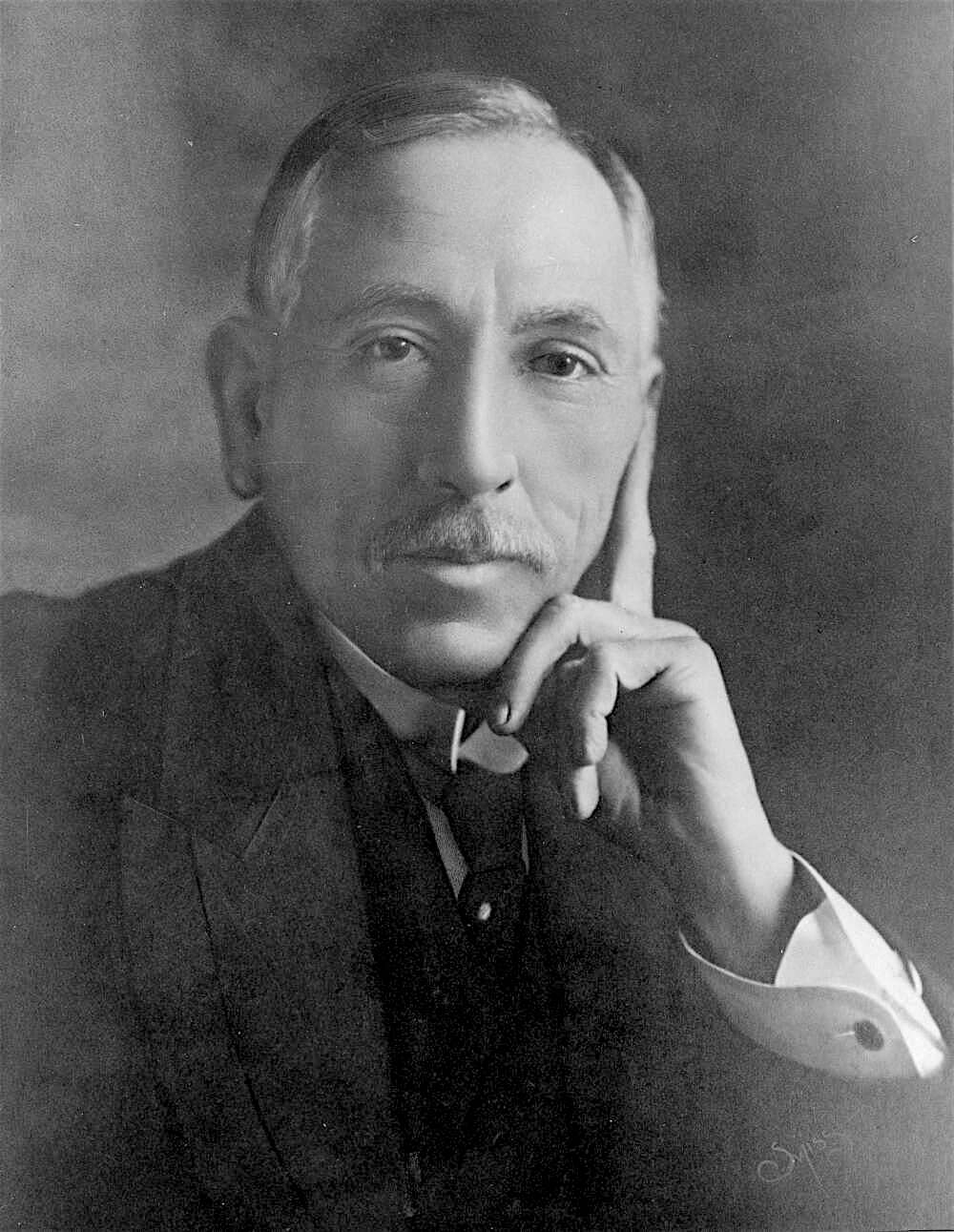
Billy Hughes, founder and Nationalist Prime Minister, 1917–23.

The Nationalist Party, also known as the National Party, was an Australian political party. It was formed in February 1917 from a merger between the Liberal Party and the National Labor Party, the latter formed by Prime Minister Billy Hughes and his supporters after the 1916 Labor Party split over World War I conscription. The Nationalist Party was established as a 'united' non-Labor opposition that had remained a political trend once the Labor party established itself in federal politics. The party was in government (from 1923 in coalition with the Country Party) until electoral defeat in 1929. From that time it was the main opposition to the Labor Party until it merged with pro-Joseph Lyons Labor defectors to form the United Australia Party (UAP) in 1931. The party is a direct ancestor of the Liberal Party of Australia, the main centre-right party in Australia.

== History ==
In October 1915, the Australian prime minister, Andrew Fisher of the Australian Labor Party, retired; Billy Hughes was chosen unanimously by the Labor caucus to succeed him. Hughes was a strong supporter of Australia's participation in World War I, and after a visit to Britain in 1916, where the Military Service Act 1916 had been passed earlier in the year, he became convinced that conscription was necessary if Australia was to sustain its contribution to the war effort. A majority of his party, most notably Roman Catholics and trade union representatives, was opposed to this, especially given the British government's reprisals against the Irish Easter Rising of 1916.

In October, Hughes held a plebiscite to try to gain approval for conscription, but the proposition was narrowly defeated. Daniel Mannix, the Catholic Archbishop of Melbourne, was his main opponent on the conscription issue. The defeat did not deter Hughes, who continued to vigorously argue in favour of conscription. This produced a deep and bitter split within the Australian public, as well as within his own party. The extent to which he engineered this split has been hotly debated ever since, and was even at the time regarded as ironic by many in the Labor movement, given Hughes' violent hostility to earlier Labor dissidents like Joseph Cook.

On 15 September 1916, the New South Wales executive of the Political Labour League (the Labor Party organisation at the time) expelled Hughes from the Labor Party. When the parliamentary Labor caucus met on 14 November 1916, lengthy discussions took place until Hughes walked out with 24 other Labor members. The remaining 43 members of the caucus then passed a motion of no confidence in the leadership, effectively expelling Hughes and his allies.

Hughes and his followers rebranded themselves as the "National Labor Party", and continued in office as a minority government with support from Cook and his Commonwealth Liberal Party. With the war dragging on, Hughes began negotiations with Cook to turn their confidence-and-supply agreement into formal party unity. That February, at the urging of the governor-general, Sir Robert Munro Ferguson, the two groups formally merged to form the Nationalist Party, with Hughes as leader and Cook as deputy leader. The new party was dominated by former Liberals, and as such was basically an upper- and middle-class party. However, the presence of many former Labor men—many of whom had been early leaders in that party—allowed the Nationalists to project an image of national unity.

In May 1917, the Nationalists won a huge electoral victory, and formed what was at the time the biggest majority government since Federation. The size of the landslide was magnified by the large number of Labor MPs who followed Hughes into the Nationalist Party. At this election Hughes abandoned his working-class division of West Sydney, and was elected for Bendigo in Victoria. He had promised to resign if his Government did not win the power to conscript. A second plebiscite on conscription was held in December 1917, but the proposition was again defeated, this time by a wider margin. Hughes, after receiving a vote of no confidence in his leadership by his party, resigned as prime minister. However, with no alternative candidates available, Ferguson used his reserve power to immediately re-commission Hughes as prime minister. Hughes was thus able to remain in office while having kept his promise to resign.

Hughes and the Nationalists were reelected almost as easily in 1919. They governed on their own until the elections of 1922, when the newly emerged Country Party gained the balance of power in the House of Representatives. The Nationalists had come up 12 seats short of a majority, and could only realistically hope for support from the Country Party. It was obvious that a confidence-and-supply agreement would not be enough to keep the Nationalists in office. However, the Country Party had never liked Hughes' rural policy, and its leader Earle Page let it be known that he would not serve under him. Several of the more conservative elements of the Nationalist Party had only tolerated Hughes after the war, suspecting he was still a socialist at heart. Page's demand finally gave them an excuse to dump Hughes, who was forced to resign in January 1923. Former treasurer Stanley Bruce was chosen as leader, and quickly entered into a coalition with the Country Party. The price, however, was high: five seats for the Country Party in cabinet (out of 11), with Page as treasurer and number-two man in the government. Such demands were unheard of for such a young party in a Westminster system. However, Bruce agreed to the terms rather than force another election. This was the start of the traditional coalition of non-Labor parties.

With the ouster of Hughes, the Nationalists took on a decidedly more conservative hue. Despite initial concerns that Australians wouldn't readily support the aloof Bruce, the Nationalist-Country Coalition won a great victory in the federal election of 1925. It was re-elected in 1928, though with a significantly reduced mandate. However, only a year later, Hughes led a group of backbenchers to cross the floor on a vote on Bruce's plans to reform the industrial arbitration system. In the subsequent election the Coalition was heavily defeated, suffering what was at the time the second-worst defeat of a sitting government since federation. Bruce even lost his own seat, and was succeeded as leader by former attorney-general John Latham.

The Nationalists were never a real force in Australian politics again. The party had spent its entire 12-year existence in government, and was ill-prepared for a role in opposition. In 1931, following negotiations with a group of Labor Party defectors led by Joseph Lyons, the Nationalist Party was absorbed into the new United Australia Party. Although the UAP was dominated by former Nationalists, Lyons was chosen as leader rather than Latham. The UAP replaced the Nationalists as the main non-Labor party.

The Western Australian branch retained the Nationalist name after the formation of the UAP, and did so until it and most of the major non-Labor parties were folded into the present-day Liberal Party of Australia.

== Young Nationalists Organisation ==
Around 1929, Robert Menzies, then a member of the Victorian Legislative Council, joined with Wilfrid Kent Hughes to form the Young Nationalists Organisation. Menzies was its first president.

The organisation kept its name when its parent party became part of the UAP. Half of the UAP members elected in the 1932 Victorian state election were Young Nationalists, almost trebling their parliamentary representation. The premier, Sir Stanley Argyle, included three of them in his eight-person cabinet, including Menzies as deputy premier.

Later, when Menzies founded the Liberal Party of Australia, he invited delegates from the Young Nationalists to attend. The Young Nationalists followed the UAP into the Liberal Party, and formed the nucleus of the new party's youth wing, the Young Liberals.

== Electoral performance ==
Election	Leader	Votes	%	Seats	+/–	Position	Government
1917	Billy Hughes	1,021,138	54.2	53 / 75	▲53	▲1st	Majority
1919	Billy Hughes	860,519	45.0	37 / 75	▼16	▲1st	Minority
1922	Billy Hughes	553,920	35.2	26 / 75	▼11	▼2nd	Coalition
1925	Stanley Bruce	1,238,397	42.4	37 / 75	▲11	▲1st	Coalition
1928	Stanley Bruce	1,014,522	39.0	29 / 75	▼8	▼2nd	Coalition
1929	Stanley Bruce	975,979	33.9	14 / 75	▼15	▼2nd	Opposition

== Leaders ==
No.	Leader (birth–death)	Portrait	Electorate	Took office	Left office	Duration of tenure	Prime Minister (term)
1	Billy Hughes (1862–1952)		West Sydney, NSW (Note: From 1901 to the federal election, May 1917.); Bendigo, Vic. (Note: Between 1917–1922.); North Sydney, NSW (Note: From 1922 onward.)	17 February 1917	2 February 1923	5 years and 351 days	Himself (1915–1923)
2	Stanley Bruce (1883–1967)		Flinders, Vic.	3 February 1923	23 October 1929	6 years and 264 days	Himself (1923–1929)
2	Stanley Bruce (1883–1967)		Flinders, Vic.	3 February 1923	23 October 1929	6 years and 264 days	Scullin (1929–1932)
3	John Latham (1877–1964)		Kooyong, Vic.	20 November 1929	May 1931	1 year and 191 days	Scullin (1929–1932)

== See also ==
- Australian nationalism
- List of political parties in Australia

== Footnotes ==
Notes

Sources

- Cunningham, Matthew (2022). Mobilising the Masses: Populist Conservative Movements in Australia and New Zealand During the Great Depression. ANU Press. ISBN 9781760465117.
- Williams, John R. (March 1971). "Financing Conservative Parties in Australia". Australian Quarterly. 43 (1): 7–19. doi:10.2307/20634415. JSTOR 20634415.
- Williams, John R. (June 1969). "The Organization of the Australian National Party". Australian Quarterly. 41 (2): 41–51. doi:10.2307/20634278. JSTOR 20634278.
- Duncan Hughes, J. G. (June 1931). "The Prospects of Nationalism in Australia". Australian Quarterly. 3 (10): 64–76. doi:10.2307/20628927. JSTOR 20628927.
- Eggleston, F. W. (November 1931). "Political Parties and Their Economic Policies". The Annals of the American Academy of Political and Social Science. 158: 243–250. doi:10.1177/000271623115800130. JSTOR 1018756. S2CID 144340284.
- "Election Speeches – 1919: Billy Hughes". electionspeeches.moadoph.gov.au. Museum of Australian Democracy at Old Parliament House. 1919.
- "Senate – Official Hansard – No. 8, 1917 – Sixth Parliament". Parliament of Australia. 22 February 1917.
- "Australian Election Gives Labor Majority To Form Government". Current History. 31 (2): 381–383. November 1929. JSTOR 45336155.
- Kirk, Neville (November 2006). "'Australians for Australia': The Right, the Labor Party and Contested Loyalties to Nation and Empire in Australia, 1917 to the Early 1930s". Labour History. 91: 95–111. doi:10.2307/27516154.
