= 1916 Australian conscription referendum =

- 28 October 1916
- Are you in favour of the Government having, in this grave emergency, the same compulsory powers over citizens in regard to requiring their military service, for the term of this war, outside the Commonwealth, as it now has in regard to military service within the Commonwealth?
- Outcome: Failed

Results
| Choice | Votes | % |
|---|---|---|
| Yes | 1,087,557 | 48.39% |
| No | 1,160,033 | 51.61% |
| Valid votes | 2,247,590 | 97.36% |
| Invalid or blank votes | 61,013 | 2.64% |
| Total votes | 2,308,603 | 100.00% |
| Registered voters/turnout | 2,789,830 | 82.75% |
- Results by state
- Note: Saturation of colour denotes strength of vote

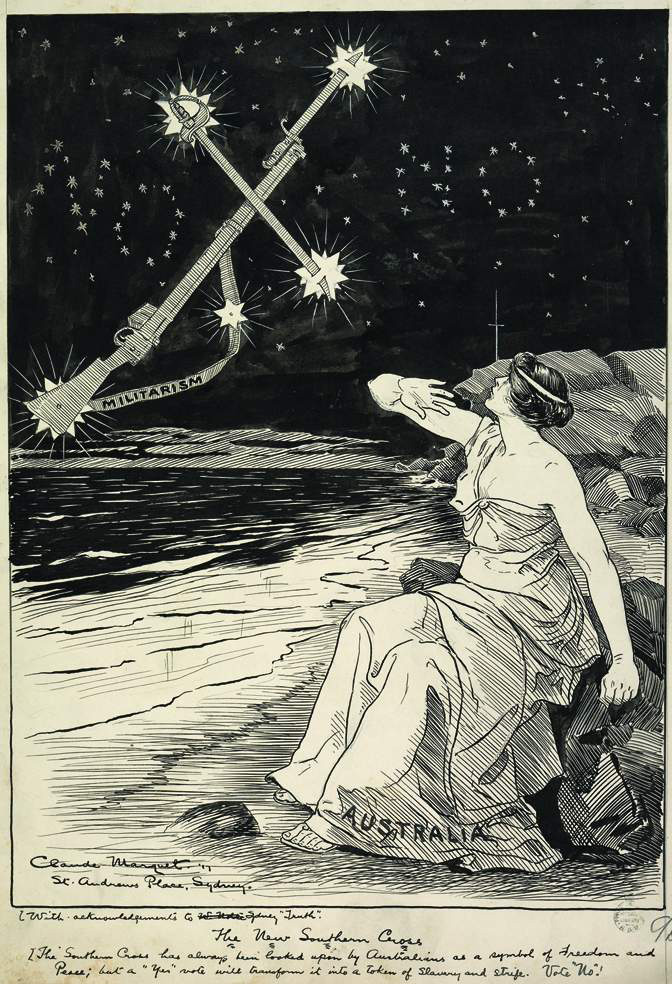
The New Southern Cross by Claude Marquet

The 1916 Australian referendum, concerning how conscripted soldiers could be deployed, was held on 28 October 1916. It was the first non-binding Australian referendum (often referred to as a plebiscite because it did not involve a constitutional question), and contained one proposition, which was Prime Minister Billy Hughes' proposal to allow conscripted troops to serve overseas during World War I.

Mandatory conscription for males aged 12 to 26 had been implemented in 1911. The use of conscripted troops to fight outside Australia was contentious, although the Australian government had sufficient powers to do so. Due to the controversial nature of the measure, and a lack of clear parliamentary support, Hughes took the issue to a public vote to obtain symbolic, rather than legal, sanction for the move. It was conducted under the Military Service Referendum Act 1916. The referendum sparked a divisive debate that split the nation and resulted in a close but clear rejection of the measure. It directly resulted in the Australian Labor Party split of 1916, the expulsion of Hughes and his supporters from the ALP, and the creation of a new Nationalist Party led by Hughes. After the 1917 election resulted in the re-election of Hughes, a second referendum was held late that year, about the same issue. The government had softened the conscription conditions and simplified the wording of the conscription proposal, but it was also rejected.

== Background ==
In mid-1916, enlistment levels for the Australian Imperial Force (AIF) had fallen to the lowest level yet. High casualty rates, a longer-than-expected conflict, and a fall in enthusiasm for the war combined to create a potential policy problem for the government in sustaining the war effort. Upon assuming office as Prime Minister in October 1915, Billy Hughes was eager to maintain, if not intensify, this effort. He was fervently jingoistic in his rhetoric and actions, desiring that Australia prove itself in the conflict through bravery and sacrifice. He had long supported compulsory military service even before Australia's Federation, and his affection and camaraderie with troops eventually earned him the moniker "The Little Digger".

However, despite some calls from leading politicians, the issue was divisive within Hughes' Labor Party, and he hoped conscription could be avoided through sufficient volunteerism. A mass campaign to mobilise new recruits was started in November 1915, and proved to be successful over the next six months at sustaining a steady flow of new troops to the front. Hughes had left for Great Britain (where conscription had just been introduced) in January 1916 to take part in the planning of the Allied war effort. Whilst abroad he went on extended tours on the front lines, and formed a strong personal bond with the soldiers that he visited, particularly those recovering in English and French hospitals. It became unthinkable to him that Australia should let these men down, and the strategic situation convinced him that conscription would be necessary to maintain Australia's war effort. Upon his return to Australia, he found that the domestic situation had shifted significantly, and the state of recruitment was dire. Hughes received word from Deputy Prime Minister George Pearce that troop replacements would be insufficient by December 1916 even at the most generous estimates.

In late July, the Battle of Pozières intensified demands for conscription. The AIF lost almost 28,000 men in actions on the Somme, most notably at Pozières, Mouquet Farm and Fromelles. Only 7,000 Australians were available in Great Britain to replace them. General William Birdwood, then Commander of the Australian and New Zealand Army Corps and his chief of staff, Brigadier General Brudenell White, requested that Australia send 20,000 men at once and an additional 15,000 over three months to rebuild the Australian divisions to full strength. In late August, the British Secretary of State for the Colonies cabled the Australian government notifying it of the heavy losses in France and warning that as many as 69,500 reinforcements would be needed within the next three months to keep the AIF 3rd Division in service. Such a request from the British Government was unheard of – something which Hughes made considerable beef of during the eventual campaign. The origin of the cable is subject to continuing questions; however, it appears that its timing and nature were not entirely coincidental. The cable was initially spurred by Hughes' own Australian representative in the British War Cabinet, Brigadier General Robert Anderson, keen to assist in the conscription campaign, working in concert with Bonar Law and Keith Murdoch. The figures were seen by some as a gross exaggeration – estimates by others, including those commanding the Australian divisions at the front, were much lower.

All of the historical documentation refers to the ballot as a "referendum", even though it did not involve a proposal to amend the Constitution of Australia. Because it was not an amendment to the Constitution, (1) it had no legal force, (2) it did not require approval in a majority of states, and (3) residents of federal territories were able to vote.

== Proposal ==
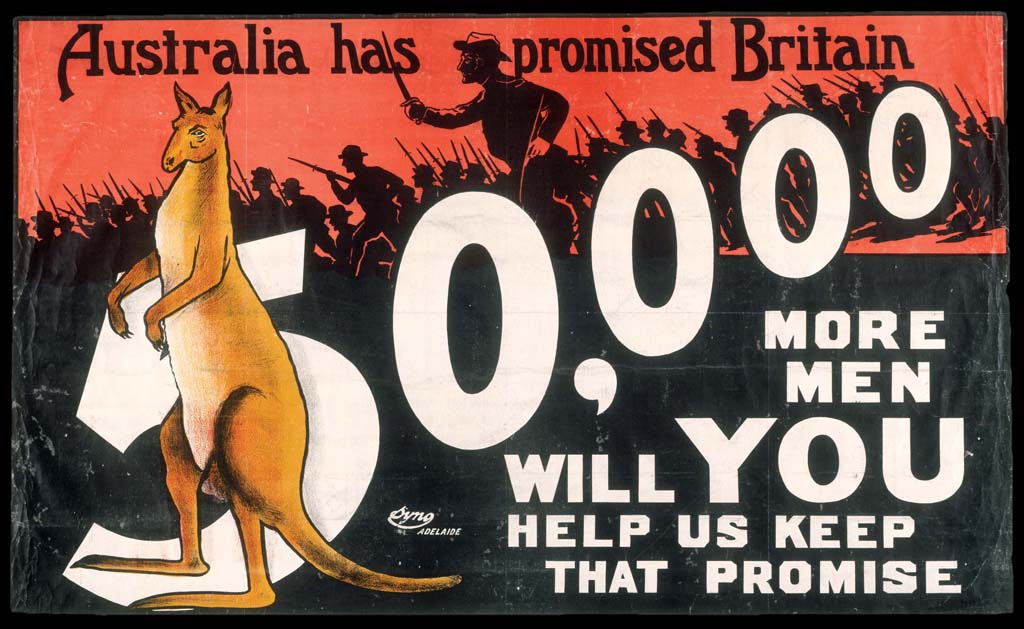
Poster encouraging enlistments, 1915.

The fact that conscription could split the Labor Party was obvious by mid-1916. Although Hughes was eager for conscription to be enacted immediately after returning from England, he bided his time in July and August to politically organise before putting the motion before Parliament. It became clear that support for a bill to introduce compulsory overseas conscription would be passed in the House, with the Opposition making up the deficit from Labor defectors, but not in the Senate. Conscription was thus deemed impossible to enact, given the political landscape in late 1916. However, a majority did exist in both houses to hold a public vote on the question. No such vote was strictly necessary, as the Commonwealth government already possessed the powers to enact conscription without amending the Constitution. The poll would thus actually be to gain symbolic, rather than legal, approval for the introduction of conscription.

The Governor-General, Ronald Munro Ferguson, 1st Viscount Novar, was a stern imperialist who openly associated with the David Lloyd George government in England and was influential behind the scenes in pushing for conscription to aid the Empire's war effort. Realising the impasse, Munro Ferguson promised Hughes upon his return that he would sign a bill for conscription, and grant a double dissolution if the parliament could not pass it. However, Hughes quickly realised that the issue could destroy the party, especially if taken to a general election, and that there were few options except to take the question directly to the people. This route was advised by High Court Justices Edmund Barton and Samuel Griffith. At least one close associate felt that the prospect of a referendum on the issue also appealed to Hughes‘ self-perception of his popular status. "Hughes revelled in his own success as a charismatic leader, and it appealed strongly to his romantic nature to be able to talk directly with the people".

Hughes put the full proposal to Caucus and Cabinet. He pulled out all the stops in the advocacy of his proposal, claiming that France was on the verge of collapse, Imperial forces were stretched to the limit, and Germany was winning the war just about everywhere. Furthermore, if the government could not take the steps necessary to win the war, then the public would elect an opposition who could. He claimed, amongst other things, that 80% of the population wanted conscription, and that the opposition that had emerged would be carried for the proposal by the end of the campaign. He ended his argument with the statement: "Don't leave the boys in the trenches. Don't see them butchered. Don't leave them below their strength or you cover Australia with shame".

Over the next three days, constant debate and fighting saw a gradual watering-down of Hughes' proposal, with conscription only to be implemented to make up the deficit in voluntary recruitment, with the general call-up being postponed until October, and should the numbers needed be reached by volunteerism by October, the proposal would be scrapped. The possible exemptions were also expanded as part of the ability to compromise and bring more people into the supporting side. With these modifications, a bare pass in Caucus was achieved on 28 August.

Hughes met with the Victorian Political Executive of the Labor Party, chaired by Executive President E. J. Holloway. "For an hour, he addressed members, trying by every one of his many oratorical, logical and political tricks to convert all, or at least some, of the Executive members to support his referendum campaign". Arguing on points of morale and maintaining Australian honour, Hughes concluded that he "was going to fight for a "Yes" vote as though he were fighting for his very life". Holloway and his supporters were unconvinced, and were not moved by the speech. Hughes would have a similar lack of success at other state Labor organisations. Days later he spoke before the New South Wales Labor executive and then a special meeting convened of the New South Wales Trades and Labor Council. No records are kept of those meetings; however, motions were passed at their conclusion reaffirming opposition to conscription. Some prominent Labor politicians, though, including New South Wales Premier William Holman and South Australian Premier Crawford Vaughan, backed Hughes and rejected the party line. Ultimately, Queensland, New South Wales, and Victoria declared themselves against the proposal in state caucuses. South Australia, Western Australia and Tasmania did not take a position, and supported the principle of the referendum for the people to decide. Hughes had been unsuccessful in taking the bulk of his party along with him.

In September, Opposition and Commonwealth Liberal Party leader Joseph Cook addressed parliament in support of conscription: "There are some that do not believe in the compulsion of men, who say that Australia has done enough ... I hope there are few men in the parliament who believe that ... We are proud of what the Empire has done, and our contribution must be adequate, and in every way worthy of that effort ... To palter now would be a national sin, a national calamity." As opposition leader, Cook had opposed almost no government measures throughout 1916, and Hughes and his faction were becoming increasingly distant from the bulk of the ALP and aligning much more with the conservative opposition. When the second reading of the Military Service Referendum bill was moved, it carried 46 to 10 in the House and 19 to 9 in the Senate. In neither house did any member of the opposition vote against the bill — the opposing vote came entirely from Labor detractors. Upon the second moving of the Referendum Bill, Frank Tudor resigned from Hughes' cabinet. A group of 15 representatives and 12 senators, led by Frank Brennan and Myles Ferricks, opposed the bill at every stage on the grounds that it was a question of conscience on which no majority, no matter how large, had a right to impose its will on the minority. Hughes stared down his enemies within the party and committed himself fully to the campaign: "For myself, I say that I am going into this referendum campaign as if it were the only thing for which I lived."

== Public debate ==
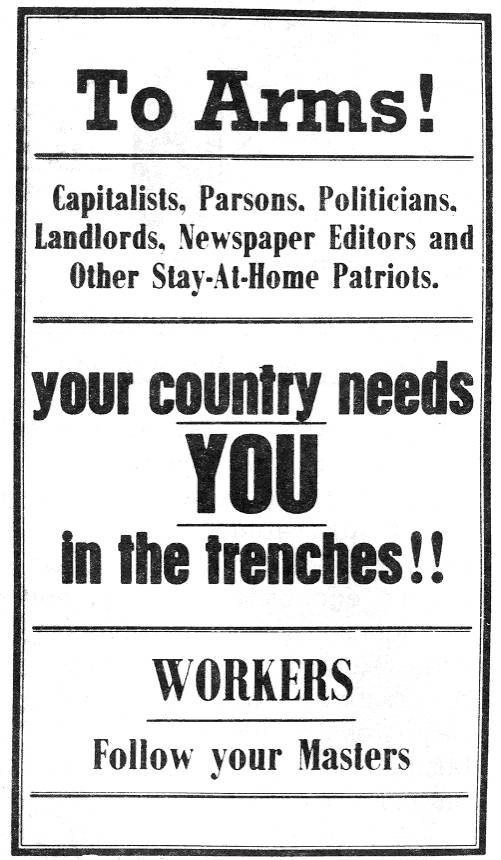
A poster for the anti-conscription "No" campaign by the Industrial Workers of the World, 1916

The debate over whether to introduce conscription had risen in profile with the public, and many sectors of the population were heavily divided on the issue. The highly influential Australian Natives' Association announced in mid-1916 that "[t]he needs of war can no longer be met by voluntary service ... this association pledges itself to support the Government to utilise the services of every citizen." Yet the branches of the ANA were split in response to the executive's announcement, with some branches declaring against conscription (such as Coburn) and others rallying to support (Collingwood). Coming into the conscription debate, organised labour's opposition was not unanimous. The Age published an analysis of the situation on 13 April and came to the conclusion that "if a vote were taken of the rank and file of the entire movement, there would be an undoubted demand for conscription". Some Labor supporters did so only on the proviso of an accompanying 'conscription of wealth'. This had been an issue within the Labor Party for some time – in Australia in 1916, the wealth census revealed that 80% of the assets and wealth tabulated in the nation were held by just 15% of the population. The issue never got off the ground in a coherent way, and many counter-argued that taxation was exactly a form of wealth conscription, and that fixed assets could hardly be mobilised with sufficient liquidity to help the war effort.

Opponents to the bill stood largely behind two different principles. Some of them, with Andrew Fisher being perhaps the best known, fully agreed about the danger threatening Australia if the war was lost, and with the consequent necessity of carrying on the war with the utmost power that could be developed. However, they believed that the best effort that could be mustered would be as a result of voluntary efforts only, and the effort to introduce conscription to a nation that did not feel directly threatened would only cause infighting and actually hamper the war effort. The other group of opponents, led by default by Frank Tudor and T. J. Ryan, argued that whilst it may be justifiable to compel men to do many things, compelling them to take life and risk their own came in a different category. Under no circumstances was it just to force a man to kill another man. The Australian Worker put this popular Labor Party platform thus: "Society may say to the individual: 'you must love this; you must hate that'. But unless the individual feels love or hatred springing from his own convictions and his own feelings, society commands him in vain. He cannot love to order. He cannot hate to order. These passions must find their source within his soul ... the man who is forced to fight is a vilely outraged as the woman who is forced to fondle." Similar sentiments were echoed by the Australian Freedom League, which opposed the bill because it would prevent the expression of freedom of conscience.

Trade unionists feared that the bill would open the door for foreign labour to immigrate and take jobs from the fighting men. Frank Anstey proclaimed on the floor of parliament during the introduction of the bill:

"The clause provides that this measure may be cited as 'Military Service Referendum act', and I am of the opinion that its objects and purpose should be stated in more explicit language in that title. I therefore move that the words 'Military Service' be left out, with a view to insert in lieu thereof the words 'Coloured Labour'....one of the advantages to be anticipated from the carrying of the proposed referendum is the advance of our industries by the sending out of the country 200,000 to 300,000 of our men, and replacing them by coloured labourers."

Much of the propaganda against conscription sought to play upon the fears of several sections of the community – women would lose their sons and spouses, farmers' fields would fall fallow without sufficient labour, and workers would be replaced by cheap foreign labour in their absence. However, just about every influential public man in Australia otherwise supported the conscription campaign. All non-Catholic church heads published in support of the movement, as well as the Salvation Army, the newspapers, and many jurists. Upon the announcement of the campaign and the vote, most media outlets quickly took up the cause, brandishing stirring rhetoric and powerful images. Norman Lindsay and David Low produced some of the most powerful images of the war with their posters in support of the 'yes' vote.

=== Public meetings ===
The conscription issue deeply divided Australia; large meetings were held, both for and against. The women's vote was seen as important; there were large women's meetings, and campaign information from both sides aimed at women voters. The campaigning for the first plebiscite was launched by Hughes at a huge overflow meeting at the Sydney Town Hall, where he outlined the Government's proposals. This was followed by a huge pro-conscription meeting at the Melbourne Town Hall on 21 September.

Anti-conscriptionists, especially in Melbourne, were also able to mobilise large crowds with a meeting filling the Exhibition Building on 20 September 1916; 30,000 people on the Yarra bank on Sunday, 15 October, and 25,000 the following week; a "parade of women promoted by the United Women's No-Conscription Committee – an immense crowd of about 60,000 people gathered at Swanston St between Guild Hall and Princes Bridge, and for upwards of an hour the street was a surging area of humanity". An anti-conscription stop work meeting called by five trade unions held on the Yarra Bank mid-week on 4 October attracted 15,000 people.

== Campaign ==
Hughes' campaign over the next months involved traveling great distances. From the opening in Sydney, he traversed the country, reaching major stops in Melbourne on 21 September, Adelaide on 25 September, Sydney and then Brisbane on 1 October, Hobart on 12 October, Melbourne again on 15 October, Albury on 23 October, Newcastle on 25 October, and Sydney again on 26 October. Throughout the campaign, he was PM, Attorney-General, and (after Tudor's resignation), Minister for Customs. Hughes' efforts made him the focal point and central figure of the entire campaign. "The campaign for conscription was almost becoming a battle over Mr. Hughes and his statements." Indeed, the outcome of the referendum depended a great deal on his own personal actions, particularly in the last four weeks of the campaign.

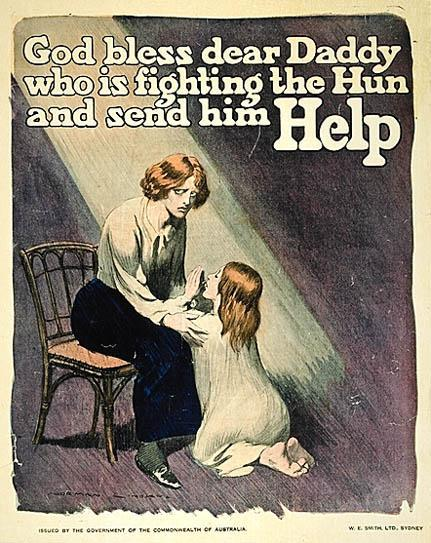
Artist Norman Lindsay produced a number of posters for the campaign.

Everywhere Hughes went, his meetings were well attended and his speeches enthusiastically received. However, as commentators later noted, the crowds were overwhelmingly middle-class and conservative in their make-up. The numerous anti-conscription meetings went largely unreported, and Hughes had little opportunity to address the Labor and working class audiences which he had traditionally identified with. Hughes was essentially isolated from the movement with which he had built his career. He was expelled from the NSW Political Labor League in mid-September. The Sydney Wharf Union (which Hughes had founded) expelled him on 27 September, and the Trolley, Draymen and Carters’ Union (which he had also founded) followed suit six days later. Finally, on 26 October, Labor's West Sydney electoral council voted for his expulsion as well, ending his endorsement to stand for Labor in the electorate he had represented since 1894. Hughes purportedly brushed those moves aside, but it is clear that his campaign left him personally isolated from those with whom he been involved during his earlier career. He missed no opportunity to speak to working-class or disaffected groups, but was largely denied access to them, although he very frequently spoke to assemblages of women. A strategy he used to help convince the working classes was to secure the support of foreign labor-aligned political officials, largely from the British Labour Party and the French Socialist Party. Several were forthcoming in October.

Anticipating that the referendum would pass, and desiring that as many men as possible be readied for service following its passage, Hughes issued a directive that severely undermined his popularity. Using pre-existing powers under the Defence Act, Hughes ordered all eligible men between 21 and 35 to report for military duty, to be examined for medical fitness, and then go into training camp. Exemption courts could grant a leave to individuals based on specified criteria such as ill-fitness, employment in certain industries, or conscientious objection. The Governor-General approved the declaration, and the call-up was announced, with all eligible men compelled to report. One significant aspect of this measure was the compulsory fingerprinting of all those called up for enlistment. The reason was valid enough – there were problems with exemption certificates being fraudulently produced, or valid certificates being sold or reused by other individuals and fingerprinting was thought to be a solution to this problem. However, there was significant public backlash from this "October Surprise". The use of fingerprinting was almost solely associated with criminal activity and investigation, and was unnecessarily heavy-handed. Many resented this pre-emptive measure by Hughes, viewing it as an arrogant assumption about the result of the forthcoming vote.

Several contemporary observers felt that this action was the turning point in the campaign. Until that point, all indications seemed to favour a victory for the "Yes" vote, but thereafter, the momentum swung steadily towards "No". Huge meetings were taking place all over Australia. Although the political leadership had largely decided in favour of conscription, the rank and file were showing themselves to be acting independently of their leadership. These forces consolidated more solidly in the first week of October, with J.H. Catts becoming the general organiser and director of the Anti-Conscription campaign. Catts took a much more moderate position than many others in the "anti" campaign, and was a significant boost to its credibility. He favoured conscription for home defence, which was an acceptable compromise for those with concerns about Australia's own security.

On 25 October, at a meeting of the Commonwealth Executive Council, Hughes decided to issue another decree. The meeting was poorly attended, with mostly anti-conscription members of the cabinet present – Edward Russell (Assistant Minister), Albert Gardiner (Treasurer), Jens Jensen (Navy), and the Treasurer William Higgs. However, Hughes tabled a proposal to authorise returning officers on polling day to ask voters who were men between ages 21 and 35 whether they had evaded the call-up and if they were in fact authorised to vote. If their answer was not satisfactory, their votes would be put aside for future consideration as to whether they should be counted. The proclamation of this new regulation was to be delayed until the very last possible moment before the poll. Hughes seems to have been completely unaware of how high-handed such an edict appeared to his fellow Cabinet members, and to the public in general. The Executive Council rejected the proposal on that occasion. On 27 October, Hughes reconvened the Council, with the Governor-General present, as well as Jensen and Webster, but not the three previous attendees. This time the Council approved the motion, although the Governor-General was not told about the rejection of the same proposal two days earlier. The edict was published in the Government Gazette that evening.

The fallout was swift. Gardiner, Higgs and Russell resigned from Cabinet and issued a press statement giving their views on the situation, which cleared the usually pro-government censors because Higgs temporarily held the Defence portfolio, due to George Pearce's absence in Western Australia, so Hughes was unable to prevent its publication. The government was threatened with collapse, with four of the nine members of the First Hughes Ministry having quit. The publicity about Hughes' peremptory move and its consequences was a disaster, coming on the eve of the poll, and the veneer of a unified and strong government under Hughes was destroyed. Hughes, distraught and overwrought, called the Governor-General at midnight, saying he had no one else to talk to, and the two men conversed in the wee-hours of the morning, with Lord Novar offering sympathy and support to his old colleague, but ultimately both understood that the cause was probably lost.

== Results ==
Are you in favour of the Government having, in this grave emergency, the same compulsory powers over citizens in regard to requiring their military service, for the term of this war, outside the Commonwealth, as it now has in regard to military service within the Commonwealth?

Results
| State | Electoral roll | Ballots issued | For | | Against | | Informal |
| State | Electoral roll | Ballots issued | Vote | % | Vote | % | Informal |
| New South Wales | 1,055,986 | 858,399 | 356,805 | 42.92 | 474,544 | 57.08 | 27,050 |
| Victoria | 824,972 | 696,684 | 353,930 | 51.88 | 328,216 | 48.12 | 14,538 |
| Queensland | 366,042 | 309,921 | 144,200 | 47.71 | 158,051 | 52.29 | 7,670 |
| South Australia | 262,781 | 211,252 | 87,924 | 42.44 | 119,236 | 57.56 | 4,092 |
| Western Australia | 167,602 | 140,648 | 94,069 | 69.71 | 40,884 | 30.29 | 5,695 |
| Tasmania | 107,875 | 88,231 | 48,493 | 56.17 | 37,833 | 43.83 | 1,905 |
| Federal Territories | 4,572 | 3,468 | 2,136 | 62.73 | 1,269 | 37.27 | 63 |
| Total^{†} | 2,789,830 | 2,308,603 | 1,087,557 | 48.39 | 1,160,033 | 51.61 | 61,013 |
^{†}Including 133,813 votes by members of the Australian Imperial Force, of which 72,399 were for, 58,894 against, and 2,520 informal.
| Results | Obtained an overall minority of 72 476 votes. Not carried | | | | | | |

== Aftermath ==
The defeat of the proposal came as a great surprise to most commentators; few had predicted that it would fail. The Labor movement, and the 'anti' cause in general, had fought under many disadvantages, and the 'yes' campaign had most of the media, many major public institutions, and many of the state governments on its side. Supporters of the referendum were circumspect in their analysis of the result, noting that only a few percentage points and fewer than 75,000 voters had separated the results. The support for the vote in Victoria was surprising to many, given that it had often been the locus of anti-conscription rhetoric.

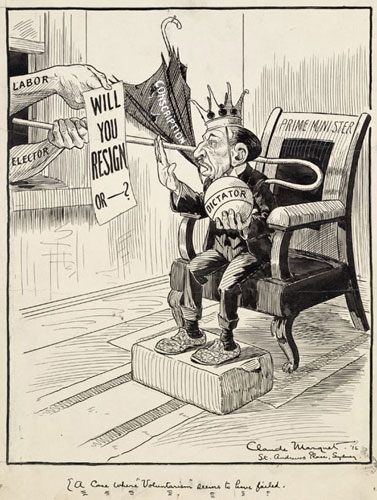

There were many reasons why the poll was unsuccessful. World War I itself was seen as a "right versus might" conflict, and conscription seemed to fly in the face of that. Most, though, consider the deciding factor between the initial enthusiasm for the 'yes' vote and the eventual 'no' vote to be related to the actions of Hughes and his mistakes in the exercise of government power. The heavy-handed tactics, the arrogance displayed, and eventually the dirty fighting, created more detractors than supporters; these faults, and additionally Hughes' inability to appeal, either directly or indirectly, to many ordinary voters, were major problems that hampered the 'yes' campaign. The call-up, and the collapse of cabinet, were the two events that dealt the prospects for 'yes' a death blow in the final weeks of the campaign.

Hughes' gamble had not paid off, and he was forced to dramatically reappraise the position of Australia in the war. Recruitment was temporarily helped by the small surge caused by the general call-up just before the vote (enough at least to maintain the lower estimates of troop needs for a few months). However, it soon returned to its lowest numbers. The fallout from the failure to secure conscription at the ballot box was significant. Despite the numerous political post-mortems and attempts at reconciliation, it was now clear to most people that Hughes could no longer command the respect or service of his Labor Party colleagues. The government was revealed to be a shell, consisting of Hughes, Pearce and just two other ministers.

Immediately following the poll, another event – which would be the last straw for the Labor Party – emerged. A general strike amongst the coalminers had been brewing throughout October, and by November it had boiled over. Within weeks the Labor Party split, Hughes and his followers walking out to form a new National Labor Party that would eventually merge with the opposition Commonwealth Liberal Party to form the Nationalists and maintain Hughes as prime minister for another six years.

Hughes accepted the decision of the voters, despite calls from some newspapers and supporters to push ahead with the introduction of conscription regardless of the result. On 23 November 1916 it was announced that the government would revoke the September conscription proclamation. The men who had been called up and who had reported would be free to return home upon a month of training; men who had been sentenced by the exemption courts had their sentences annulled. In their analysis of the failure of the poll, Hughes and Pearce calculated that, assuming a consistent bloc of support from the Commonwealth Liberal Party, about half of the Labor movement had stuck with Hughes at the polls, and half had defected to defeat the referendum, in concert with other narrower demographic groups such as farmers, pacifists and the Irish. Through the operations of his colleagues during the two-week interlude between the failure of the vote and the break-up of the party, Hughes was aware that the Labor Party was conspiring to rid themselves of him at the first opportune moment, presumably after the settlement of the coalminers' industrial dispute.

== See also ==
- 1917 Australian conscription referendum
- Conscription in Australia
- Australia in World War I

== Bibliography ==
- Bean, C.E.W. (1941). Official History of Australia in the War of 1914–1918 Vol. III, The Australian Imperial Force in France, 1916 – via Australian War Memorial, Canberra.
- Booker, Malcolm (1980). The Great Professional: A Study of W. M. Hughes. McGraw-Hill. ISBN 0070729360.
- Fitzhardinge, L.F. (1979). The Little Digger: A Political Biography of William Morris Hughes. Sydney: Angus & Robertson. ISBN 0207132453.
- Forward, Roy & Reece, Bob (1968). Conscription in Australia. Brisbane: University of Queensland Press.
- Grey, Jeffrey (2008). A Military History of Australia (3rd ed.). Port Melbourne: Cambridge University Press. ISBN 9780521697910.
- Holloway, E.J. (1966). The Australian Victory over Conscription in 1916–17 (PDF). Anti-Conscription Jubilee Committee.
- Jauncey, Leslie (1968). The Story of Conscription in Australia. Melbourne: Macmillan.
- Main, J.M. (1970). Conscription: The Australian Debate, 1901–1970. Stanmore, NSW: Cassell Australia. ISBN 0726954578.
- Scott, Ernest (1941). Official History of Australia in the War of 1914–1918: Vol. XI, Australia During the War – via Australian War Memorial, Canberra.
