= George Currie (British politician) =

George Currie

George Welsh Currie (1870 – 3 June 1950) was a British politician.

Born in Edinburgh, he was the son of the Reverend James Currie. Following education at the University of Edinburgh he entered business as an accountant, and travelled widely in the United States, Canada and South America. He became a strong supporter of Joseph Chamberlain and in 1906 became secretary of the Scottish branch of the Tariff Reform League.

When the sitting Member of Parliament for Leith Burghs, Ronald Ferguson, was appointed Governor-General of Australia in 1914, Currie was chosen by the Scottish Unionist Party to attack the seat at the resulting by-election. He gained the seat, but only by a narrow majority of 16 votes.

When the next general election was held at the end of 1918, there was a redistribution of parliamentary seats under the Representation of the People Act. Currie stood in the new Leith seat as a supporter of David Lloyd George's coalition government, but lost fairly narrowly to the Liberal candidate, William Wedgwood Benn.

Currie did not return to parliament, but was appointed to a number of advisory boards. Over time he moved politically to the left, and in June 1935 was elected to the London County Council as a Labour Party councillor representing Wandsworth Central. He was president of the Chelsea Labour Party from 1936. He resigned from the council in 1939.

Outside politics Currie was active in the administration of the Church of England in the Dioceses of London and Guildford.

He died at his home in Witley, Surrey, aged 79.

Parliament of the United Kingdom
Preceded by Ronald Munro Ferguson	Member of Parliament for Leith Burghs; 1914–1918	constituency abolished
