= Robert Andrew Macfie =

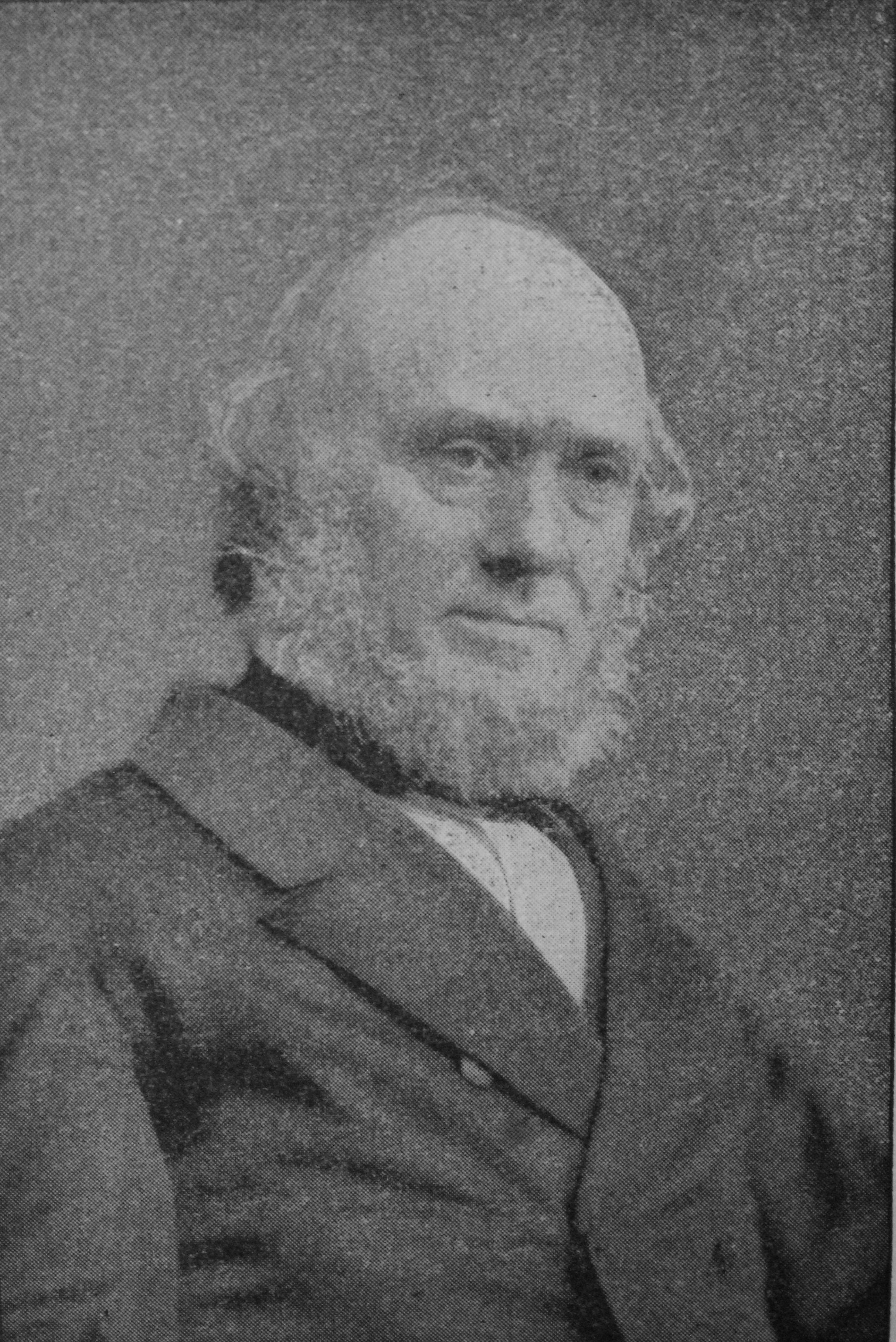
Robert Andrew Macfie

Robert Andrew Macfie (4 October 1811 – 16 February 1893) was a Scottish businessman and, in later life, a Member of the British Parliament.

== Life ==
Macfie was born at 52 Kirkgate in Leith, the son of John Macfie, sugar-refiner, and his wife, Alison Thorburn, daughter William Thorburn, a Leith merchant. His father, son of Robert Macfie of Langhouse (who established the sugar works in Greenock) had built a new sugarhouse in 1804, on Elbe Street in Leith. John Macfie was the official who greeted King George IV on his arrival in Leith for a national visit in 1822, then being Chief Magistrate of Leith.

He attended Leith High School then the Royal High School in nearby Edinburgh, to which he had won a scholarship. As a schoolboy he displayed particular interest in geology and mineralogy. He left school in 1825 and in October, round about the time of his 15th birthday, he started attending classes at the University of Edinburgh, where he continued his studies till 1827.

His father relocated to the Canongate on Edinburgh's Royal Mile in 1830 (the site now known as Sugarhouse Close) and Robert then joined his father running this premises. In 1835 Robert also became an agent for he National Bank of Scotland, of which his father was a founding director.

In September 1838 he relocated to Liverpool in England, there to establish, in the first instance at a rented refinery at 5 Temple Street, a Liverpool branch of the family sugar business, Macfie & Sons. In Liverpool he was one of the original directors of Liverpool Chamber of Commerce. Alongside William Gladstone he was also one of the five trustees of the Liverpool Exchange.

In 1877 he was elected a Fellow of the Royal Society of Edinburgh. His proposers were Christian H. Millar, David Stevenson (engineer), John Hutton Balfour and Sir Andrew Douglas Maclagan.

From 1886 to 1892 he served as one of the ruling council members of the influential Edinburgh conservationist body the Cockburn Association.

Around 1880 he purchased Dreghorn Castle near Colinton (south west of Edinburgh) from the Trotter family and made it his family home. He hosted the King Kalākaua of Hawaii during his 1881 world tour and his niece Princess Kaʻiulani and her Scottish father Archibald Scott Cleghorn in 1892. During the princess' visit, the Hawaiian flag was flown over Dreghorn in her honor.

He died on 17 February 1893 at Dreghorn Castle south-west of Edinburgh. He had retired to this site in 1871. The site was later redeveloped as Dreghorn Barracks. He was buried with his family in South Leith Parish Churchyard.

== National Politics ==
Macfie stood for election to the British parliament as the Liberal Party candidate in 1859, but failed to be elected, losing to Sir William Miller, 1st Baronet. He was more successful in 1868, winning by 2285 votes to 1995, and from November 1868 to February 1874 he served as a Liberal Party Member of the British Parliament, representing the constituency of Leith Burghs near to Edinburgh.

== Postal reform ==
As a Liberal MP, Macfie took a particular interest in Postal Reform, but long before he entered parliament he held strong views on the subject. As a young businessman based, by now, in Greenock, he responded with characteristic passion and at considerable length, in a letter dated 31 March 1838, to an invitation from a committee of London Merchants to provide information appropriately. His father returning from a business trip to London and finding that Macfie had been "meddling in public matters" in this way opined strongly that at the age of 26 the son was far too young for this level of involvement, and there is no record of Macfie having challenged his father's judgement nor, in the immediate term, of his having again involved himself in public life.

== Family ==
On 17 May 1839 Macfie proposed marriage to Caroline Eliza Easton, daughter of the late Dr John Easton of Courancehill near Edinburgh. The marriage took place in Edinburgh in January 1840, following what was seen as an unusually long engagement. The couple produced 7 recorded children, born between 1840 and 1854 in Liverpool where Macfie was by now based.

His children included J W Macfie who ran the sugar refinery in Liverpool and resided at Rowton Hall in Cheshire.

His daughter Ellison Thorburn Macfie (1842-1906) married Sir Thomas McClure.

A second daughter married Major George Barbour of Bolesworth Castle.

== Philanthropy ==
In 1860, Macfie and Sons presented £180 to the Royal National Lifeboat Institution (RNLI), for the purchase of the first lifeboat for the town of Banff in Aberdeenshire, historically Banffshire, Scotland. The 30-foot Peake-class self-righting lifeboat was named Banff, and served at Banff Lifeboat Station for 10 years between 1860 and 1870.

== Notes ==
Parliament of the United Kingdom
Preceded by Sir William Miller	Member of Parliament for Leith Burghs; 1868–1874	Succeeded by Donald Robert Macgregor
