= Leith Burghs =

Parliamentary constituency in the United Kingdom, 1832–1918

- Former district of burghs constituency for the House of Commons

1832–1918
- Seats: One
- Created from: Edinburgh and Midlothian
- Replaced by: Leith; Edinburgh East

Leith Burghs was a district of burghs constituency of the House of Commons of the Parliament of the United Kingdom from 1832 to 1918. The constituency represented the parliamentary burghs of Leith, Musselburgh and Portobello.

In 1918 Leith was included in Leith, while Musselburgh and Portobello were merged into Edinburgh East.

== Members of Parliament ==
Election	Member	Party
1832	John Murray	Whig
1839 by-election	Andrew Rutherfurd	Whig
1851 by-election	James Moncreiff	Whig
1859	Sir William Miller	Liberal
1865	Sir William Miller	Liberal
1868	Robert Andrew Macfie	Liberal
1874	Donald Robert Macgregor	Liberal
1878	Andrew Grant	Liberal
1885	William Jacks	Liberal
1886	William Jacks	Liberal Unionist
1886	William Ewart Gladstone	Liberal
1886	Ronald Munro Ferguson	Liberal
1914	George Welsh Currie	Unionist
1918	constituency abolished	

== Election results ==
=== Elections in the 1830s ===
General election 1832: Leith Burghs
Party	Candidate	Votes	%	±%
Liberal	John Archibald Murray	Unopposed		
Registered electors		1,624		
Liberal win (new seat)				

General election 1835: Leith Burghs
Party	Candidate	Votes	%	±%
Liberal	John Archibald Murray	Unopposed		
Registered electors		1,838		
Liberal hold				

General election 1837: Leith Burghs
Party	Candidate	Votes	%	±%
Liberal	John Archibald Murray	Unopposed		
Registered electors		2,171		
Liberal hold				

By-election 1839: Leith Burghs
Party	Candidate	Votes	%	±%
Liberal	Andrew Rutherfurd	Unopposed		
Liberal hold				

=== Elections in the 1840s ===
General election 1841: Leith Burghs
Party	Candidate	Votes	%	±%
Liberal	Andrew Rutherfurd	Unopposed		
Registered electors		1,732		
Liberal hold				

General election 1847: Leith Burghs
Party	Candidate	Votes	%	±%
Liberal	Andrew Rutherfurd	Unopposed		
Registered electors		1,888		
Liberal hold				

=== Elections in the 1850s ===
By-election 11 April 1851: Leith Burghs
Party	Candidate	Votes	%	±%
Liberal	James Moncreiff	Unopposed		
Liberal hold				

General election 1852: Leith Burghs
Party	Candidate	Votes	%	±%
Liberal	James Moncreiff	643	61.2	N/A
Conservative	T. W. Henderson	407	38.8	New
Majority		236	22.4	N/A
Turnout		1,050	51.8	N/A
Registered electors		2,027		
Liberal hold				

General election 1857: Leith Burghs
Party	Candidate	Votes	%	±%
Liberal	James Moncreiff	821	53.9	−7.3
Liberal	William Miller	701	46.1	N/A
Majority		120	7.8	N/A
Turnout		1,522	77.1	+25.3
Registered electors		1,973		
Liberal hold				

General election 1859: Leith Burghs
Party	Candidate	Votes	%	±%
Liberal	William Miller	904	54.8	+8.7
Liberal	Robert Andrew Macfie	746	45.2	N/A
Majority		158	9.6	+1.8
Turnout		1,650	77.1	0.0
Registered electors		2,139		
Liberal hold				

=== Elections in the 1860s ===
General election 1865: Leith Burghs
Party	Candidate	Votes	%	±%
Liberal	William Miller	Unopposed		
Registered electors		2,672		
Liberal hold				

General election 1868: Leith Burghs
Party	Candidate	Votes	%	±%
Liberal	Robert Andrew Macfie	2,907	55.7	N/A
Liberal	William Miller	2,310	44.3	N/A
Majority		597	11.4	N/A
Turnout		5,217	83.8	N/A
Registered electors		6,223		
Liberal hold				

=== Elections in the 1870s ===
General election 1874: Leith Burghs
Party	Candidate	Votes	%	±%
Liberal	Donald Robert Macgregor	4,489	69.8	N/A
Liberal	Robert Andrew Macfie	1,945	30.2	N/A
Majority		2,544	39.6	+28.2
Turnout		6,434	78.0	−5.8
Registered electors		8,248		
Liberal hold				

By-election 29 Jan 1878: Leith Burghs
Party	Candidate	Votes	%	±%
Liberal	Andrew Grant	4,929	73.4	+3.6
Conservative	C. W. Tennant	1,788	26.6	New
Majority		3,141	46.8	+7.2
Turnout		6,717	69.0	−9.0
Registered electors		9,739		
Liberal hold				

=== Elections in the 1880s ===
General election 1880: Leith Burghs
Party	Candidate	Votes	%	±%
Liberal	Andrew Grant	Unopposed		
Registered electors		10,333		
Liberal hold				

General election 1885: Leith Burghs
Party	Candidate	Votes	%	±%
Liberal	William Jacks	6,355	71.9	N/A
Conservative	William David Thorburn	2,485	28.1	New
Majority		3,870	43.8	N/A
Turnout		8,840	75.0	N/A
Registered electors		11,779		
Liberal hold				

General election 1886: Leith Burghs
Party	Candidate	Votes	%	±%
Liberal	William Ewart Gladstone	Unopposed		
Liberal hold				

By-election 20 Aug 1886: Leith Burghs
Party	Candidate	Votes	%	±%
Liberal	Ronald Munro Ferguson	4,204	58.2	N/A
Ind. Liberal Unionist	Donald Robert Macgregor	1,528	21.1	N/A
Liberal Unionist	William Jacks	1,499	20.7	N/A
Ind. Liberal Unionist	Henry Munster	3	0.0	N/A
Majority		2,676	37.1	N/A
Turnout		7,234	61.4	N/A
Registered electors		11,779		
Liberal hold				

=== Elections in the 1890s ===
General election 1892: Leith Burghs
Party	Candidate	Votes	%	±%
Liberal	Ronald Munro Ferguson	5,738	58.4	+0.2
Liberal Unionist	William Alexander Bell	4,095	41.6	+20.9
Majority		1,643	16.8	−20.3
Turnout		9,833	74.5	+13.1
Registered electors		13,198		
Liberal hold				

General election 1895: Leith Burghs
Party	Candidate	Votes	%	±%
Liberal	Ronald Munro Ferguson	5,819	55.4	−3.0
Liberal Unionist	John Wilson	4,494	44.6	+3.0
Majority		1,325	10.8	−6.0
Turnout		10,313	73.8	−0.7
Registered electors		13,982		
Liberal hold				

=== Elections in the 1900s ===
General election 1900: Leith Burghs
Party	Candidate	Votes	%	±%
Liberal	Ronald Munro Ferguson	6,043	53.6	−1.8
Liberal Unionist	Edward Theodore Salvesen	5,226	46.4	+1.8
Majority		817	7.2	−3.6
Turnout		11,269	72.8	−1.0
Registered electors		15,484		
Liberal hold				

General election 1906: Leith Burghs
Party	Candidate	Votes	%	±%
Liberal	Ronald Munro Ferguson	7,677	61.2	+7.6
Liberal Unionist	Frank T. Cooper KC	4,865	38.8	−7.6
Majority		2,802	22.4	+15.2
Turnout		12,542	73.9	+1.1
Registered electors		16,974		
Liberal hold				

=== Elections in the 1910s ===
General election January 1910: Leith Burghs
Party	Candidate	Votes	%	±%
Liberal	Ronald Munro Ferguson	7,146	49.6	−11.6
Liberal Unionist	Sir Robert Cranston	4,540	31.5	−7.3
Labour	William Walker	2,724	18.9	New
Majority		2,606	18.1	−4.3
Turnout		14,410	83.0	+9.1
Registered electors		17,351		
Liberal hold				

General election December 1910: Leith Burghs
Party	Candidate	Votes	%	±%
Liberal	Ronald Munro Ferguson	7,069	57.2	+7.6
Conservative	Frederick Alexander Macquisten	5,284	42.8	+11.3
Majority		1,785	14.4	−3.7
Turnout		12,353	68.7	−14.3
Registered electors		17,987		
Liberal hold				

By-election 26 Feb 1914: Leith Burghs
Party	Candidate	Votes	%	±%
Conservative	George Welsh Currie	5,159	37.8	−5.0
Liberal	Malcolm Smith	5,143	37.7	−19.5
Labour	Joseph Nicholas Bell	3,346	24.5	New
Majority		16	0.1	N/A
Turnout		13,648	77.1	+8.4
Registered electors		17,705		
Conservative gain from Liberal		Swing	+12.3	

== See also ==
- District of burghs
