= National Amalgamated Union of Labour =

Trade union

- Merged into: National Union of General and Municipal Workers
- Founded: 1888
- Dissolved: 1924
- Headquarters: 4 Higham Place, Newcastle upon Tyne
- Location: United Kingdom
- Key people: J. N. Bell, General Secretary
- Affiliations: TUC, NTWF, Labour Party

The National Amalgamated Union of Labour (NAUL) was a general union in the United Kingdom.

== History ==
The trade union was founded in Feb 1889 as the United Tyne and District Labourers Association and in March 1889 the Amalgamated Society of Shipyard Helpers and General Labourers of the River Wear merged with it. By 1890 the union was recruiting heavily in the London, Belfast and Barrow areas and absorbed the Sheffield and District Navvies and General Labourers Society and changed its name to the Tyneside and National Labour Union of Great Britain and Ireland. The Annual Delegate Meeting of 1892 voted to change its name to the National Amalgamated Union of Labour. By 1897, it claimed 22,397 members, making it the fourth-largest union in the UK. It affiliated to the Trades Union Congress in 1912.

While the union accepted all workers, most of its members were involved in shipbuilding, ship repair, and engineering. In North East England, it also represented the majority of dockers, and many iron and steel workers, while in South Yorkshire, it represented most surface workers at coal mines. In London, it represented many cement workers, and around the country it had a significant number of chemical workers, builders' labourers and tramway maintenance workers.

Following mergers with a large number of small trade unions, including the London and Counties Labour League, by 1919, the union had 148,000 members spread across the UK and was led by Joseph N. Bell. He formed the National Amalgamated Workers Union as a loose confederation with the Municipal Employees Association (MEA) and the Workers Union, but this dissolved in 1922, shortly before Bell's death. Membership peaked at 170,000 in 1920, but then dropped rapidly, falling to only 53,000 by 1924. Women were initially not permitted to join the union, but this policy was changed, and by 1921 it had 25,000 women members, but this fell dramatically to only 2,000 in 1924.

In 1924, the union merged with the National Union of General Workers and the MEA to form the National Union of General and Municipal Workers. Of the union's former delegates, Spence became Assistant General Secretary of the new union, while Alfred James Bailey, Sam Bradley and Tom Williamson became district secretaries.

== Election results ==
From 1914 to 1922, the union sponsored several candidates in Parliamentary elections:

Election	Party	Constituency	Candidate	Votes	%	Position
1914 by-election	Labour Party	Leith Burghs	Joseph Nicholas Bell	3,346	24.5	3
1918 general election	Independent Labour	Sheffield Central	Alfred James Bailey	5,959	37.3	2
1918 general election	Labour Party	Aberavon	Robert Williams	7,758	35.7	2
1918 general election	Labour Party	Widnes	Tom Williamson	7,821	40.4	2
1922 general election	Labour Party	Newcastle upon Tyne East	Joseph Nicholas Bell	10,084	43.1	1

== Leadership ==
=== General secretaries ===
1888: William Stanley
1891: Alfred T. Dipper
1898: J. N. Bell
1923: Ralph Spence

=== Corresponding secretaries ===
1888: J. N. Bell
1898: Ralph Spence
1923: Post vacant
