= Ralph Spence (trade unionist) =

British trade unionist

Ralph Spence (10 October 1869 – 12 May 1938) was a British trade unionist.

Born in Newcastle-upon-Tyne on 10 October 1869, Spence became interested in trade unionism in the early 1880s. As a result, he took a leading role in founding the Tyneside and District Labourers' Union in 1888. The union grew quickly, and was renamed as the National Amalgamated Union of Labour (NAUL). He was appointed as the union's Corresponding Secretary in 1898, and from 1912 represented the union at the Trades Union Congress.

In 1922, J. N. Bell, General Secretary of NAUL, died unexpectedly, and Spence was elected to succeed him. He took the union into a merger which formed the National Union of General and Municipal Workers, becoming one of the new union's first joint Assistant General Secretaries. He remained in this post until his retirement in 1935. Spence died on 12 May 1938, at the age of 68. Despite holding prominent positions in the movement, Spence was principally regarded as an effective administrator.

Trade union offices
Preceded by J. N. Bell	General Secretary of the National Amalgamated Union of Labour; 1923–1924	Succeeded by Position abolished
Preceded by New position	Assistant General Secretary of the National Union of General and Municipal Workers; 1924–1935; With: Peter Tevenan (1924–1932)	Succeeded by Position abolished
