= 1917 Australian conscription referendum =

- 20 December 1917
- Are you in favour of the proposal of the Commonwealth Government for reinforcing the Australian Imperial Force oversea?
- Outcome: Failed

Results
Choice	Votes	%
Yes	1,015,159	46.21%
No	1,181,747	53.79%
Valid votes	2,196,906	97.28%
Invalid or blank votes	61,315	2.72%
Total votes	2,258,221	100.00%
Registered voters/turnout	2,776,440	81.34%
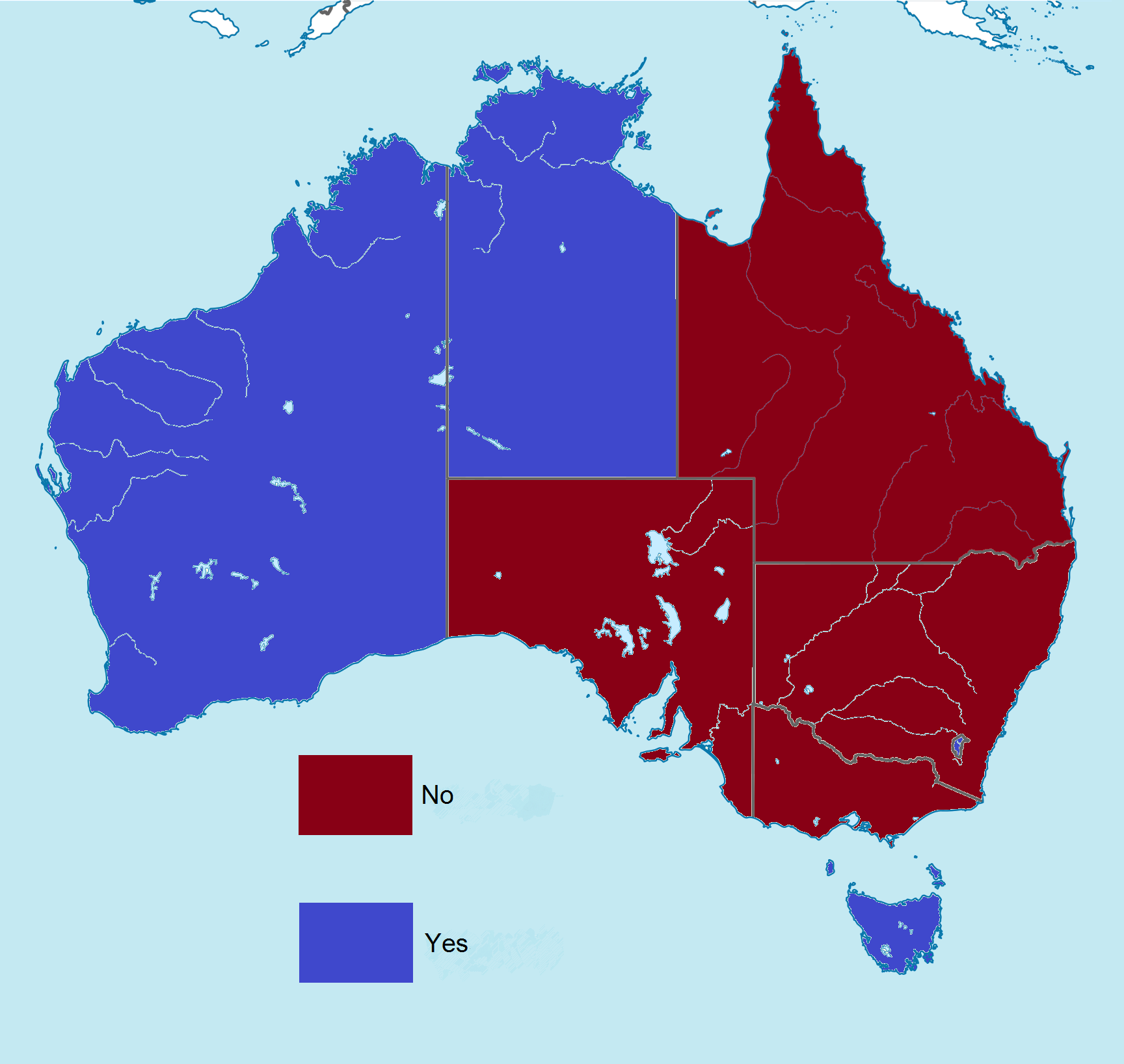
Results by state
Yes	No

The 1917 Australian referendum was held on 20 December 1917. It contained one question.

- Are you in favour of the proposal of the Commonwealth Government for reinforcing the Australian Imperial Force oversea?

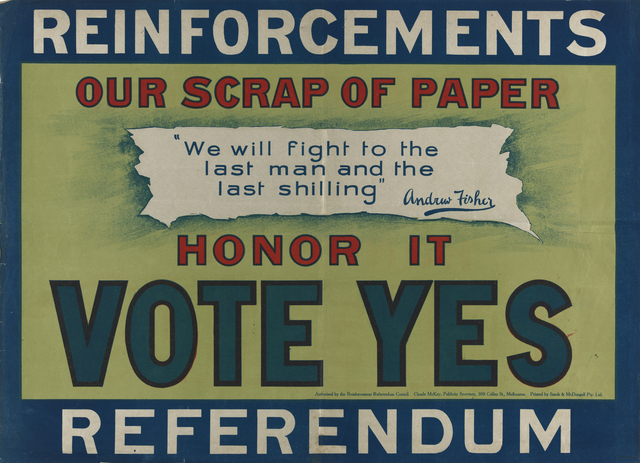
Poster for the Yes campaign 1917

== Background ==
The 1917 plebiscite was held a year after the highly contentious 1916 conscription plebiscite. The 1916 plebiscite had resulted in a surprise "no" vote, with voters in Queensland, New South Wales and South Australia, as well as a majority of electors nationwide, rejecting the proposal. The political fallout was swift and, by November 1916, had led to the collapse of the First Hughes Ministry. That was associated with a split in the ruling Australian Labor Party, with Prime Minister Billy Hughes and some Labor MPs forming the breakaway National Labor Party which, by February 1917, had merged with the conservative Commonwealth Liberal Party to form the Nationalist Party of Australia. While the Nationalist Party was dominated by former Commonwealth Liberals, it retained Hughes as leader. After Hughes and the Nationalists scored a convincing victory at the 1917 election, Hughes announced that a second plebiscite on the question of conscription would be held on 20 December 1917.

During the course of World War 1, 38.7% of eligible Australian men enlisted for service — around 420,000 out of an eligible population of a little over 1 million. During the war, the range of men eligible to volunteer was expanded, with the initial age range of 19–38 expanded to 18–45 in June 1915. At the same time, medical standards were lowered. For example, by April 1917 the minimum height had dropped from 5 ft 6 in (168 cm) in August 1914 to 5 ft (152 cm). Despite that, there was a marked decrease in the number of enlistments after 1915, with the average in 1917 being fewer than 4,000 per month:

- 1914: 52,561
- 1915: 165,912
- 1916: 124,352
- 1917: 45,101

== The 1917 plebiscite ==
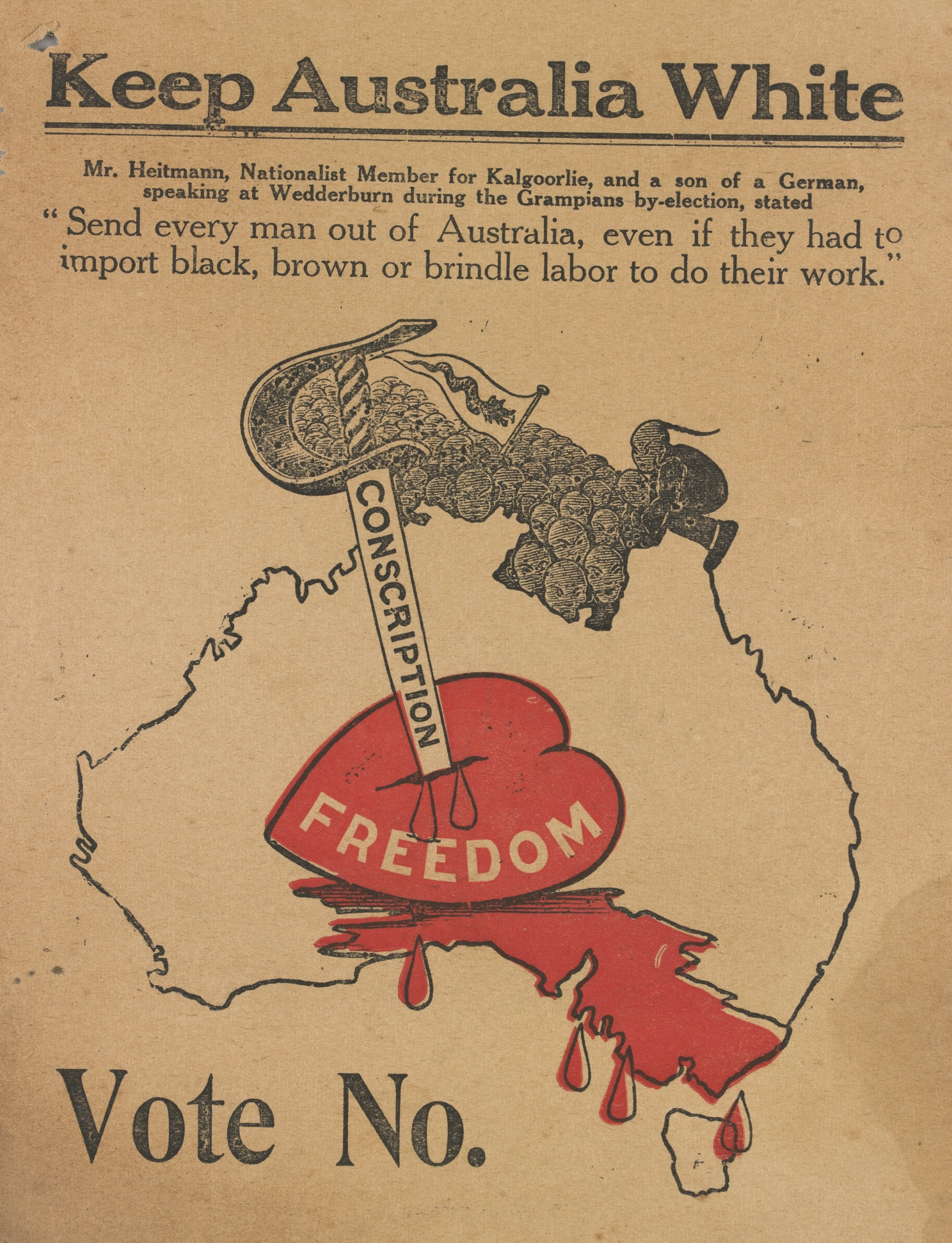
"Keep Australia White" poster used during the 1917 conscription referendum. The "No" campaign claimed that conscripted soldiers sent overseas would be replaced by non-white labour.

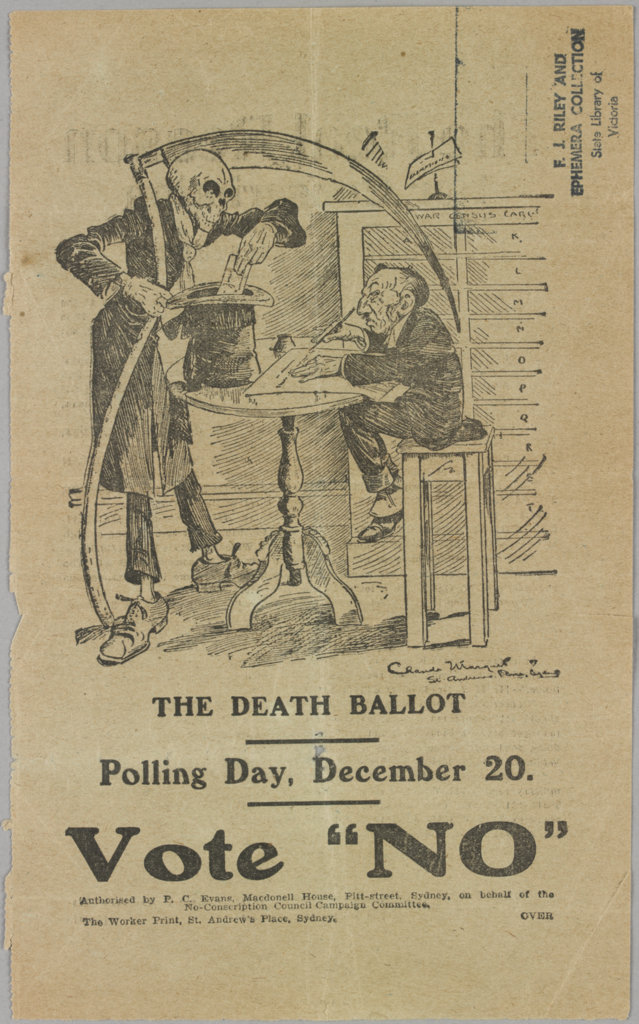
"The Death Ballot", a campaign poster for the "No" vote.

The proposal for the 1917 plebiscite was less far-reaching than that of the 1916 poll, eschewing full conscription of able-bodied men and instead proposing to conscript men between the ages of 18 and 44 through a ballot system, and only in months where voluntary enlistments fell below 7,000 men.

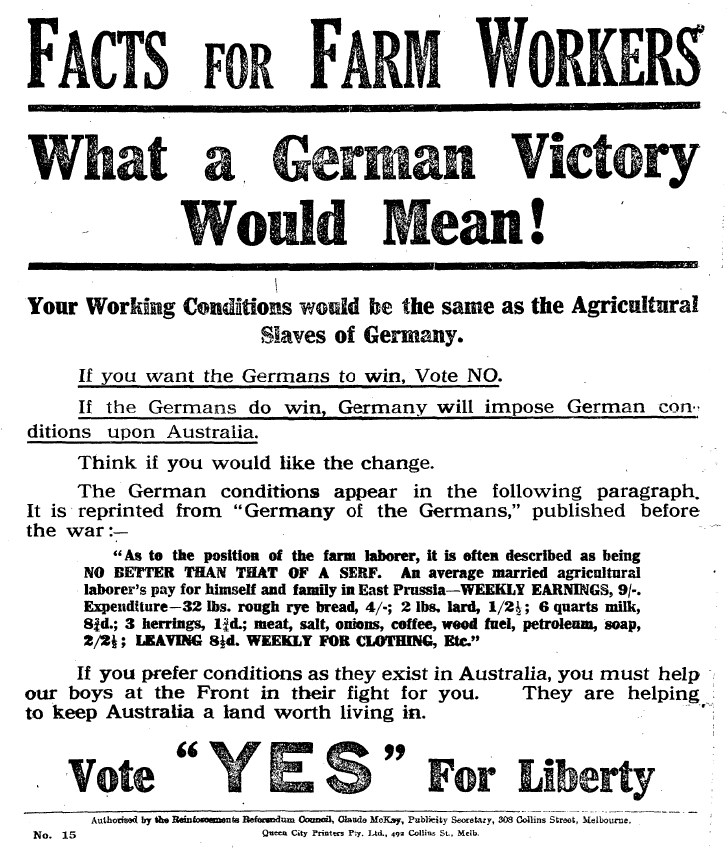
"Facts for Farm Workers", a campaign poster for the "Yes" vote.

The plebiscite was held due to the Australian Government's desire to increase the recruitment of forces for overseas service to a total of 7,000 men per month. It was conducted under the War Precautions (Military Service Referendum) Regulations 1917. It formed part of the larger debate on conscription in Australia throughout the war.

All of the historical documentation refers to the ballot as a referendum, even though it did not involve a proposal to amend the Australian Constitution. Because it was not an amendment to the constitution, (1) it had no legal force, (2) it did not require approval in a majority of states and (3) residents of federal territories were able to vote. (Note: People in the territories were not able to vote at a referendum to alter the Constitution until after the 1977 referendum.) Such a ballot is now usually referred to as a plebiscite to distinguish it from a referendum to alter the Constitution.

The campaign was notable for an incident in which a protester threw an egg at Prime Minister Hughes, in Warwick, Queensland, and for a raid on the Queensland Government Printing Office by Hughes, accompanied by a party of soldiers, who seized 3,300 copies of the Queensland Parliamentary Hansard which Hughes deemed to contain subversive anti-conscription speeches.

== Results ==
Despite the fact that the 1917 plebiscite was less far-reaching than the 1916 one, the anti-conscription vote won by a larger margin than it had in 1916. Every state and territory was less supportive of conscription in 1917 than it had been in 1916 with the sole exception of South Australia, which had become more supportive of conscription (although a majority still opposed it).

Results
State	Electoral roll	Ballots issued	For		Against		Informal
State	Electoral roll	Ballots issued	Vote	%	Vote	%	Informal
New South Wales	1,055,883	853,894	341,256	41.16	487,774	58.84	24,864
Victoria	807,331	678,806	329,772	49.79	332,490	50.21	16,544
Queensland	378,378	310,164	132,771	44.02	168,875	55.98	8,518
South Australia	261,661	197,970	86,663	44.90	106,364	55.10	4,943
Western Australia	162,347	135,593	84,116	64.39	46,522	35.61	4,955
Tasmania	106,803	78,792	38,881	50.24	38,502	49.76	1,409
Northern Territory and Federal Capital Territory	4,037	3,002	1,700	58.22	1,220	41.78	82
Total^{†}	2,776,440	2,258,221*	1,015,159	46.21	1,181,747	53.79	61,315
^{†}Including 199,677 votes by members of the Australian Imperial Force, of which 103,789 were for, 93,910 against, and 1,978 informal.
Results	Obtained an overall minority of 166,588 votes. (Note: As this was a plebiscite not a referendum to amend the Australian Constitution, there was no requirement for a majority of states.) Not carried						

== See also ==
- 1916 Australian conscription referendum
- Conscription in Australia
- World War I Conscription in Australia
- Australia in World War I
