= Joseph Nicholas Bell =

British politician

Joseph Nicholas Bell

Joseph Nicholas Bell (7 March 1864 – 17 December 1922) JP MP was a British Labour politician and Justice of the Peace. He was elected Member of Parliament for Newcastle East in the 1922 General Election, but died a month later.

For many years Bell was General Secretary of the National Amalgamated Union of Labour.

In 1896, Bell married Florence Harrison, a teacher and prominent Independent Labour Party activist.

He was first selected in 1914 as Labour candidate for Leith Burghs to contest the by-election when he came third. In 1918 he was selected for the Edinburgh seat of Leith, but was replaced later that year. He was then selected by the Labour Party to fight the Newcastle East constituency at the 1922 General Election. Already ill, he was unable to travel from London to campaign in the seat, but was elected in his absence, defeating the Coalition Liberal MP, Harry Barnes.

Bell died a month after his election, aged 58, and thus became one of only a handful of elected British MPs never to have taken their seats.

At the subsequent by-election Arthur Henderson held the seat for Labour.

== See also ==
- List of United Kingdom MPs with the shortest service

== Sources ==
- Leigh Rayment's Historical List of MPs

Parliament of the United Kingdom
Preceded by Harry Barnes	Member of Parliament for Newcastle East; 1922	Succeeded by Arthur Henderson
Trade union offices
Preceded by Alfred T. Dipper	General Secretary of the National Amalgamated Union of Labour; 1898–1922	Succeeded by Ralph Spence
Preceded by William John Davis	Chairman of the Annual Conference of the Labour Representation Committee; 1903	Succeeded by John Hodge
Preceded by David Gilmour and William Mosses	Trades Union Congress representative to the American Federation of Labour; 1906; With: Allan Gee	Succeeded by John Hodge and David Shackleton
