= Andrew Grant (politician) =

Scottish Liberal politician

Andrew Grant (13 June 1830 – 23 October 1924) was a Scottish merchant and Liberal politician who sat in the House of Commons from 1878 to 1885.

== Early life ==
Grant was born in Cassell's Place, Leith Walk, Leith, the elder of the twin sons of Jessie Ann Campbell of Achindoon, Argyllshire and her husband, Rev James Grant. His father was minister of South Leith Parish church and later (1854) was Moderator of the General Assembly of the Church of Scotland, and director of Scottish Widows from 1840 to 1890. His grandfather was Andrew Grant (minister) who had also been Moderator of the General Assembly. Grant was educated at Leith High School Edinburgh and the University of Edinburgh.

== Business career ==
In 1854 Grant went to China, where he lived for four years and then in 1858 went to Bombay, where he joined the firm of Campbell, Mitchell & Co. He became chairman of the company and was in business there as a merchant until 1866. He was a Fellow of the University of Bombay, twice chairman of the Bombay Chamber of Commerce, founder member and first chairman of the Royal Bank of India.

Grant returned to the UK in 1866, establishing himself in business, in Liverpool, until his retirement in 1873, aged 42. In 1875 he took the Invermay estate at Forteviot, Perthshire, for his first country seat. Invermay was one of the many country estates of Lord Clinton, Baron Fortescue.

Grant was a Fellow of the Royal Geographical Society.

== Political career ==
In 1878, Grant was invited to stand as Liberal candidate for Leith Burghs. He was elected Member of Parliament for Leith Burghs at a by-election in 1878, holding the seat for the Liberals, with a majority of 3141. In the General Election of 1880 he was returned unopposed. He represented the constituency until he retired in 1885. He was a well-respected politician, who much considered the well-being of his constituents.

== Later life ==
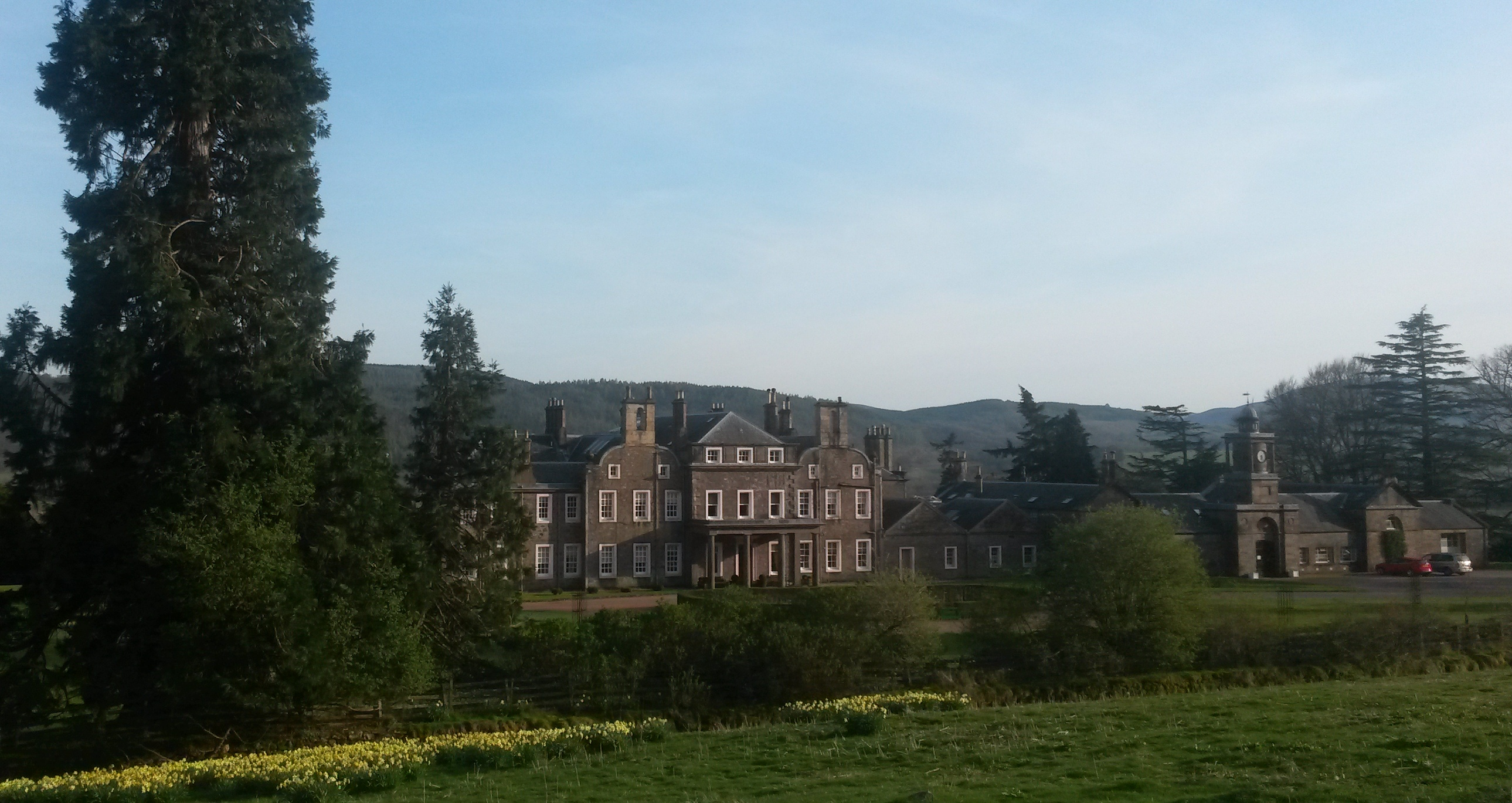
Lawers House

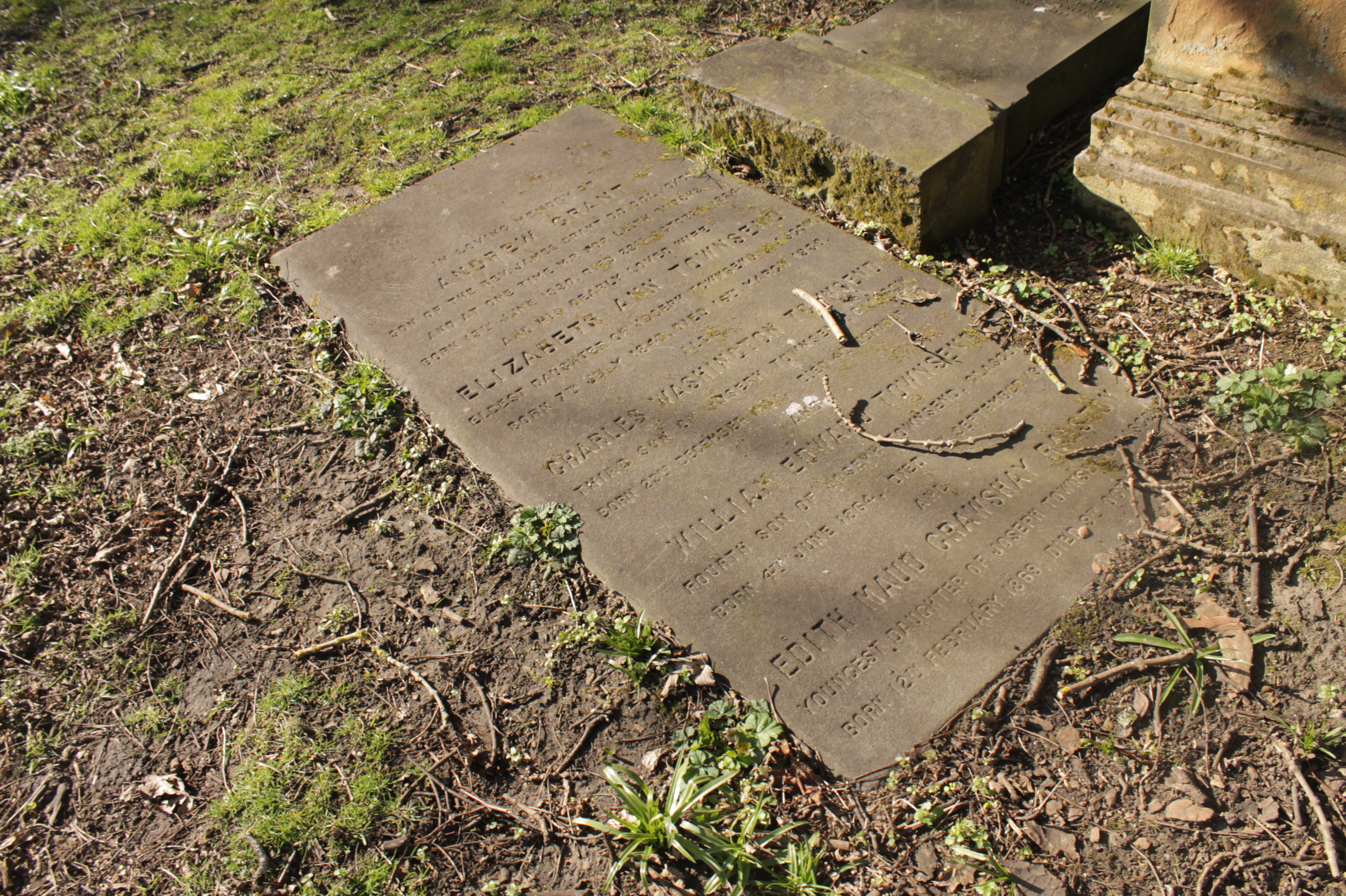
The grave of Andrew Grant MP, Warriston Cemetery

In 1894 Grant rented from the Williamsons of Balgray and Lawers, the estate of Lawers, an early 19th-century house which had been remodelled and extended to the design of Richard Crighton. Early in 1901, the Grants took Pitcorthie in Fife, a large and elegant mansion built for George Simson of Brunton and Pitcorthie, circa 1820 and which is particularly similar in style to both Camperdown House, Dundee and Balbirnie, Markinch. Grant gave £10,000 towards the new building for the Edinburgh College of Art constructed between 1907 and 1909.

He retired in 1890 to the huge Lawers House in central Perthshire. In 1901 he moved to the even grander Pitcorthie House, west of Anstruther in Fife.

Grant died at Pitcorthie House, on 23 October 1924 and was buried at Warriston Cemetery, Edinburgh (Compartment “B” Number 7) next to the memorials to his parents and to his brother, Colin. The grave lies north of the main upper east-west path near its midpoint.

His published will in respect of his £607,000 unsettled estate, revealed that he had left in the region of £350,000 for the foundation of what he stipulated was to be known as The Andrew Grant Bequest, to benefit students of Edinburgh College of Art, in the form of travelling scholarships. The Bequest was activated in 1930, with the death of Grant's widow, Elizabeth and has a fund of over £3.5 million today.

== Family ==
Grant married Elizabeth Ann Townsend (1840-1936) of Glasgow in 1872. She was the daughter of Joseph Townsend, of 15 Grosvenor Terrace in Glasgow, a manufacturing chemist with a large premises in Port Dundas. Grant had a close relationship with his twin brother, Colin Campbell Grant, WS, afterwards barrister-at-law, Middle Temple, who died suddenly at Richmond, Surrey on 30 April 1902.

== Notes ==
- Andrew Grant's Will (codicil dated 12 September 1911) Will 58 pages in total.
- "The London Times" newspaper dated Saturday, 27 December 1924 (Wills & Bequests - Scottish Merchant's Fortune.
- The Edinburgh College of Art - my various correspondence with the Principal and Secretary of that institution over the last decade.
- "The Bankers' Magazine" Volume 23. .
- "The Bankers' Magazine" 1381 Bombay Chamber of Commerce.
- "Business Corporations in India, 1851 - 1900".
- "Parliamentary Papers" Volume 9 by Great Britain Parliament House of Commons.
- "The Argus" Friday, 11 November 1864 (Royal Bank of India).
- "Who's Who of British Members of Parliament.
- "The Bombay University Calendar For The Year 1866 - 1867.
- Birth, Death and Marriage certificates

Parliament of the United Kingdom
Preceded by Donald Robert Macgregor	Member of Parliament for Leith Burghs	Succeeded by William Jacks
