= Donald Robert Macgregor =

Donald Robert Macgregor (1824 – 9 December 1889) was a Scottish politician. From 1874 to 1878 he was a Liberal Member of Parliament (MP) for the Leith Burghs constituency, near Edinburgh.

== Life ==
He was born in Perth the son of Lt Evan Macgregor and was educated at the Public School in Perth. He was apprenticed to the firm of William Allan & Co, timber merchants in Leith where he lived at 13 Bernard Street as an insurance agent.

In 1841 when William Allan & Co was dissolved he set up on his own as shipbroker also being a merchant and steamship owner in Leith. He traded with the Baltic and Australia and also ran a fleet between Scotland and Russia.

He was Colonel of the Leith Volunteer Corps, 1st Midlothian Rifles, in succession to Col. Henry Arnaud HEICS.

In 1855 he lived at 18 Minto Street in Newington, Edinburgh. In 1874 he defeated Robert Andrew Macfie to become MP for Leith Burghs. In 1878 he left Leith to take the seat of the Chiltern Hundreds. He died in "Saint Bothwell" (sic) on 6 December 1889.

== Family ==
He was married to Mary Anderson of Woodburn House in south Edinburgh (previously from Newcastle) who predeceased him. They had no children.

From 1875 (possibly following the death of Mary's brother who had remained at Woodburn House) they moved as a married couple to Woodburn House in south Edinburgh.

Parliament of the United Kingdom
Preceded by Robert Andrew Macfie	Member of Parliament for Leith Burghs; 1874–1878	Succeeded by Andrew Grant
