= Dates of establishment of diplomatic relations with Francoist Spain =

Diplomatic recognition of Francoist Spain

The Spanish Civil War was fought from 17 July 1936 until the victory of the Nationalist faction on 1 April 1939. After the end of the war, the Spanish Republic formed a government-in-exile in Paris and Mexico City. Between the start of the civil war and Spanish transition to democracy and the reconciliation with the Spanish Republican government in exile in 1977, nations decided when, how, and if they recognised Francoist Spain as the legitimate government of Spain.

== Americas ==
Country	Established	Notes
Chile	5 April 1939	After Chile recognised the nationalist government in April 1939, the two countries were immediately embroiled in a conflict surrounding the status of Republican refugees seeking asylum in Chile. Spain ended diplomatic relations with Chile on 17 July 1940, after the two countries failed to resolve the matter, though relations were restored on 12 October 1940 after Brazil and Italy mediated the dispute.
Guatemala		The Republican government was recognised as the only legitimate government of Spain by Guatemala in March 1946.
Mexico	28 March 1977	The Republican government was recognised as the only legitimate government of Spain by Mexico on 25 August 1945. Mexico reestablished diplomatic relations only after the death of Francisco Franco. By 1975, within the United Nations, only Yugoslavia and Mexico still recognised, and hosted an embassy to, the Spanish Republican government in exile.
Panama	18 March 1953	The Republican government was recognised as the only legitimate government of Spain by Panama in March 1946. Relations were soon reestablished as the two countries signed a Treaty of Friendship on 18 March 1953.
Peru	February 1939	Relations were severed in March 17, 1938, but after General Francisco Franco took power, relations were reestablished in February and both nations reopened their embassies in June.
United States	27 December 1950	On 1 April 1939, the United States lifted the embargoes placed on Spain, providing limited recognition to the regime, and the embassy to Spain, previously in Barcelona, now headed by a Chargé d’Affaires ad interim, was moved back to Madrid on the 13th. In the aftermath of World War II, public opinion on the Franco regime was low, with most seeing the state as collaborationist with Nazi Germany and President Harry S. Truman being opposed to the reestablishment of formal diplomatic relations. However, as the Cold War began, and with Spanish agents, US military officials, and US businessmen lobbying for the opening of relations, popular opinion shifted. The appointment of a US ambassador to Madrid was announced on 27 December 1950. In July 1951, negotiations started for an alliance which would eventually become the Pact of Madrid.
Venezuela		The Republican government was recognised as the only legitimate government of Spain by Venezuela in March 1946.

== Asia ==
Country	Established	Notes
People's Republic of China	9 March 1973	On 9 March 1973, Spain established relations with the People's Republic of China and severed relations with the Republic of China.
Republic of China	1952	During World War II, Beijing was reluctant to establish relations with Madrid, and in 1946 the Spanish Legation in China was officially closed. The situation improved after the Korean War started, leading to formal relations being established in 1952, with a friendship agreement being signed in February 1953. On 9 March 1973, formal diplomatic relations between the two nations were suspended, as Spain recognised the People's Republic of China instead.
Japan	1 December 1937	Japan recognised the Francoist government of Spain in exchange for German, Spanish, and Italian recognition of Manchukuo. Spain declared a rupture in relations on 12 April 1945, which were reestablished in 1952.
Kampuchea	5 May 1977	Relations with Kampuchea were only established after the death of Francisco Franco.
Manchukuo	2 December 1937	In October 1938, a friendship legation arrived from the Japanese puppet state Manchukuo (later part of the People's Republic of China since 1949), and a treaty of friendship was signed in 1939.
Mongolia	4 July 1977	Relations with Mongolia were only established after the death of Francisco Franco.
Philippines	27 September 1947	Legations were established in 1947 following the signing of a bilateral friendship treaty on 27 September 1947.
Thailand	February 1949	The first permanent representative of Spain arrived in Bangkok in February 1949, and a Treaty of Friendship was signed in 1952.
Vietnam	1950	

== Europe ==
Country	Established	Notes
Albania		The Republican government was recognised as the only legitimate government of Spain by Albania December 1946.
Bulgaria	27 January 1970	The Republican government was recognised as the only legitimate government of Spain by Bulgaria on 30 November 1946. Relations were restored on 27 January 1970.
Czechoslovakia	28 January 1939	Government of Rudolf Beran recognized Francoist Government on 28 January 1939. The Republican government was recognised as the only legitimate government of Spain by Czechoslovakia on 22 August 1946.
France	27 February 1939	France and Britain together unconditionally recognised the nationalist government on 27 February 1939.
Germany	18 November 1936	See also: German involvement in the Spanish Civil War Germany and Italy together recognised the nationalist government on 18 November 1936. After World War II, Germany was split into West Germany and East Germany. On 10 January 1973, The East Germany became the first communist country to recognise Francoist Spain.
Hungary	February 1938	The Hungarian state led by Miklós Horthy recognised Franco's government in February 1938. After World War II ended, the Republican government was recognised as the only legitimate government of Spain by the Hungarian People's Republic on 28 July 1946. Relations were reestablished with Madrid on 9 January 1977, after Franco had died.
Ireland	11 February 1939	See also: Ireland and the Spanish Civil War and Irish Socialist Volunteers in the Spanish Civil War
Italy	18 November 1936	See also: Italian military intervention in Spain Germany and Italy together recognised the nationalist government on 18 November 1936.
Poland	February 1939	The Second Polish Republic recognised the Franco government in February 1939, after the United Kingdom and France had already done so. After the World War II, the Republican government was recognised as the only legitimate government of Spain by the Polish People's Republic on 5 April 1946. Relations were restored after the death of Franco on 31 January 1977.
Portugal	11 May 1938	Portugal had ended formal relations with the Spanish Republic in October 1936 and appointed diplomatic agents to Nationalist Spain in December 1937. In 1939, Portugal would go on to sign the Iberian Pact, formalising the friendship between Portugal and Francoist Spain.
Romania	5 January 1967	The Republican government was recognised as the only legitimate government of Spain by Romania on 21 May 1946. Relations were restored on 5 January 1967.
Soviet Union	9 February 1977	The Soviet Union fully supported the Republican government in the Civil War. After World War II and throughout the Cold War, relations were maintained informally through offices in Paris and economic ties. After the death of Francisco Franco, Spain and the Soviet Union established formal relations and exchanged embassies on 9 February 1977.
Switzerland	14 February 1939	Switzerland sent a diplomatic agent to Franco on 3 May 1938, and a representative from the Francoist government had been tolerated and granted privileges in Bern since 1937. All this meant that on 24 November 1938, Rab Butler described relationship between the two entities as "de facto recognition". Switzerland extended full recognition on 14 February 1939, becoming the first democratic country to do so.
United Kingdom	27 February 1939	In November 1937, the British government exchanged agents with the Franco government, a move criticised by Clement Attlee as "de facto recognition of the insurgent government", though a government communiqué stressed that this did not constitute recognition. France and Britain together unconditionally recognised the nationalist government on 27 February 1939. The Labour Party opposed the recognition, with Clement Attlee calling it "a gross betrayal... two and a half years of hypocritical pretense of non-intervention".
Vatican City	June 1938	Francoist Spain proclaimed itself a Catholic nation on 30 October 1936, hoping to win the support of the Vatican, which did not extend formal recognition. On 1 July 1937, the Letters of the Spanish Hierarchy were published, which detailed the Spanish Church's position on the war and stated that the Church endorsed Franco's forces. In August, Pablo Churruca was serving as chargé d'affaires in Rome, which the Francoist press described as having "the status of official diplomatic representative" but the Vatican insisted that this was not formal recognition, though in September 1937, the Vatican had sent a chargé to Burgos, and in June 1938 full diplomatic recognition was established.
Yugoslavia	27 January 1977	The Republican government was recognised as the only legitimate government of Spain by Yugoslavia on 13 April 1946. By 1975, within the United Nations, only Yugoslavia and Mexico still recognised, and hosted an embassy to, the Spanish Republican government in exile. Yugoslavia established relations with Spain in 1977, after the death of Francisco Franco. Fernando Olivié González-Pumariega was the first ambassador of Spain in Belgrade.

== Oceania ==
Country	Established	Notes
Australia	26 October 1967	Australia, was officially neutral during the Civil War. However, over 66 Australians volunteered and fought for the Republican faction in Spain as part of the British Battalion. Formal diplomatic relations were officially established on 26 October 1967, with the Spanish opening an embassy in Canberra on 3 May 1968.
New Zealand	28 March 1969	Volunteers from New Zealand assisted the Republican Faction in the Civil War. Formal diplomatic relations were officially established on 28 March 1969.

== See also ==
- International response to the Spanish Civil War
- Spanish question (United Nations)
