= Irish involvement in the Spanish Civil War =

Memorial to Limerick men who fought in the International Brigades, erected outside Limerick City Hall in 2014.

The Spanish Civil War lasted from July 17, 1936 to April 1, 1939. While both sides in the Spanish Civil War attracted participants from Ireland, the majority sided with the Nationalist faction.

== Support for the Nationalists ==
Feeling in Ireland in the 1930s ran overwhelmingly against the Second Spanish Republic due to the opposition by the Catholic Church.

Following the July coup by the generals in Spain, a wave of atrocities swept the country on both sides; in Republican Spain, the Red Terror was, in part, directed against the Church there. Ireland was awash with atrocity stories, leading to proposals to form a crusade to protect the Church and fight against the Spanish Republic.

In Ireland, the issue was presented in stark contrasts. Intermediate shades received little toleration. The Catholic church, arguably coming to the height of its conservatism, portrayed the war as a struggle between Christ and anti-Christ. Religion was under attack. Christian civilisation was mortally imperilled by the poison of communism. Innumerable sermons dinned home the dubious tenet that whatever opposed the onrush of communism was good. A joint pastoral of the Irish bishops firmly supported Franco.

Encouraged by the Church hierarchy, Eoin O'Duffy, leader of the fascist NCP, started to recruit a brigade of Irish volunteers to fight in Spain in defence of the church. By late 1936 some 7,000 men had volunteered, of whom about 700 were selected, and in November 1936 these sailed to Spain, where they became the XV Bandera (battalion) of the Spanish Foreign Legion, or "Irish Brigade".

However, the Brigade became something of a political football: Franco was at first keen to have it, as a way of cementing control over the Requetes, the catholic monarchist militia of Navarre, but once this was achieved the brigade's presence was at odds with the Nationalists emphasis on "Spanishness". On the other hand, O'Duffy's purpose for the Brigade was not so much to support Spain as to enhance his own reputation in Ireland, and restore his political fortunes there.

Militarily the Brigade achieved little; in its first action, near Ciempozuelos in February 1937, the Brigade was involved in a friendly fire incident with a Falangist unit while advancing to the front. Four brigaders and up to nine Falangists were killed in the exchange of fire. Shortly after, at Titulcia in March 1937 the Brigade refused to advance after taking casualties and was withdrawn. Irish brigade members witnessed the brutal execution of Soviet prisoners, during which they shouted "Stalin!" in defiance as Nationalist executioners shot each member from the leg up. Following months of inactivity in a quiet sector sapped morale and saw an erosion of discipline; the unit was finally sent home in July 1937.

== Support for the Spanish Republic ==
Support for the Spanish Republic was organized through various left-wing organizations, though it was limited by the actions in Spain against the Catholic Church. Harry Midgley, the leader of the NILP, spoke out against Franco, but lost support amongst his constituents and in 1938 his seat in the Northern Ireland parliament because of this.

In September 1936 a decision was made in Paris by the Third Communist International to form an International Brigade of volunteers to fight with the Republicans. Recruiting in Ireland was organised by the Communist Party of Ireland: Chief organizers of this effort were Sean Murray, Peadar O'Donnell, and Frank Ryan. In all 320 Irish men served with the International Brigades, a quarter of whom were killed in action. Some were involved with underground unions, some were opposed to O'Duffy's Blueshirts and Greenshirts in Ireland, while others believed that fascism threatened Ireland. One of those was Michael O'Riordan, the future head of the Communist Party of Ireland. O'Riordan took part in all the battles of the 15th International Brigade in support of the Spanish Republican Army, including the Battle of the Ebro, at which he was wounded.

In late 1936 Frank Ryan travelled to Spain with about 80 men to fight in the International Brigades on the Republican side. Ryan's men are sometimes referred to as the "Connolly Column". As part of the XV International Brigade the Connollys fought in the battles of Jarama, Brunete and Belchite in 1937, and at Teruel, Gandesa and the Ebro in 1938.

Ryan himself rose to the rank of Brigadier, was seriously wounded in March 1937 at Jarama, and was captured in March 1938 on the Ebro. He was tried and sentenced to death, though this was later commuted to thirty years hard labour in January 1940.

As part of an international agreement, the Spanish republican government called upon the International Brigades to withdraw in 1938. The Connollys returned to Ireland, where many were treated as pariahs for their efforts.

Following the death of Michael O'Riordan in Dublin on 18 May 2006, Bob Doyle was the last Irishman alive to have fought for the International Brigade until his death on 23 January 2009. Paddy Cochrane (Born 11 March 1913 in Dublin), who served as a medic, died on 31 March 2011 aged 98, the last Irish non-combatant.

== Legacy ==
Fearghal McGarry, writing for RTÉ, has noted:
"The Spanish Civil War is now remembered in Ireland as a conflict between democracy and fascism rather than Christianity and communism. As a result, the veterans of the International Brigades have gradually come to be regarded as heroes, while the Irish Brigade's crusaders have been forgotten or are reviled as supporters of fascism. Such are the vagaries of history."

== See also ==
- Connolly Column
- Foreign involvement in the Spanish Civil War
- Ireland–Spain relations
- Irish Brigade (Spanish Civil War)
- Irish Christian Front - raised money for the Nationalists, attempted to get the Irish government to officially recognise Franco's regime
- Irish Socialist Volunteers in the Spanish Civil War
- Politics, a poem by W. B. Yeats

== Publications ==
- McGarry, Fearghal, Irish Politics and the Spanish Civil War, Cork: Cork University Press, 1999. ISBN 1-85918-239-9
- Stradling, Robert, The Irish and the Spanish Civil War 1936-1939. Crusades in Conflict, Manchester: Manchester University Press, ISBN 0-7190-5153-3

== Sources ==
- O'Riordan, Michael. Connolly Column: The story of the Irishmen who fought for the Spanish Republic 1936–1939. Dublin: New Books, 1979. ISBN (none)
- Othen, Christopher. Franco's International Brigades, London: Reportage Press, 2008, ISBN 978-0-9558302-6-6
