= The Spanish Civil War and the British Left =

The Spanish Civil War and the British Left: Political Activism and the Popular Front
- Author: Lewis H. Mates
- Language: English
- Subject: Spanish Civil War
- Published: 2007 (Tauris Academic Studies)
- Publication place: United Kingdom
- Media type: Print
- Pages: 292
- ISBN: 0857716948

The Spanish Civil War and the British Left: Political Activism and the Popular Front is a 2007 book by Lewis H. Mates.

== Overview ==
Mates uses archival research and an analysis of local newspapers to offer an account of the effects of the Spanish Civil War on North East England. Though the North East did not historically have a significant radical left presence, it nonetheless saw a significant mobilisation in support of the Spanish Republic.

Mates uses the case study of the North East to test assumptions about the British response to the Civil War, and argues that the popular front strategy pursued by the Communist Party of Great Britain (CPGB) was inadequate and a distraction from the need to end the policy of non-intervention. He also contends with the "popular frontist" assumption that the popular front was the best means available for British people to support the Spanish Republic, instead arguing that direct action in the form of mass strikes would have been more successful in placing pressure on the British government to intervene. The popular front strategy, Mates writes, was "inimical to providing the Spanish Republic with what it needed to fight Franco".

== Critical reception ==
Tom Buchanan, writing in The English Historical Review, questioned Mates's commentary on working-class Catholics' reactions to the Red Terror and the lack of the detail offered on topics including aid initiatives, but described the book as " a valuable addition to the burgeoning literature on Britain and the Spanish Civil War, and one that deserves to be read alongside—and as a corrective to—the 'national' studies." In History, Paul Corthorn questioned Mates's account of the influence of the "popular frontist" interpretation of events, but praised his engagement with Buchanan on the question of Catholics and described the book as "a carefully researched examination" with "much to commend it." Julius Ruiz, in The Historical Journal, described The Spanish Civil War and the British Left as "a significant addition to the historiography" and praised Mates's discussion of the impact of the popular front strategy on the CPGB, but took issue with his belief that industrial action could have proved a better strategy or succeeded in changing government policy.

== See also ==
- Foreign involvement in the Spanish Civil War
