= Irish Brigade (Spanish Civil War) =

- The Saint Patrick's Saltire flag of the Irish Brigade.
- Active: 1936–1937
- Country: Irish Free State
- Allegiance: Nationalist Spain
- Type: Infantry
- Size: 700 troops
- Garrison/HQ: Cáceres, Spain
- Nickname: Blueshirts
- Engagements: Spanish Civil War: Battle of Jarama

Commanders
- Notable commanders: Eoin O'Duffy

Insignia
- Badge of the Irish Brigade

The Irish Brigade (Spanish: Brigada Irlandesa, Irish: Briogáid na hÉireann) fought on the Nationalist side of Francisco Franco during the Spanish Civil War. The unit was formed wholly of Roman Catholics by the politician Eoin O'Duffy, who had previously organised the banned quasi-fascist Blueshirts and openly fascist Greenshirts in Ireland. Despite the declaration by the Irish government that participation in the war was unwelcome and ill-advised, 700 of O'Duffy's followers went to Spain. They saw their primary role in Spain as fighting for the Roman Catholic Church against the Red Terror of Spanish anticlericalists. They also saw many religious and historical parallels in the two nations, and hoped to prevent communism gaining ground in Spain.

== Initial involvement ==
The Irish Catholic primate Cardinal Joseph MacRory was approached in early August 1936 by the Spanish nationalist Count Ramírez de Arellano, a Carlist from Navarre, for help for the Nationalist rebels. MacRory suggested that O'Duffy was the best man to help, as his politics were supportive and he had organised the enormous Dublin Eucharistic Congress in 1932. In 1935 O'Duffy had formed the National Corporate Party, a small fascist group, and hoped that its involvement in Spain would increase its popular vote. He travelled to Spain later in 1936 to meet Franco and Ramírez, promising that 5,000 volunteers would follow him.

Franco's desire for Irish support changed in an opportunist manner. Early in the war, when Franco was one of a group of rebel generals, he felt that encouraging Irish involvement would cement his support from the equally religious-minded Carlist groups, and so ensure his leadership of the Nationalists. By December 1936 he was certain of the Carlists' support, and thereafter played down the need for Irish volunteers.

== Support for the brigade ==
Support for Irish involvement was based primarily on the Catholic ethos of most Irish people, as distinct from their opinion on Spanish politics per se. Many Irish Independent newspaper editorials endorsed the idea, and on 10 August 1936 it published a letter from O'Duffy seeking assistance for his "anti-Red Crusade". The Catholic Church was naturally on his side. Cardinal McRory stated 'There is no room any longer for any doubts as to the issue at stake in the Spanish conflict...It is a question of whether Spain will remain as she has been so long, a Christian and Catholic land, or a Bolshevist and anti-God one.' Many local government County Councils passed resolutions in support, starting with Clonmel on 21 August.

However, the Irish government and senior civil servants were dismayed by the Church's militant position on the war in Spain, one official in the Department of External Affairs describing it as 'not very helpful guidance' and worrying about the involvement of Irish citizens in 'a foreign war of this terrible character'. The Irish leader de Valera remained strictly neutral, and, despite the opposition of the Fine Gael party, but with the support of the Labour Party, signed Ireland up to the multi-national Non-Intervention Committee in February 1937. In late 1936 de Valera's publicist Aodh de Blácam wrote "For God and Spain; the Truth about the Spanish War", in support of Franco.

Rallies were also held around the country in support of Franco by a Catholic organisation named the Irish Christian Front, including a mass meeting of 40,000 people in Cork city, where some rioting broke out between Republican and pro-Franco supporters.

This support was mirrored outside the Irish Free State. In the United States, many in the largely Catholic Irish American community figured amongst those who supported Franco and the rebels. In 1937 Joseph Kennedy successfully led a campaign to oppose a proposal in the US Congress to allow sales of arms to the Spanish Republic. In Northern Ireland, support was so strong in the Catholic minority that it largely abandoned the Northern Ireland Labour Party, whose leader Harry Midgley supported the Spanish Republic. Midgley was greeted at one party meeting with chants of "we want Franco".

== Volunteers ==
In late 1936 some 7,000 men volunteered, of whom about 700 eventually went to Spain. While many of the officers were aligned with O'Duffy's political party, the majority of his force were not NCP members but former Blueshirts still loyal to the general. Some were former IRA or National Army men, like O'Duffy veterans of the pro-Treaty side of the Irish Civil War. But many others were young and naive, the Irish Department of External Affairs described them as 'very young men, who have been enticed from their families by the impression that they are going to fight for Christianity'. One author has described some of the Brigade as 'social misfits who saw themselves as the twentieth century's Wild Geese, and rural lads talked into enlistment by rhetoric from the pulpit. According to Matt Doolan, an ex-brigader, "the Irish Brigade was a very fair cross-section of Irish life of the period, including a number of prominent members of the Old IRA."

By now Franco was less keen on having an Irish Brigade, and O'Duffy had difficulty persuading him to arrange a ship to transport his men; a ship expected in October was cancelled. 200 travelled to Spain in small groups, and eventually 500 others embarked on the German ship Urundi at Galway in November 1936. Large crowds gathered to sing 'Faith of Our Fathers' as volunteers were blessed by priests and handed Sacred Heart badges, miraculous medals and prayer books. One of O'Duffy's associates, Liam Walsh had secured a commitment from Nazi Germany to send the Urundi to pick up the Irish volunteers. It docked at Ferrol in December 1936.

== Training and deployment ==
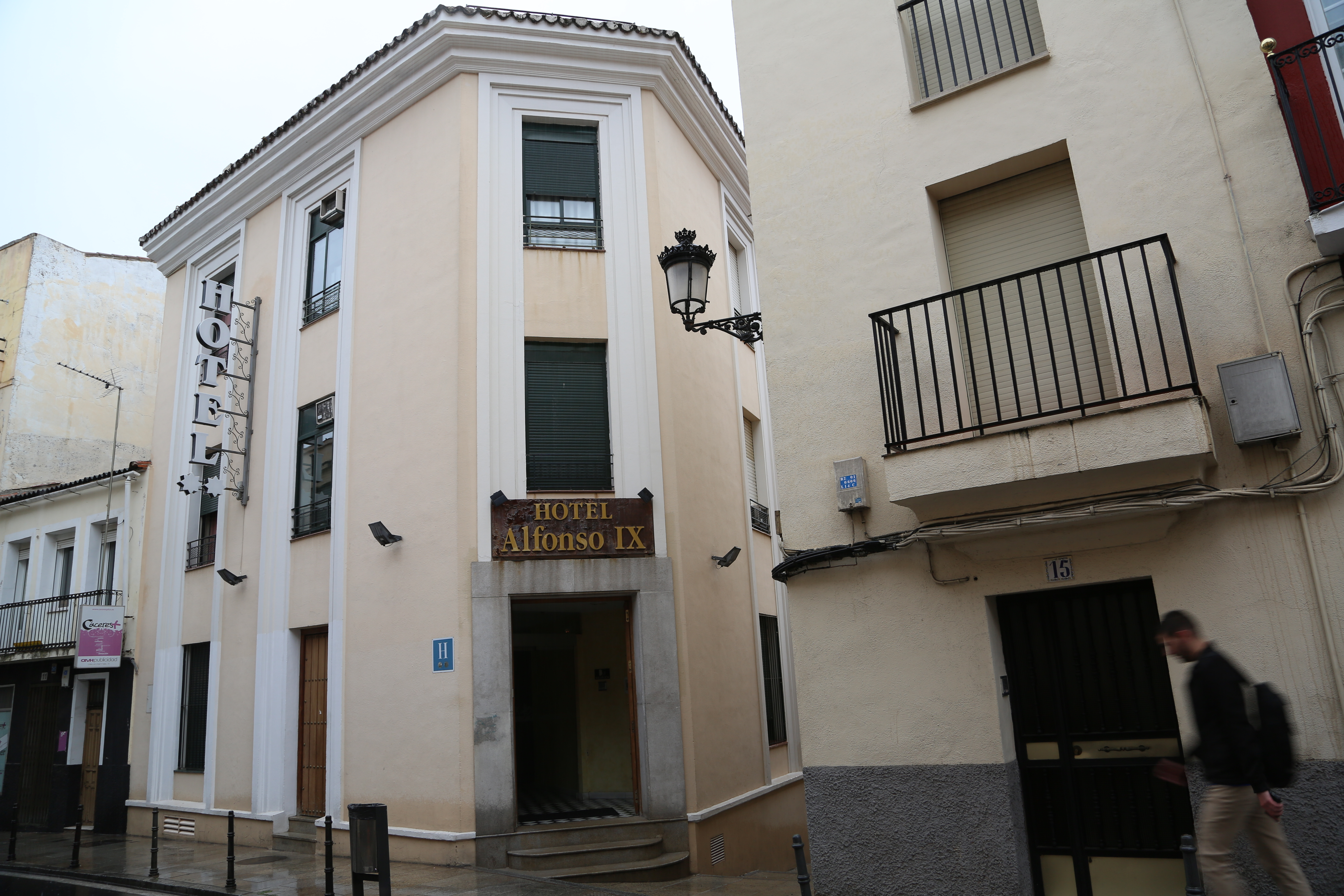
Hotel Álvarez—later named Alfonso IX—where O'Duffy lived while training in Cáceres.

From their training base at Cáceres the volunteers were attached to the Spanish Foreign Legion as its "XV Bandera" (roughly, "fifteenth battalion"), divided in four companies. Their uniforms were German ones dyed a light green, with silver harp badges. Two of their officers, Fitzpatrick and Nangle, were Irishmen who had formerly served as officers in the British Army; O'Duffy suspected that they were actually in the employ of the British government, and in turn Fitzpatrick considered O'Duffy to be "a shit".

At Cáceres, the Brigade's discipline and in particular their excessive drinking was strongly criticized by their Spanish superiors. There was also dissension between the volunteers and their Chaplain, Father Mulrean, who made himself unpopular due to his public berating of the Irishmen for their 'immoral' behaviour in front of Spanish officers.

Many of the volunteers also witnessed mass executions by the machine gunning of captured republicans at Caceres, one recalling, 'we saw General Franco's army executing the Reds in mass groups every morning'.

On 19 February 1937, the Irish Brigade was deployed to the Jarama battle area, as part of the right flank at Ciempozuelos, but when approaching the front line they were fired upon by a newly formed and allied Falangist unit from the Canary Islands. In an hour-long exchange of friendly fire 2 Irish brigaders and up to 9 Spanish Falangists were killed.

Most of the Brigade's time at the front was spent manning the trenches at Ciempozuelos, where, according to one volunteer, 'we never saw the Reds but were often under Red artillery fire'. Casualties due to artillery and mortar fire as well as disease and ill health mounted steadily. In its only offensive action, against the village of Titulcia in a rainstorm, six brigaders were killed and 15 wounded before they retired to their own trenches; the following day the brigade refused to continue the attack and was placed in defensive positions at La Maranosa nearby. These were the only two incidents the brigade was involved in where fighting took place.

== Mixed reputation ==
As Franco no longer needed the brigade for political reasons, he never sent a second ship for the next 600 volunteers who had assembled in Galway in January 1937. In February, the prospect of more Irish reinforcements arriving was precluded by the de Valera government passing a law prohibiting any more volunteers to leave for Spain to fight for either side.

The brigaders in Spain had a problem coping with oily food and the unaccustomed profusion of good wine. In April 1937 O'Duffy's adjutant Captain Gunning made off with the wages and a number of passports. O'Duffy's men started to nickname him "O'Scruffy" and "Old John Bollocks". One Brigade member noted in his diary that morale was collapsing, 'Bandera cracking up – all men are getting sick & weak, dozens going to hospital each day...great rumours about going home.

Meanwhile, after the failed assault on Titulcia, the Francoist general Juan Yagüe wrote to Franco reporting that due to 'the total lack of professional commanders... the military efficiency of this unit is absolutely nil' and recommending that the Irish Brigade be dissolved, with those who wanted to serve in other units accommodated and with the rest repatriated to Ireland.

== Withdrawal and reaction ==
O'Duffy then offered to withdraw his unit, and Franco agreed. The new Foreign Legion general Juan Yagüe loathed O'Duffy. Most of the brigade returned to Cáceres and was shipped home from Portugal. On its arrival in late June 1937 in Dublin it was greeted by hundreds, not thousands as expected, and O'Duffy's political career was over. Showing their displeasure with the affair, the volunteers from County Kerry and from the north of Ireland marched off separately from the main contingent, disassociating themselves from O'Duffy.

By the time Irish pro-Franco volunteers returned to Ireland, there was no longer widespread support for Franco's cause. Fearghal McGarry writes, 'As it dragged on and atrocities such as the German bombing of Guernica, a village in the Catholic Basque region, became known the idea of Franco leading a religious crusade became more difficult to sustain. Also significant was the collapse of the opportunistic pro-Franco lobby. By the summer of 1937 the Irish Brigade had returned in failure and the Christian Front had acrimoniously collapsed under its own internal pressures. Even the Catholic church toned down its pro-Franco stance when it was revealed that the Christian Front had gained control of its national collection for Spain under rather dubious circumstances'.

The losses of the Brigade are not exactly clear. One bandera member cited 35 killed in Spain and 40 more wounded. While another count calculates that ten were killed in action and another 21 died of wounds or disease. Historian Fearghal McGarry writes that 'they left behind them fifteen dead compatriots [and] six hospitalized legionnaires

The Irish government destroyed its files relating to the Brigade in May 1940.

== See also ==
- Foreign involvement in the Spanish Civil War
- Irish involvement in the Spanish Civil War
- Irish Socialist Volunteers in the Spanish Civil War
- Connolly Column
- Ireland–Spain relations
