= Ireland–Spain relations =

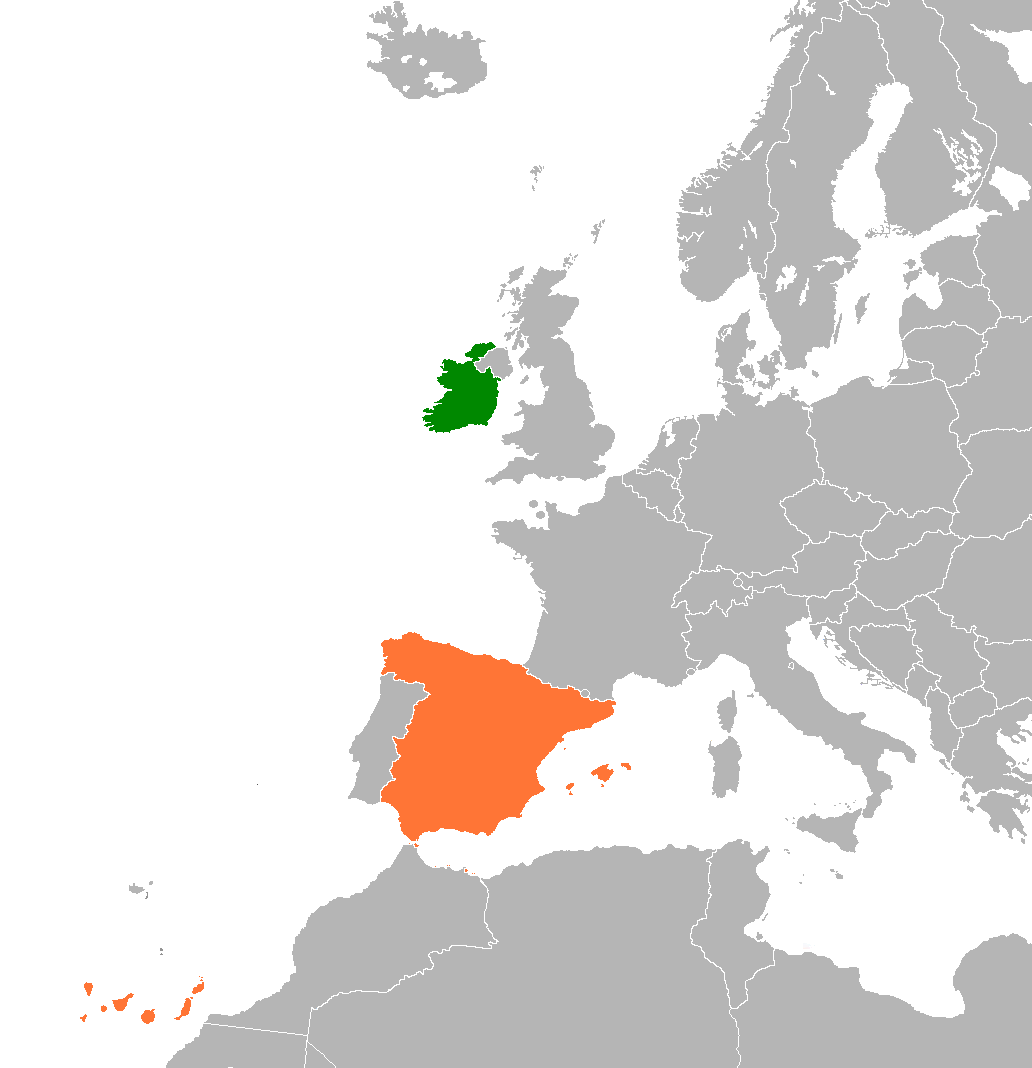

- Ireland: Spain

The Republic of Ireland and the Kingdom of Spain have maintained historical and current relations. Ireland has an embassy in Madrid and Spain has an embassy in Dublin. Both states are members of the Council of Europe, the European Union, the Eurozone and the Organisation for Economic Co-operation and Development.

== History ==
=== Early relations ===
The first awareness and contact between both nations was through stories about Celtic migration from Iberia to Ireland as mentioned in the Lebor Gabála Érenn regarding the Milesians. In the mythical genealogies of the Gaels of Ireland, they all trace their ancestry back in the male line to Míl Espáine ("Soldier of Hispania").

The first diplomatic contact between Irish and Spanish nobility happened in April 1529 when the Spanish ambassador, Don Gonzalez Fernandez, visited Ireland and met with the 10th Earl of Desmond. The agreement, known as the Treaty of Dingle, gave a formal legal and constitutional foundation to the rights of citizenship and other privileges that Irish exiles and émigrés enjoyed in Habsburg Spain, Habsburg Austria and Habsburg Netherlands from the 16th to the early 20th centuries. Both nations felt united in their common beliefs of Catholicism, but that was not an issue in 1529. In 1554-58 Philip Prince of Asturias was married to Mary I and was named as titular King of Ireland in the Papal Bull Ilius ad quem. As a result, during the first plantations of Ireland what is now County Offaly was shired as "King's County", and Philipstown (now Daingean) was named in his honour, the first Irish place to be named after someone from Spain. Soon after Mary's death, he succeeded as Philip II of Spain.

In 1601, Spain supported Irish rebels fighting against England during the Nine Years War. An armada was sent to Ireland, but was defeated at the Siege of Kinsale. At the time, the Catholics of Ireland saw Spain as a potential liberator of their country from Protestant England and in 1595 Hugh O'Neill offered the crown of Ireland to Philip II of Spain. Philip refused the offer, having already been the titular King of Ireland.

Many Irishmen in rebellion against English rule subsequently sought refuge in Spain following the Flight of the Earls (1607), and for the next two centuries Irish soldiers contributed to Spanish Army of Flanders and fought side by side during the Dutch Revolts and during the Thirty Years' War. During the Anglo-Spanish War (1625–1630), proposals were made in 1627 to launch an invasion of Ireland under Shane O'Neill and Hugh O'Donnell but did not go further than the planning stage.

Irish soldiers in the service of Spain also participated in the colonization of the Americas. Several prominent Spanish officials of Irish origin governed and administered Spanish colonies as Viceroy's, such as Juan O'Donojú in Mexico and Ambrosio O'Higgins in Peru, or became ministers in the Spanish government, most notably Leopoldo O'Donnell and his relatives Carlos O'Donnell and Juan O'Donnell. There were also Irish soldiers allied in the British Legions who fought for the independence of Gran Colombia against Spain.

=== Independence for the Republic of Ireland and the Spanish Civil War ===
Memorial to Limerick International Brigade

In January 1801, Ireland became a part of the newly created United Kingdom of Great Britain and Ireland, and all relations between Ireland and Spain were henceforth carried out through the Court of St James's. Napoleon's Irish Legion took part in suppressing the Dos de Mayo Uprising. After the Napoleonic Wars, the Hibernia Regiment was disbanded by the Spanish Army in 1818 after a British request.

In December 1922, most of Ireland gained a form of independence within the British Empire as the Irish Free State and, in 1924, diplomatic relations were officially established between the new Irish Free State and the Kingdom of Spain. That same year, Spain opened its first consulate in Dublin. In 1935, the first Irish Minister was appointed to Spain with residence in Madrid.

In 1936, Spain was engulfed in a Civil War between the Republican faction led by President Manuel Azaña; and the Nationalist faction led by General Francisco Franco. The Free State was a member of the Non-intervention Committee. However, Ireland (North and South) was divided in opinion over the war. Many Irish Catholics sided with Francisco Franco. A smaller number sided with the Spanish Republican faction. In 1936 the Irish Christian Front was established to financially support Francisco Franco and the Irish Brigade was created to fight for the Nationalist side and contributed 700 Irish volunteer soldiers to Franco. At the same time, 250 Irish socialist volunteers joined the International Brigades and fought for the Spanish Republican faction. Both Irish factions took part in the Battle of Jarama in February 1937. By the summer of 1937, the Irish Brigade was "disarmed and ordered out of Spain by Franco" (Fearghal McGarry); most of the socialists stayed until late 1938, although they were frequently treated as pariahs on their return home, and many emigrated to the UK. After the war ended in 1939, the Irish Minister presented his credentials in Burgos and formally recognized the new Spanish government under General Franco.

=== Post-war relations ===
In 1973, both Northern Ireland (as part of the United Kingdom) and the Republic of Ireland joined the European Economic Community (EEC), and Spain followed suit in 1986. In July 1986, King Juan Carlos I of Spain paid his first official visit to the Republic of Ireland. In 1993, Mary Robinson became the first Irish President to pay an official visit to Spain. Since then, there have been numerous visits between leaders of both states. Recently, in January 2017, Irish Taoiseach Enda Kenny paid a visit to Spain, and in 2024, in the context of the Gaza war, Prime Minister Pedro Sánchez visited Taoiseach Simon Harris in Dublin to discuss support for Palestinian statehood.

Spain has increasingly become an important tourist destination for Irish travelers. In 2016, 1.4 million Irish citizens visited Spain for tourism. At the same time, 263,000 Spanish tourists visited Ireland. In 2016, 35,000 Spanish nationals studied English in Ireland. Several Irish and Spanish airlines provide direct services between both nations.

== Bilateral agreements ==
Both Ireland and Spain have signed several bilateral agreements (mostly prior to both states joining the European Union), such as an Agreement on the Exchange of Diplomatic Pouches (1935); Agreement on the Exchange of Information regarding Meteorology (1950); Extradition Treaty (1957); Cultural Cooperation Agreement (1980); Spanish Agreement on Renouncing Historic Rights of Fishing in Irish Waters (1980) and an Agreement on the Avoidance of Double Taxation (1994).

== Trade ==
In 2015, trade between the Republic of Ireland and Spain totaled 4.5 billion Euros. The Republic of Ireland's exports to Spain include: pharmaceutical products, electrical equipment, perfume and chemical based products. Spain's exports to Ireland include: automobiles, clothing and organic chemical products. That same year, Irish investments in Spain totaled 200 million Euros while at the same time, Spanish investments in the Republic of Ireland totaled 4 billion Euros.

== Resident diplomatic missions ==
- Ireland has an embassy in Madrid.
- Spain has an embassy in Dublin.
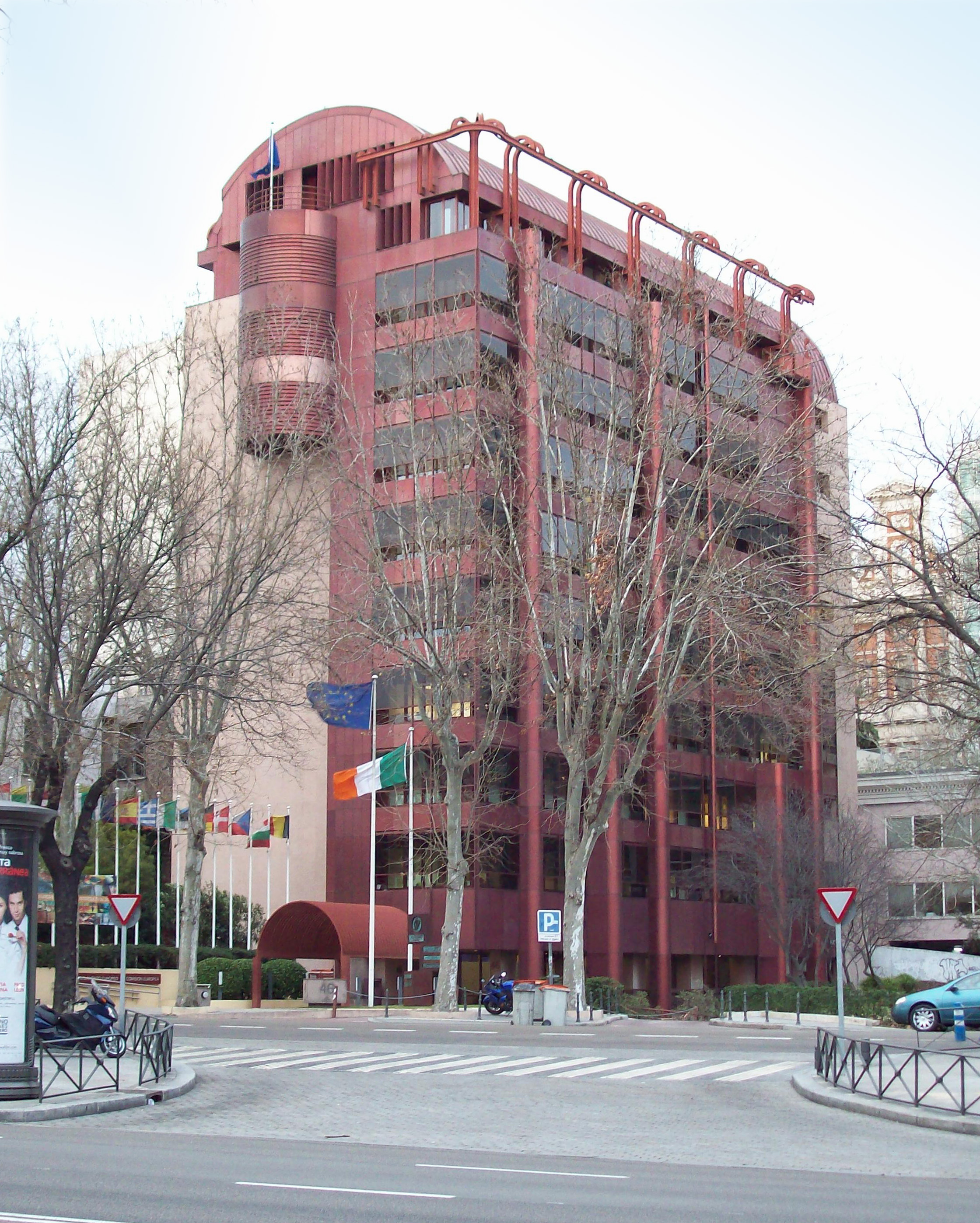
Embassy of Ireland in Madrid

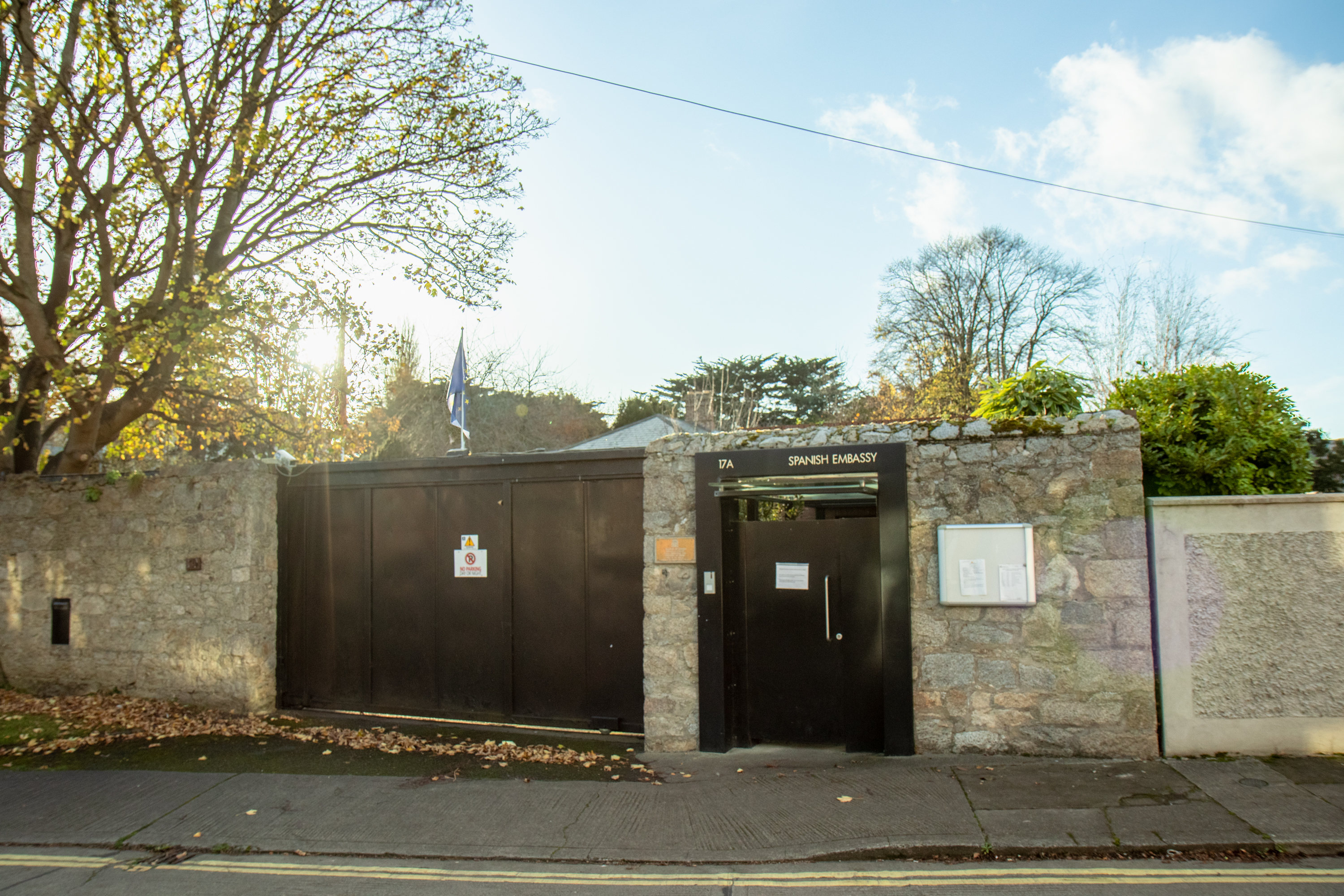
Embassy of Spain in Dublin

== See also ==
- Foreign relations of Ireland
- Foreign relations of Spain
- Ireland-NATO relations
- NATO-EU relations
- Celtiberians
- Connolly Column
- Irish Ambassador to Spain
- Irish Brigade (Spanish Civil War)
- Irish College
- Irish involvement in the Spanish Civil War
- Irish socialist volunteers in the Spanish Civil War
- Irish military diaspora
- Irish people in mainland Europe
- Regiment of Hibernia
- Spanish Armada in Ireland
