= Irish socialist volunteers in the Spanish Civil War =

Memorial to Limerick men who fought in the International Brigades, erected outside Limerick City Hall in 2014.

Irish socialist volunteers in the Spanish Civil War describes a grouping of IRA members and Irish Socialists who fought in support of the cause of the Second Republic during the Spanish Civil War. These volunteers were taken from both Irish Republican and Unionist political backgrounds but were bonded through a Socialist and anti-clerical political philosophy. Many of the Irish Socialist volunteers who went to Spain later became known as the Connolly Column.

== Background ==
Following the rejection of the socialist motion put to the IRA Army convention on 17 March 1934 at St. Stephen's Green, Dublin three leading IRA volunteers resigned their duties within the IRA; Frank Ryan, Staff Captain Peadar O'Donnell, and George Gilmore.

Then followed a meeting of the Republican Congress, a body composed of the disaffected members of the IRA who wanted Irish Republicanism to focus on achievement of its goals via the political ideals of Socialism. Held in Athlone on April 7 and 8 the focus of the initial meeting was to decide on the direction of the new body and it was decided that an annual Congress should be inaugurated beginning in September 1934. (Note: At the Bodenstown Commemoration of 1934 members of the Republican Congress from Shankill Road and Ballymacarrett (then members of the Socialist Party) had attempted to carry a banner which read "Wolfe Tone Commemoration 1934 - Shankill Road Belfast Branch" but caused scuffles due to the friction between nationalist and socialist outlooks.)

Following this an IRA court martial took place with former Major-General Seán Russell and the Commanding Officers (OC.) of North Tipperary, Clonmel, and the Fourth Dublin Battalion presiding. Former Commandant General Michael Price and O'Donnell were found guilty in absentia on a charge of insubordination and dismissed from the organisation. Bobby Edwards, Ryan, and Gilmore were also court martialed. IRA members who had expressed support for the Congress were effectively "stood down" from active service in the IRA although they would have retained links to the organisation due to its make up and operational nature.

=== Republican Congress ===
Planning for Republican Congress continued, however, with a meeting being held in Rathmines Town Hall on September 29 — 30, 1934. From the outset schisms within the newly formed group were apparent. Michael Price, Roddy Connolly and his sister Nora Connolly called for a drive towards a Workers Republic and the formation of a Workers Republican Party. O'Donnell, Ryan, Gilmore, and Edwards put forward a resolution supporting a United Front of the working class and small farmers. The latter resolution was eventually carried by 99 votes to 84. (Note: Other prominent members in the O'Donnell/Ryan/Gilmore faction included Seamus MacGowan, Sheila Humphreys, and Eithne Coyle, although Coyle and Humphreys resigned prior to the September Congress due to "[verbal] attacks on the IRA".)

The Congress gradually fell apart by 1936 and its significance as a political group passed. It did however provide the framework through which recruitment of IRA volunteers to fight in Spain would take place.

== Spain ==
With the outbreak of the Spanish Civil War, Peadar O'Donnell and then George Gilmore went to Spain on behalf of the Congress to report on proceedings, and returned enthusiastic supporters of the Spanish Republicans. Ryan was incensed at quasi-Fascist Eoin O'Duffy organising an Irish Brigade to fight with the Fascists, and in open letters to the papers criticised Cardinal MacRory for raising funds at church collections to support Franco. The Congress started publicising the Spanish Republican cause in public meetings. Frank Ryan organized the first transports of Irish volunteers. The first men left Dublin, Belfast, and Rosslare ports in early December 1936 traveling through France and Britain to Spain.

=== Campaigning ===
The first Socialist volunteers saw action on the Cordoba front in December 1936. Approximately 135 men fought beside the French IXth Battalion and No.1 Company of the British Battalion. The objective was the town of Lopera and by the time the action was complete it had caused the death of nine in the Irish contingent. They were Frank Conroy (Kildare), Johnny Meehan (Galway), Henry Boner, Jim Foley, Tony Fox, Leo Green, Michael Nolan, Michael May, Tommy Wood (Dublin).

Training for the Socialist volunteers took place at Madrigueras (Albacete) alongside troops from the British Battalion. The two groups were not amalgamated, and the Irish contingent was shortly moved to a base in the town of Villanueva de la Jara in January 1937 and part of the Irish voted to move over to the American Lincoln Battalion.

The next engagement the Irish were involved in was the Battle of Jarama following Franco's advance into the Jarama Valley in February 1937. Other campaigns the volunteers were involved included the 1938 advance on Gandesa and the decisive Battle of Ebro where they fought as part of the XV Brigade.

=== Demobilization ===
On demobilization of Republican forces the Irish contingent marched to Marsa, later Els Guiamets, and then the demobilization center in Ripoll.

== Motivations ==
Other factors outside of anti-fascist political conviction and the charismatic urging of Ryan and O'Donnell cited by volunteers for fighting in Spain include:

- a series of riots in Belfast in 1932 and 1935. The 1932 riots, labeled the "Outdoor Relief Riots" were seen by many working class Protestants as a reason to turn to the politics of Socialism. William Tumilson, a working class Protestant, volunteered to join the IRA in the Short Strand district and subsequently became involved in the politics of Republican Congress following the riots.
- Harry Midgley, leader of the Northern Ireland Labour Party, supported the Spanish Republic, but this alienated most of his Catholic supporters.
- sections of the Catholic Church's support of Generalísimo Francisco Franco also turned many to support the legitimate government.
- media reporting of the bombing of Guernica in April 1937 and a perceived bias in pro-Francoist media reporting in the Irish and British media. Along with radio reports given by Frank Ryan on "Radio Madrid".
- it was easier to form a "common front" against fascism abroad rather than against imperialism and unionism at home (Note: This was the view expressed by Jack MacGougan then secretary of the NI. Socialist Party (NISP).)
- events organized across Ireland, including the Ulster Hall in Belfast, in which Basque representatives encouraged participation
- a continuation of the struggle that the Irish had been engaged in; Tumlinson was to write home shortly before his death on 14 March 1937:

"Still determined to stay here until fascism is completely crushed. Impossible to do other than continue on with the slogan of Cathal Brugha: "No Surrender"

== Legacy ==
The heavy toll paid by the Republican side in terms of manpower and eventual defeat lead to the imprisonment of those who did not escape from Spain following the victory of the Francoists. While many Socialist and Republicans were able to escape on time, they returned to an Ireland which had undergone significant change in terms of restrictions placed on those sympathetic to the aims of the IRA.

Commemorations of the part Irish Republicans and Socialists played in the conflict are still held and a plaque honoring IRA volunteers from the Short Strand in Belfast is the site of annual ceremonies. The Connolly bookshop in Dublin keeps various items of memorabilia from the troops who fought.

== Notable Socialist Irish volunteers in Spain ==
=== Ulster ===
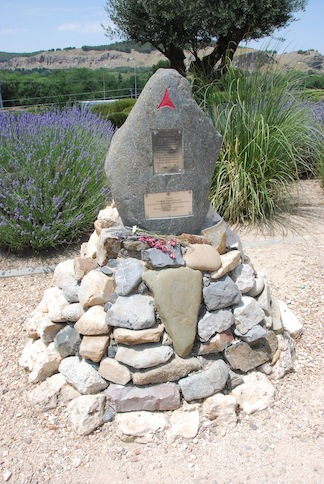
A monument dedicated to Charlie Donnelly of the Republican International Brigade who was killed while fighting in the Battle of Jarama

James Stranney's grave in Milltown Cemetery, Belfast. Stranney was killed in action in 1938.

- Arthur Archibald - Belfast
- Archie F Bailey - Belfast
- Victor Barr - Belfast
- William (Bill) Beattie - Shankill Road, Belfast. Killed in the Battle of Brunete on 25 July 1937.
- William Black - Belfast
- Edward G (Ted) Bourne - Belfast
- Joe Boyd - Ulsterville Avenue, Belfast. Paramedic in the Scottish Ambulance Unit.
- Danny Boyle - Belfast. Killed in the Battle of Jarama, 1937.
- Robert Boyle - Belfast
- James Campbell - Derry
- John Campbell - Belfast
- James W Clarke - Belfast
- John Coleman - Belfast
- James C Domegan - Belfast
- Alex Donegan - Belfast
- Charles (Charlie) Donnelly - Dungannon, County Tyrone. Killed in the Battle of Jarama on 27 July 1937
- John (Paddy) Donovan - Belfast
- Hugh (Pat) Dooley - Belfast
- William Falconer - Belfast
- John (Jack) Flynn - Derry
- Albert F (Willie) Fulton - Belfast
- George F Gorman - Derry. Killed in the Battle of the Ebro, 1938
- William John Haire - Lurgan, County Armagh
- Pat Hall - Belfast
- James Patrick Haughey - Lurgan, County Armagh
- John Hugh Heeney - Belfast
- Bill Henry - Old Lodge Road, Belfast. Killed in the Battle of Jarama, 1937.
- James Isaac Hillen - Belfast
- Hugh Stewart Hunter - Ballyclare, County Antrim/York Street, Belfast
- William Keenan - Bangor, County Down
- Joseph Kelly - Belfast
- Thomas A Kerr - Belfast
- Jim Lamour - Belfast
- William P (Bill) Laughran - Belfast. Killed at the Battle of Brunete, 1937.
- James Richard (Bill) Lord - Belfast
- Joseph E Lowry - Belfast
- James (or Joseph) Patrick Magill - Lurgan, County Armagh
- Samuel Martin - Belfast
- William Meeke - Bushmills, County Antrim
- Andrew Molyneaux - Belfast
- William A Morrison - Belfast
- John Murphy - Derry
- Patrick K (Paddy) Murphy - Belfast
- Thomas (Tom) Murphy - Monaghan/Belfast
- Basil Andrew (Ben) Murray - Aughnacloy, County Tyrone/Ballymacarrett, Belfast. Killed in the Battle of Aragon 1938
- Joe Murray, County Antrim
- Richard John McAleenan - Banbridge, County Down
- Paddy McAllister - Belfast (fought with Canadian Mackenzie-Papineau Battalion)
- Paddy Roe McLaughlin - Lecamey, Donegal
- Eamon McGrotty - Derry
- Fred McMahon - Belfast. Paramedic in the Scottish Ambulance Unit
- Paddy O'Daire - Glenties, County Donegal
- Willie O'Hanlon - Belfast
- Dick O'Neill - Falls Road, Belfast
- James Stranney - Short Strand, Belfast - KIA Advance on Gandesa, Hill 481, 1938
- William "Liam" Tumilson - Belfast - KIA Battle of Jarama Hill, 14 March 1937

=== Other regions of Ireland ===
- Robert Boyle - Dublin
- George Brown - Kilkenny/Manchester. Killed In Action July 1937.
- Paul Burns
- Paddy Cochrane - Dublin
- Frank Conroy - Kildare
- Kit Conway, Burncourt, Co. Tipperary - mortally wounded Battle of Jarama 12 February 1937
- Peter Daly - Monageer, County Wexford. Wounded in the Battle of Belchite (1937). Died on 5 September 1937.
- Alec Digges
- Eugene Downing - Dublin
- Bob Doyle - Dublin
- Frank Edwards - Waterford
- Rev. Robert M. Hilliard -Killarney, County Kerry. Wounded at the Battle of Jarama and died on 22 February 1937.
- Jackie Hunt - Waterford
- Mike Lehane
- Maurice Levitas - Dublin/London
- Alan MacLarnon - Dublin
- Jack Nalty - Ballygar, County Galway. Killed in the Battle of the Ebro on 23 September 1938.
- Thomas O'Brien - Dublin
- Peter O'Connor - Waterford.
- Eddie O'Flaherty
- Michael O'Riordan - Cork
- Thomas Patten, County Mayo, killed in the Battle of Madrid, December 1936
- Johnny Power
- Paddy Power
- Maurice 'Mossie' Quinlan, Waterford. KIA Jarama 17 February 1937
- Frank Ryan
- Thomas Wood, from North Dublin, died at the Battle of Lopera in 1936

== See also ==
- Foreign involvement in the Spanish Civil War
- Connolly Column
- Abraham Lincoln Brigade - encompassing Ryan's command in the George Washington Battalion
- Ireland and the Spanish Civil War
- Viva la Quinta Brigada
- Irish Brigade (Spanish Civil War) - Irish volunteers who fought for Franco under the leadership of Eoin O'Duffy.
- Ireland–Spain relations
