= International response to the Spanish Civil War =

The international response to the Spanish Civil War included many non-Spaniards participating in combat and advisory positions. The governments of Italy, Germany and, to a lesser extent, Portugal contributed money, munitions, manpower and support to the Nationalist forces, led by Francisco Franco. Some nations that declared neutrality favored the nationalists indirectly. The governments of the Soviet Union and, to a lesser extent, Mexico, aided the Republicans, also called Loyalists, of the Second Spanish Republic. The aid came even after all the European powers had signed a Non-Intervention Agreement in 1936. Although individual sympathy for the plight of the Spanish Republic was widespread in the liberal democracies, pacifism and the fear of a second world war prevented them from selling or giving arms. However, Nationalist pleas were answered within days by Adolf Hitler and Benito Mussolini. Tens of thousands of individual foreign volunteers travelled to Spain to fight, the majority for the Republican side.

== International non-intervention ==
Non-intervention had been proposed in a joint diplomatic initiative by the governments of France and the United Kingdom, which responded to antiwar sentiment. France was also worried that sympathisers of the Nationalists would cause a civil war in France. Non-intervention was part of a policy aimed at preventing a proxy war and the escalation of the war into a second world war.

On 3 August 1936, Charles de Chambrun presented the French government's non-intervention plan, and Galeazzo Ciano promised to study it. The British, however, immediately accepted the plan in principle. The next day, it was put to Germany by André François-Poncet. The German position was that such a declaration was not needed. A similar approach was made to the Soviet Union. On 6 August, Ciano confirmed Italian support in principle. The Soviet government similarly agreed in principle if Portugal was included and Germany and Italy stopped aid immediately. On 7 August, France unilaterally declared its non-intervention. Draft declarations had been put to German and Italian governments. Such a declaration had already been accepted by the United Kingdom, Belgium, the Netherlands, Poland, Czechoslovakia and the Soviet Union and required renouncing all traffic in war matériel, direct or indirect. Portuguese Foreign Minister Armindo Monteiro (Note: See also pt:Armindo Rodrigues de Sttau Monteiro (in Portuguese)) was also asked to accept but held his hand. On 9 August, French exports were suspended. Portugal accepted the pact on 13 August unless its border was threatened by the war.

On 15 August, the United Kingdom banned exports of war materiel to Spain. Italy agreed to the pact and signing on 21 August. That there was a surprising reversal of views has been put down to the growing belief that countries could not or indeed would not abide by the agreement anyway. On 24 August, Germany signed. The Soviet Union was keen not to be left out, and on 23 August, it agreed to the Non-Intervention Agreement, which was followed by a decree from Joseph Stalin banning exports of war matérial to Spain, thereby bringing the Soviets into line with the Western powers.

=== Non-Intervention Committee ===
Each movement of the Non-Intervention Committee has been made to serve the cause of the rebellion… This Committee was the most cynical and lamentably dishonest group that history has known.

— Claude Bowers, American ambassador to Spain

It was then that the Non-Intervention Committee was created to uphold the agreement, but the double dealing of both the Soviet Union and Germany had already become apparent. The ostensible purpose of the committee was to prevent personnel and matériel reaching the warring parties, as with the Non-Intervention Agreement. The committee first met in London on 9 September 1936. (Note: Involved were Albania, Austria, Belgium, Bulgaria, Czechoslovakia, Denmark, Estonia, Finland, France, Germany, Greece, Hungary, Ireland, Italy, Latvia, Lithuania, Luxembourg, Norway, Poland, Romania, Turkey, the Soviet Union, the United Kingdom and Yugoslavia. (Thomas 1961, p. 277)) It was chaired by the British W. S. Morrison. France was represented by Charles Corbin, Italy by Dino Grandi and the Soviet Union by Ivan Maisky. Germany was represented by Joachim von Ribbentrop, and Portugal, whose presence had been a Soviet requirement, was not represented. The second meeting took place on 14 September. It established a subcommittee to be attended by representatives of Belgium, Czechoslovakia, France, Germany, Italy, the Soviet Union, Sweden and the United Kingdom to deal with the day-to-day running of non-intervention. Among them, however, the United Kingdom, France, Germany and Italy dominated, perhaps worryingly so, Soviet non-military aid was revived but not military aid.

Meanwhile, the 1936 meeting of the League of Nations began. There, Anthony Eden convinced Monteiro to have Portugal join the Non-Intervention Committee. Álvarez del Vayo spoke out against the Non-Intervention Agreement and claimed that it put the rebel Nationalists on the same footing as the Republican government. The Earl of Plymouth replaced Morrison as the British representative. The Conservative member often adjourned meetings to the benefit of the Italians and Germans, and the committee was accused of having an anti-Soviet bias.

On 12 November, plans to post observers to Spanish frontiers and ports to prevent breaches of the agreement were ratified. France and the United Kingdom became divided on whether to recognise Franco's forces as a belligerent, as the British wanted, or to fail to do, as the French wanted. That was subsumed by the news that the Italian and German governments had recognised the Nationalists as the true government of Spain. The League of Nations condemned intervention, urged its council's members to support non-intervention and commended mediation. It then closed discussion on Spain and left it to the committee. A mediation plan, however, was soon dropped.

The Soviets met the request to ban volunteers on 27 December, followed by Portugal on 5 January and Germany and Italy on 7 January. On 20 January, Italy put a moratorium on volunteers since it believed that supplies to the Nationalists were now sufficient. Non-intervention would have left both sides with the possibility of defeat, which Germany, Italy and the Soviet Union in particular were keen to avoid.

=== Control plan ===
Observers were posted to Spanish ports and borders, and both Ribbentrop and Grandi were told to agree to the plan, significant shipments already having taken place. Portugal would not accept observers but agreed to personnel attached to the British embassy in Lisbon. Zones of patrol were assigned to each of the four nations, and an International Board was set up to administer the scheme. There were assurances by Italy that it would not end non-intervention.

In May, the committee noted two attacks on the patrol's ships by Republican aircraft. It iterated calls for the withdrawal of volunteers from Spain, condemned the bombing of open towns and showed approval of humanitarian work. Germany and Italy stated that they would withdraw from the committee and from the patrols without guarantees of no further attacks. Early June saw the return of Germany and Italy to the committee and the patrols. Attacks on the German cruiser Leipzig on 15 and 18 June made Germany and Italy once again withdraw from patrols but not from the committee. That prompted the Portuguese government to remove British observers on the Spanish-Portuguese border. The United Kingdom and France offered to replace Germany and Italy, which, however, believed that they would be too partial. Germany and Italy requested for land controls to be kept and for belligerent rights to be given to the Nationalists to allow rights of search to be used by both the Republicans and the Nationalists to replace naval patrols. A British plan suggested naval patrols to be replaced by observers in ports and ships, with land control measures being resumed. Belligerent rights would not be granted until substantial progress was made on the volunteer withdrawal.

That culminated in a period during 1937 during which all of the powers were prepared to give up on non-intervention. By the end of July, the committee was in deadlock, and the aims of a successful outcome to the Spanish Civil War was looking unlikely for the Republic. Unrestricted Italian submarine warfare began on 12 August. The British Admiralty believed that a significant control effort was the best solution to attacks on British shipping. The committee decided that naval patrols did not justify the expense and would be replaced with observers at ports.

The Conference of Nyon was arranged by the British for all parties with a Mediterranean coastline, despite appeals by Italy and Germany for the committee to handle piracy and the other issues that the conference was to discuss. It decided for French and British fleets to patrol the areas of sea west of Malta and to attack any suspicious submarines. Also, warships that attacked neutral shipping would be attacked. Eden claimed that non-intervention had stopped a European war. The League of Nations reported on the Spanish situation by noting the "failure of non-intervention". On 6 November, the plan to recognise the Nationalists as belligerents, once significant progress had been made, was finally accepted. The Nationalists accepted on 20 November and the Republicans on 1 December. On 27 June, Maisky agreed to send two commissions to Spain to enumerate foreign volunteer forces and to bring about their withdrawal. The Nationalists, wishing to prevent the fall of the sympathetic British government, led by Neville Chamberlain, were seen to accept the plan.

== National non-intervention ==
=== United Kingdom and France ===
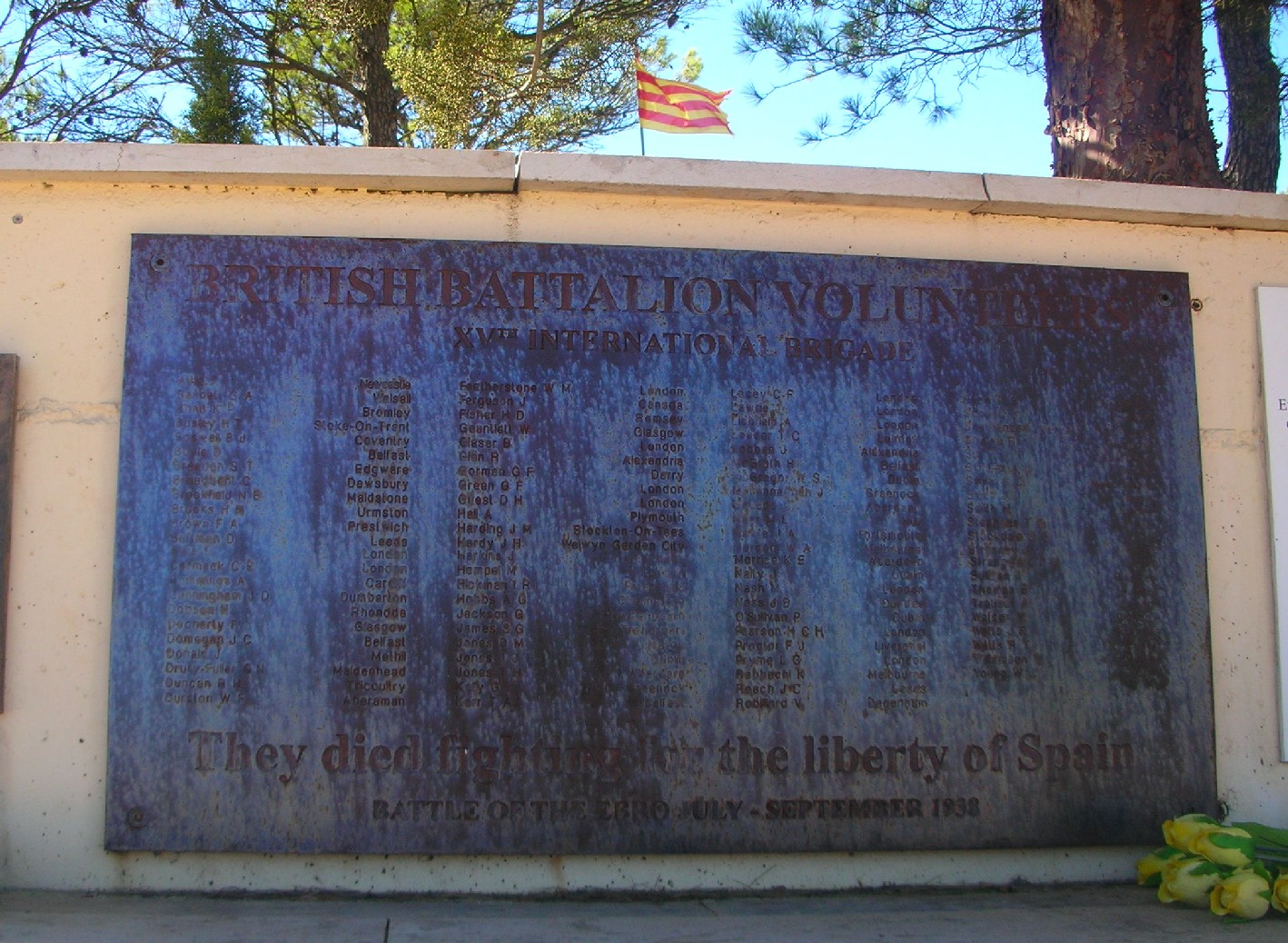
Plaque honouring the British soldiers of the International Brigades who died while they defended the Spanish Republic at the monument on Hill 705, Serra de Pàndols.

The United Kingdom officially proclaimed its neutrality in the conflict in 1936, and British foreign policy in Europe attempted to prevent the outbreak of a wider war through appeasing Germany and Italy. The Third National Government and Fourth National Government both believed that the Republicans were the puppets of far-left socialist and communist factions in Spain and accordingly adopted a policy of benevolent neutrality towards the Nationalists, which included covertly refusing to provide both direct and indirect help towards the Republic. Britain's ambassador to Spain, Sir Henry Chilton, was a strong admirer of the Nationalists and made several efforts to support their cause. Foreign Secretary Anthony Eden, while publicly maintaining the official policy of non-intervention, privately expressed his preference for a Nationalist victory. Eden also stated that his government "preferred a Rebel victory to a Republican victory".

The British government had long viewed the Republic as politically unstable and worried about Manuel Azaña's ability to prevent a takeover by far-left political factions. The Labour Party was strongly for the Republicans, but was heavily outnumbered by Conservative Party in the Parliament of the United Kingdom. (Note: Alpert (1998) p.65 notes that rank-and-file members of the Labour Party may have been opposed to helping the Republic.) The Labour Party eventually rejected non-intervention in October 1937. The Trades Union Congress was split since it had a strong anticommunist faction. British public opinion was divided on the conflict, with a clear majority demanding another major war be avoided. A large segment of the British public was strongly anticommunist, and so tended to prefer a Nationalist victory. Such pro-Nationalist sentiments were reinforced by right-wing media outlets such as the Daily Mail, which published atrocity propaganda about the Red Terror. However, such accounts exaggerated the scale of Republican atrocities and offended their readership, which was still sensitive to such accounts due to Rape of Belgium during World War I.

However, popular front elements on the British left strongly favoured the Republican cause. The British government actively discouraged its citizens from supporting either side of the conflict. Both the British and the French governments were committed to avoiding a second world war. France was reliant on British support in general. French Prime Minister Léon Blum, the socialist leader of the Popular Front, feared that support for the Republic would lead to a civil war and then to a fascist takeover of France. The left in France wanted direct aid to the Republicans. In Britain, part of the reasoning was based on an exaggerated belief of both German and Italian preparedness for war. The arms embargo meant that the Republicans' chief foreign source of matériel was the Soviet Union, and the Nationalists received weapons from Italy mainly and Germany. The last Spanish Republican prime minister, Juan Negrín, hoped that a general outbreak of war in Europe would help his cause by compelling Britain and France to help the Republic at last.

Ultimately, however, neither Britain nor France intervened to any significant extent. The British supplied food and medicine to the Republic but actively discouraged Blum and his French government from supplying weapons. Claude Bowers, the US ambassador to Spain, was one of the few ambassadors who was friendly to the Republic. He later condemned the Non-Intervention Committee by saying that each of its moves had been made to serve the cause of the rebellion: "This committee was the most cynical and lamentably dishonest group that history has known". Winston Churchill, who initially was an enthusiastic supporter of non-intervention, later described the workings of the committee as "an elaborate system of official humbug".

After the withdrawal of Germany and Italy from patrols, the French considered abandoning border controls or perhaps leaving non-intervention. However, the French were reliant on the British, who wished to continue with the patrols. Britain and France thus continued to labour over non-intervention and judged it effective although some 42 ships were estimated to have escaped inspection between April and the end of July. In trying to protect non-intervention in the Anglo-Italian meetings, which he grudgingly did, Eden would end up resigning from his post in the British Foreign Office. On 17 March 1938, Blum reopened the French border to arms traffic, and Soviet arms flowed in to the Republicans in Barcelona. Britain and France officially recognized the Nationalist government on 27 February 1939. The leader of the Labour Party, Clement Attlee, criticised the way it had been agreed by calling it "a gross betrayal ... two and a half years of hypocritical pretense of non-intervention".

=== United States ===
The flag of an unidentified unit of the Abraham Lincoln Brigade.

When the Spanish Civil War erupted, US Secretary of State Cordell Hull followed American neutrality laws and moved quickly to ban arms sales to both sides. On 5 August 1936, the United States had made it known that it would follow a policy of non-intervention but failed to announce it officially. Five days later, the Glenn L. Martin Company enquired whether the government would allow the sale of eight bombers to the Republicans; the response was negative. The United States also confirmed that it would not take part in several mediation attempts, including by the Organization of American States. US President Franklin Roosevelt initially ruled out US interference publicly with these words: "[there should be] no expectation that the United States would ever again send troops or warships or floods of munitions and money to Europe". However, he privately supported the Republicans and was concerned that a Nationalist victory would lead to more German influence in Latin America.

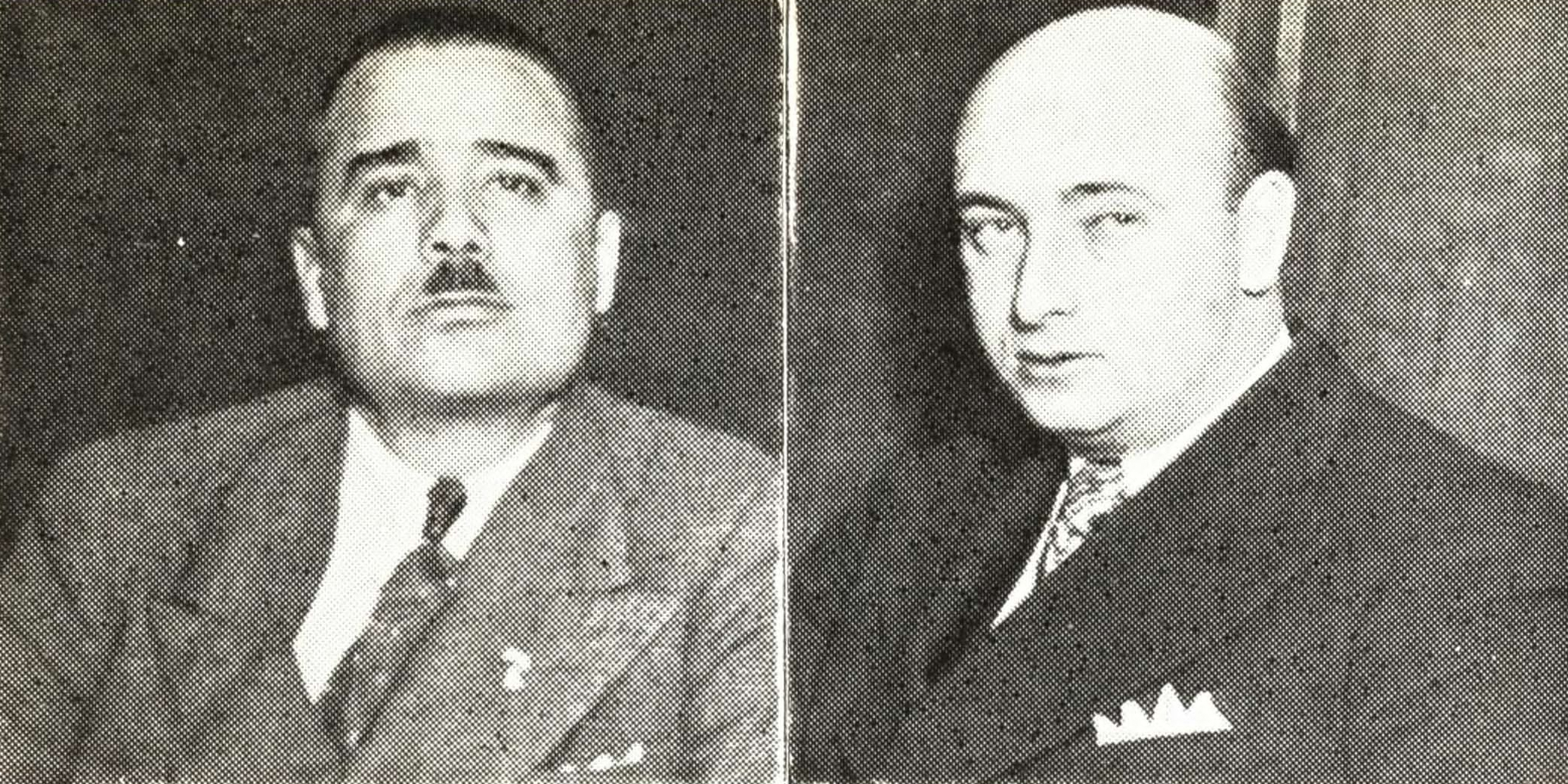
Representatives John T. Bernard (left) and Jerry J. O'Connell (right) were the only two members of the United States Congress to visit Republican Spain.

On 6 January 1937, the first opportunity after the winter break, both houses of the US Congress passed a resolution banning the export of arms to Spain. (Note: It passed by 81–0 in the US Senate and 406–1 in the US House of Representatives. (Thomas 1961, p. 338)) Those against the bill, including American socialists, communists, and even many liberals, suggested that the export of arms to Germany and Italy should be halted as well under the Neutrality Act of 1935 since foreign intervention was a state of war in Spain. Hull continued to doubt the extent of German and Italian operations, despite evidence to the contrary. In 1938, as the tide had turned against the Loyalists, Roosevelt attempted to bypass the embargo and ship American aircraft to the Republic via France.

The embargo did not apply to nonmilitary supplies, such as oil, gas, or trucks. The US government could thus ship food to Spain as a humanitarian cause, which benefited mostly the Loyalists. The Republicans spent almost $1 million a month on tires, cars, and machine tools from American companies between 1937 and 1938.

Some American businesses supported Franco. The automakers Ford, Studebaker, and General Motors sold a total of 12,000 trucks to the Nationalists. The American-owned Vacuum Oil Company in Tangier refused to sell to Republican ships at the outbreak of the war. The Texas Oil Company rerouted oil tankers headed for the Republic to the Nationalist-controlled port of Tenerife and illegally supplied gasoline on credit to Franco. Despite being fined $20,000, the company continued its credit arrangement until the war ended. After the war had ended, José María Doussinague, an undersecretary at the Spanish Foreign Ministry, stated that "without American petroleum and American trucks, and American credit, we could never have won the Civil War".

After the war, several American politicians and statesmen identified the US policy of isolation as disastrous. That narrative changed during the Cold War, when Franco was viewed as an ally against the Soviet Union.

== Support for Nationalists ==
=== Italy ===
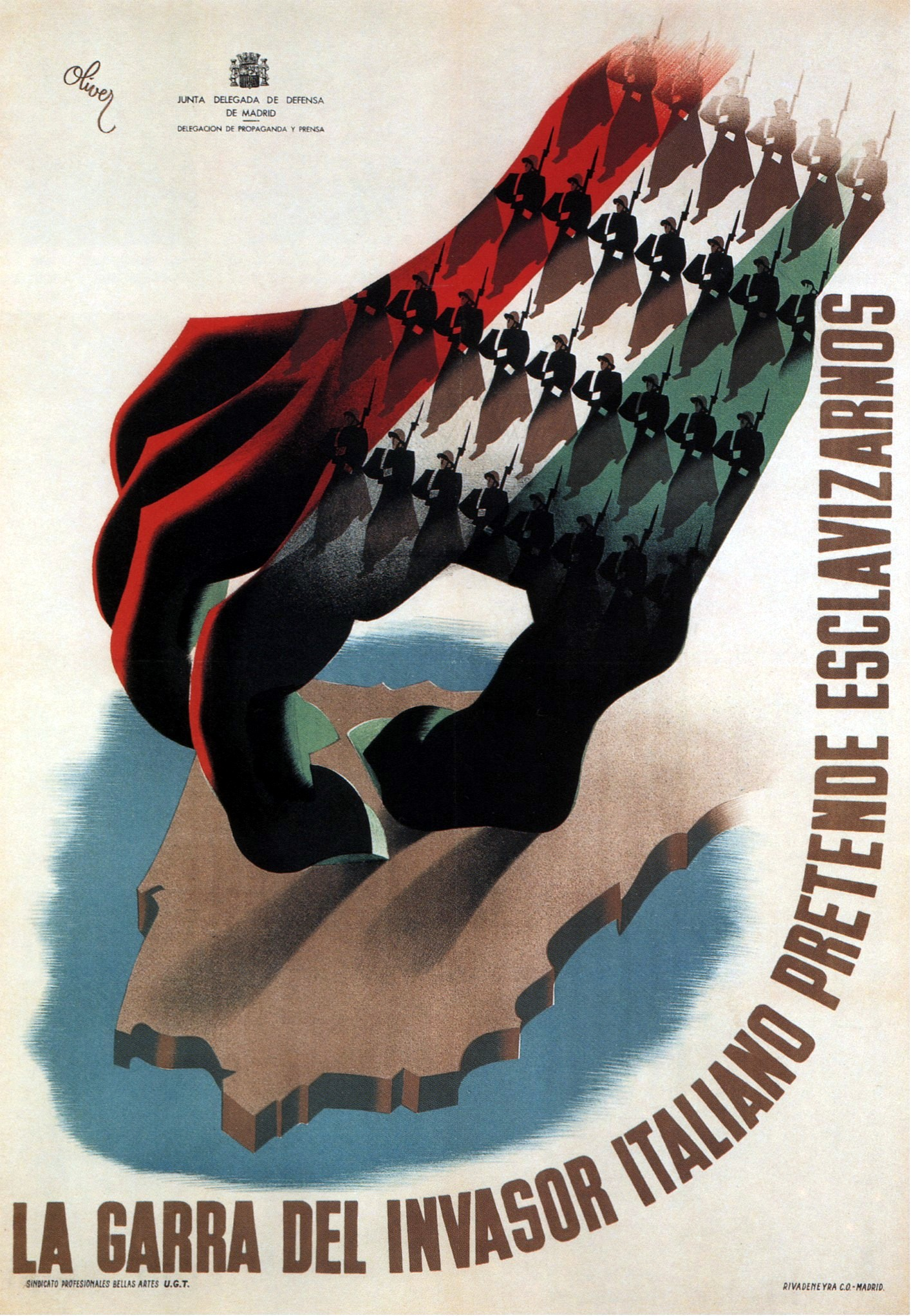
Republican propaganda poster stating, "The claw of the Italian invader intends to enslave us".

The Italians provided the "Corps of Volunteer Troops" (Corpo Truppe Volontarie). The use of the troops supported political goals of the German and Italian fascist leaderships, tested new tactics and provided combat experience so that troops would be prepared for any future war.

The involvement in the war helped to increase Mussolini's popularity. The Italian military aid to Nationalists against the anticlerical and anti-Catholic atrocities committed by the Republicans was exploited by Italian propaganda targeting Catholics. On July 27, 1936, the first squadron of Italian airplanes, sent by Mussolini, arrived in Spain. The maximum number of Italians in Spain fighting for the Nationalists, was 50,000 in 1937.

The government of Italy participated in the conflict by a body of volunteers from the ranks of the Italian Royal Army (Regio Esercito), Royal Air Force (Regia Aeronautica) and the Royal Navy (Regia Marina), which were formed into an expeditionary force, the Corps of Volunteer Troops (Corpo Truppe Volontarie, CTV). Italians also served in the Spanish-Italian Flechas Brigades and Divisions. The airborne component of Aeronautica pilots and ground crew were known as "Aviation Legion" (Aviazione Legionaria) and the contingent of submariners as Submarine Legion (Sottomarini Legionari). About 6,000 Italians are estimated to have died in the conflict. The New York Times correspondent in Seville, Frank L. Kluckhohn, reported on 18 August that "the presence of the Italian destroyer Antonio da Noli here means that an ally has come to help the insurgents".

Mussolini sent massive material aid to Italian forces in Spain that included:

- one cruiser, four destroyers and two submarines;
- 763 aircraft, including 64 Savoia-Marchetti SM.81 bombers, at least 90 Savoia-Marchetti SM.79 bombers, 13 Br.20 bombers, 16 Ca.310 bombers, 44 assault planes, at least 20 seaplanes, more than 300 Fiat CR.32 fighters, 70 Romeo 37 fighters, 28 Romeo 41 fighters and 10 other fighter planes and 68 reconnaissance planes;
- 1,801 artillery pieces, 1,426 heavy and medium mortars, 6,791 trucks and 157 tanks;
- 320,000,000 small arms cartridges, 7,514,537 artillery rounds, 1,414 aircraft motors, 1,672 tons of aircraft bombs and 240,747 rifles.

Also, 91 Italian warships and submarines participated during and after the war, sank about 72,800 tons of shipping and lost 38 sailors killed in action. Italy presented a bill for £80,000,000 ($400,000,000) in 1939 prices to the Francoists.

Italian pilots flew 135,265 hours during the war, partook in 5,318 air raids, hit 224 Republican and other ships, engaged in 266 aerial combats reported to have shot down 903 Republican and allied planes and lost around 180 pilots and aircrew killed in action.

Italian-Americans such as Vincent Patriarca, along with others in the Italian diaspora, also served in the Aviation Legion during the Italian military intervention.

=== Germany ===
Despite the German signing of a non-intervention agreement in September 1936, various forms of aid and military support were given by Nazi Germany in support of the Nationalists, including the formation of the Condor Legion as a land and air force, with German efforts to fly the Army of Africa to Mainland Spain proving successful in the early stages of the war. Operations gradually expanded to include strike targets, and there was a German contribution to many of the war's battles. The bombing of Guernica, on 26 April 1937, would be the most controversial event of German involvement, with perhaps 200 to 300 civilians killed. German involvement also included Operation Ursula, a U-boat undertaking and contributions from the Kriegsmarine.

The Condor Legion spearheaded many Nationalist victories, particularly in the air dominance from 1937 onward; 300 victories were claimed, as opposed to some 900 claimed by Italian forces. Spain provided a proving ground for German tank tactics as well as aircraft tactics, the latter being only moderately successful. Ultimately, the air superiority, which allowed certain parts of the Legion to excel, would not be replicated because of the unsuccessful 1940 Battle of Britain. The training provided to Nationalist forces by the Germans would prove at least as valuable as direct actions. Perhaps 56,000 Nationalist soldiers were trained by various German detachments in Spain, which were technically proficient and covered infantry, tanks and anti-tank units; air and anti-aircraft forces; and those trained in naval warfare.

It has been estimated that there were around 16,000 German citizens who fought in the conflict, mostly as pilots, ground crew, artillery and tank crew and military advisers and instructors. About 10,000 Germans were in Spain at the peak, with perhaps as many as 300 of whom being killed in action. German aid to the Nationalists amounted to approximately £43,000,000 ($215,000,000) in 1939 prices. (Note: Westwell (2004) gives a figure of 500 million Reichsmarks.) That was broken down in expenditure to 15.5% for salaries and expenses, 21.9% for direct delivery of supplies to Spain and 62.6% for the Condor Legion. No detailed list of German supplies furnished to Spain has been found.

=== Portugal ===
Emblem of the Portuguese volunteers "Viriatos".

Upon the outbreak of the civil war, Portuguese Prime Minister António de Oliveira Salazar was officially neutral but favoured the Nationalists. Salazar's Estado Novo held tense relations with the Republic since it held Portuguese dissidents to his regime. Portugal played a critical role in supplying the Nationalists with ammunition and logistical resources.

Direct military involvement involved "semi-official" endorsement by Salazar of a volunteer force of 8,000 to 12,000; the "Viriatos" (named after the Viriatos Legion) fought for Franco although never as a national unit. For the whole war, Portugal was instrumental in providing the Nationalists with a vital logistical organisation and by reassuring Franco and his allies that no interference would hinder the supply traffic directed to the Nationalists that crossed the borders of the Iberian countries. The Nationalists even referred to Lisbon as "the port of Castile". In 1938, with Franco's victory increasingly certain, Portugal recognised Franco's regime and soon after the war signed a treaty of friendship and non-aggression pact, the Iberian Pact. Portugal played an important diplomatic role in supporting Franco, including by insisting to the British government that Franco sought to replicate Salazar's Estado Novo, not Mussolini's Fascist Italy or Hitler's Nazi Germany.

=== Vatican ===
Vatican City

Among many influential Catholics in Spain, mainly conservative traditionalists and monarchists, the religious persecution was squarely blamed on the Republic. The ensuing outrage was used after the 1936 coup by the propaganda of the rebel faction and readily extended itself. The Catholic Church took the side of the rebels and defined the religious Spaniards who had been persecuted in Republican areas as "martyrs of the faith". It selectively ignored the many believing Catholic Spaniards who remained loyal to the Republic and even those who were later killed during the persecution and the massacres of Republicans. The devout Catholics who supported the Republic included high-ranking officers of the Spanish Republican Army such as the Republican General Vicente Rojo Lluch and the Catholic Basque nationalists, who opposed the rebels.

Initially, the Vatican refrained from declaring too openly its support of the rebel side in the war, but it had long allowed high ecclesiastical figures in Spain to do so and to define the conflict as a "Crusade". Throughout the war, however, Francoist propaganda and influential Spanish Catholics labelled the secular Republic as "the enemy of God and the Church" and denounced it by holding it responsible for anticlerical activities, such as shutting down Catholic schools, killing of priests and nuns by exalted mobs and desecrating religious buildings.

Forsaken by the Western European powers, the Republicans depended mainly on Soviet military assistance, which played into the hands of the Nationalists, who portrayed the Republic as a "Marxist" and godless state in Francoist propaganda. Its only other official support was from the anti-Catholic and nominally-revolutionary Mexico. By means of its extensive diplomatic network, the Holy See used its influence to lobby for the rebels. During an International Art Exhibition in Paris in 1937 in which both the Nationalist and the Republican governments were present, the Holy See allowed the Nationalist pavilion to display its exhibition under the Vatican flag although the Nationalist flag was still not officially recognised. By 1938, Vatican City had already officially recognised the Nationalists, one of the first countries to do so.

Regarding the position of the Holy See during and after the war, Manuel Montero, a lecturer at the University of the Basque Country, commented on 6 May 2007:

The Church, which upheld the idea of a 'National Crusade' in order to legitimize the military rebellion, was a belligerent part during the Civil War, even at the cost of alienating part of its members. It continues in a belligerent role in its unusual answer to the Historical Memory Law by recurring to the beatification of 498 "martyrs" of the Civil War. The priests executed by Franco's Army are not counted among them... In this political use of granting religious recognition one can perceive its indignation regarding the compensations to the victims of Francoism. Its selective criteria regarding the religious persons that were part of its ranks are difficult to fathom. The priests who were victims of the republicans are "martyrs who died forgiving", but those priests who were executed by the Francoists are forgotten.

=== Nationalist foreign volunteers ===
- Volunteer troops from other countries fought with the Nationalists but are not as well known as the Republican volunteers because only a few fought as national units. Among the latter was the 500-strong French Jeanne d'Arc battalion of the Spanish Foreign Legion, which was formed mostly from members of the far-right Croix de Feu but also included volunteers from Belgium and Switzerland.
- Another 11,100 volunteers from countries as diverse as Spanish Guinea, the Philippines, the United States, Brazil, Canada, Colombia, Uruguay, Haiti, Mexico, Venezuela, Puerto Rico, Peru, Paraguay, Dominican Republic, Nicaragua, El Salvador, Honduras, Ghana, Bolivia, Ecuador, Panama, Chile, Guatemala, French Guiana, Hungary, Romania, Greece, Costa Rica, Suriname, Turkey, The Netherlands, New Zealand and Australia fought for the Nationalists. In 1937, Franco turned down separate offers of national legions from Belgium and Greece, which had been made by foreign sympathisers. Exiled White Russians, including veterans already fighting for Franco, made multiple attempts at creating a separate Russian unit; however, all these motions were reviewed and ultimately rejected.

Ion Moța, the Romanian deputy leader of the Legion of the Archangel Michael (or the Iron Guard), led a group of seven legionaries who visited Spain in December 1936 to ally their movement to the Nationalists by presenting a ceremonial sword to survivors of the Siege of Alcazar. In Spain, the legionaries decided, against the orders that had been given to them in Bucharest, to join the Spanish Foreign Legion. Within days of joining, Moța and Vasile Marin, another prominent legionary, were killed on the Madrid Front at Majadahonda. After the extravagant and widely publicised funerals of Ion Moța and Vasile Marin, they became a prominent part of the Legion's mythology.

Several hundred Finns volunteered for the war. The volunteers had usually been involved in fascist activism in Finland: Y. P. I. Kaila had been involved in the Mäntsälä rebellion and joined the Spanish Foreign Legion, as did Kalevi Heikkinen who had been part of the fascist Lapua Movement with Edvard Karvonen. Karvonen opted to join the Condor Legion in Germany. Some Nationalist volunteers later joined the Finnish SS Battalion like Kaila and Olavi Karpalo. Carl von Haartman who was a famous film director also volunteered for the Nationalists.

In Greece, the dictatorship of Ioannis Metaxas prohibited any Greek involvement in foreign wars. Nevertheless, three Greeks are known to have enlisted in Francoist military forces, joining the Spanish Foreign Legion. Additionally, two Greeks born in Spain (one the son of a former Greek consul in Mallorca) were also recruited by Francoist agents for espionage.

The Norwegian writer Per Imerslund fought with the Falange militia in the war in 1937.

Outside of Ireland (see below), fighting for the Nationalist cause seems not to have held much appeal in the English-speaking world, according to historian Hugh Thomas. British journalist Peter Kemp was among the few who did, serving as an officer with a Carlist battalion for the Nationalists and was wounded. Thomas Krock, son of the famed American journalist Arthur Krock, was among the few Americans who fought for the Nationalists.

A landlord from Söke, Turkey named Fahri Tanman volunteered for the nationalist forces.

==== International ====
Anticlericalism and the murder of 4,000 clergy and many more nuns by the Republicans made many Catholic writers and intellectuals cast their lot with Franco, including Evelyn Waugh, Carl Schmitt, Hilaire Belloc, Roy Campbell, Giovanni Papini, Paul Claudel, J. R. R. Tolkien and those associated with the Action Française. Others, such as Jacques Maritain, François Mauriac and Georges Bernanos, initially supported Franco but later grew disenchanted with both sides.

Many artists with right-wing sympathies, such as Ezra Pound, Gertrude Stein, Wyndham Lewis, Robert Brasillach and Pierre Drieu La Rochelle voiced support for the Nationalists. Brasillach collaborated with Maurice Bardèche on his own Histoire de la Guerre d'Espagne, and the protagonist in Drieu La Rochelle's novel Gille travels to Spain to fight for the Falange. Lewis's The Revenge for Love (begun 1934) details the anarchist-communist conflict in the years preceding the war; though it is not a Spanish Civil War novel, it is often mistaken for one.

Even though the Mexican government supported the Republicans, most of the Mexican population, such as the peasant Cristeros, preferred Franco and the Nationalists. Mexico had suffered from the 1926–1929 Cristero War in which President Plutarco Elías Calles tried to enforce militant state atheism; it led to the deaths of many people as well as the suppression of popular religious Mexican celebrations.

==== Irish volunteers ====
The St. Patrick's saltire flag of the National Corporate Party, an Irish fascist movement that dispatched the Irish Brigade to support the Nationalists and fight against the Republicans.

Around 700 of Eoin O'Duffy's followers went to Spain to fight on Franco's side. O'Duffy's Irish Brigade, whose legionnaires considered their primary role in Spain to be fighting against communism and defending Catholicism, quickly became disenchanted with the Nationalist cause, in part due to the brutality of its tactics. As a result, Franco never dispatched a transport ship for 600 additional volunteers whom O'Duffy had recruited. In February 1937, Éamon de Valera's government passed a law prohibiting volunteers from leaving for Spain to fight for either side.

==== Russian volunteers ====
There were several Tsarist Russian soldiers from the old White Movement (who settled in Spain and France after the White Emigration) who joined the traditionalist monarchical cause of Carlism (a political doctrine to which they were very similar), as well as to continue the international Counterrevolution in a crusade against Bolshevik communism. The vast majority belonged to the Russian All-Military Union (a military organization of veterans of the Imperial Russian Army for mutual support in exile), although there were also recruits from other organizations or from individual initiative. Many had to cross the border from France to Spain, to end up joining the military units of the Carlist Requetés, without greater autonomy. This was due to the fact that there were financial problems in sending their own Russian detachments, of 1000 soldiers, under the flag of the Kornilov Regiment, as well as another offer to integrate 800 experienced officers into Franco's army (since there was no money to pay for Russian trips to Spain). So they ended up being mostly part of the Tercio Doña María de Molina. There were also other nationalities (such as Georgians) among these volunteers that included all the peoples of the former Russian Empire. In turn, the general and writer, Nikolai Shinkarenko, proposed to Franco to develop a Russian Volunteer Unit (which would have encouraged the recruitment of more White Russians), but Franco rejected the proposal because there were few Russians in combat, (approximately just over 100 White Russians). Russian anti-communists also fought in the Spanish Foreign Legion and other units of the National Army. At the end of hostilities, Russian volunteers were discharged with titles and awards, as well as receiving Spanish nationality.

==== Other nationals ====
- Over 1,000 volunteers from other nations served in the Nationalist forces, including Filipino Mestizos, Britons, Finns, Norwegians, Swedes, White Russians, Welsh People, Belgians, and Turks.
- Chileans and Argentinians also fought in the Nationalist ranks. They were religious Catholics and felt that they were fighting a crusade or a reconquista against atheists, communists and anarchists.
- Approximately 75,000 Moroccan Arabs Regulares fought in the Nationalist ranks. Spanish Morocco was a protectorate and so the Moroccans were not Spanish citizens. They were feared by the enemy and the local civilian population because they spared no one and "killed everyone", according to an interview with a Moroccan veteran. According to Professor Balfour, "The Moroccan troops involved felt they were fighting a jihad against atheists and communists. Another motivation was money and gaining a foothold in the (Iberian) peninsula".
- Despite its name, the Spanish Foreign Legion, which fought for the Nationalists, was made up mostly of Spanish citizens.

== Support for Republicans ==
=== Soviet Union ===
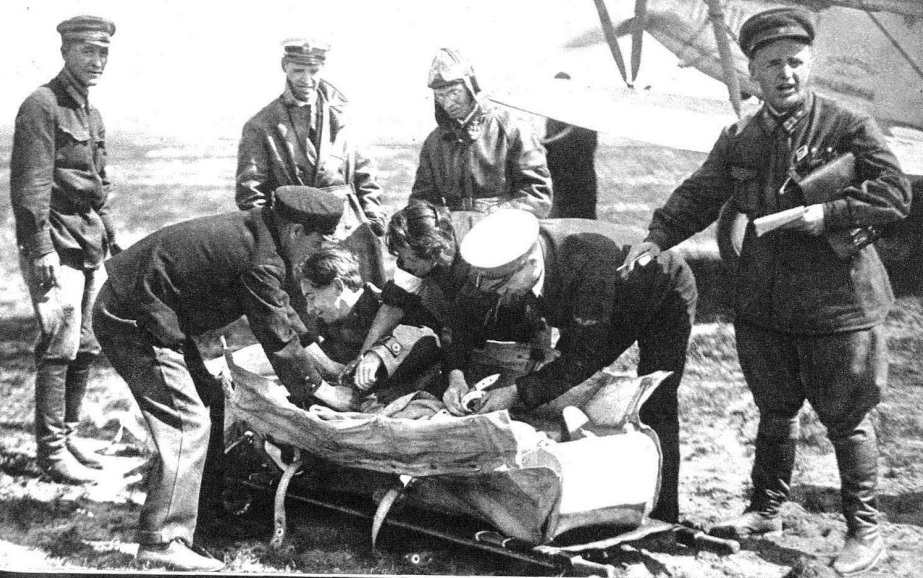
Soviet officer in Spain, September 1936

During the Spanish Civil War, the Soviet Union provided military equipment and support to the Republicans, being the only nation to provide such aid alongside Mexico. To pay for these supplies, the Republicans spent US$500 million in gold reserves. In 1936, the Bank of Spain had the world's fourth-largest gold reserve, worth approximately US$750 million, although some of its assets were frozen by the French and British governments. According to an official Soviet source, more than 2,000 members of the Soviet Armed Forces served in Spain, many of them being awarded the Soviet honours and 59 being awarded the title Hero of the Soviet Union.

The largest number of Soviets in Spain at any time is believed to have been 700, and the total during the war is thought to have been between 2,000 and 3,000; they were primarily tank crews and pilots, and fought in direct combat. Estimates for the pilots of Spanish Republican Air Force from the Soviet Union who took part in the conflict are given at 1,000. The Republicans sent their gold reserve to the Soviet Union to pay for arms and supplies. The reserve was worth $500,000,000 in 1939 prices. In 1956, the Soviet Union announced that Spain still owed it $50,000,000. Other estimates of Soviet and Comintern aid totaled £81,000,000 ($405,000,000) at 1939 values. The German military attaché estimated that Soviet and Comintern aid amounted to the following:

- 242 aircraft,
- 703 pieces of artillery,
- 731 tanks,
- 1,386 trucks,
- 300 armored cars
- 15,000 heavy machine guns,
- 500,000 rifles,
- 30,000 sub-machine guns,
- 4,000,000 artillery shells,
- 1,000,000,000 machine gun cartridges,
- over 69,000 tons of war material, and
- over 29,000 tons of ammunition.

Much of the material was purchased in France, Czechoslovakia, the United States, the United Kingdom and Mexico. The Republicans were continuously swindled and shortchanged in their dealings with the Soviets, and the Soviet Union's conduct was characterised by the historian Gerald Howson characterised as "treacherous and indefensible". The Republicans also made poor choices in buying ammunition. The arms trade has a standard that with every rifle, 1,000 rounds of ammunition are included; with every machine gun, 10,000 rounds are included; and with every artillery piece, 2,400 shells are included to prevent the hardware from becoming useless by a lack of ammunition. However, many of the purchases fell far short of that standard.

Soviet foreign policy considered collective security against German fascism to be a priority, and the Comintern had agreed a similar approach in 1934. It walked a thin line between pleasing France and not being seen to hinder both the world revolution and communist ideals. It was also the time of the first significant Soviet trials of the Old Bolsheviks. The Soviet press and opposition groups were entirely against non-interventionism.

Another significant Soviet involvement was the activity of the People's Commissariat for Internal Affairs (NKVD) in the Republican rearguard. Communist figures including Vittorio Vidali ("Comandante Contreras"), Iosif Grigulevich, Mikhail Koltsov and most prominently Aleksandr Mikhailovich Orlov led operations that included the murder of the Catalan anti-Stalinist communist politician Andrés Nin. Another NKVD-led operation was the shooting down in December 1936 of the French aircraft in which the delegate of the International Committee of the Red Cross (ICRC), Georges Henny, carried extensive documentation on the Paracuellos massacres to France.

=== Poland ===
Polish arms sales to Republican Spain took place between September 1936 and February 1939. Politically, Poland did not support any side of the war, but over time, the Polish government increasingly tended to prefer the Nationalists. Sales to the Republicans were motivated exclusively by economic interest. Since Poland was bound by non-intervention obligations, Polish governmental officials and the military disguised sales as commercial transactions mediated by international brokers and targeting customers in various countries, principally in Latin America; 54 shipments from Gdańsk and Gdynia were identified. Most hardware were obsolete and worn-out second-rate but some modern arms were also delivered; all were 20-30% overpriced. Polish sales amounted to $40 million and constituted some 5-7% of the overall Republican military spendings, but in terms of quantity certain categories of weaponry like machine guns, they might have accounted for 50% of all arms delivered. After the Soviet Union, Poland was the second largest arms supplier for the Republic. After the Soviet Union, Italy and Germany, Poland was the fourth-largest arms supplier to Spain.

Poland also sold 44 obsolete or non-combat aircraft to the Nationalists via Portugal (20 PWS-10 training fighters, 20 Breguet XIX light bombers, 4 RWD-13 liaison aircraft).

=== Greece ===
Greece maintained formal diplomatic relations with the Republic, but Ioannis Metaxas's dictatorship sympathised with the Nationalists. Greece joined the non-intervention policy in August 1936, but from the onset, the government connived at arms sales to both sides. The official vendor was Pyrkal, or Greek Powder and Cartridge Company (GPCC), and the key personality behind the deal was the head of the GPCC, Prodromos Bodosakis-Athanasiadis. The company partially took advantage of the earlier Schacht Plan, a German-Greek credit agreement that enabled Greek purchases from Rheinmetall-Borsig; some German products were later re-exported to Republican Spain. However, GPCC was selling also its own arms, as the company operated a number of factories and partially from Spanish sales, it became the largest Greek company.

Most Greek sales went to the Republic. For the Spaniards the deals were negotiated by Grigori Rosenberg, the son of well-known Soviet diplomat, and Máximo José Kahn Mussabaun, the Spanish representative in the Thessaloniki consulate. Shipments set off usually from Piraeus; were camouflaged at a deserted island; and, with changed flags, they proceeded officially to ports in Mexico. It is known that sales continued from August 1936 to at least November 1938. The exact number of shipments is unknown but remained significant since by November 1937, 34 Greek ships were declared to be non-compliant with the non-intervention agreement, and the Nationalist Navy seized 21 vessels in 1938 alone. Details of sales to the Nationalists are unclear, but they were known to be by far fewer.

The total worth of Greek sales is unknown. One author claims that in 1937 alone, GPCC shipments amounted to $10.9 million for the Republicans and $2.7 million for the Nationalists and that in late 1937 Bodosakis signed another contract with the Republicans for £2.1 million (around $10 million), but it is not clear whether the ammunition that was contracted was delivered. The arms sold included artillery (such as 30 pieces of 155 mm guns), machine guns (at least 400), cartridges (at least 11 m), bombs (at least 1,500) and explosives (at least 38 tons of TNT). AEKKEA-RAAB, a Greek aviation company, also sold at least 60 aircraft to the Republican Air Force, consisting of R-29 fighters and R-33 trainers.

=== Mexico ===
The Mexican government supported fully and publicly the Spanish Republic. Mexico refused to follow the French and British non-intervention proposals. Mexican President Lázaro Cárdenas saw the war as similar as the Mexican Revolution, although Mexican society was divided, with support for each faction in the army.

The Mexican government's attitude was an immense moral comfort to the Republic, especially since major Latin American governments (Colombia, Brazil, Nicaragua, El Salvador, Haiti, Dominican Republic, Bolivia, Argentina, Chile and Peru) sympathised more or less openly with the Nationalists. However, Mexican aid could mean relatively little in practical terms since the French border was closed, and the German, Italian and Portuguese dictators remained free to supply the Nationalists with a quality and a quantity of weapons that went far beyond the power of Mexico, which could furnish only $2,000,000 in aid. Mexico provided only some material assistance, which included rifles, food and a few American-made aircraft, such as the Bellanca CH-300 and the Spartan Zeus, which had served in the Mexican Air Force.

=== France ===
On 21 August 1936, France signed the Non-Intervention Agreement. However, Leon Blum's government provided some aircraft to the Republicans by covert means. Potez 540 bomber aircraft (nicknamed the "Flying Coffin") by Spanish Republican pilots, Dewoitine aircraft, and Loire 46 fighter aircraft were sent from 7 August to December 1936 to Republican forces. The French also sent pilots and engineers to the Republicans. Also, until 8 September 1936, aircraft could freely pass from France into Spain if they had been bought in other countries. In total, France delivered 70 aircraft.

=== Other countries ===
Other countries selling arms to the Republicans included Czechoslovakia and Estonia. Also, $2,000,000 came from the United States for humanitarian purposes.

=== International volunteers ===
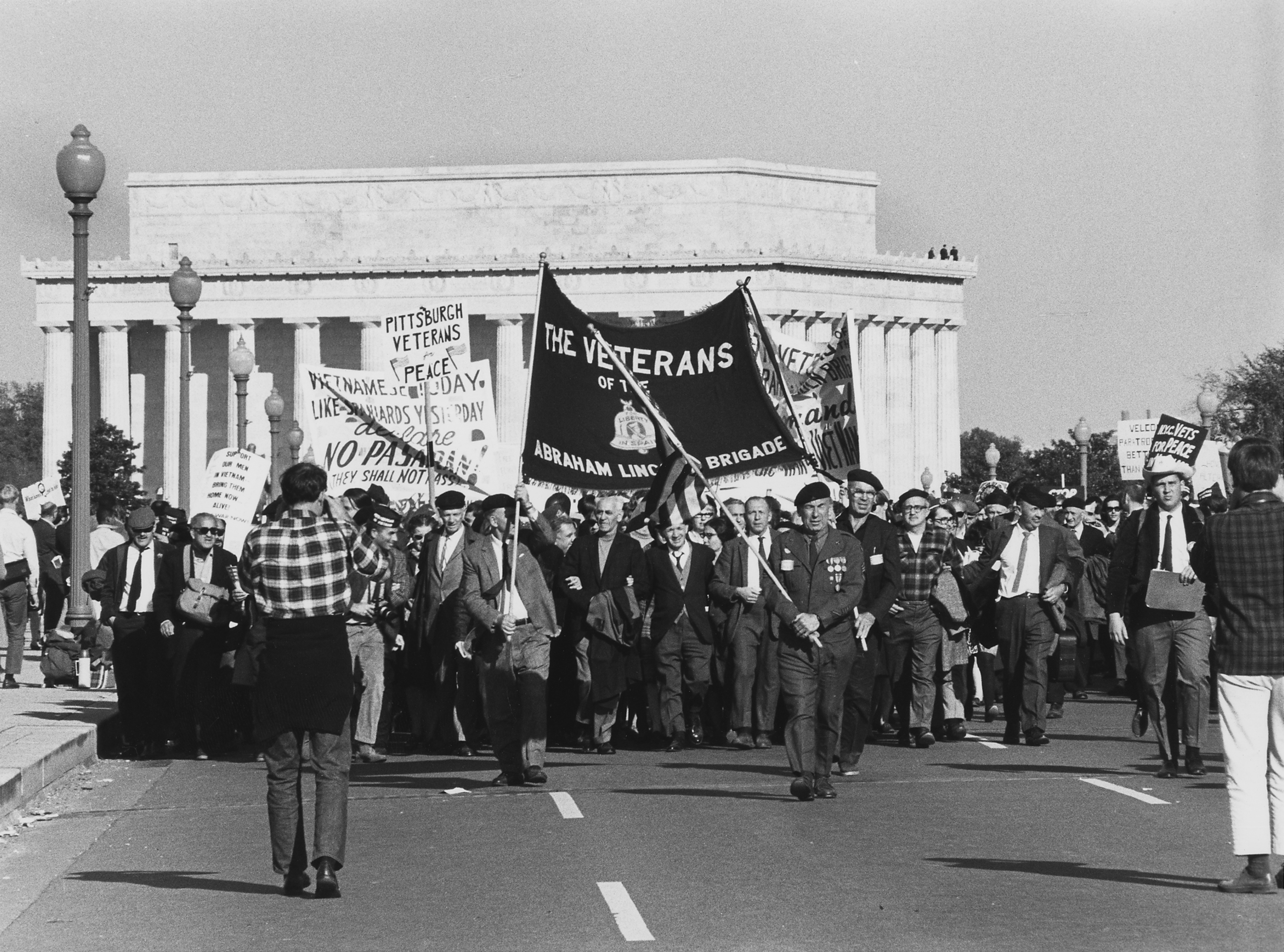
Veterans of the Abraham Lincoln Brigade in the 1967 March on the Pentagon

Volunteers from many countries fought in Spain, most of them for the Republicans. About 32,000 fought in the International Brigades, including the American Lincoln Battalion and the Canadian Mackenzie–Papineau Battalion, which were organised in close conjunction with the Comintern to aid the Spanish Republicans. Perhaps another 3,000 fought as members of the Confederación Nacional del Trabajo (CNT) and the Workers' Party of Marxist Unification (POUM) militias. Those fighting with POUM most famously included George Orwell and the small ILP Contingent. Around 2,000 Portuguese leftists fought for the Republicans and were spread throughout different units.

"Spain" became the cause célèbre for the left-leaning intelligentsia across the Western world, and many prominent artists and writers entered the Republic's service. As well, it attracted a large number of foreign left-wing working-class men for whom the war offered not only an idealistic adventure but also an escape from Great Depression unemployment. Among the more famous foreigners participating for the Republic was George Orwell, who went on to write about his experiences in Homage to Catalonia. Orwell's novel Animal Farm was loosely inspired by his experiences and those of other members of POUM at the hands of Stalinists when infighting arose within the Popular Front. His experiences also inspired the torture scenes in his Nineteen Eighty-Four. Ernest Hemingway's novel For Whom the Bell Tolls was inspired by his experiences in Spain. George Seldes reported on the war for the New York Post. The third part of Laurie Lee's autobiographical trilogy, A Moment of War, is also based on his Civil War experiences. Norman Bethune used the opportunity to develop the special skills of battlefield medicine. As a casual visitor, Errol Flynn used a fake report of his death at the battlefront to promote his movies. In the Philippines, a pro-Republican magazine, Democracia, had writers, including antifascist Spaniards, Filipino-Spaniards and Filipino progressives such as Pedro Abad Santos, the chairman of the Socialist Party of the Philippines, and Bishop Gregorio Aglipay, of the Philippine Independent Church.

==== International Brigades ====
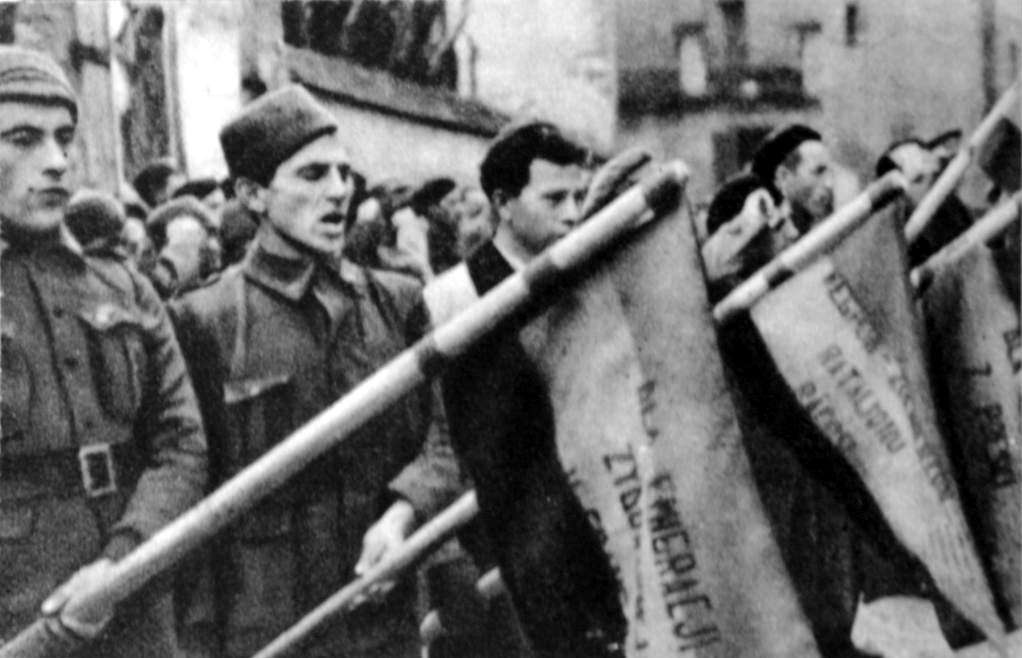
Polish volunteers fighting for the Republic.

Around 32,000 foreigners fought in the communist International Brigades. An estimated 3,000 volunteers fought in other Republican forces during the conflict. Additionally, about 10,000 foreigners participated in medical, nursing and engineering capacities.

The International Brigades included 9,000 Frenchmen, of whom 1,000 died; 5,000 Germans and Austrians, of whom 2,000 died; The third-highest number was from Italy with 3,350 men. Then came Poland, with about 3,000 men. Then the United States (2,800 men with 900 killed and 1,500 wounded) and the United Kingdom (2,000 with 500 killed and 1,200 wounded). There were also 1,500 Czechoslovaks, 1,500 Yugoslavs, 1,500 Canadians, 1,000 Hungarians, and 1,000 Scandinavians (about half of whom were Swedes), 100 Chinese also volunteered, as well as another 800 Swiss, 300 of whom would later be killed. The rest came from a claimed 53 countries About 90 Mexicans participated, and at least 80 Irishmen (fighting mostly within the International Brigades). Future Albanian Prime Minister Mehmet Shehu would also serve as a volunteer for the Republicans in the Spanish Civil War.

It has been estimated that between 3,000 and 10,000 of the volunteers were Jews from various countries. About 200 volunteers were from Palestine (of both Jewish and Arab origin).

Historians debate the presence of 1000 Arab volunteers. However, the Catalan historian Andreu Castells, who has conducted extensive research into the topic, found 716 recorded cases. Many of the Arabs who volunteered were registered as French citizens, as many North African countries were still under colonial rule when the Spanish Civil War broke out. Additionally, Arabic names were commonly misspelled and therefore registered multiple times. Roughly half of the Arabs who volunteered in Spain were Algerian, with 493 joining the Republican forces, of which 332 survived. Alongside those there were 211 Moroccans, 11 Syrians, four Palestinians including Palestinian journalist Najati Sidqi, three Egyptians, two Iraqis and one Lebanese man also took up arms for the International Brigades. The motivations behind Arab participation in the Spanish Civil War are varied. However, most likely they saw that a Republican victory in Spain would lead to the decolonisation of the Arab world in the longer term.

Approximately a third of Irishmen who fought for Republicans died, primarily socialists, trade unionists, and former IRA members. The "Connolly Column" of the International Brigades was named after James Connolly, an Irish socialist leader who had been executed by the British for participating in the 1916 Easter Rising. Both Nationalist and Republican Irish Volunteers were led by former Irish Republican Army members.

A 47-year-old man from Turkey named Mustafa İbrahim would serve in the 14th International Brigade.

== Patriotism invoked to oppose invaders ==
Patriotism was invoked by both sides, which presented the struggle as one of the Spanish people against foreign invaders.

The instrumental use of nationalism by the Republicans came from the communists. The heroic Spanish people were said to be rising against foreign invaders, who were directed by traitors belonging to the upper classes, the clergy and the army, which were now at the service of the "fascist-imperialist world coalition". The "true" Spain was represented by the lower classes. Outside the "nation in arms" were bourgeois traitors, fascists, clergymen and "false revolutionaries" (dissident communists, radicals, anarchists etc.), who were "serving fascism". With the exception of the anti-Stalinist communists of the POUM, Nationalist rhetoric that was developed by the Communist Party of Spain soon extended to other left-wing and Republican literature. Republican propaganda made use of pre-existing icons that depicted foreigners in certain ways. The Italians were presented as effeminate, cowardly and presumptuous and the Germans as arrogant. The Foreign Legionnaires were presented as an international mob of criminals and thieves. Cartoons in the Republican press often depicted the rebel army as a multinational gang of foreign mercenaries. The presence of Moorish troops was exploited from the outbreak of the conflict, and they were presented as black-faced, barefoot, hungry and eager to steal and kill: "The Moors were supposedly wild and cowardly, uncivilized and anxious to rape white women; the memory of the Reconquista, the centuries-long Spanish struggle against the Moors, was invoked. Only a few appeals during the first months of the war were aimed at convincing the 'Moorish proletarian brother' to desert".Hugh Thomas The Spanish Civil War

Nationalist sentiment was used by the Nationalists to present the struggle as one for the Spanish patria (fatherland) and its Catholic essence, which stated to be under the threat of becoming a "Russian colony", the fault being of traitors and "international agents". "Anti-Spain" was embodied by liberalism, atheism, freemasonry, international Jewry and regional separatism. The communist invader was a dehumanised foreigner, the "wolves of the Russian Steppes". A legionnaire officer emphasised that the war was one "of Spaniards against Russians!" Francoist propaganda presented the enemy as an invading army or the puppet of foreign powers. The involvement of Moorish troops in a Catholic crusade was explained by the Nationalists as that of defenders of religion in the face of the godless, anticlerical, anti-Islamic and Jewish supporters of the Republic. Nationalists were forced to ignore Rif War propaganda, which had presented Moors as brutal and savage. The presence of Italian and German troops on the rebels' side was hidden as much as possible.

== Foreign correspondents ==
Foreign press coverage of the Spanish Civil War was extensive, with around 1000 foreign newspaper correspondents working from Spain.

== See also ==
- International relations (1919–1939)
- SS Cantabria
- Palafox Battalion
  - Naftali Botwin Company
- Dates of establishment of diplomatic relations with Francoist Spain

Military forces and aid

- Corpo Truppe Volontarie – Italian expeditionary forces
  - Regio Esercito Italiano – Royal Italian Army
  - Aviazione Legionaria (Aviation Legion) – Italian expeditionary air force
  - Regia Aeronautica Italiana – Royal Italian Air Force
  - La Regia Marina Italiana – Royal Italian Navy
- Legion Condor – German expeditionary forces
  - Luftwaffe – German air force
  - Heer – German army
  - Kriegsmarine – German navy submarine units
- Fuerza Aérea de la República Española (FARE) – Second Republic and Soviet Air forces
- Polish Brigade in Spain – Dąbrowszczacy
- Yugoslav volunteers in the Spanish Civil War

Military operations

- Operation Ursula – Uboat
- Operation Rügen – Legion Condor

Economic aid and dealings

- Rio Tinto Mining Concern
- Moscow gold
