= Viva la Quinta Brigada =

Song by Christy Moore

Song by Christy Moore

from the album Ride On
- Released: 1984
- Genre: Folk, traditional Irish
- Length: 5:31
- Label: WEA Ireland
- Songwriter: Christy Moore

"Viva la Quinta Brigada" is a song by Christy Moore about the Irishmen who fought in the Spanish Civil War against Franco. It was released in 1984 on the album Ride On. The title was changed to "Viva la Quince Brigada" in some later recordings.

The song is about the Irish socialist volunteers, who were a small contingent within the 15th International Brigade, and who in later years became known as the Connolly Column.

This song is unrelated to the song titled "Viva la Quince Brigada" that was recorded by Pete Seeger and the Almanac Singers in the early 1940s. That song is a variation of a Spanish song about the Spanish Civil War, "¡Ay Carmela!." The title of Moore's song was inspired by the phrase "Viva la Quince Brigada" in "¡Ay Carmela!"

Moore's song was inspired by Spanish Civil War veteran Michael O'Riordan's 1979 book Connolly Column.

Moore said: "Without Michael O'Riordan I'd never have been able to write Viva la Quince Brigada. I must have performed the song over a thousand times and every single time I sing it I think of Mick and wonder how can I ever thank him enough. In Spain in 1983 I was reading his book, Connolly Column – the story of the Irishmen who fought for the Spanish Republic, and I began this song as I read on. The song was lifted entirely from his book.

Moore's original song title - which translates as "Long live the Fifth Brigade" - was a slip due to the similarity in Spanish between "quinta" (fifth) and "quince" (fifteen). The bulk of Irish volunteers served with the XV (Fifteen) International Brigade; the "Fifth Brigade" was not one of the International Brigades. The song later appeared listed as Viva la Quince Brigada as Moore corrected the mistake in subsequent recordings.

== See also ==
- Irish Socialist Volunteers in the Spanish Civil War
- Connolly Column
- Michael O'Riordan
- ¡Ay Carmela!, different Spanish Civil War song sometimes known as "Viva la Quinta Brigada"
