= Connolly Column =

Volunteers in the Second Spanish Republic

Memorial to Limerick men who fought in the International Brigades, erected outside Limerick City Hall in 2014.

The Connolly Column (Spanish: Columna Connolly, Irish: Colún Uí Chonghaile) was the name given to a group of Irish republican socialist volunteers who fought for the Second Spanish Republic in the International Brigades during the Spanish Civil War. They were named after James Connolly, the executed leader of the Irish Citizen Army. They draw the column part of the name from the name for local IRA units. They were a company-strength unit of the XV International Brigade, which also included the US, British and Latin American battalions in Spain. The name is now retroactively applied to all Irish volunteers who fought for the Spanish Republic.

== Origins ==
On the outbreak of the Spanish Civil War in July 1936, support for the Spanish Republic grew among left-wing organizations, taking tangible form in a decision in September 1936 to form an International Brigade of volunteers to fight with the Republican government against the fascist-dominated Nationalist rebels. This decision was echoed in Ireland by various left-wing groups; the chief organizers of this effort were Sean Murray, Peadar O'Donnell, and Frank Ryan.

Murray was chairman of the Communist Party of Ireland (CPI) at the time, and a fine orator. He was in contact with Bill Scott, a volunteer with the Thälmann Battalion who sent regular reports of conditions in Spain, and which Murray published in the party newspaper, The Worker.

O'Donnell, a socialist and Irish republican, was in Barcelona for the "People's Olympics" – held in opposition to the Olympic Games being held in Berlin under the Nazi regime. O'Donnell sympathised with the anarchist workers' militia that defeated the attempted military coup in the city and joined one of their militias on the Aragon front. On his return to Ireland, O'Donnell urged the formation of Irish volunteer regiments to support the Popular Front government.

Ryan had fought during the Irish Civil War and was a member of the communist-orientated Republican Congress, and had also been a member of the Irish Republican Army (IRA). He was keen to form a volunteer group to join the International Brigades and fight.

Most of the Irish volunteers came from the Republican Congress. From the period of 1925–1931, the IRA received money from the Soviet Union in return for spying on the United Kingdom and the United States. This had led to many Communist Party of Ireland members joining and even setting up front groups such as Saor Éire. This attempt to form a synthesis of republican and communist concerns had largely failed and within the IRA the communist element declined in prominence by the early 1930s, leading these people to found the separate Republican Congress.

== Motivation ==
As well as sympathy for the Spanish Republic, many Irish Republican volunteers were also motivated by enmity towards the Irish Brigade, an 800-strong force that volunteered in late 1936 to fight on the Spanish Nationalist side. This antagonism dated back to the Irish Civil War of 1922–23, when some of the predecessors of the two factions had fought on opposing sides. In 1932–33 small groups of IRA men and Blueshirts had fought each other in the streets with fists, bats and occasionally guns; the Blueshirts were outlawed in 1933.

Some of these men on both sides saw the Spanish conflict as a continuation of Ireland's own civil war. Neither group had a candidate elected in any Irish elections, despite the hardships of the Great Depression. Already a small group, some left-leaning IRA or ex-IRA men had formed the breakaway Republican Congress in 1934, which also divided later that year.

Not all the volunteers were Irish Republicans, however, as the Irish International Brigaders included many other strains of socialist and left-wing ideology. They even included a communist ex-clergyman, Robert Hilliard, who was killed at Jarama.

Bill Gannon, former IRA member who had been among the assassins of Justice Minister Kevin O'Higgins in 1927, and who later joined the Irish Communist Party, had a major role in the recruitment and organising.

== In Spain ==
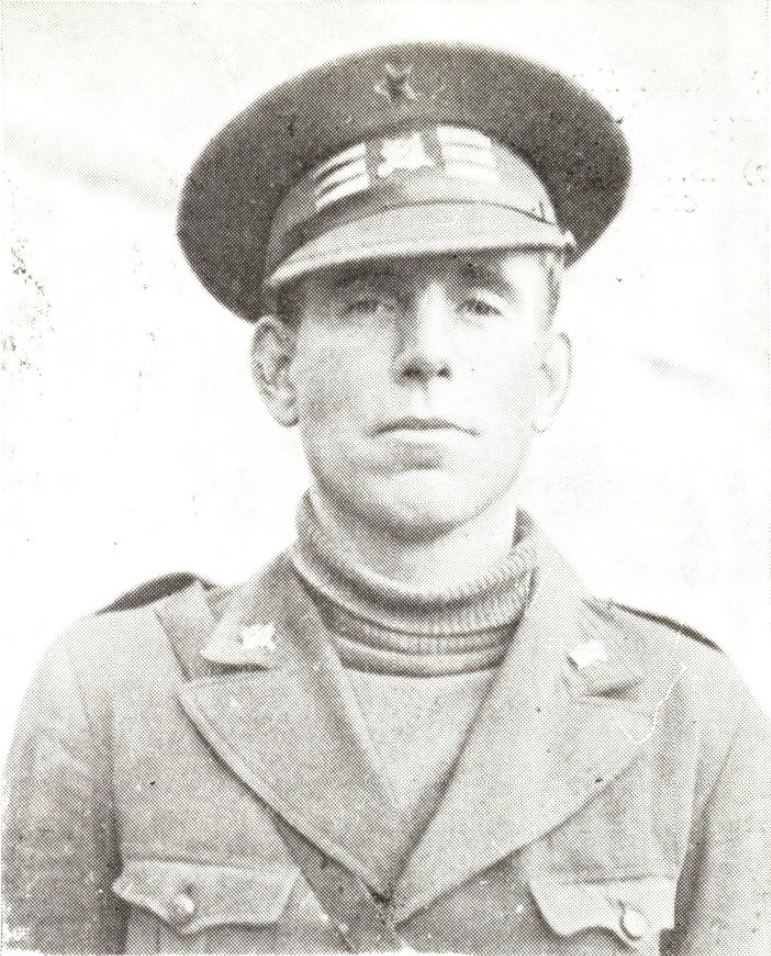
Paddy O'Daire, a senior officer in the Connolly Column

James Stranney's grave in Milltown Cemetery, Belfast. Stranney was killed in action in 1938.

In December 1936, a group of eighty volunteers, led by Frank Ryan, arrived in Spain. The majority came from the Irish Free State, but there were also a group of republican socialists from Belfast and other parts of Northern Ireland. Those who went included Michael O'Riordan, Charles Donnelly, Frank Conroy, Eddie O'Flaherty, Paul Burns, Jackie Hunt, Bill Henry, Eamon McGrotty, Bill Beattie, Paddy Roe McLaughlin, Bill Henry, Peter O'Connor, Peter Power, Johnny Power, Patrick Smith, Liam Tumilson, Jim Stranney, Willie O'Hanlon, Ben Murray Fred McMahon and Tommy Wood, aged 17. Many were members of the Communist Party of Ireland, and Wood was a member of Fianna Éireann. After travelling through southern France by train to Perpignan, they assembled in Madrigueras and in December 1936 constituted the "James Connolly Centuria" of the International Brigade, colloquially known as the "Connolly Column". The unit first saw action on the Andalusian front near Cordova as part of the 12th (French) IB battalion where they helped repulse a Nationalist attack. Later that month they fought at the Battle of Madrid, where they lost a number of men.

In January 1937 the unit was re-organized, with new recruits from Ireland and elsewhere, and placed with the newly-formed (English-speaking) XV (Abraham Lincoln) Brigade. The Connolly's formed a company of the British Battalion, but some Irish volunteers refused to serve in the battalion due to their republican convictions. Ryan wrote of the importance of workers solidarity outweighing national sentiment, though he also on one occasion threatened to shoot an English volunteer when he found out that he had served in the Black and Tans during the Irish War of Independence. As a result of these tensions, many of the Irish volunteers left the battalion to join the mostly American Lincoln Battalion, which was also of the XV Brigade. There they formed the "James Connolly Unit", while other Irish volunteers fought in the Saklatvala Battalion and other units of the brigade. With the XV Brigade, the Connolly's suffered heavy losses at the Battle of Jarama, near Madrid, in February 1937. Charlie Donnelly, Eamon McGrotty, Bill Henry, Liam Tumilson and Bill Beattie were all killed during this battle. Frank Ryan was also badly wounded at Jarama in February 1937 and returned to Ireland to recuperate. On his return to Spain he was appointed adjutant to the Republican General José Miaja.

In June 1937 they went into reserve, where they were joined by men from the Anglo-American company of 20th Battalion which had fought earlier near Pozoblanco in southern Spain. In July the XV Brigade took part in the battle of Brunete, where the Saktvala battalion suffered 450 casualties; the Connolly's, fighting around Villanueva de Canada, lost 7 men killed and many others wounded. In August XV Brigade was fought the Battle of Belchite, where Paddy O'Daire of the Connolly's took command of the British Battalion during the battle following the wounding of Peter Daly. In October they moved to the Aragón offensive front, a quiet sector, but in January 1938 they took part in the Battle of Teruel. In March, during the battle of Gandesa, they were forced to retreat when the front collapsed, with Ryan captured on 1 April and held at the Miranda del Ebro detention camp. He was sentenced to death but after representations from Éamon de Valera his sentence was commuted to thirty years hard labour.

In July 1938 the Connolly's fought their last battle; en route for home after the Spanish Republican government agreed to repatriate all foreign soldiers, the Connolly Column returned to the front to take part in the Battle of Ebro the last, doomed, Republican offensive of the war. The surviving Irish volunteers were repatriated to Ireland after September 1938, when the Republican government disbanded the International Brigades in the vain hope of securing military aid from other democracies and of getting the fascist troops from Italy and Germany to withdraw. Michael O'Riordan went on to become General Secretary of the Communist Party of Ireland in 1970. Though a small unit, sources differ on the numbers involved. The Brigade's British and Irish roll of honour lists 36 Irishmen killed in Spain in the war. O'Riordan listed 145 men, and "..of that number 61 never came back". Returning to Dublin, Connolly Column was greeted by the solitary figure of Fr. Michael O'Flanagan, who unveiled a banner in their honour.

== Related material ==
Christy Moore's song "Viva la Quince Brigada" is about the Irish volunteers who fought with the International Brigades in the Spanish Civil War, and was inspired by Michael O'Riordan's book, Connolly Column.

== See also ==
- Irish Brigade (Spanish Civil War)
- Irish socialist volunteers in the Spanish Civil War
- International response to the Spanish Civil War
- Irish involvement in the Spanish Civil War
- Ireland–Spain relations

== Bibliography ==
- Cronin, Séan. 1980. Frank Ryan: The search for The Republic. Dublin: Repsol. ISBN 0-86064-018-3.
- Doyle, Bob. 2006. Brigadista: An Irishman's Fight Against Fascism. Dublin: Currach Press. ISBN 1-85607-937-6.
- Hoar, Adrian. 2004. In Green and Red: The Lives of Frank Ryan. Kerry: Brandon. ISBN 0-86322-332-X.
- McGarry, Fearghal. 1999. Irish Politics and the Spanish Civil War. Cork: Cork University Press. ISBN 1-85918-239-9.
- Ó Duinnín, Eoghan. 1986. La Niña Bonita agus an Róisín Dubh. Dublin: An Clóchomhar.
- O'Riordan, Michael. 2005 [2nd edition]. Connolly Column: The story of the Irishmen who fought for the Spanish Republic 1936–1939. Torfaen: Warren & Pell. ISBN 0-9548904-2-6.
