= Y. P. I. Kaila =

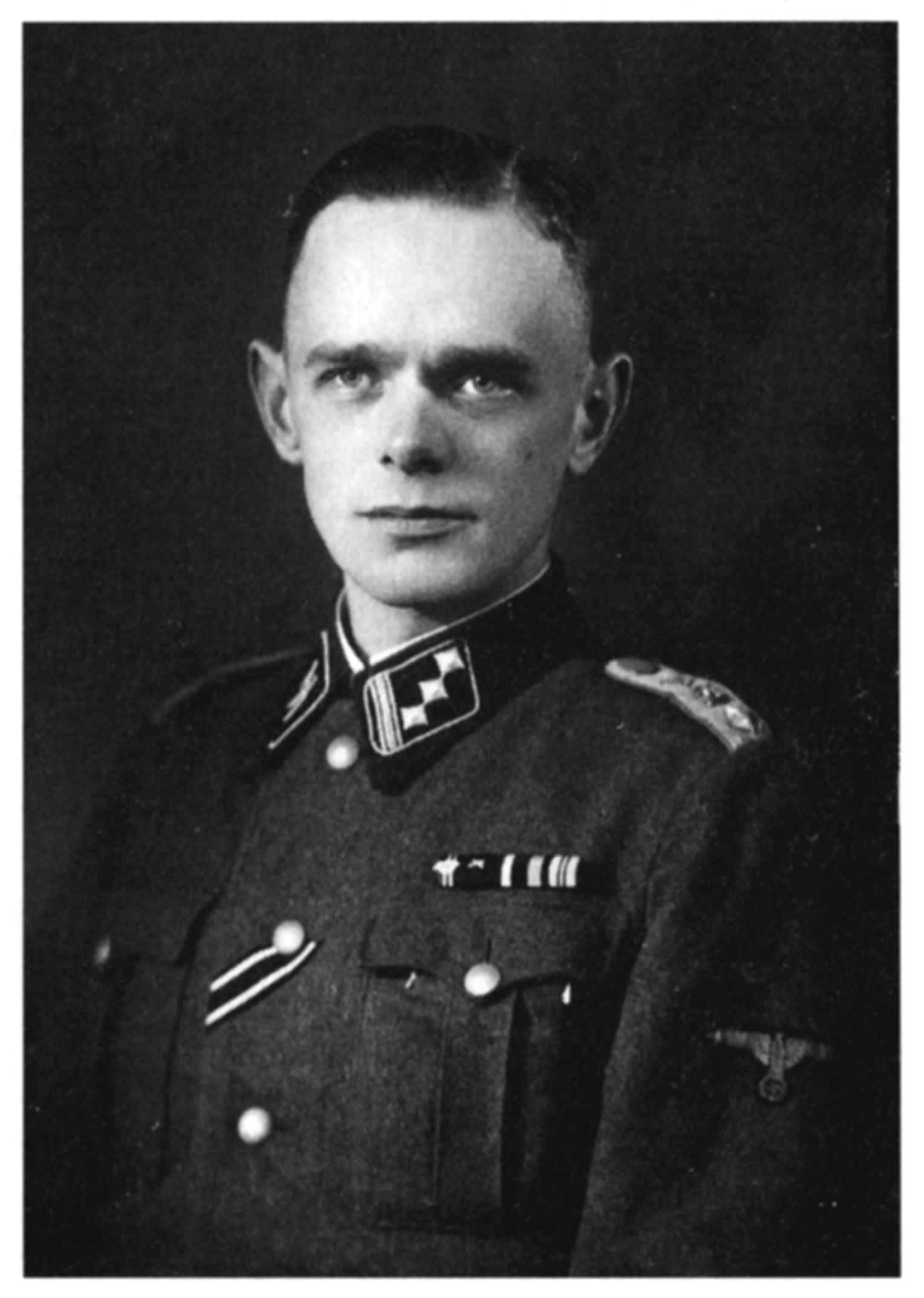

Yrjö Paavo Ilmari (YPI) Kaila ( 30 July 1912 Helsinki – 21 January 2003 Helsinki) was a Finnish major who fought in Franco's forces during the Spanish Civil War and later in the SS Wiking Division in Ukraine.

== Education ==
Kaila graduated from Töölö co-educational school in 1931. Kaila attended the Cadet School 1933–1935.

== Career ==
He then served as an officer in the North Savo Regiment, PPP 2 and JP 2, the Karelian Guard Regiment and the Kannas Military District Headquarters. During the Winter War, Kaila served in JR 5 and during the Continuation War he was in JP 3 as a company commander and as a company commander and battalion commander in the Regiment JR 8.

Kaila also participated in the Mäntsälä rebellion.

Kaila participated in the Spanish Civil War 1938–1939 on the side of the Falangists. He resigned from the armed forces and secretly traveled to Spain, fighting in the Spanish Foreign Legion. In September 1938, Kaila was wounded in the thigh. During the Continuation War, in 1941–1942, Kaila was in the ranks of the SS Wiking division, fighting in Ukraine. He was awarded the Iron Cross for having crossed the Dnieper river alone. Kaila reached the rank of Hauptsturmführer in the Waffen SS.

After the end of the war, Kaila was arrested because he had participated in the Weapons Cache Case and spent three months in the prison in Helsinki, waiting for the verdict. However, Kaila was released without a trial, but had to resign from the service.

After the war, he worked as a department chief in the Finnish plywood association.

== Burial ==
Kaila is buried in the Espoo Cathedral cemetery.

== In popular culture ==
Kaila served as the inspiration for the officer Lammio in the Finnish classic The Unknown Soldier (novel).
