= Paddy Roe McLaughlin =

Irish Republican

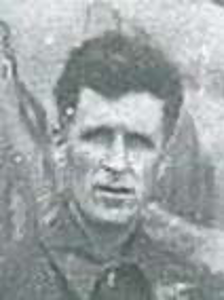
- Paddy Roe McLaughlin c. 1937

Personal details
- Born: Patrick McLaughlin; 17 December 1902 Lecamey, County Donegal, Ireland
- Died: 29 September 1974 (aged 71) Liverpool, England
- Party: Communist Party of Great Britain
- Other political affiliations: Connolly Association

Military service
- Allegiance: Irish Republic; United States; (Second Spanish Republic) Spanish Republic (1936–1938); United Kingdom (1940s)
- Branch/service: Irish Republican Army (until 1922); Anti-Treaty IRA (1922–1923); United States Army (1930s); International Brigades (1936–1938); Royal Air Force (1940s)
- Years of service: 1920s–1938; 1940s
- Unit: 69th Infantry Regiment, New York National Guard; Connolly Column, XV International Brigade
- Battles/wars: Irish War of Independence; Irish Civil War; Spanish Civil War: Battle of Jarama; World War II

Paddy Roe McLaughlin (17 December 1902 – 29 September 1974) was an Irish republican and left-wing political activist. He fought on the republican side during the Spanish Civil War.

== Early life ==
McLaughlin was born in Lecamey near Moville on the Inishowen peninsula, County Donegal on 17 December 1902. His parents, Thomas and Bridget McLaughlin, were small farmers. The family nickname was "Roe" to distinguish from the many other McLaughlin families in the region. He was educated at Falmore National School and was an altar boy at St John's Church, Ballinacrea. McLaughlin was a veteran of the War of Independence and was on the Anti-Treaty side during the Irish Civil War. He emigrated to Canada and later moved to the USA where he worked in construction on the New York subway during the 1930s. He also served in the 69th Infantry Regiment of the New York National Guard.

== Political activism ==
McLaughlin participated in protests in defence of the two Italian-born American anarchists, Nicolo Sacco and Bartolomeo Vanzetti outside the prison in the state of Massachusetts when they were executed on August 23, 1927. Both were accused of the killing of a shoe factory paymaster and a security guard during a robbery on April 15, 1920.

=== Spanish Civil War ===
Following the outbreak of the Spanish Civil War in 1936 he travelled from New York to London on board the Normandie, where he met up with over 40 other volunteers, including Peter Daly and Frank Edwards. From there they travelled to Spain to fight for the Second Spanish Republic in the XV international brigade (also known as the Abraham Lincoln Brigade) against Franco's fascist coup. McLaughlin fought at the Battle of Jarama where he lost his comrade and friend, Liam Tumilson.

== Later life ==
McLaughlin returned to England in 1938 and married Tumilson's fiancée, Kathleen Walsh. They had two children, including British far-right activist Michael McLaughlin. Paddy Roe was a founding member of the Connolly Association in England and both he and Kathleen were members of the Communist Party. On the outbreak of World War II he joined the Royal Air Force as a mechanic and was later employed at the Dounreay nuclear power station in North Scotland. Following the 1956 Soviet invasion of Hungary, Kathleen left the Communist Party disillusioned, while Paddy remained a member. He died in Liverpool in 1974. In 2013, McLaughlin was commemorated, along with other volunteers from Donegal, Londonderry and Tyrone, on a plaque erected on the facade of the Unite the Union building in Derry.

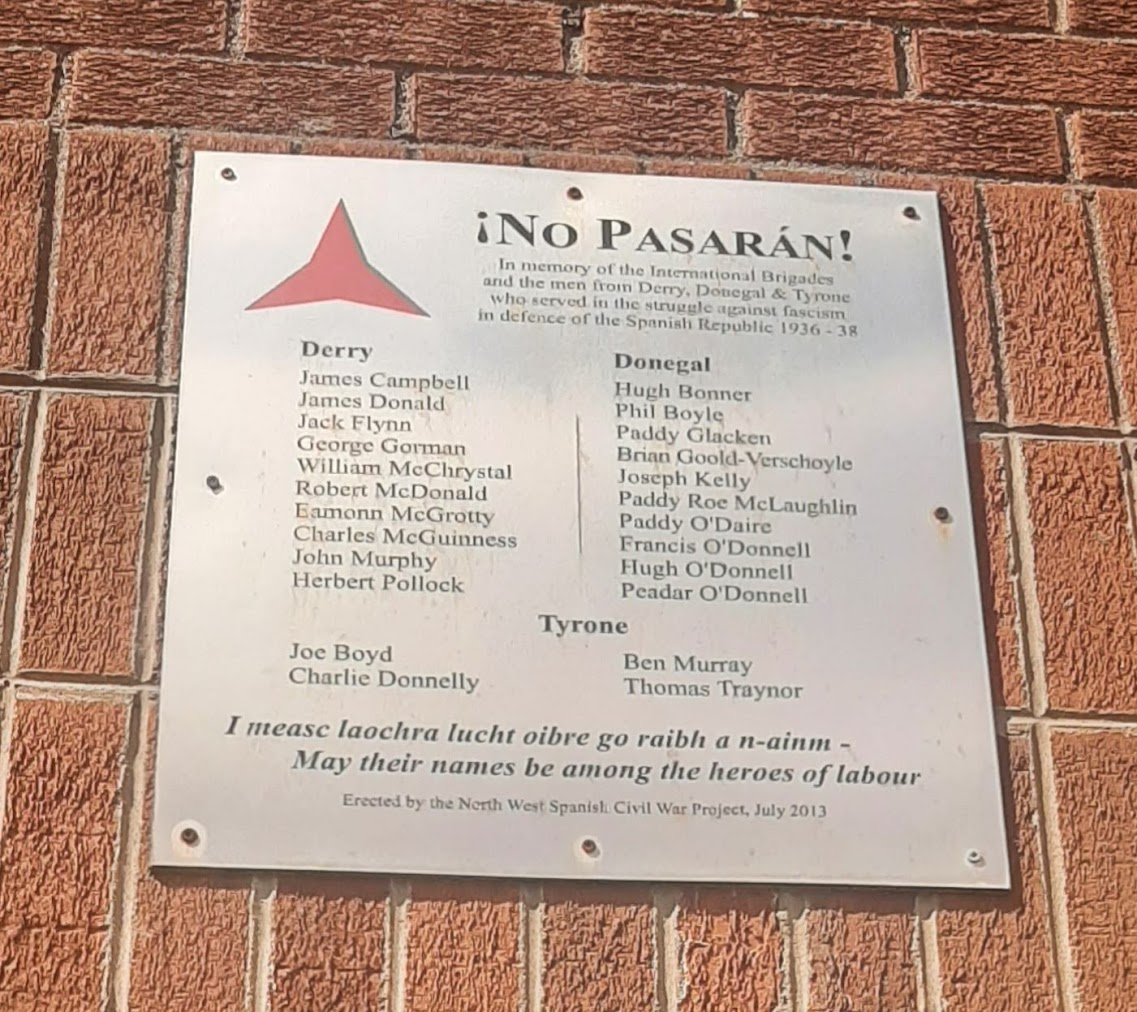
Plaque erected on the Unite the Union building in Derry commemorating volunteers on the republican side in the Spanish Civil War from the north west of Ireland
