= National Corporate Party =

Defunct Irish political party

National Corporate Party Cumann Corpruiteac Náisiúnta
- Secretary: Liam D. Walsh
- Director-General: Eoin O'Duffy
- Deputy Director-General: P.J. Coughlan
- Founded: 1935; 91 years ago
- Dissolved: 1937; 89 years ago
- Split from: Fine Gael
- Headquarters: Dublin, Ireland
- Paramilitary wing: Greenshirts
- Ideology: Irish republicanism Fascist corporatism Clerical fascism Anti-communism
- Political position: Far-right
- International affiliation: 1934 Montreux Fascist conference (observer)
- Colours: Green

The National Corporate Party (Irish: Cumann Corpruiteac Náisiúnta) was a fascist political party in Ireland founded by Eoin O'Duffy in June 1935 at a meeting of 500. It split from Fine Gael when O'Duffy was removed as leader of that party, which had been founded by the merger of O'Duffy's Blueshirts, formally known as the National Guard or Army Comrades Association, with Cumann na nGaedheal, and the National Centre Party. Its deputy leader was Colonel P.J. Coughlan of Cork. Its secretary was Captain Liam D. Walsh of Dublin.

The National Corporate Party wished to establish a corporate state in Ireland and was strongly anti-communist. Its military wing was the Greenshirts. Around eighty of the Blueshirts later became Greenshirts. The party raised funds through public dances. Unlike the Blueshirts, whose aim had been the establishment of a corporate state while remaining within the British Commonwealth in order to appease moderates within Fine Gael, the National Corporate Party was committed to the establishment of a republic outside of the British Empire with O'Duffy presenting his party as the true successor to the ideals of the Easter Rising. The party also committed itself to the preservation and promotion of the Irish language and Gaelic culture, something that would be echoed by a later fascist party in Ireland, Ailtirí na hAiséirghe.

The party had a populist set of policies including the adoption of a charter of rights for workers, profit sharing for workers along cooperative lines, the introduction of a minimum wage, the introduction of a 40-hour work week, the lowering of the old age pension age to 65, the creation of a second chamber of parliament which would represent vocational interests. O'Duffy expressed admiration for the Social Credit theories of Major C.H. Douglas.

The NCP failed to gain much support however, with the majority of Fine Gael members remaining loyal to that party and O'Duffy only securing a handful of loyal supporters for his group.

O'Duffy left Ireland in 1936 to lead a volunteer Irish Brigade in the Spanish Civil War. This consumed most of his attention and the party's resources were transformed to manage the Brigade enlistment. The Pearse Street headquarters of the Brigade's front group, the "Irish Crusade Against Communism", was the same address as the NCP whilst its party secretary Captain Liam Walsh managed the enlistment to the Brigade. O'Duffy planned to field veterans of the Spanish Brigade as candidates upon his return in the 1937 general election, but he was delayed in Spain for several months which caused his party to miss the election. He retired on his return in 1937. Without him, both the Greenshirts and National Corporate Party faded away. The party was defunct by 1937. Although O'Duffy indicated he would revive the party in December 1938, he did not. Some NCP supporters were involved in the short-lived Anti-Partition Party. O'Duffy was involved in the early stages of the launch of Coras na Poblachta, but played no further role.

== Sources ==
- The Greenshirts: fascism in the Irish Free State 1935-1945 - Queen Mary University of London
