= Eoin O'Duffy =

Irish political activist, general and Garda (1890–1944)

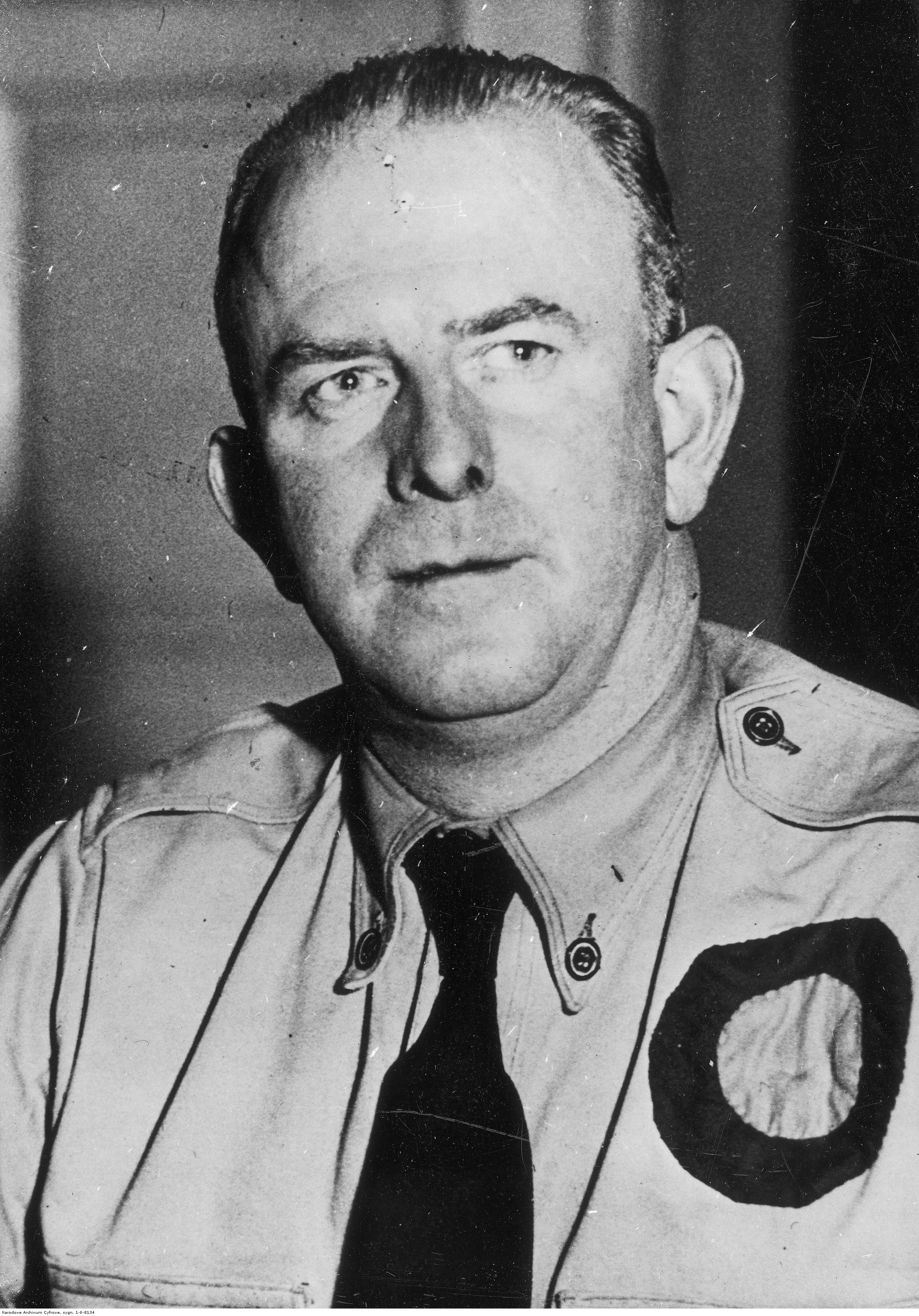
- O'Duffy in Blueshirt attire, c. 1934

Leader of Fine Gael
- In office 8 September 1933 – 18 September 1934
- Preceded by: Office established
- Succeeded by: W. T. Cosgrave

Garda Commissioner
- In office 30 September 1922 – February 1933
- Preceded by: Michael Staines
- Succeeded by: Eamon Broy

Teachta Dála
- In office May 1921 – August 1923
- Constituency: Monaghan

Personal details
- Born: Owen Duffy; 28 January 1890 Lough Egish, County Monaghan, Ireland
- Died: 30 November 1944 (aged 54) Dublin, Ireland
- Resting place: Glasnevin Cemetery, Dublin, Ireland
- Party: Sinn Féin (1917–1922); Fine Gael (1933–1934); National Corporate Party (1935–1937)

Military service
- Allegiance: Irish Republic; Irish Free State; Nationalist Spain
- Service: Irish Volunteers; Irish Republican Army; National Army; Irish Army; Irish Brigade
- Years of service: 1917–1933; 1936–1937
- Rank: General
- Commands: IRA: OC, Monaghan Brigade; Director of Organisation; Chief of Staff; National Army: Chief of Staff; GOC, South Western Command; Inspector General; General Officer Commanding the Forces
- Conflicts: Irish War of Independence; Irish Civil War; Spanish Civil War
- Eoin O'Duffy's voice Interview recorded 1932 in Liverpool, England

Eoin O'Duffy (born Owen Duffy; 28 January 1890 – 30 November 1944) was an Irish revolutionary, general, Garda, politician and fascist activist. O'Duffy was the leader of the Monaghan Brigade of the Irish Republican Army (IRA) and a prominent figure in the Ulster IRA during the Irish War of Independence. In this capacity, he became Chief of Staff of the IRA in 1922. He accepted the Anglo-Irish Treaty and as a general became Chief of Staff of the National Army in the Irish Civil War, on the pro-Treaty side.

He had been an early member of Sinn Féin and was elected a TD for Monaghan in the Second Dáil in 1921, supporting pro-Treaty Sinn Féin in the split of 1922. In 1923 he became associated with Cumann na nGaedheal.

He was appointed as the second Commissioner of the Garda Síochána in 1922, the police force of the new Irish Free State, serving until 1933. In 1924, during the Irish Army Mutiny, he was appointed as General Officer Commanding of the Irish Army, holding both roles until 1925.

In the 1930s O'Duffy became attracted to the various fascist movements on the continent. In 1933 O'Duffy took control of the paramilitary movement called Army Comrades Association, also known as the Blueshirts. When the Blueshirts merged with Cumann na nGaedhael and National Centre Party to form Fine Gael, O'Duffy began as the new party's first leader, remaining as such for 13 months. He subsequently raised the Irish Brigade to fight for the Nationalists in the Spanish Civil War as an act of Catholic solidarity and was inspired by Benito Mussolini's Italy to create the National Corporate Party. During the Second World War, he was clandestinely involved in pro-Axis circles but focused mostly on athletic administration in his capacity as president of the National Athletics and Cycling Association. He died in 1944.

O'Duffy was active in multiple sporting bodies, including the Gaelic Athletic Association and the Irish Olympic Council.

== Early life ==
Eoin O'Duffy was born Owen Duffy in Lough Egish, near Castleblayney, County Monaghan, on 28 January 1890 to an impoverished smallholder family. He was the youngest of seven children. His father, also named Owen Duffy, had inherited his six-hectare (15-acre) farm from his father Peter in 1888; however, the family were forced to farm conacre land and work on the roads to make ends meet. O'Duffy attended Laggan national school. He graduated to a school in Laragh where he developed an interest in the Gaelic Revival and attended night classes hosted by the Gaelic League. He was close to his mother, Bridget Fealy, who died of cancer when he was 12. O'Duffy was devastated by her death and he wore her ring for the rest of his life.

In 1909, he sat the king's scholarship examination for St Patrick's College, Dublin, but as a place was not assured, he applied to become a clerk in the county surveyor's office in Monaghan. O'Duffy decided to pursue a career as a surveyor and came fifth in the local government board examination in 1912. O'Duffy was appointed and moved to Newbliss to take up his new position. He later secured a post as an engineer.

== Involvement in sport ==
=== Ulster GAA ===
O'Duffy was a leading member of the Gaelic Athletic Association (GAA) in Ulster. He was appointed secretary of the Ulster Provincial Council in 1912. He later served as Treasurer of the GAA Ulster Council from 1921 to 1934. His important role in developing the GAA in Ulster is memorialised by the O'Duffy Terrace at the principal provincial stadium, St Tiernach's Park in Clones, County Monaghan. In December 2009 a plaque was erected in memory of O'Duffy in Aughnamullen. The plaque was unveiled by the President of the Ulster GAA Council, Tom Daly.

He was also a member of Harps' Gaelic football club.

=== Other sports ===
As well as being a prominent figure in Ulster GAA he was also active in other sports. He was President of the Irish Amateur Handball Association from 1926 to 1934, the National Athletic and Cycling Association from 1931 to 1934 (which he founded in 1922), and the Irish Olympic Council from 1931 to 1932.

O'Duffy believed in the ideal of "cleaned manliness". He said sport "cultivates in a boy habits of self-control [and] self-denial" and promotes "the cleanest and most wholesome of the instincts of youth". He said a lack of sport caused some boys to have "failed to keep their athleticism, but became weedy youths, smoking too soon, drinking too soon".

== Political activities ==
=== Irish Republican Army and Sinn Féin ===
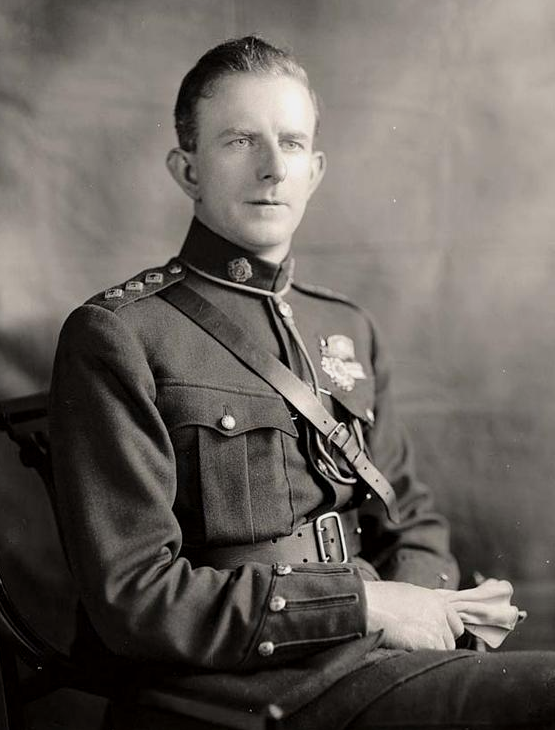
O'Duffy as Commissioner of the Garda Síochána, 1922

In 1917, O'Duffy joined the Irish Volunteers and took an active part in the Irish War of Independence, after that organisation became the Irish Republican Army (IRA). He rose rapidly through the ranks. He started as the Section Commander of the Clones Company, then Captain, then Commandant and finally appointed Brigadier in 1919. He came to the attention of Michael Collins, who enrolled him in the Irish Republican Brotherhood (IRB) and supported his advancement in the movement's hierarchy. One year later, Collins described O'Duffy as "the best man in Ulster". O'Duffy's senior involvement in the GAA and knowledge of Monaghan from his job as a surveyor proved invaluable for organisation and recruitment.

In 1918 O'Duffy became secretary of Sinn Féin's north Monaghan area council. On 14 September 1918 he and Daniel Hogan were arrested after a GAA match and charged with "illegal assembly". He was imprisoned in Belfast Prison and released on 19 November 1918. After his release O'Duffy focused on organising his brigade and built an effective intelligence network by cultivating contacts with susceptible RIC men. He was forced to go on the run after a RIC raid on his house in September 1919 but continued to draw his salary from the Monaghan County Council.

On 15 February 1920, he (along with Ernie O'Malley) was involved in the first capture of a Royal Irish Constabulary (RIC) barracks by the IRA in Ballytrain, in his native Monaghan. The raid boosted local IRA recruitment, shook RIC morale and resulted in the closure of many barracks in rural Monaghan. O'Duffy was once again arrested and imprisoned in Belfast Prison, where he went on hunger strike. He was released in June and arranged which Sinn Féin candidates would stand in Monaghan during the 1920 Irish local elections.

O'Duffy's brigade started raiding the homes of Protestants for arms, increasing sectarian tensions. The raids were not necessarily targeting Protestants but unionists as Fearghal McGarry writes "the raids were also motivated by sectarian tensions and the Volunteers’ resentment of Protestant support for the authorities: ‘They gave information concerning the IRA to Crown forces and maintained a most hostile attitude to everything republican.’" The raids were immensely unpopular even amongst the volunteers and "Local Protestants, many of them isolated in rural nationalist areas, were outraged....In contrast, one Protestant, whose ‘dog was very friendly with the raiders’ received a polite apology for the disturbance, while another paid ‘tribute to the pleasant way that the raiders visited him. They came and parted on the happiest terms.’" Armed Orangemen began parading the roads of Unionist areas and tit-for-tat killings occurred in reprisal for IRA casualties incurred during raids. He supported the Belfast Boycott and his brigade began harassing of Protestant stores, burning delivery vans from Belfast, raiding trains carrying northern goods and sabotaging rail tracks.

O'Duffy became more ruthless in 1921, intensifying attacks on British forces and executions of suspected informers and other opponents of the IRA. When a Protestant trader named George Lester held up and searched two boys he suspected of being dispatch carriers for the IRA in February 1921, O'Duffy ordered his death. Lester was shot but survived his injury. In retaliation, the B Specials invaded Rosslea on 23 February and sacked the Catholic part of the town. One month later the IRA, commanded by O'Duffy, raided the town in reprisal, burning fourteen houses and killing three Protestants, two of them B Specials.

In March 1921, he was made commander of the IRA's 2nd Northern Division but was unpopular with the ordinary Volunteers due to his "...high handed attitude, self-promotion, frequent complaints of local incompetence and general lack of camaraderie." .

On 5 April 1921 O'Duffy ordered that all armed patrols were to be attacked. IRA units across Tyrone carried out attacks to include Carrickmore (two Constables were severely wounded), Mountfield (a six-hour attack of the barracks), Pomeroy, Coalisland and Dromore (which led to reprisals). The RIC suffered a total of 10 members wounded in that nights operations. In April and May 1921 three raids on barracks and 13 ambushes were reported. Charlie Daly took command of the 2nd Northern Division in May 1921. Following the Truce with the British in July 1921, he was sent to Belfast. After the rioting known as Belfast's Bloody Sunday, he was given the task of liaising with the British to try to maintain the Truce and defend Catholic areas against attack. During this time he gained the nickname "Give 'em the lead" after delivering a belligerent speech in South Armagh threatening that if unionists "decided they were against Ireland and against their fellow countrymen" the IRA would "have to use the lead against them". He was Director of Organisation in Ulster and Chief Liaison officer for Ulster at the time the treaty was signed.

See The Troubles in Ulster (1920–1922)

He became director of the army in 1921. In May 1921 he was returned as a Sinn Féin TD for the Monaghan constituency to the Second Dáil. He was re-elected at the 1922 general election.

In January 1922 he became IRA Chief of Staff, replacing Richard Mulcahy. O'Duffy was the youngest general in Europe until Spanish general Francisco Franco was promoted to that rank.

=== Civil War General and Garda Síochána ===
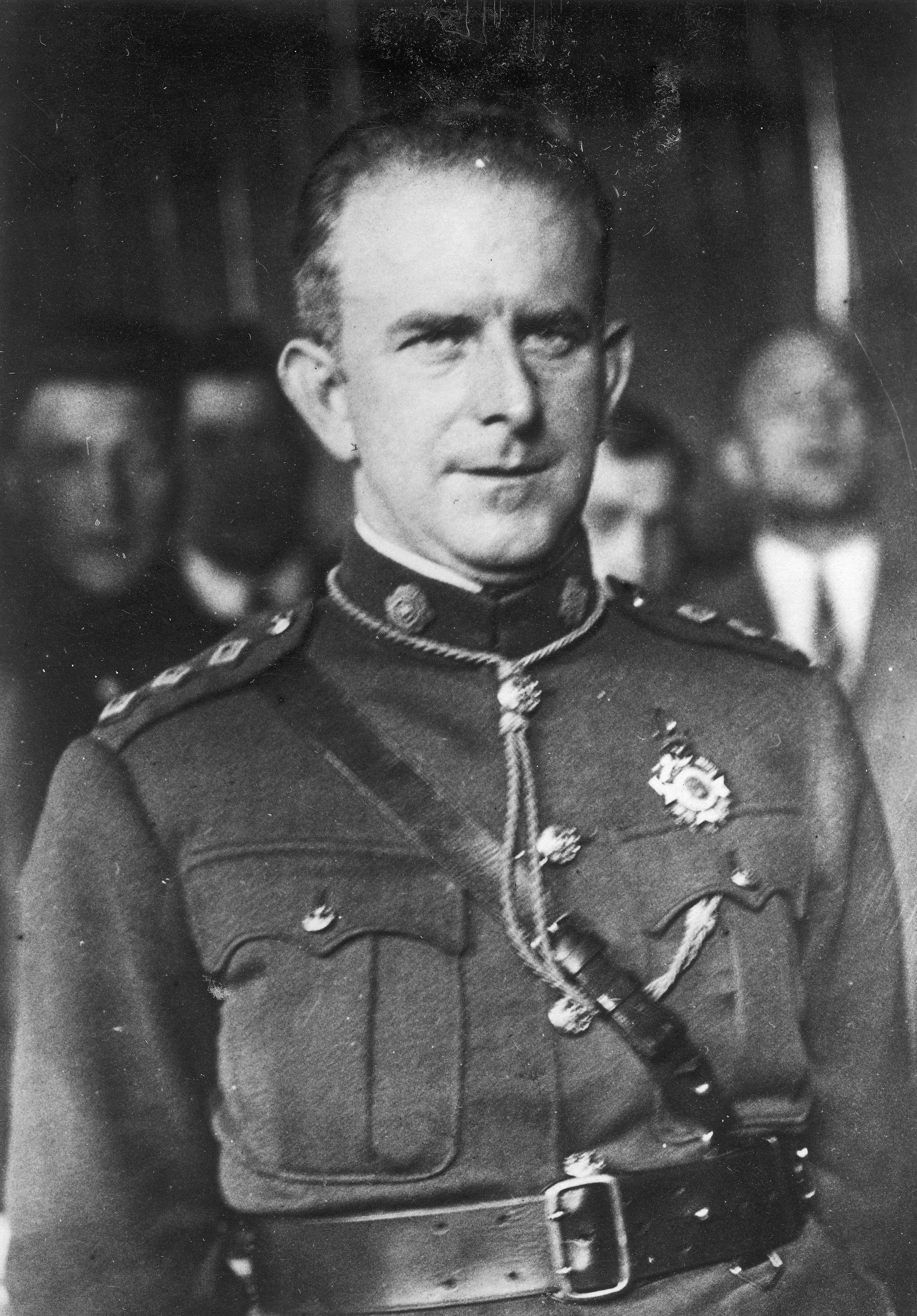
O'Duffy in his uniform as Garda Commissioner, c. 1922–33

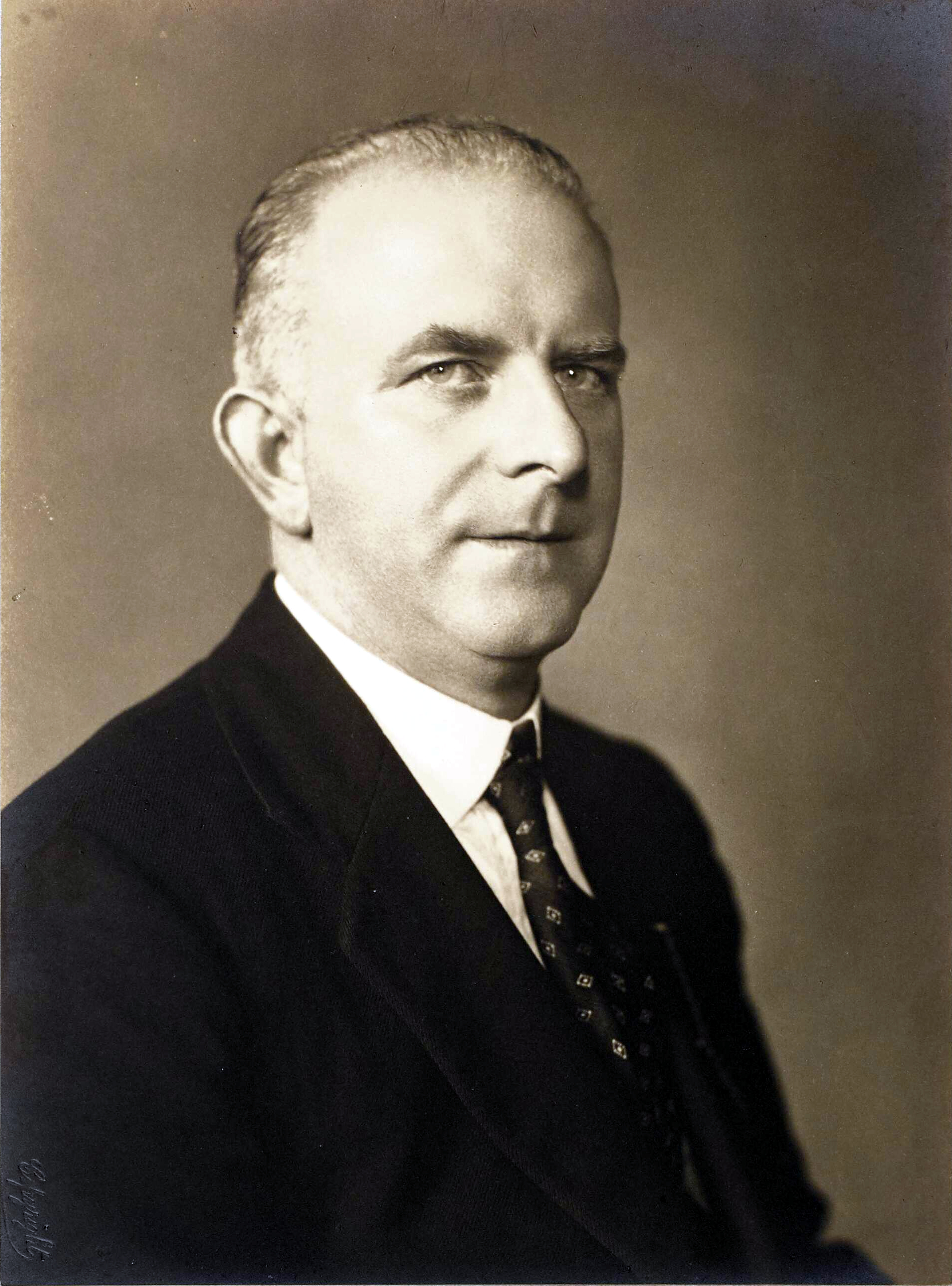
O'Duffy, circa 1930

In 1921 he supported the Anglo-Irish Treaty, being pessimistic about the IRA's chances should the war resume and seeing the treaty as a stepping stone to a republic. Frank Aiken, a future military and political opponent, stated that from the signing of the treaty to the attack on the Four Courts in June 1922, O'Duffy did Herculean work for the pro-treaty cause. Further, Aiken felt that without those endeavours, aided by Mulcahy and Eoin MacNeill, the Civil War would not have taken place.

On 14 January, Dan Hogan was arrested in Derry by the B Specials. In response, O'Duffy proposed the kidnapping of a hundred prominent Orangemen in Fermanagh and Tyrone to Collins. The raid was executed on 7 February. On 22 April, O'Duffy accused Liam Lynch's 1st Southern Division of retaining arms intended for the Northern IRA. Lynch in turn blamed O'Duffy for the arms not reaching the north.

He served as a general in the National Army and was given control of the South-Western Command. In the ensuing Irish Civil War he was one of the architects behind the Free State's strategy of seaborne landings in Republican-held areas. He took Limerick for the Free State in July 1922, before being held up in the Battle of Killmallock south of the city. The enmities of the Civil War era were to stay with O'Duffy throughout his political career.

In September 1922, Minister for Home Affairs Kevin O'Higgins was experiencing indiscipline within the recently formed Garda Síochána and O'Duffy was appointed Garda Commissioner after resigning from the army to take up the position. O'Duffy was a fine organiser and has been given much of the credit for the emergence of a largely respected, non-political and unarmed police force. He insisted on a Catholic ethos to distinguish the Gardaí from their Royal Irish Constabulary (RIC) predecessors, and regularly told members of the force they were not just men working an ordinary job, but policemen fulfilling their religious duty. He was also a vocal opponent of alcohol in the force, instructing Gardaí to avoid it in his first public address as Garda Commissioner. He encouraged Garda members to join the Pioneer Total Abstinence Association of the Sacred Heart. Although Garda were not allowed to wear pins on their uniform, O'Duffy made an exception for the Pioneer pin. In 1924 during the Irish Army Mutiny he was appointed as General Officer Commanding of the Irish Army, holding both roles until 1925.

In February, following a general election in 1933, Executive Council President Éamon de Valera dismissed O'Duffy as Garda Commissioner. In the Dáil de Valera explained the reason for his dismissal, stating "[O'Duffy] was likely to be biased in his attitude because of past political affiliations". The true reason, however, appears to have been the new government's discovery that shortly after the 1932 election, O'Duffy was one of the voices urging the Cumann na nGaedheal government of W. T. Cosgrave to resort to a military coup rather than to turn over power to the incoming Fianna Fáil administration. O'Duffy refused the offer of another position of equivalent rank in the public service. Ernest Blythe said many years later that Cosgrave had become so alarmed by O'Duffy's conduct that had he returned to power he would have also sacked O'Duffy as De Valera had done. However O'Duffy's dismissal was criticised in the Dáil at the time by Cumann na nGaedheal politicians.

=== Leader of the Blueshirts ===
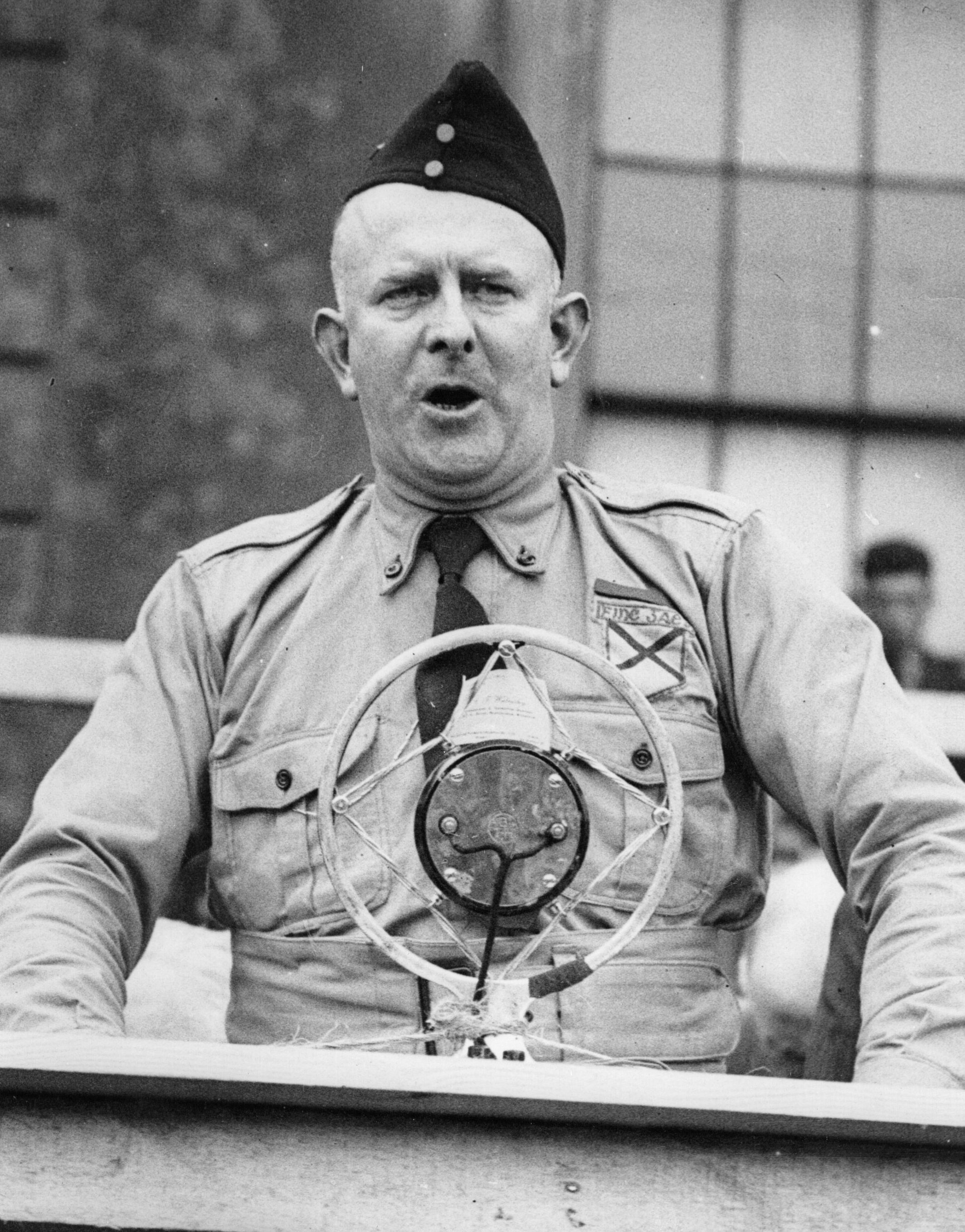
O'Duffy speaking at a rally in September 1934

In July 1933 O'Duffy, urged by Blythe and Thomas F. O'Higgins, became leader of the Army Comrades Association, an organisation set up to protect Cumann na nGaedheal public meetings, which had been disrupted under the slogan "No Free Speech for Traitors" by Irish Republican Army members newly confident after the elections. O'Duffy and many other conservative elements within the Irish Free State began to embrace fascist ideology, which was in vogue at that time and O'Duffy was seen to be an ideal choice to lead the Blueshirts as he was considered charismatic, skilled in organising and also untainted by association with the failures of the previous Cumann na nGaedheal government.

O'Duffy was approved as leader of the ACA on 20 July. He soon changed the name of this new movement to the National Guard. An admirer of the Italian leader Benito Mussolini, O'Duffy and his organisation adopted outward symbols of European fascism such as the straight-arm Roman salute and a distinctive blue uniform. It was not long before they became known as the Blueshirts, similar to the Italian Blackshirts and the German Brownshirts. O'Duffy established a weekly newspaper, the Blueshirt, and published a new constitution that promoted corporatism, Irish unification and opposition to "alien" control and influence.

In July 1933, O'Duffy announced plans for a parade by the Blueshirts in Dublin to commemorate Michael Collins, Arthur Griffith, and Kevin O'Higgins. An annual march to Leinster Lawn to commemorate the three pro-Treaty nationalists had been held until Fianna Fáil came to power in 1932. De Valera feared a similar coup d'état as seen in Italy and the Special Branch raided the houses of prominent people aligned with Cumann na nGaedheal to seize their firearms. On 11 August, de Valera reinstated the Constitution (Amendment No. 17) Act 1931, banned the parade and placed Gardaí outside of key locations. 48 hours before the planned march, 200 men were recruited into an auxiliary special branch of the police soon nicknamed the Broy Harriers.

On 22 August the Blueshirts were declared an illegal organisation. To circumvent this ban the movement once again adopted a new name, this time styling itself the League of Youth. In 1933 a group of Irish republicans, one member of which was Dan Keating, planned to assassinate O'Duffy in Ballyseedy, County Kerry, while he would be on his way to a meeting. A man was sent to Limerick to find out which car O'Duffy would be travelling in but the man purposely gave false information and O'Duffy escaped.

During the early stages of the Second Italo-Ethiopian War in 1935, O'Duffy offered Benito Mussolini the service of 1000 Blueshirts because he believed the war represented the struggle between civilisation and barbarism. On 18 September, in an interview he said that the Blueshirts were volunteering to fight "not for Italy or against Abyssinia, but for the principle of the corporate system" against which "the forces of both Marxism and of capitalism" were ranged.

O'Duffy and some of his men also made an appearance at the 1934 International Fascist conference in Montreux where he argued against antisemitism, telling the conference that they had "no Jewish problem in Ireland" and that he "could not subscribe to the principle of the persecution of any race". Upon his return to Ireland, he indicated his preference for Italian fascism over German Nazism, stating: "the Nazi policy is not compatible with the corporative system."

=== Fine Gael ===
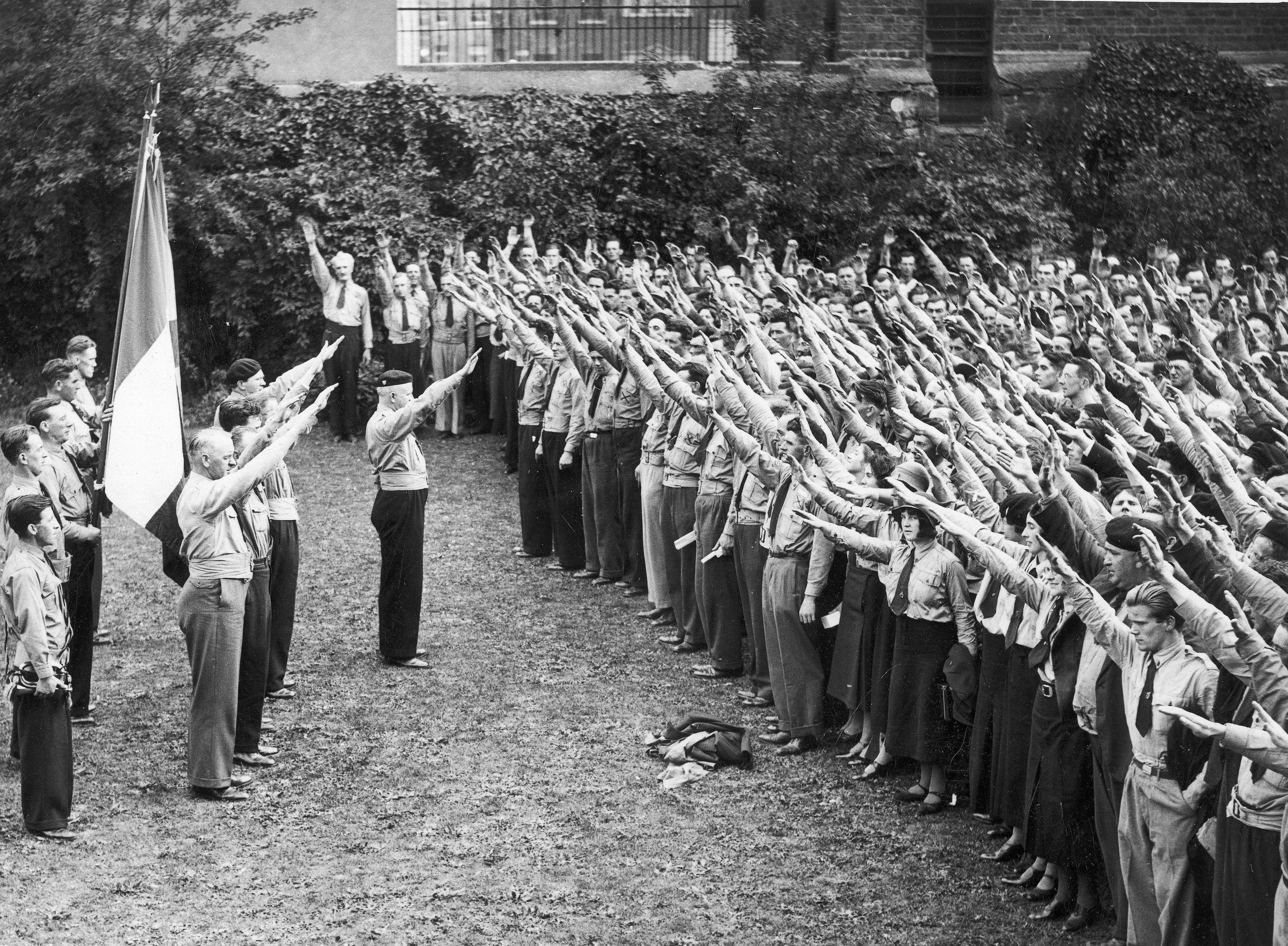
O'Duffy leading a salute with the Blueshirts, December 1934

On 24 August 1933, representatives of Cumann na nGaedheal and the National Centre Party approached O'Duffy, offering that the Blueshirts join their ranks in exchange for O'Duffy becoming their leader. On 8 September the Blueshirts, under pressure after de Valera's ban on the organisation, approved the merger and so Cumann na nGaedheal, the Centre Party and the Blueshirt movement merged to form Fine Gael. O'Duffy, though not a TD, became the first leader, with W. T. Cosgrave serving as vice president and parliamentary leader. The National Guard, now rechristened the Young Ireland Association, was transformed from an illegal paramilitary group into the militant wing of a political party.

The new party's policy document, published in mid-November 1933, sought the reunification of Ireland within the British Commonwealth but made no mention of a corporatist parliament and committed itself to democracy. As a result, O'Duffy was forced to tone down his anti-democratic rhetoric though many of his Blueshirt colleagues continued to advocate authoritarianism.

Fine Gael meetings were often attacked by IRA members and O'Duffy's touring of rural towns resulted in tensions and violence. On 6 October 1933 O'Duffy was involved in disturbances in Tralee during which he was hit with a hammer on the head and had his car torched as he attempted to attend a Fine Gael convention. De Valera used the violence to justify a crackdown on Blueshirt activities. A raid on the Young Ireland Association found evidence that it was the National Guard under another name, and the organisation was once again banned. O'Duffy responded with a speech in Ballyshannon where referred to himself as a republican and declared that "whenever Mr de Valera runs away from the Republic and arrests you Republicans, and puts you on board beds in Mountjoy, he is entitled to the fate he gave Mick Collins and Kevin O’Higgins". O'Duffy was arrested by the Gardaí several days later. He was initially released on appeal but was summoned to appear before the Military Tribunal two days later and charged with membership of an illegal organisation and incitement to murder the president of the executive council, however, they were unable to convict him of either charge.

O'Duffy proved an unsuitable leader: he was a soldier rather than a politician and was temperamental. He resented Cumann na nGaedheal's drift from republicanism following Collins' death in 1922, and insisted that Fine Gael would not "play second fiddle to anybody in the matter of Nationality". O'Duffy's nationalistic views alienated ex-Unionists who had supported Cumann na nGaedheal since the civil war, alarmed pro-Commonwealth moderates in Fine Gael, and resulted in O'Duffy being made the subject of an exclusion order in Northern Ireland. O'Duffy also clashed with his party on economic matters. Whereas Fine Gael favoured a return to pasture farming and free trade, O'Duffy was supportive of the experiments in tillage and protectionism implemented by his Fianna Fáil rivals, and was forced to attempt to compromise between the two.

His Fine Gael colleagues who regarded themselves as defenders of law-and-order were embarrassed by the Blueshirts' use of violence and attacks on the Gardaí, in addition to O'Duffy's connections with foreign fascist organisations and his view of the IRA as a communist group. O'Duffy's prestige was damaged when Fine Gael only won majorities on six councils to Fianna Fáil's fifteen in the 1934 Irish local elections after O'Duffy had predicted taking twenty. The cost of Blueshirt activism also began to strain the party financially. O'Duffy's approval of illegal agitation against the collection of land annuities by the government, declaration of his support for a republic and the revelation of his connections with the British Union of Fascists and the Fedrelandslaget were the last straws for moderates in Fine Gael. On 5 and 7 September 1934 Cosgrave, Ned Cronin and James Dillon met O'Duffy resulting in an agreement that O'Duffy could "deliver only carefully prepared and concise speeches from manuscripts" and give interviews "only after consultation and in writing". In response, O'Duffy resigned from the party on 18 September.

After his resignation, O'Duffy denounced Fine Gael as "the pan-British party of the Free State" and claimed he resigned "because he was not prepared to lead the League of Youth with the Union Jack tied to his neck".

=== Spanish Civil War ===
At first, O'Duffy announced to the press that "he was glad to be out of politics", but in October 1934 he announced his intentions to lead the Blueshirts as an independent movement. The Blueshirts split into two factions, one supporting O'Duffy and the other supporting Ned Cronin's leadership. O'Duffy and Cronin toured the country attempting to win the support of local Blueshirt branches. By 1935, the Blueshirts had disintegrated. Seeking to regain his former political influence, O'Duffy attempted to court the IRA, encouraging his followers to wear Easter lilies and desist from informing on republicans. In June 1935, O'Duffy launched the National Corporate Party, a fascist political party inspired by Italy's Mussolini.

The following year, he organised an Irish Brigade to fight for the Nationalists in the Spanish Civil War. He was motivated to do so by Ireland's historic link with Spain, his devout anti-communism and a will to defend Catholicism, stating "It is not a conflict between fascism and anti-fascism but between Christ and antichrist". In London in September 1936, O'Duffy met Juan de la Cierva and Emilio Mola, promising he would recruit an Irish contingent to fight against the Republicans.

Despite the Irish Government advising against participation in the war, 700 of O'Duffy's followers went to Spain to fight on the Nationalist side. He later stated he had received over 7,000 applications but several complications meant only 700 of these made it to Spain. O'Duffy's men saw little fighting and were sent home by Nationalist leader Francisco Franco, returning in June 1937. Franco had not been impressed by the Brigade's lack of military expertise and there were bitter arguments among O'Duffy and his officers about the direction of the Brigade.

== Later life and death ==
O'Duffy returned to Ireland from Spain in disarray. He wrote a book, Crusade in Spain (1938), about the Irish Brigade in Spain. The book had antisemitic undertones; O'Duffy wrote that trade unions are "powerful political Jewish-Masonic organisations, directed and focused by the Communist International." He later congratulated General Franco for winning the Spanish Civil War; Franco thanked O'Duffy for his sending congratulations "on the victory of the Spanish Army in defence of Christianity, occidental civilisation and humanity, over the forces of destruction and disorder."

In 1936 O'Duffy attended the founding meeting of Cumann Poblachta na hÉireann but never became a member. In 1940 he also attended the founding meeting of Córas na Poblachta along with former leaders of the Irish Christian Front. In 1939 The Irish Times reported that O'Duffy and his followers were trying to set up a new organisation however nothing materialised. He was subsequently put under surveillance by the G2.

In February 1939 he met up with Oskar Pfaus, a German spy whom he put in touch with the IRA. He also met the Italian diplomat Vincenzo Berardis. Berardis assessed O'Duffy as being a committed fascist and noted his approval of the S-Plan and his opposition to de Valera's coercion against the IRA. A month later O'Duffy met Berardis again to solicit his support for a new fascist party that would unite Irish fascists and republicans. He is thought to have met with several leading IRA figures and German diplomat Eduard Hempel in a remote corner of County Donegal during the summer of 1939. G2 suspected O'Duffy was "flirting with the IRA" by acting as a negotiator between them and the Germans. At one point O'Duffy was offered a position as an IRA intelligence officer and on another occasion, he was invited to join former IRA Chiefs of Staff Moss Twomey and Andy Cooney in a protest against the "Yankee invasion of the Six Counties" in the summer of 1941.

In early November 1940, O'Duffy spoke with German spy Hermann Goertz in a meeting arranged by Seamus O'Donovan. O'Duffy made a good impression on Goertz and put him in contact with General Hugo MacNeill, who met with O'Duffy and German diplomat Henning Thomsen the next month to draw up a bilateral understanding between the Irish army and Germany in the event of a British invasion of Ireland.

In February–March 1943, transmissions were sent using Goertz's code to the Abwehr in Berlin, purportedly from an associate of O'Duffy which offered to raise a 'Green Division' of volunteers to fight alongside the Wehrmacht on the Eastern Front to "fight against Bolshevism". The telegram was sent by Joseph Andrews, a man unconnected to O'Duffy, who had been attempting to extract money from the Germans. He was arrested in Dublin in December 1943. O'Duffy was unaware of the proposal made in his name by Andrews.

By this time O'Duffy had developed a serious drinking problem and his health had begun to seriously deteriorate; he died on 30 November 1944, aged 54. He received a state funeral. Following Requiem Mass in St Mary's Pro-Cathedral, he was buried in Glasnevin Cemetery.

In 2006 RTÉ aired a documentary entitled Eoin O'Duffy – An Irish Fascist.

== Gallery ==
British Army intelligence file for Owen O'Duffy (Eoin O'Duffy)

Military offices
New office	Chief of Staff of the Defence Forces; February–July 1922	Succeeded by Richard Mulcahy

Dáil	Election	Deputy (Party)	Deputy (Party)	Deputy (Party)
2nd	1921	Seán MacEntee (SF)	Eoin O'Duffy (SF)	Ernest Blythe (SF)
3rd	1922	Patrick MacCarvill (AT-SF)	Eoin O'Duffy (PT-SF)	Ernest Blythe (PT-SF)
4th	1923	Patrick MacCarvill (Rep)	Patrick Duffy (CnaG)	Ernest Blythe (CnaG)
5th	1927 (Jun)	Patrick MacCarvill (FF)	Alexander Haslett (Ind.)	Ernest Blythe (CnaG)
6th	1927 (Sep)	Conn Ward (FF)	Alexander Haslett (Ind.)	Ernest Blythe (CnaG)
7th	1932	Conn Ward (FF)	Eamon Rice (FF)	Ernest Blythe (CnaG)
8th	1933	Conn Ward (FF)	Eamon Rice (FF)	Alexander Haslett (Ind.)
9th	1937	Conn Ward (FF)	Eamon Rice (FF)	James Dillon (FG)
10th	1938	Conn Ward (FF)	Bridget Rice (FF)	James Dillon (FG)
11th	1943	Conn Ward (FF)	Bridget Rice (FF)	James Dillon (Ind.)
12th	1944	Conn Ward (FF)	Bridget Rice (FF)	James Dillon (Ind.)
13th	1948	Patrick Maguire (FF)	Bridget Rice (FF)	James Dillon (Ind.)
14th	1951	Patrick Maguire (FF)	Bridget Rice (FF)	James Dillon (Ind.)
15th	1954	Patrick Mooney (FF)	Edward Kelly (FF)	James Dillon (FG)
16th	1957	Patrick Mooney (FF)	Eighneachán Ó hAnnluain (SF)	James Dillon (FG)
17th	1961	Patrick Mooney (FF)	Erskine H. Childers (FF)	James Dillon (FG)
18th	1965	Patrick Mooney (FF)	Erskine H. Childers (FF)	James Dillon (FG)
19th	1969	Billy Fox (FG)	Erskine H. Childers (FF)	John Conlan (FG)
20th	1973	Jimmy Leonard (FF)	Erskine H. Childers (FF)	John Conlan (FG)
20th	1973 by-election	Jimmy Leonard (FF)	Brendan Toal (FG)	John Conlan (FG)
21st	1977	Constituency abolished. See Cavan–Monaghan		
