= Edward Cronin =

Edward Cronin may refer to:

- Edward Cronin (homeopath), pioneer of homeopathy and a founder of the Plymouth Brethren movement
- Edward J. Cronin, Massachusetts lawyer and politician
- Edward Cronin (musician), Irish American fiddler
- Ned Cronin (Edward J. Cronin), Irish army officer and leader of the Blueshirts
