= Agriculture in Ireland =

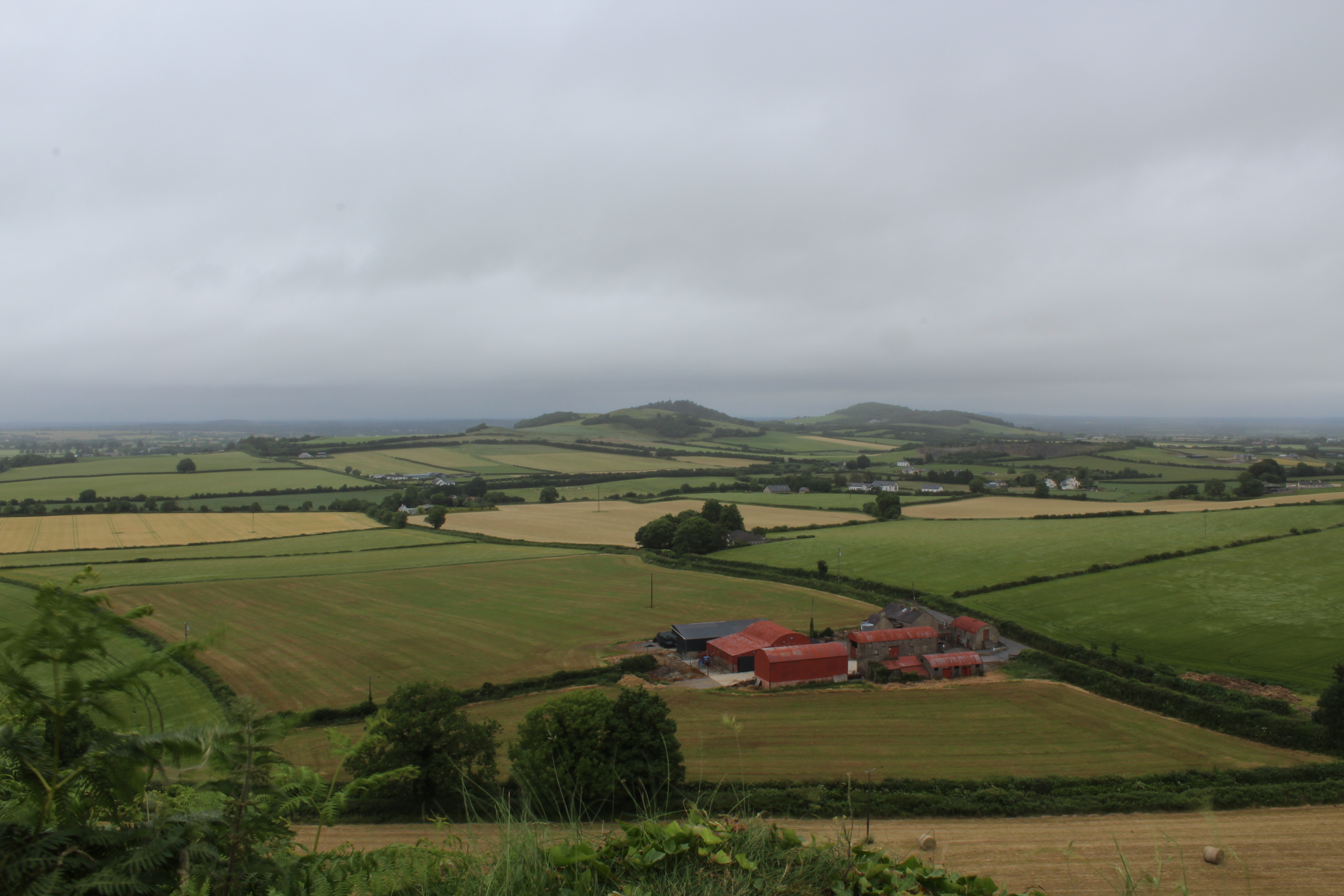
Crop fields and a farm in County Laois

Agriculture in Ireland began during the neolithic era, when inhabitants of the island began to practice animal husbandry and farming grains. Principal crops grown during the neolithic era included barley and wheat.

Following the Acts of Union 1800, the majority of rural Irish workers participated in the agricultural sector of Ireland's economy.

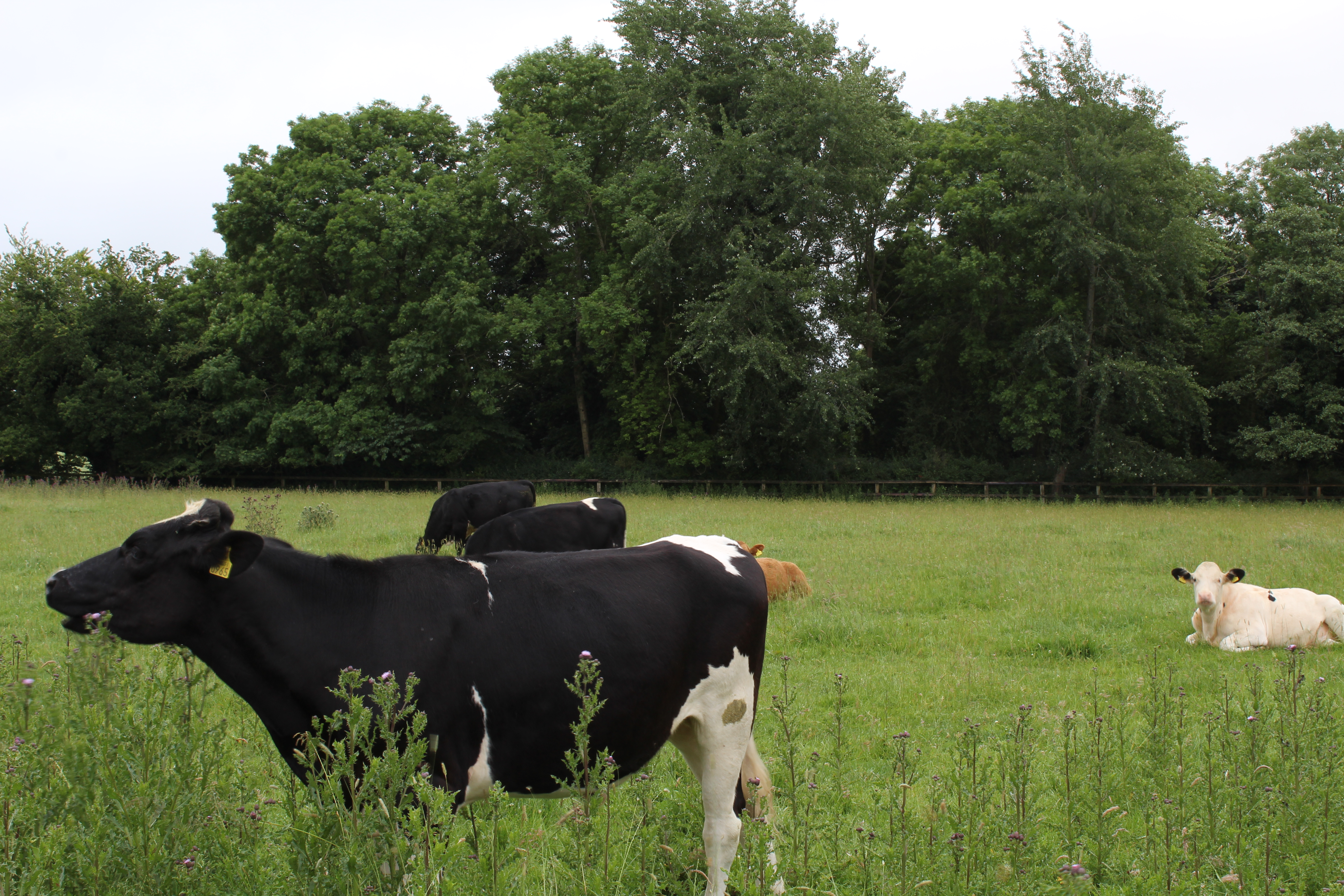
Cows in County Kildare, Ireland

== History ==
=== Prehistory and early history ===
Since the Ice age the underlying geology of the island of Ireland has led to the formation of base rich soils, which combined with the temperate maritime climate has meant the island has been a place well-suited to the cultivation of grass and the rearing of cattle. The soils in Ireland are active biologically and are typically moderately leached.

During the Ireland's Neolithic era, which lasted from around 4000 B.C. until 2500 B.C., Ireland saw its first instances of animal husbandry and the farming of grains. The era saw the introduction of cattle and sheep as domesticated animals into Ireland and saw the start of dairy production in Ireland. Large herbivorous mammals such as the European elk and the aurochs were not naturally present on the island at that time, showcasing the importance of managing cattle as a food source.

The principle crops during the Neolithic era in Ireland were species of barley and wheat.

=== Medieval history ===
During the medieval era in Ireland, recognized as the period from 400 AD to 1150 AD, many facts and figures are still unknown or vague to modern discovery and understanding. Evidence from archaeological sites concludes that hulled barley and oats were the primary crops cultivated at this time. Other crops, such as wheat, flax, peas, and beans, have been discovered at these archaeological sites as well; however, only occasionally, suggesting their subordinate position in medieval agriculture production. Furthermore, towards the later half of the medieval period, studies have proved an increase in crop variety being discovered in more site locations, suggesting an overall increase in arable tillage throughout Ireland.

=== Early modern history ===
In the years following the Acts of Union 1800, the majority of the Irish rural laborers participated in agriculture. Most rural laborers did not sustain themselves based solely upon their wages, but also had to cultivate a small plot of land to sustain themselves. Irishmen ordinarily rented this land from landlords in exchange for their labor, rather than paying for rent with money. Much of the land was rented as a conacre, an arrangement in which farmers were granted the right to farm a plot of land but did not create a landlord-renter contract, though this practice was more common in Connacht and Munster than in Leinster and Ulster.

=== Great Famine ===
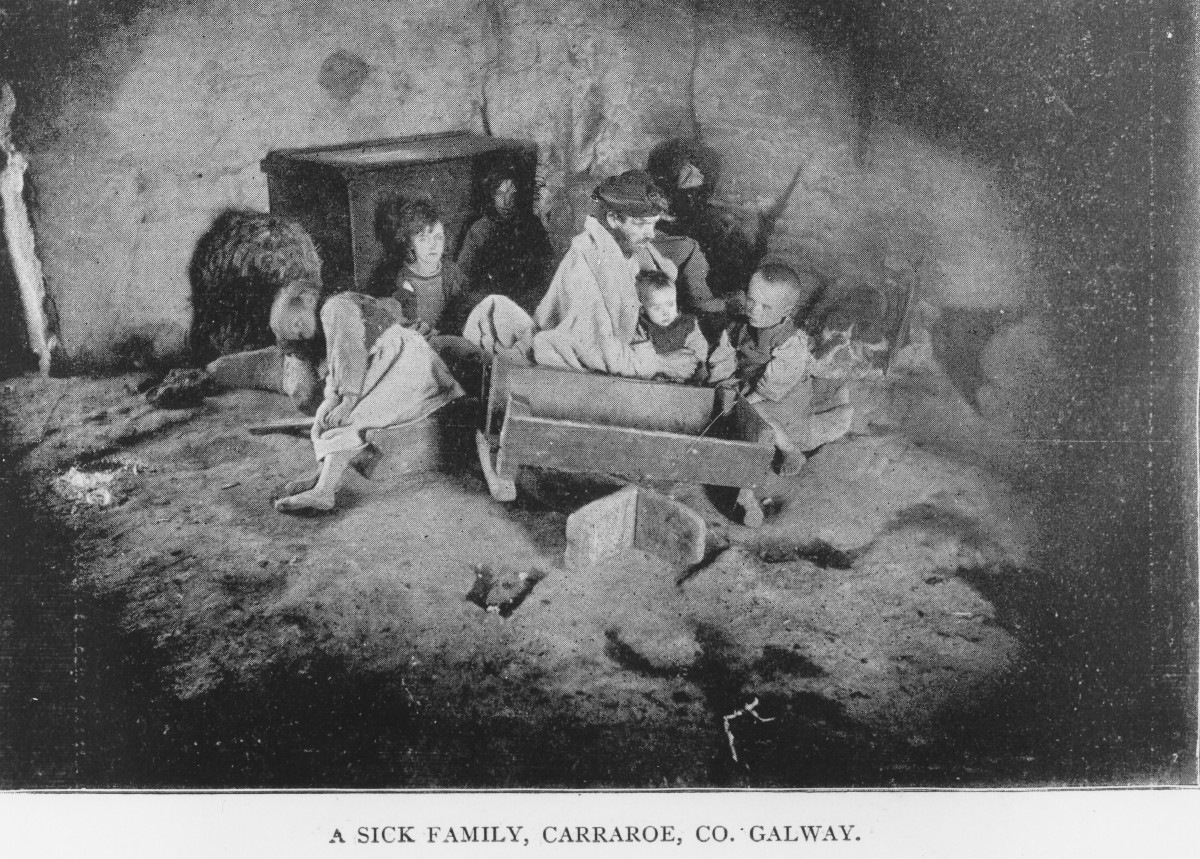
A starving Irish family from Carraroe, County Galway, during the Great Famine in Ireland

From 1821 to 1841 the agricultural labour force grew by half, the cost would have to have been met by a difficult to achieve 1% annual growth in production. In 1845, potatoes accounted for a little under a third of tilled acreage in Ireland, with it being the food source that three million people were exclusively dependent on. In the 1830s and the beginning of the 1840s, a large part of livestock numbers were exported and also up to one quarter of grain that was produced.

From 1840 to 1845 the labour force involved in agriculture was 1.6 million people. The Great Famine caused the death of an estimated 1 million people. Potato acreage, over 2 million acres in 1845, reduced more than half to a little over 1 million acres in 1846, to 0.3 million in 1847 and back up to 0.7 million acres in the year 1848.

In 1854 total agricultural output in Ireland had a value of £47.4 million. In the decades following the famine, the majority of merchandise exports were still due to agriculture, farming accounted for a third of national output and over half the working population were employed in the occupation.

=== Post-famine ===
Throughout the twentieth century, agricultural land in Ireland increasingly shifted away from use as arable land and increasingly towards use as pasture.

Following on from the first inter-country ploughing championship held in 1931 in Athy, Kildare, a popular yearly event in Ireland is the National Ploughing Championships; in 2018 it drew 281,000 visitors over three days.

The liberation of the Irish Free State from the United Kingdom of Great Britain and Ireland brought about differences in agricultural development throughout all Ireland. In 1926, a few years after the conclusion of the Irish Civil War, the majority of the Free State's employment was generated from the agriculture industry, while about one-quarter of the employment of Northern Ireland was in the agricultural sector. After the 1932 Irish general election resulted in a Fianna Fáil government, the Free State adopted significant protectionist policies ordered towards ensuring agricultural self-sufficiency.

The protectionist policies ordered by Fianna Fáil had substantial effects on the agricultural sector in Ireland. With respect to international trade, the U.K. retaliated against newly-adopted Irish agricultural and land policies with tariffs against certain Irish agricultural products, including cattle; agricultural exports from the Free State to the United Kingdom were cut in half during the first half of the 1930s. The policies also distorted the domestic market for several agricultural goods, especially wheat, which by 1936 had a domestic price of over double the that of the commodity on the global market.

== Types of farming ==
=== Dairy farming ===
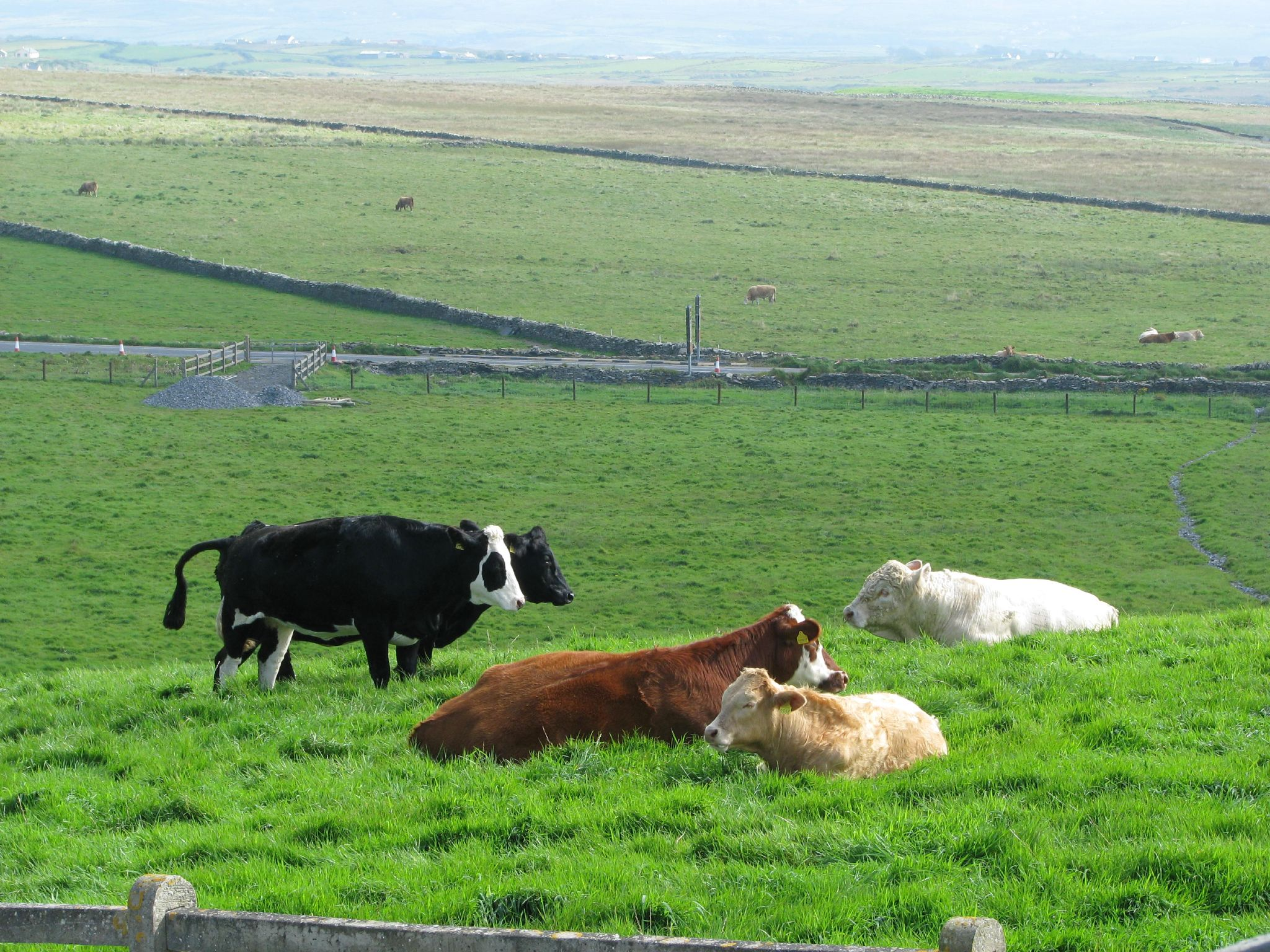
Irish cattle

Dairy farming, or dairying, is Ireland's most profitable branch of agriculture, with over 18,000 dairy farmers harvesting around 1.55 million dairy cows. The large scale on which Ireland's dairy farming operates is a possibility due to Ireland's temperate maritime climate. Such a climate provides farmers with a large window to grow the substantial amounts of grass necessary to supply the immense cow population in a cost-efficient manner. Furthermore, the grass-based food source naturally available to the population of cows creates a sustainable production process aiding in the production of over 5.4 billion liters of milk annually. The grass-based food source, in part harvested from the thousands of acres of fields covering Ireland, can be attributed to the high quality and nutritious dairy products produced.

=== Beef farming ===
Ireland has an extensive history of farming beef, dating back thousands of years. Currently, cattle farming remains one of Ireland's most prominent sectors, with over 6.5 million cows on Irish farms, accounting for over 25 percent of agriculture output. Ireland's national breeding herd comprises 1.5 million dairy cows and 889,000 suckler cows, making Ireland's suckler cow herd the third largest in the world, following France and Spain. Furthermore, Ireland is noticed as a significant competitor in beef exports on the world stage, accounting for about 1.6 billion euros in exports yearly. Ireland exports the majority of their beef to the European Union, while the United Kingdom can be recognized as its largest consumer.

=== Tillage farming ===
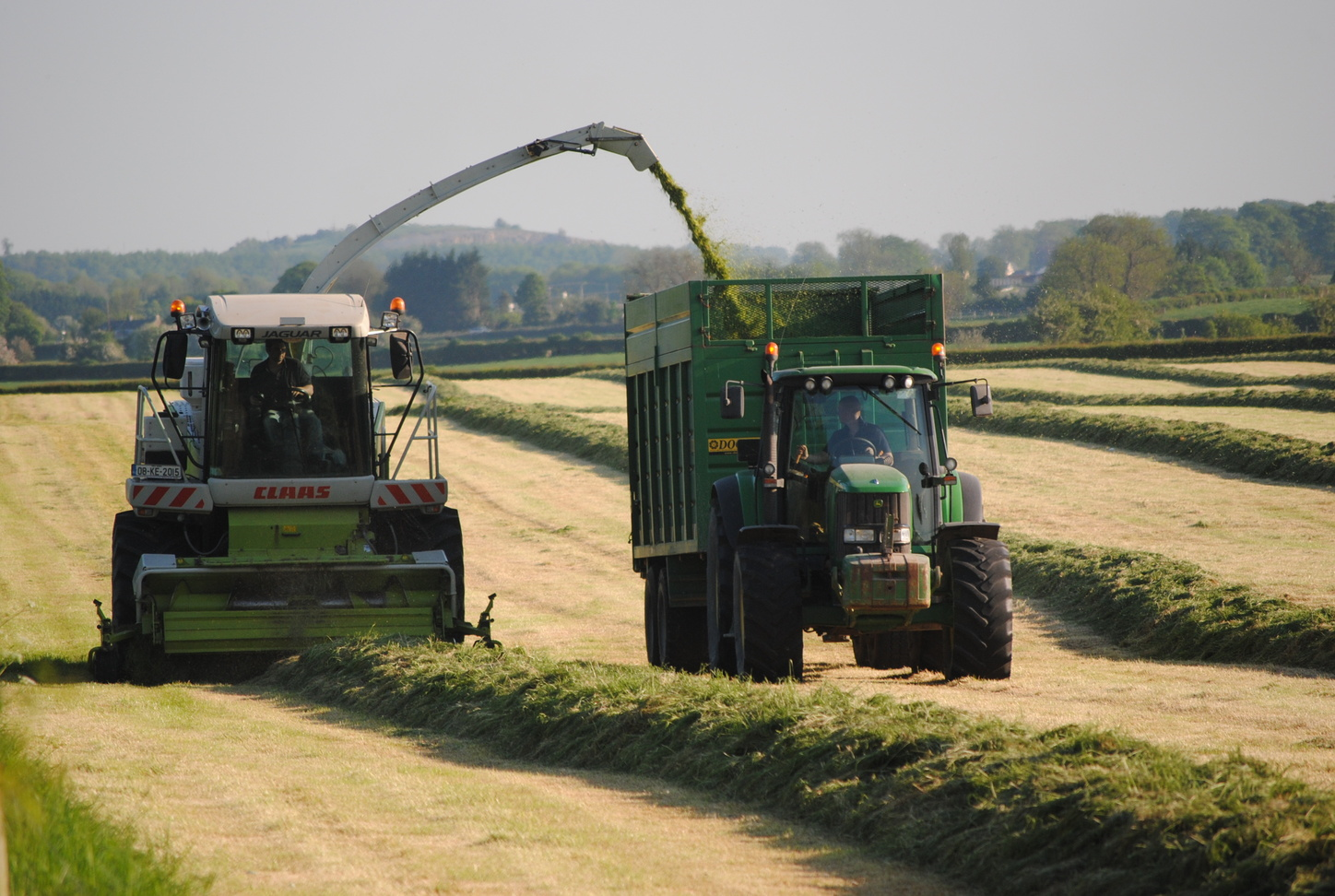
Silage harvesting in Clonard, County Meath

Tillage farming, the soil preparation for planting and cultivating the earth after planting, is another important sector in Ireland's agriculture. Ireland mainly takes part in the production of mono-crops such as wheat, barley, oats, and potatoes. Furthermore, potatoes remain a significant item in the Irish diet. However, Ireland imports significantly more potatoes than it exports. Irish farmers have exited the sugar farming market despite the 150 million euros previously produced annually due to global competition and labor costs related to sugar production. Ireland also hosts one of the world's highest potential for crop yield, presenting approximately 300,000 hectares of land solely dedicated to tillage farming. Ireland's vast farming land has allowed for the opportunity for farmers to break into the emerging organic tillage market as organic grains are becoming increasingly more in demand throughout the world.

== Regulation ==
The agricultural industry in Ireland is under the responsibility of the Department of Agriculture, Food and the Marine (An Roinn Talmhaíochta, Bia agus Mara). Bord Bia is responsible for promoting the food and horticultural products of the industry, and Teagasc has a role in research and providing information to farmers. Dairy farmers are held to high standards making the quality of dairy products a significant factor in the operation of such businesses. Dairy farmers in Ireland are supervised by and regularly undergo inspections, product sampling, and audits through the Dairy Controls and Certification Division to ensure that specific standards are fulfilled.

== Trade ==
=== Imports ===
In 2020, Ireland's imports of agri-food products totalled $10.626 billion. Despite Ireland's prominent agriculture productions, Ireland imports around 80 percent of its animal feed, food, beverages, and other agri-food products. While agri-food products are mainly provided by the United Kingdom, Ireland imports goods from several other countries, such as France, Netherlands, and Italy.

=== Exports ===
In 2021, exports from Ireland of food, drink and horticulture (agri-food) had a value of €13.5 billion, with international markets outside of the European Union and United Kingdom accounting for 34% of exports, and the European Union itself being the largest export destination at €4.5 billion value. International markets outside of the EU and UK accounted for 34% of Ireland's exports, €5 billion of which were from the dairy industry, with €3.5 billion from meat and livestock; of those beef exports constituted €2.1 billion, pork €542 million, sheep-meat €420 million and primary poultry at €128 million .

== Agriculture today ==
Agriculture in Ireland is a major component of the modern economy of the Republic of Ireland. A major livestock producer, Ireland has very limited horticultural and grain production on account of its topography and climate. Ireland manufactures many derivatives and value-added products from its livestock base. However, much of its beef and dairy products are exported. Ireland imports around 80 percent of its animal feed, food, and beverage needs. Ireland receives a considerable proportion of its agricultural commodity and grocery product needs from the United Kingdom, although this declined by 25 percent in the first half of 2021 on account of additional customs and logistical complexities following the U.K.'s departure from the European Union. Ireland also imports from such E.U. countries as the Netherlands (beer, cut flowers), France (beer, wine), and Italy (wine, non-alcoholic beverages). Major third country trading partners are Chile (wine, apples), Argentina (wine, animal feed), and New Zealand (wine, bovine semen). Ireland is a key destination for U.S. animal feed ingredient exports. However, the United States is currently [when?] not a major direct supplier of food and beverage products. Ireland generally receives many U.S. products, including wine, fresh and dried fruit, and confectionery via the U.K., but some products may route to Ireland via France or the Netherlands, or be shipped directly from the United States post-Brexit.

As of 2018, the Central Intelligence Agency estimates that 66.1% of Ireland's land is used for agriculture; 50.7% of Ireland's land is permanent pasture, while 15.4% of its land is arable. Major agricultural products of Ireland include milk, barley, beef, wheat, potatoes, pork, oats, poultry, mushrooms/truffles, and mutton.

According to a September 2020 report by the Irish Department of Agriculture, Food and the Marine, 164,400 Irish citizens are employed in the agricultural industry, comprising 7.1% of Ireland's workforce.

== See also ==
- Agriculture in the United Kingdom
- Common Agricultural Policy
- Teagasc
