= Army Records Society =

The Army Records Society is a text publication society for the history of the British Army. The society was established in 1984 and is a registered charity. To date (February 2026) the society has issued 43 volumes of material.

== Selected publications ==
=== 18th-century volumes ===
- An Eighteenth-Century Secretary at War: The Papers of William, Viscount Barrington (ed. Dr Tony Hayter, 1988) vol. 4 ISBN 978-0-37031227-9
- Colonel Samuel Bagshawe and the Army of King George II, 1731-1762 (ed. Dr Alan J. Guy, 1990) vol. 6 ISBN 978-0-37031501-0
- John Peebles’ American War, 1776-1782 (ed. Professor Ira D. Gruber, 1998) vol. 13 ISBN 978-0-75091791-9
- The Journal of Corporal William Todd, 1745-1762 (eds. Andrew Cormack & Alan Jones, 2001) vol. 18 ISBN 978-0-75092778-9
- Amherst and the Conquest of Canada (ed. Dr Richard Middleton, 2003) vol. 20 ISBN 978-0-75093142-7
- The Duke of Cumberland's Campaigns in Britain and the Low Countries, 1745-1748: A Selection of His Letters (eds. Alastair Massie & Jonathan Oates, 2018) vol. 38 ISBN 978-0-75098887-2

=== 19th-century volumes ===
- The Napoleonic War Journal of Captain Thomas Henry Browne, 1807-1816 (ed. Professor Roger Norman Buckley, 1987) vol. 3 ISBN 978-0-37031121-0
- Roberts in India: The Military Papers of Field Marshal Lord Roberts, 1876-1893 (ed. Brian Robson, 1993) vol. 9 ISBN 978-0-75090401-8
- Lord Chelmsford’s Zululand Campaign, 1878-1879 (ed. Professor John Laband, 1994) vol. 10 ISBN 978-0-75090665-4
- Letters of a Victorian Army Officer: Edward Wellesley, 1840-1854 (ed. Field Marshal Michael Carver, 1995) vol. 11 ISBN 978-0-75091079-8
- The Maratha War Papers of Arthur Wellesley, January to December 1803 (ed. Anthony S. Bennell, 1998) vol. 14 ISBN 978-0-75092069-8
- Sir Hugh Rose and the Central India Campaign, 1858 (ed. Brian Robson, 2000) vol. 16 ISBN 978-0-75092541-9
- At Wellington’s Right Hand: The Letters of Lieutenant-Colonel Sir Alexander Gordon, 1808-1815 (ed. Dr Rory Muir, 2003) vol. 21 ISBN 978-0-75093380-3
- Romaine’s Crimean War: The Letters and Journal of William Govett Romaine 1854-6 (ed. Major Colin Robins OBE, 2005) vol. 24 ISBN 978-0-75094287-4
- Wolseley and Ashanti: The Asante War Journal and Correspondence of Major General Sir Garnet Wolseley 1873-1874 (ed. Professor Ian F. W. Beckett, 2009) vol. 28 ISBN 978-0-75245180-0
- Crimean Cavalry Letters (ed. Glenn Fisher, 2011) vol. 31 ISBN 978-0-75246530-2
- The Military Papers of Field Marshal Sir George White, 1885-1900: Upper Burma, India and South Africa (ed. Stephen M. Miller, 2026) vol. 43 ISBN 978-1-83838773-0

=== 20th-century volumes ===
- The Military Correspondence of Field Marshal Sir Henry Wilson, 1918-1922 (ed. Dr Keith Jeffery, 1985) vol. 1 ISBN 978-0-37030683-4
- The Army and the Curragh Incident, 1914 (ed. Professor Ian F. W. Beckett, 1986) vol. 2 ISBN 978-0-37030738-1
- The Military Correspondence of Field Marshal Sir William Robertson, Chief of the Imperial General Staff, December 1915-February 1918 (ed. Professor David Woodward, 1989) vol. 5 ISBN 978-0-37031415-0
- Montgomery and the Eighth Army: A Selection from the Diaries, Correspondence and other Papers of Field Marshal the Viscount Montgomery of Alamein (ed. Stephen Brooks, 1991) vol. 7 ISBN 978-0-37031723-6
- The British Army and Signals Intelligence during the First World War (ed. Dr John Ferris, 1992) vol. 8 ISBN 978-0-75090247-2
- The Letters of Lieutenant-Colonel Charles à Court Repington CMG, Military Correspondent of The Times, 1903-1918 (ed. Professor A. J. A. Morris, 1999) vol. 15 ISBN 978-0-75092295-1
- Lord Roberts and the War in South Africa, 1899-1902 (ed. Professor André Wessels, 2000) vol. 17 ISBN 978-0-75092555-6
- Rawlinson in India (ed. Dr Mark Jacobsen, 2002) vol. 19 ISBN 978-0-75093141-0
- Allenby in Palestine (ed. Dr Matthew Hughes, 2004) vol. 22 ISBN 978-0-75093841-9
- Lord Kitchener and the War in South Africa, 1899-1902 (ed. Professor André Wessels, 2006) vol. 25 ISBN 978-0-75094557-8
- Major General Oliver Nugent and the Ulster Division, 1915-1918 (ed. Nicholas Perry, 2007) vol. 26 ISBN 978-0-75094880-7
- Montgomery and the Battle of Normandy (ed. Stephen Brooks, 2008) vol. 27 ISBN 978-0-75095123-4
- The First World War Letters of General Lord Horne (ed. Dr Simon Robbins, 2009) vol. 29 ISBN 978-0-75245463-4
- The Military Papers of Lieutenant-Colonel Sir Cuthbert Headlam, 1910-1942 (ed. Dr Jim Beach, 2010) vol. 30 ISBN 978-0-75245846-5
- The Military Papers of Lieutenant-General Frederick Stanley Maude, 1914-1917 (ed. Dr Andrew Syk, 2011) vol. 32 ISBN 978-0-75248619-2
- The Kenya Papers of General Sir George Erskine 1953-1955 (ed. Dr Huw Bennett & Professor David French, 2013) vol. 33 ISBN 978-0-75249776-1
- Military Intelligence from Germany 1906-1914 (ed. Matthew S. Seligmann, 2014) vol. 34 ISBN 978-0-75096071-7
- The Diary of Corporal Vince Schürhoff 1914-1918 (ed. Jim Beach, 2015) vol. 35 ISBN 978-0-75096600-9
- Liaison: General Pierre des Vallières at British General Headquarters, January 1916 to May 1917 (ed. Elizabeth Greenhalgh, 2016) vol. 36 ISBN 978-0-75096784-6
- The Military Papers and Correspondence of Major-General J. F. C. Fuller, 1916-1933 (ed. Dr Alaric Searle, 2017) vol. 37 ISBN 978-0-75098365-5
- Lord Gorell and the Army Education Corps 1918-1920 (ed. Dr Jim Beach, 2019) vol. 39 ISBN 978-0-75099138-4
- The Military Papers of Field Marshal Sir Claude Auchinleck, Volume 1: 1940-42 (ed. Timothy Bowman, 2021) vol. 40 ISBN 978-1-83838770-9
- The First World War Diary of Noël Drury, 6th Royal Dublin Fusiliers: Gallipoli, Salonika, the Middle East and the Western Front (ed. Richard S. Grayson, 2022) vol. 41 ISBN 978-1-83838771-6
- The Military Papers and Correspondence of Major General Guy Dawnay, 1915-1919 (ed. Dr Aimée Fox, 2024) vol. 42 ISBN 978-1-83838772-3

=== Miscellaneous ===
- Military Miscellany I: Manuscripts from the Seven Years' War, the First and Second Sikh Wars, and the First World War (eds. Alan J. Guy, R. N. W. Thomas & Gerard J. DeGroot, 1996) vol. 12 ISBN 978-0-75091675-2
  - George Durant’s Journal of the Expedition to Martinique and Guadeloupe, 1758-1759 (ed. Dr Alan J. Guy)
  - Daniel Robinson: Letters from India, 1845-1849 (ed. Dr Robin N. W. Thomas)
  - The Reverend George Duncan at GHQ, 1916-1918 (ed. Dr Gerard DeGroot)
- Military Miscellany II: Manuscripts from Marlborough's Wars, the American War of Independence, and the Boer War (eds. David Chandler with Christopher Scott, Marianne M. Gilchrist & Robin Jenkins, 2005) vol. 23 ISBN 978-0-75094088-7
  - The Journal of Sergeant John Wilson, 1694-1727 (ed. Dr David Chandler with Christopher Scott)
  - Captain the Hon William Leslie (1751-1777), His Life, Letters and Commemoration (ed. Dr Marianne M. Gilchrist)
  - Diary of Private Robert Cross, 1899-1901 (ed. Robin Jenkins)
