= Richard Grayson (academic) =

British historian (born 1969)

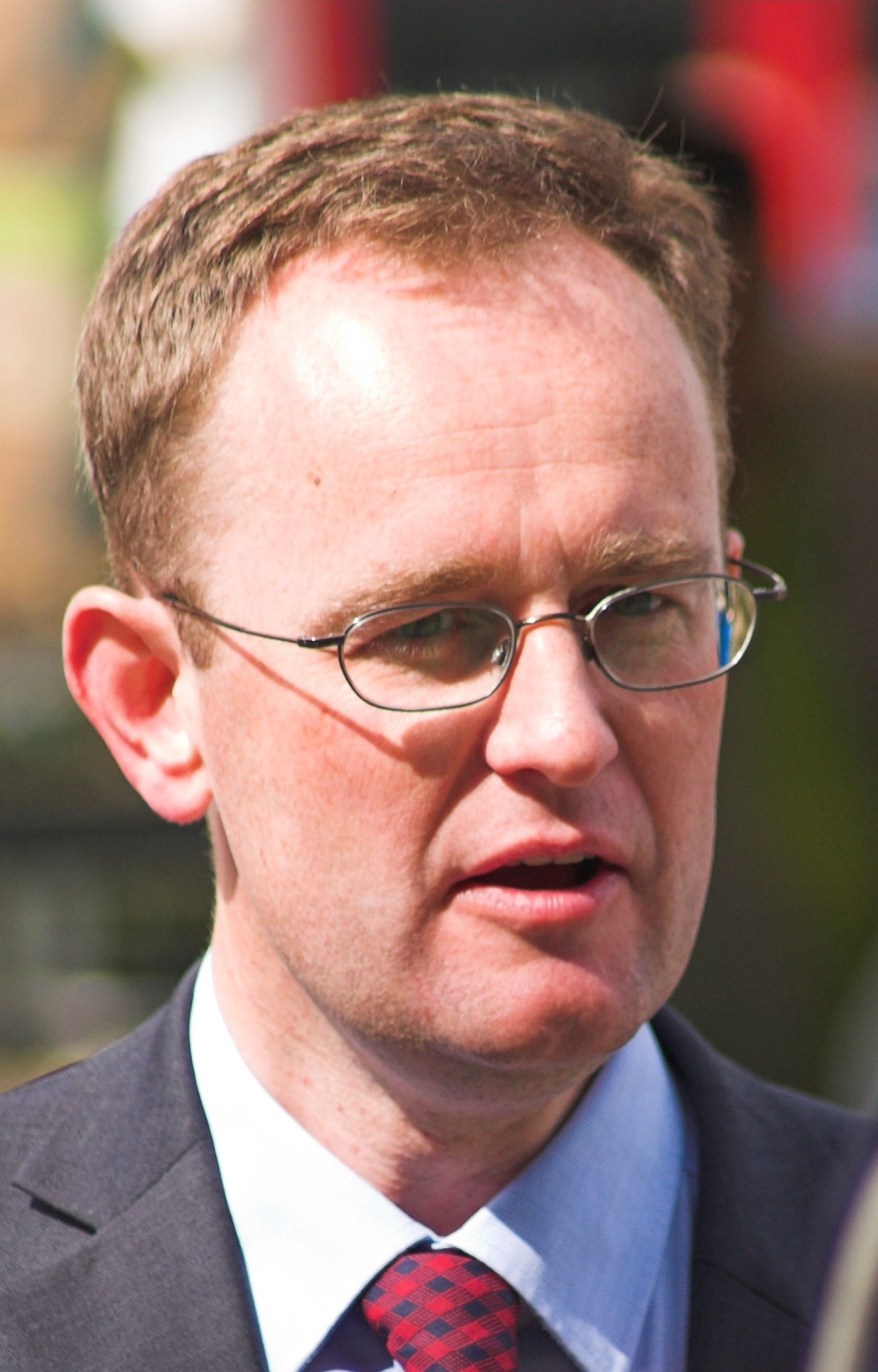

Personal details
- Born: 18 April 1969 (age 57) Hemel Hempstead, Hertfordshire, England
- Party: Labour (2013–present)
- Other political affiliations: Liberal Democrats (1988–2013)
- Spouse: Lucy Grayson
- Children: Edward Grayson
- Education: University of East Anglia; The Queen's College, Oxford
- Occupation: Professor
- Profession: Birkbeck, University of London

Richard Sean Grayson (born 18 April 1969 in Hemel Hempstead) is a British historian. He is currently Dean of the Faculty of Humanities and Social Sciences at Birkbeck, University of London.

== Education ==
Grayson was educated at Lime Walk Primary School, Hemel Hempstead (Comprehensive) School, the University of East Anglia (1st Class BA Honours in English and American History), and The Queen’s College, Oxford (Doctor of Philosophy in Modern History).

== Academic research ==
His historical research is currently concentrated on Ireland and the First World War, with his most important books being Belfast Boys: How Unionists and Nationalists Fought and Died Together in the First World War (Continuum, 2009), Dublin's Great Wars: The First World War, the Easter Rising and the Irish Revolution (Cambridge University Press, 2018), and Cork: The Irish Revolution, 1912-23 (Four Courts Press, 2026). He also edited At War with the 16th (Irish) Division, 1914-18: The Staniforth Letters (2012) and co-edited (with Fearghal McGarry) Remembering 1916: The Easter Rising, the Somme and the Politics of Memory in Ireland (2016). Previous work includes books on Austen Chamberlain’s term of office as foreign secretary and the inter-war Liberal Party, and articles on Leo Amery and appeasement, the Channel Tunnel project, and Mods and Rockers in the 1960s.

Grayson was involved in a number of First World War centenary projects. He was the chair of the Academy Advisory Group for the digital projects run by the Imperial War Museums, including Operation War Diary and Lives of the First World War. He was an Associate Member of the First World War Centenary Committee in Northern Ireland and contributed to the two-part Ireland’s Great War first broadcast on BBC 1 Northern Ireland in February 2015. He co-edits the IrelandWW1 website and was involved in the Living Legacies 1914-1918 First World War Engagement Centre. Work as part of this included leading a walking tour of West Belfast around sites connected with First World War veterans.

== Political activities ==
=== Labour Party (since 2013) ===
Grayson joined the Labour Party in September 2013. Later that year he co-authored with Dan Jarvis an article about commemoration of the First World War arguing that Britain needs to ‘emerge from 2014-18 having not only paid tribute to sacrifice, but also remembering survivors and service, and more accurately understanding the true significance of the Great War.’ During the 2015 general election Grayson actively supported Labour candidates in Hemel Hempstead, St Albans and Watford. In the 2015 Labour leadership election Grayson declared support for Yvette Cooper and for Caroline Flint as deputy. In November 2015 he was elected to the executive of Hemel Hempstead Constituency Labour Party.

=== Public policy and political commentary ===
His work on public policy includes an edited volume on social liberalism co-edited with David Howarth and Duncan Brack and including contributions from Chris Huhne, Matthew Taylor, Nick Clegg and Steve Webb. In 2002 he co-wrote a pamphlet with Nick Clegg on secondary education systems, based on research in the Netherlands, Denmark and Sweden. The pamphlet recommended the policy which became the ‘pupil premium’ included in the 2010 coalition agreement. With Jonathan Rutherford he co-edited After the Crash: Reinventing the Left in Britain which included chapters from Jon Cruddas, Caroline Lucas and Steve Webb. He has published an article on public policy in Newark, New Jersey, examining the work of Mayor Cory Booker, a friend from his time studying at Oxford. He has commentated on politics for both The Independent and The Guardian (see ‘Political Commentary’ section below) and appeared on Any Questions and was the only member of the panel to reach the venue on time when Any Questions? was cancelled for the first time in its history in April 2011. He has blogged for the Huffington Post having written on subjects from politics and history to his support for Queens Park Rangers F.C.

=== Liberal Democrats (1988–2013) ===
Grayson was involved in the Liberal Democrats at several levels of the party between 1988 and 2013 when he left, joining Labour shortly afterwards. He was the party’s National Youth and Student Officer in 1991–92, Director of the Centre for Reform (now called CentreForum) in 1998–99, and was Director of Policy of the Liberal Democrats in 1999–2004. That role also included spending two years as Charles Kennedy’s speechwriter. He was the party’s parliamentary candidate for Hemel Hempstead constituency in the 2005 and 2010 general elections, gaining 4.4% and 6% increases in the vote to move into second place. In 2008 he was listed as 48th on the Daily Telegraph’s list of the 50 most influential Liberal Democrats and in 2009 was placed in 39th. He was Vice-Chair of the Liberal Democrat Federal Policy Committee in 2008–2010 and was a critic of the coalition between the Conservative Party and the Liberal Democrats. In particular, he argued that ‘The Liberal Democrat leadership believed in "savage cuts" long before they entered government’, that they have ‘no electoral mandate’ for parts of the 2010 Budget and that ‘Liberal Democrats may soon realise that a centre-left party is being led from the centre-right.’ This argument was cited in several newspapers, and was developed in longer pieces for Compass and the New Statesman. In December 2010 he urged Liberal Democrat members to seize the opportunity of Ed Miliband's leadership by engaging in dialogue with Labour. Following that, he was invited by Ed Miliband to contribute to Labour's policy review and he accepted the invitation. However, he remained a member of the Liberal Democrat 'Facing the Future' policy review, which reported in July 2011. Grayson left the Liberal Democrats in 2013 and has since joined the Labour Party.

== Main publications ==
- Cork: The Irish Revolution, 1912-23 (Dublin: Four Courts Press, 2026)
- (editor), The First World War Diary of Noël Drury, 6th Royal Dublin Fusiliers: Gallipoli, Salonika, the Middle East and the Western Front (London: The Army Records Society, 2022)
- Dublin's Great Wars: The First World War, the Easter Rising and the Irish Revolution (Cambridge: Cambridge University Press, 2018)
- (editor with Fearghal McGarry), Remembering 1916: The Easter Rising, the Somme and the Politics of Memory in Ireland (Cambridge: Cambridge University Press, 2016)
- At War with the 16th Irish Division 1914-1918: The Letters of J H M Staniforth (London: Pen & Sword Military, 2012)
- British Politics: A Beginner's Guide (Oxford: One World, 2010)
- (Co-editor with Jonathan Rutherford), After the Crash: Reinventing the Left in Britain (London: Lawrence & Wishart, 2010).
- Belfast Boys: How Unionists and Nationalists Fought and Died Together in the First World War (London: Continuum, 2009).
- (Co-editor, with Duncan Brack and David Howarth), Reinventing the State: Social Liberalism for the 21st Century (London: Politicos, 2007).
- 'Leo Amery's Imperialist Alternative to Appeasement in the 1930s', Twentieth Century British History, 17, 4 (2006), pp. 489–515.
- (Co-author with Nick Clegg), Learning from Europe : Lessons in Education, (London : Centre for European Reform, 2002).
- Liberals, International Relations and Appeasement: The Liberal Party, 1919–39, (London: Frank Cass, 2001).
- 'Mods, Rockers, and Juvenile Delinquency in 1964: The Government Response', Contemporary British History, 12, 1 (1998), pp. 19–47.
- Austen Chamberlain and the Commitment to Europe: British Foreign Policy, 1924–29, (London: Frank Cass, 1997).
- 'The British Government and the Channel Tunnel, 1919–39', Journal of Contemporary History, 31, 1 (Jan. 1996), pp. 125–144.

== Political commentary ==
- Clegg and Cameron's Illiberal 'Big Liberal Society', Guardian Comment is Free, 20 July 2010
- 'The Struggle for the Soul of Liberalism', New Statesman, 12 July 2010, pp. 30–33
- 'The Liberal Democrat Journey to a Lib-Con Coalition - and Where Next?' (London: Compass, 2010)
- The Lib Dem leadership’s self-flagellating appetite for cuts’, Guardian Comment is Free, 22 June 2010
- ‘Lib Dems must dare to be different over prisoners’ voting rights’, Guardian Comment is Free 9 June 2010
- ‘Lab and Lib: a dream team’ with Neal Lawson, Guardian Comment is Free, 9 May 2010
- ‘Leader still needs to show that he is the man for No 10’, Independent, 19 September 2005
- ‘The Liberal Democrats Still Face a Long Journey’, 14 May 2005, Independent, 14 May 2005
- ‘Don’t become too safe in your views Mr Kennedy’, Independent, 25 September 2004.
