= Fearghal McGarry =

Irish historian

Fearghal McGarry (born 16 November 1971) is an Irish historian specializing in the history of Ireland in the 20th century, currently Professor of Modern Irish History at Queen's University, Belfast.

McGarry is the author of books about Ireland in the first half of the twentieth century. He is a member of the Royal Irish Academy.

== Education ==
McGarry was educated at University College Dublin and Trinity College Dublin, where he graduated in modern history.

== Career ==
McGarry was a lecturer in Irish History at Trinity College Dublin, and later a Government of Ireland research fellow at the National University of Ireland, Maynooth. From there, he became Senior Lecturer in History at Queen's University, Belfast, before appointment as Professor of Modern Irish History in the School of History, Anthropology, Philosophy and Politics.

He was joint editor of Irish Historical Studies and a member of the editorial board of Proceedings of the Royal Irish Academy (Section C). He is currently a member of the advisory group for the Ulster Museum's project Collecting the Troubles and Beyond.

McGarry is the author of a number of books on Irish history in the twentieth century, including studies of Frank Ryan (2002), Eoin O'Duffy (2005), and the Easter Rising (2010). Most of his recent work is published by the Oxford University Press.

McGarry is a member of the Royal Irish Academy and in February 2021 was chosen as the Boston College Burns Visiting Scholar and gave the Burns Lecture on 31 March: Communism, Sex and All That Jazz: The Struggle Against Modernity in Interwar Ireland. With fellow academics from the University of Edinburgh and Boston College, he leads a research project funded by the Arts and Humanities Research Council, A Global History of Irish Revolution 1916-1923, which includes museum exhibitions and special issues of Irish Historical Studies and History Ireland, together with a book to be published by New York University Press. The project concluded with an international conference at Boston College in September 2021.

== Selected works ==
- "Irish Newspapers and the Spanish Civil War", Irish Historical Studies Vol. 33, No. 129 (May 2002), pp. 68–90
- Frank Ryan (2002)
- Irish Politics and the Spanish Civil War (1999)
- Eoin O'Duffy: A Self-Made Hero (Oxford University Press, 2005)
- The Rising: Ireland Easter 1916 (Oxford University Press, 2010)
- The Abbey Rebels of 1916: A Lost Revolution (Gill & Macmillan, 2015, ISBN 0717168816)
- Remembering 1916: The Easter Rising, the Somme and the Politics of Memory in Ireland (Cambridge University Press, 2016), edited with Richard Grayson
- The Irish Revolution: A Global History (New York University Press, 2022), edited with Patrick Mannion
