= Edward Cronin (musician) =

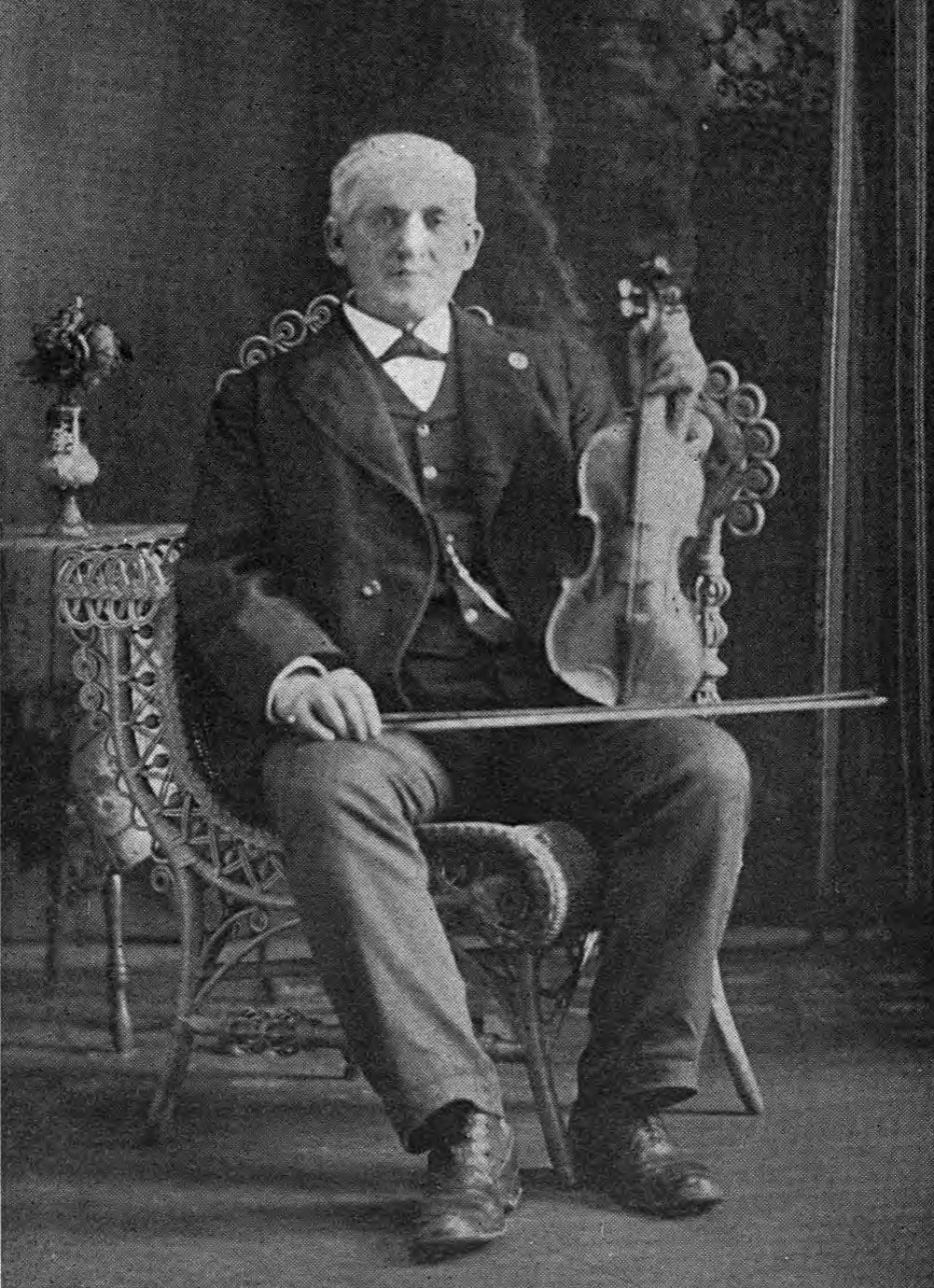
- Born: 1842; Limerick Junction, County Tipperary, Ireland
- Died: May 22, 1918 (aged 75–76); Chicago, Illinois
- Resting place: Mt. Carmel Cemetery, Hillsdale, Illinois
- Occupation: Musician
- Years active: 1890-1918

Edward Cronin (1842-1918) was an Irish American fiddler who specialized in Irish folk music. He was especially important to the work of Francis O'Neill, the Chicago police chief and collector of Irish music, who wrote “Mr. Cronin’s memory proved a rich mine of traditional Irish melody,” and often described the many tunes he learned from Cronin. Four recordings of Cronin are among the earliest audio documents of how Irish folk music was played, and show him to have been a gifted player with a distinctive style. His influence on present day Irish music was substantial.

Cronin was born in Limerick Junction, County Tipperary, in about 1842. In 1863 he married Margaret Clancy in Ireland. O’Neill wrote that Cronin was trained as a weaver, but could find no work in that trade. He emigrated the United States in 1871 and lived for a time in Troy, New York, where the 1875 census listed him as a "bread peddler" living with his wife's relatives.

By 1900 he lived in Chicago at 1600 North Hamilton avenue, employed at the Deering Harvester Works, making farm machinery. “His work, day after day for many years, had been grinding castings on an emery wheel" O'Neill wrote, resulting in "coarse and scarred fingers".

O’Neill described him as in some ways a genius: "he could multiply compound numbers mentally and almost instantaneously, a faculty he possessed all through life; and as a composer of dance music, particularly hornpipes, from any given theme, his versatility was surprising." He supplemented his income with musical performances in Chicago's Irish American community and was a member of the Chicago Irish Music Club], an organization devoted to the celebration and preservation of Irish music and dance.

Cronin could read and write musical notation well, and O'Neill depended on him heavily, both as a source of tunes from memory and as a transcriber of tunes from others. He later had a falling out with Cronin at least partly over the problem of assigning key signatures to Irish tunes. O'Neill, who had only a rudimentary understanding of Irish music, believed that Cronin had assigned the wrong key signature to more than two dozen tunes. "In all my writings", he told Irish music collector Bernard Bogue, "I never alluded to the fact that one edition, 1000 copies, of The Dance Music of Ireland was destroyed on account of the numerous errors in key signatures made by Edward Cronin".

Additionally, many members of the Chicago Irish Music Club were policemen and enjoyed good pay and substantial pensions while Cronin, vital to O’Neill’s project, was at age 68 still employed at a grinding wheel. O’Neill as a captain and later as chief, was consistently anti-union and Cronin may have resented the use of police authority in the 1903 Deering Harvester strike and later, the teamsters' strike of 1905, in which O'Neill protected strikebreakers.

After 1905 the Cronins moved to 2961 Clybourn Avenue in Chicago. Margaret died in 1917. Edward died in May 1918. Both are buried in Mount Carmel Cemetery, Hillside, Illinois.
