= Ned Cronin =

Irish army officer

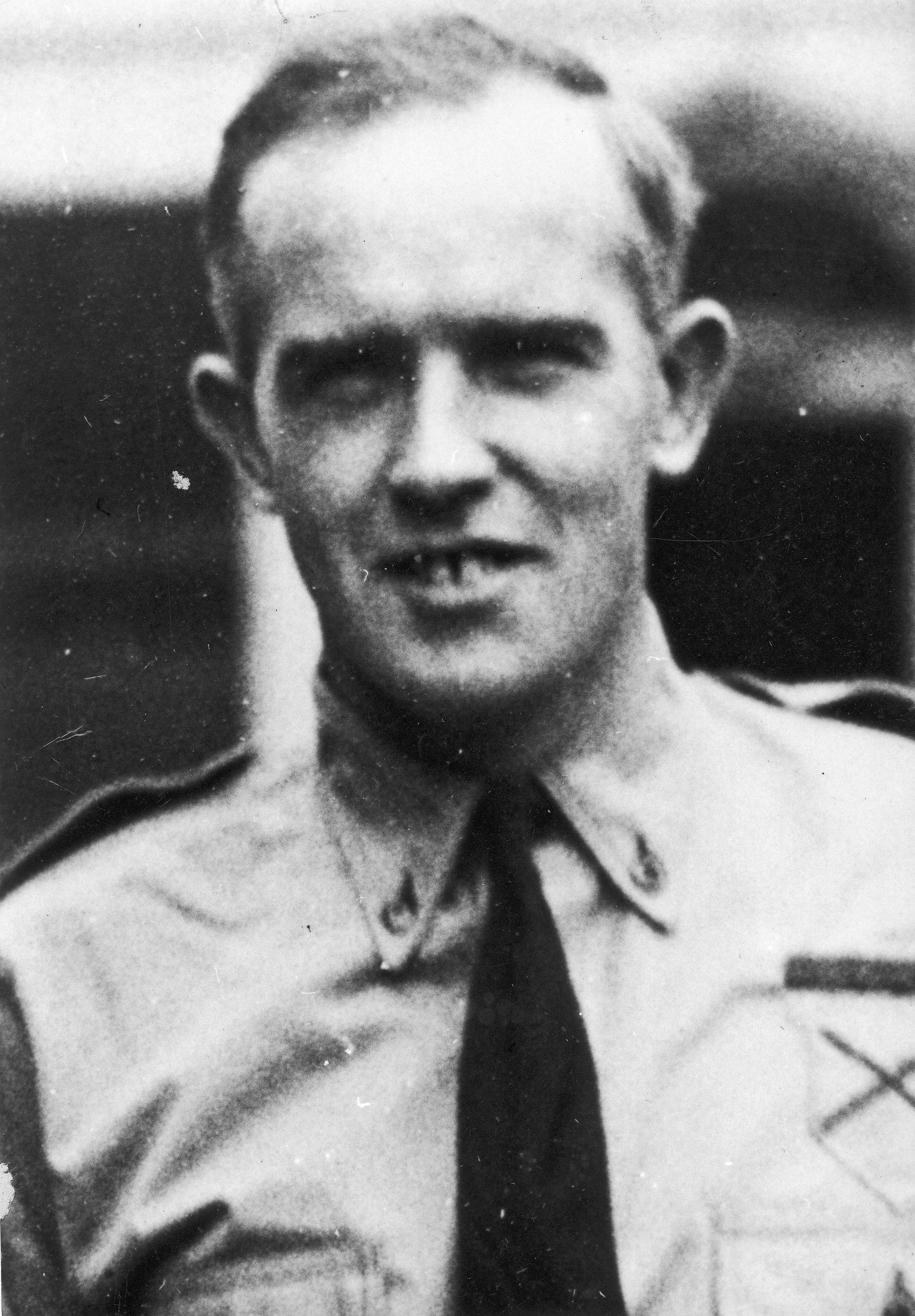
- Ned Cronin in blueshirt attire

Personal details
- Born: 10 July 1897 Charleville, County Cork, Ireland
- Died: 1946 Shandrum, Newtownshandrum, County Cork, Ireland
- Party: Fine Gael

Military service
- Rank: Commandant
- Unit: Irish Republican Army; Irish National Army
- Battles/wars: War of Independence; Irish Civil War

Edward J. Cronin (10 July 1897 – 1946), was an Irish army officer, senior member of Fine Gael and a leader of the Blueshirts.

== Early life ==
He was the son of John and Johanna Cronin. One of his children, Noel died in 1930 aged 10 months.

== Career ==
Cronin fought in the Irish War of Independence. He supported the Anglo-Irish Treaty and joined the National Army of the Free State, he was made a Commandant. During the Civil War Cronin and 47 others in the National Army were forced to surrender to the Anti-Treaty IRA. He remained a part of the National Army after the wars, until 1933.

He was a founding member of the Blueshirts and was made its General secretary. It was Cronin who suggested that they adopt the now iconic blue uniform so that they could recognise each other during riots.

In December 1933, Cronin was arrested and imprisoned for three months on the charges of sedition and membership of an illegal organisation, the Blueshirts having been outlawed by the Fianna Fáil government that summer.

According to the Minister for Justice PJ Ruttledge, In July 1934 Cronin is said to have stated in a speech in Tipperary:

De Valera has spoken about dictatorship, but I say here tonight, if a dictatorship is necessary for the Irish people, we are going to have one.

Following the merger of Cumann na nGaedheal, the National Centre Party and the Blueshirts into one political party, Cronin was made a co-Vice President of Fine Gael along with W. T. Cosgrave and James Dillon. The Blueshirts were now to act as the youth wing of the new party.

When Eoin O'Duffy, the former leader of the Blueshirts resigned as leader of Fine Gael he attempted to retake his old position. Cronin refused to accept this and the Blueshirts split into two factions, the pro-Cronin faction and the pro-O’Duffy faction.

Cronin opposed the formation of the Irish Brigade for the purposes of fighting in the Spanish Civil War, saying it had as much chance to reach Zaragoza as it did of reaching the Moon.

In October 1936, Fine Gael voted to suspend the Blueshirts indefinitely, effectively axing them and Cronin. Most of Cronin's personal wealth had been tied up in the Blueshirts and following their demise, he emigrated to England to work as a printer. The Taoiseach, John A. Costello, invited him back to serve as an adviser to the government, but he died during his return. He was buried in Shandrum, Newtownshandrum, County Cork.
