= Lough Egish =

Rural area in County Monaghan, Ireland

Coordinates: 54.067°N 6.800°W

Lough Egish (Irish: Loch Éigis, meaning 'lake of the learned man') is a rural area in County Monaghan, Ireland, which takes its name from the local lake, Lough Egish. It is situated approximately midway between Ballybay, Castleblayney and Carrickmacross.

In 1901, after the Cooperative movement was formed in Ireland by Sir Horace Plunkett, a group comprising ten local farmers set about forming the County Monaghan-based Lough Egish dairy co-operative which was, until the 1980s, independently known as Lough Egish Co-operative and Dairy Society. Lough Egish later merged with the County Cavan-based Killeshandra Co-op Creameries in an effort to consolidate the movement's ambitions of becoming the largest milk processing unit in the north midlands region by rationalising the capacity for milk production to form a new company called Lakeland Dairies. The other major milk processing co-operative in the region Bailieboro Co Op was a later addition to the Lakelands Dairies, making the group one of the largest and most successful milk processing companies in Ireland. There is a DVD about Lough Egish; its name is A Trip To Loch Egish.

Lough Egish and surrounding areas host a number of national and international brands including Agro Merchants, Cooltrim Oil Co Ltd, Gaffey Motors, Glanbia, Lakeland Dairies, Lavelle Hardware, Malones, Platinum Tanks, Rangeland Foods and SFS Steel Formed Sections.
