= Conacre =

Land lease system in Ireland

Conacre (a corruption of corn-acre, or derived from Irish word conartha meaning agreement or contract), in Ireland, is a system of letting land, formerly in small patches or strips, and usually for tillage (growth of corn or potatoes).

== Concept ==
Most common in Munster and Connacht for a variety of crops, in Leinster and Ulster conacre was used almost exclusively for a potato crop alone. In former times, one third of agricultural land in Northern Ireland was let as conacre. Some historians believe that it was one of the factors responsible for the Great Irish Famine.

During the 19th century, conacre land was normally let on an eleven-month system — considered to be of sufficient length to sow and harvest a crop but without creating a formal relationship between landlord and tenant. Holding the land under conacre granted no legal rights to the land. Rent was paid in cash, labour or a combination of both.

The land owner would manure the land before letting, usually at a rate of between £6 and £14 per acre in 1840. The principal defect in the practice was the nature of its speculative system; the labourer who took the land was frequently an indigent speculator who, depending on the weather, either made a profit or faced ruin. During the 19th century, there were many cases of middlemen renting the land and then sub-letting on conacre to desperate landless labourers or cottiers at a high profit.

In March 2009, a ruling by the Court of Appeal of Northern Ireland removed tax relief on land with development potential which has been let under conacre. Commenting on the ruling, the Ulster Farmers' Union president said "With one third of the land in Northern Ireland let as conacre, the ruling needs to be carefully considered by many local families. Inheritance of land within families is an important aspect of family farming in Northern Ireland and we want to protect that. We certainly don't want to see farming families facing unforeseen large tax bills."
