= Peter O'Connor (Irish republican) =

Irish Communist and Republican (1903–1937)

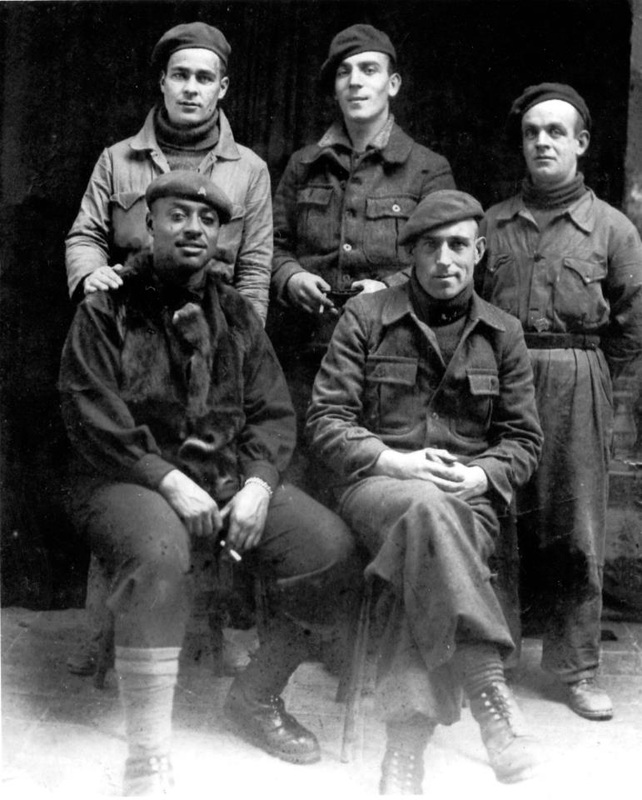
- O'Connor (standing, left) with fellow members of the Abraham Lincoln Brigade, 1937. Seated in front of him is Walter Benjamin Garland.

Waterford City Councillor
- In office 1944–1950

Personal details
- Born: 31 March 1912 Keilogue, Kilmacleague, County Waterford
- Died: 19 July 1999 (aged 87) Waterford City, County Waterford, Ireland
- Party: Labour Party
- Other political affiliations: Communist Party of Ireland; Communist Party of Great Britain; Republican Congress
- Awards: Hans Beimler Medal

Military service
- Allegiance: (Republic of Ireland) Irish Republic; (Spain) Second Spanish Republic
- Branch/service: (Republic of Ireland) Anti-Treaty IRA; International Brigades
- Rank: Sergeant
- Unit: Connolly Column, part of the XV International "Abraham Lincoln" Brigade
- Battles/wars: Irish Civil War; Spanish Civil War; Battle of Jarama; Battle of Brunete

Peter O'Connor (31 March 1912 – 19 June 1999) was an Irish republican and communist who fought as a volunteer in the Spanish Civil War as part of the International Brigades. It has been suggested by some sources that O'Connor saw the most fighting of any Irish volunteer for the Republican side in that war. He also served as a local councillor and activist in his home town of Waterford City.

== Early life ==
Peter O'Connor was the six children of carpenter James O'Connor. Born in the village of Keilogue, Kilmacleague, County Waterford in 1912, the family moved to Poleberry Street, Waterford City a year later. There were many Irish Republicans and Trade unionists amongst the extended O'Connor family (two brothers and an uncle were members of the Irish Republican Army, while his father was a branch secretary in the Amalgamated Society of Woodworkers) and their influence saw a nine-year-old O'Connor admitted to Fianna Eireann. It was as part of the Fianna that O'Connor reputedly took part of the Irish Civil War as a messenger boy serving the Anti-Treaty IRA. In 1929, at age seventeen, O'Connor transitioned from the Fianna into the IRA.

In the midst of the Great Depression of the 1930s, O'Connor was unable to master the skills of carpentry that his father and brothers processed, and was unemployed for long periods of time, finding work occasionally on building sites. It was during this time that O'Connor became attracted to communism, and linked up with Sean Murray to organise a Waterford branch of the Revolutionary Workers' Groups. In March 1933 O'Connor was amongst those who attended the conference in Dublin that saw the Revolutionary Workers' Groups merged into the Communist Party of Ireland. In 1934 O'Connor was amongst left-wing members of the IRA who wanted to see the IRA link their military goals with social agitation, and as part of this O'Connor, alongside Frank Edwards, helped found the Waterford branch of the Republican Congress, an attempt by left-wing Republicans to create a political body. As part of the Republican Congress, O'Connor tried to agitate on behalf of the unemployed and renters, and supported a building workers' strike in Waterford.

In June 1934 O'Connor quit the IRA after witnessing an attack on Protestant Republicans from Belfast carrying a communist banner by other Republicans during the annual commemoration of Wolfe Tone's death in Bodenstown, County Kildare. In September of that same year O'Connor was amongst eight Waterford delegates who attended the factious Dublin meeting of the Republican Congress which saw the party split over whether it should be a political party in its own right, or a "United Front" which serve as an alliance of many Republican groups across Ireland. Roddy Connolly of the Communist Party believed and supported the former, while Peadar O'Donnell believed and advocated for the latter. O'Connor supported the united front concept, but regardless that night saw the effective end of the Republican Congress, as once a vote was taken, the united front faction won but the political party advocates resigned en masse and left, a blow from which the Congress never recovered.

In the aftermath of the collapse of the Republican Congress, O'Connor immigrated to London in England (by stowing away on a coal barge), where he took up work in a rubber factory. Unbeknown to his employers, O'Connor was secretly organising inside the factory on behalf of the General and Municipal Workers’ Union. It was around this time that O'Connor joined the Communist Party of Great Britain and began participating in demonstrations against Oswald Mosley's British Union of Fascists, including the Battle of Cable Street in October 1936.

== Spanish Civil War ==
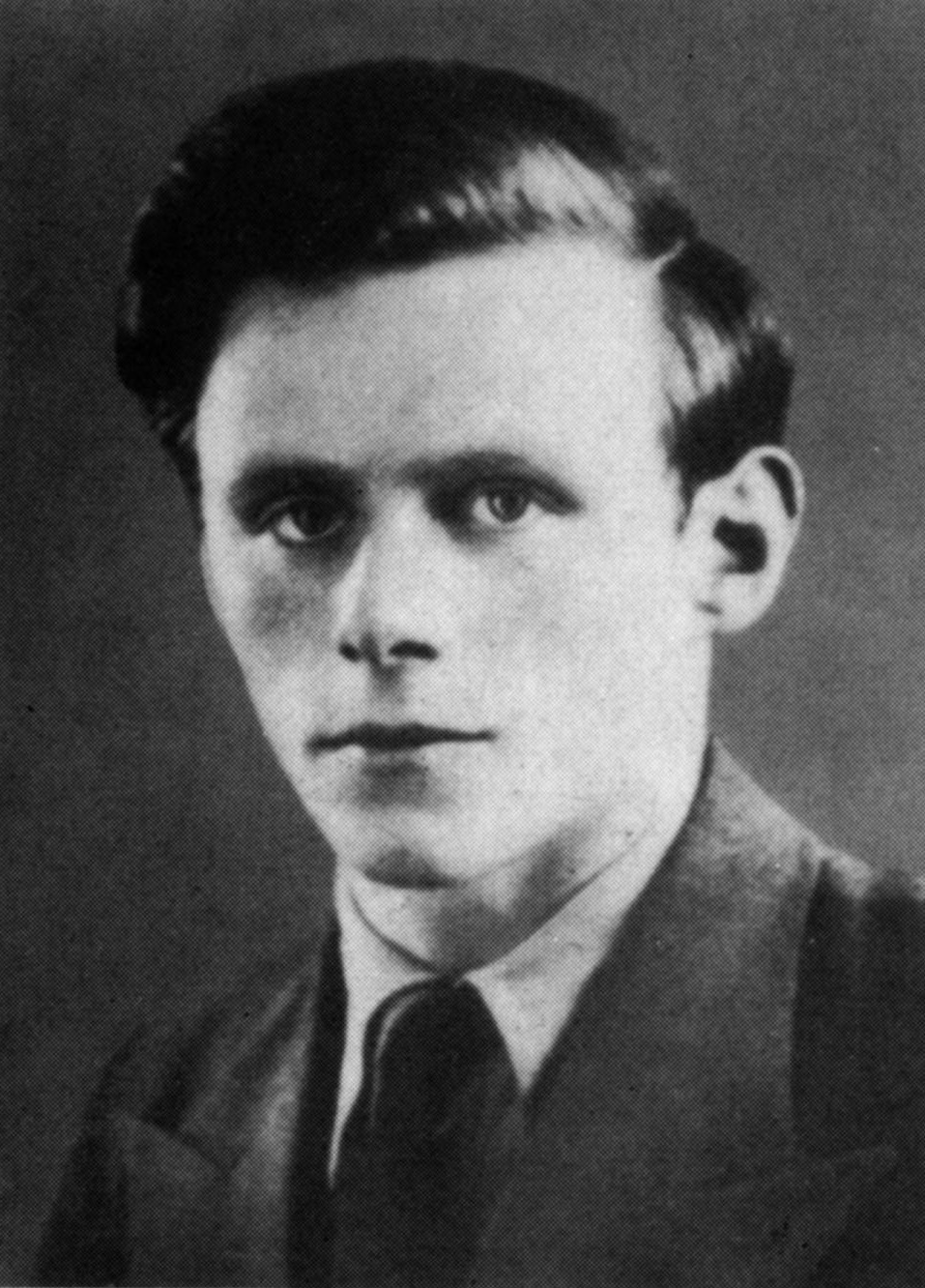
O'Connor, alongside his group from Waterford, carried the body of Charlie Donnelly back from the frontline

In December 1936 O'Connor enlisted in London with the International Brigades in order to fight in the Spanish Civil War on behalf of the Republican side, and reached Spain alongside 65 others just before Christmas Eve. O'Connor amongst 40 other Irishmen placed alongside British volunteers inside the XV International Brigade. However, during their training at a camp in Madrigueras, the Irish did not gel with the British, particularly after the Irish became aware that George Nathan, a former member of the Auxiliary Division of the Royal Irish Constabulary during the Irish War of Independence, was a commanding officer amongst the British. In addition to having fought against the Irish, Nathan was rumoured to have assassinated two civilian members of Sinn Féin during the war. The Irish decided to hold a vote on if they should remain amongst the British or request to be transferred into a unit of Americans. O'Connor argued against the transfer, arguing that Irish and British workers should unite on class alignment and dismiss ethnic conflict. However, the Irish voted by a clear majority to leave the British and O'Connor went with them, into what became the Connolly Column unit.

As part of the Connolly Column, O'Connor was promoted a number of times, reaching the rank of sergeant. During his time with the unit, they saw brutal fighting as part of the defence of Madrid, with the unit fighting as part of the Battle of Jarama and the Battle of Brunete. During the fighting, O'Connor suffered two serious attacks of typhoid, the cause of which he attributed to drinking the local water instead of alcohol as the rest of the Irish did (O'Connor was a lifelong teetotaller).

During the Battle of Jarama, O'Connor witnessed the death of the poet and fellow volunteer Charlie Donnelly. O'Connor, alongside his fellow Waterford volunteers Johnny and Paddy Power, carried Donnelly's body back from the front line.

A week after Brunete, O'Connor was the only Irishman remaining on the frontline, everyone else either being wounded or killed. Irish historian Lawrence William White suggests by this point O'Connor may have seen the most fighting of any Irish Republican volunteer. With the Irish casualties mounting, the commander of the Irish Frank Ryan pulled O'Connor from the line and ordered him to return to Ireland and speak publicly on behalf of the Republican side, to counter anti-Republican narratives being entertained there. O'Connor returned to Ireland in September 1937.

== Later life ==
Upon his return to Ireland, O'Connor joined the Labour party (despite retaining his membership of the Communist Party) in 1938. By 1939 he'd become secretary of Labour's Waterford branch. Between 1944 and 1950 O'Connor represented Labour on Waterford City Council. In 1946 O'Connor started working as an insurance agent for Royal Liver. He would hold that job for the rest of his working life.

In O'Connor's later years he became an activist against South African apartheid. In 1979 he accompanied Frank Edwards and follow Spanish war veteran Michael O'Riordan to East Germany to collect the remains of Frank Ryan and return them to Ireland.

In the wake of the collapse of the Soviet Union, O'Connor reaffirmed his communist views, stating "Nothing that has happened in recent years has deflected me from my belief in James Connolly's teaching of the necessity for the re-conquest of Ireland by its people and that Ireland will never be truly free until our working people are free and in possession of the wealth and the wealth-producing processes of their country".

In 1994 he was a part of a ceremony held at the ATGWU hall in Waterford in which two plaques created by Waterford Crystal dedicated to the ten Waterford Volunteers who went to Spain were unveiled. That same year O'Connor returned to Spain to attend the unveiling of a Republican memorial in the Jarama valley. At that ceremony, O'Connor stated "I truly believe that if fascism had been defeated in Spain and if France, Britain and America had supported the legally elected government at the time, then the Second World War would probably never have happened."

In 1996 O'Connor returned once more, this time to accept honorary citizenship of Spain alongside 360 other surviving volunteers. It was also in 1996 that O'Connor released a short autobiography entitled A Soldier of Liberty, containing excerpts from his Spanish diary.

Peter O'Connor died on 19 June 1999 in Waterford regional hospital.

== Personal life ==
O'Connor married Bridget "Biddy" Hartery in February 1939. They had one son and one daughter together. Their son Dr Emmet O'Connor became a noted labour historian and lecturer in political science at Magee College in Derry. O'Connor's nephew Seamus Ryan represented Labour on the Waterford City Council from 1999 to 2014.
