= Thomas Patten (socialist) =

Irish volunteer in the Spanish Civil War

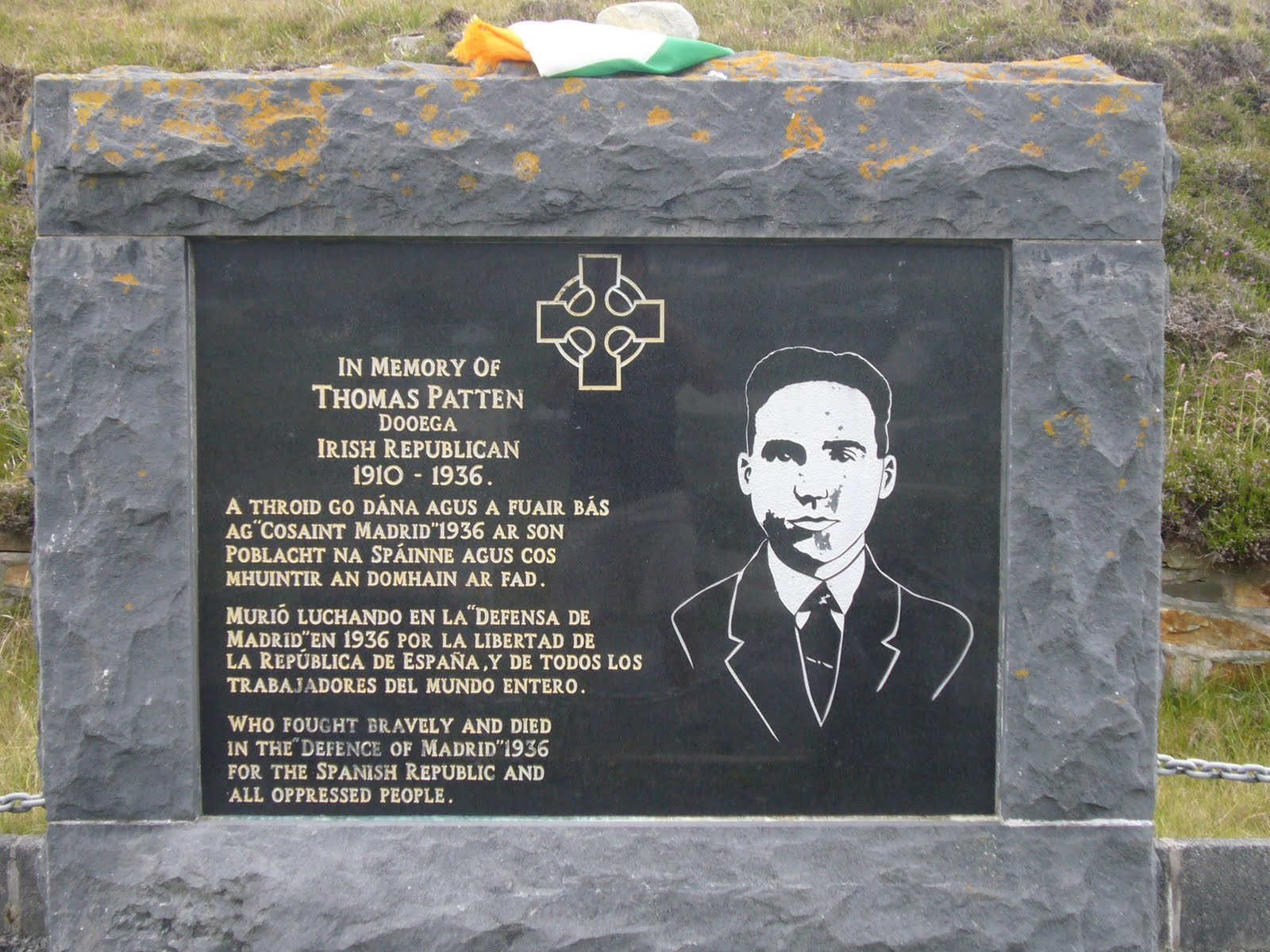
- Monument to Thomas Patten, Dooega, Achill Island

Personal details
- Born: 1910 Dooega, Achill Island, County Mayo
- Died: 1936 (aged 25–26) Boadilla del Monte
- Occupation: Irish activist

Military service
- Allegiance: Spanish Republic
- Branch/service: International Brigades
- Unit: Connolly Column
- Battles/wars: Spanish Civil War

Thomas Patten (1910 – 16/17 December 1936) was an Irish volunteer in the Spanish Civil War.

== Biography ==
He was born in Dooega, Achill Island, in the County Mayo Gaeltacht, one of a family of fourteen children. Irish was his first language. Patten emigrated to England as a teenager, working in Blackpool and London. In London he became involved with the Republican Congress, a socialist republican group. In October 1936, after the outbreak of the war in Spain, Patten left England to travel to Spain on his own, before the formation of the International Brigades. Upon his arrival in Madrid, he enlisted in the militia to assist in the defence of the city from insurgent fascist forces during the Siege of Madrid. He was killed at Boadilla del Monte on the night of 16/17 December 1936, the first person from an English-speaking country and the first Irishman of 74 killed in the conflict.

Peadar O'Donnell was the one who informed Patten's parents of his death. Years later dedicated his memoir of the war, Salud!, to "a young Achill boy".

A monument was raised to Patten in his native Dooega in 1984, funded by George Harrison, an Irish Republican also from Mayo. A ceremony was held to marked the creation of the momentum. 400 people where in attendance, included surviving members of the Patten family, the then chairman of the Labour Party Senator Michael D Higgins, a former president of the Irish Congress of Trade Unions Andy Barr; the general secretary of the Communist Party of Ireland, Jimmy Stewart, and the Northern Ireland Secretary of the Amalgamated Transport and General Workers’ Union, Ernie McBride. There were several members of the ITGWU including Michael Kilcoyne, a Castlebar councillor, and Michael O'Riordan, who also fought in Spain, and his son Manus.

Christy Moore mentions Patten in his song Viva la Quinta Brigada
