= Comhairle na Poblachta =

Irish republican organisation

Comhairle na Poblachta (Irish for 'Council of the Republic') was an Irish republican organisation established in 1929.

The organisation had the support of the IRA, which had agreed to its formation at its General Army Convention in January 1929. An early Saor Éire programme had also been proposed, but was rejected in favour of Comhairle na Poblachta. The IRA envisaged it as a coordinating body of anti-Treaty republican forces, and its membership was drawn from Sinn Féin, Fianna Éireann, the IRA, Cumann na mBan and left-wing republicans.

According to leading member Mary MacSwiney, the Comhairle sought "agreement and co-operation between the civil and military arms of the Republic". Other prominent members included Margaret Buckley, Maud Gonne, Count Plunkett, Frank Ryan, Peadar O'Donnell, Brian O'Higgins, and Mick Fitzpatrick. A weekly newspaper, An Phoblacht, was issued. Apart from their shared hostility to the Cumann na nGaedheal government, the party's members had little in common.

During the Army Convention in February 1931, the increased ranks of left-wing republicans led by Peadar O'Donnell approved a re-drafted Saor Éire programme. Following the formation of Saor Éire, Comhairle na Poblachta appeared to become defunct.

The Comhairle was not successful in its aims.
