= Charles Donnelly (poet) =

Irish poet and activist

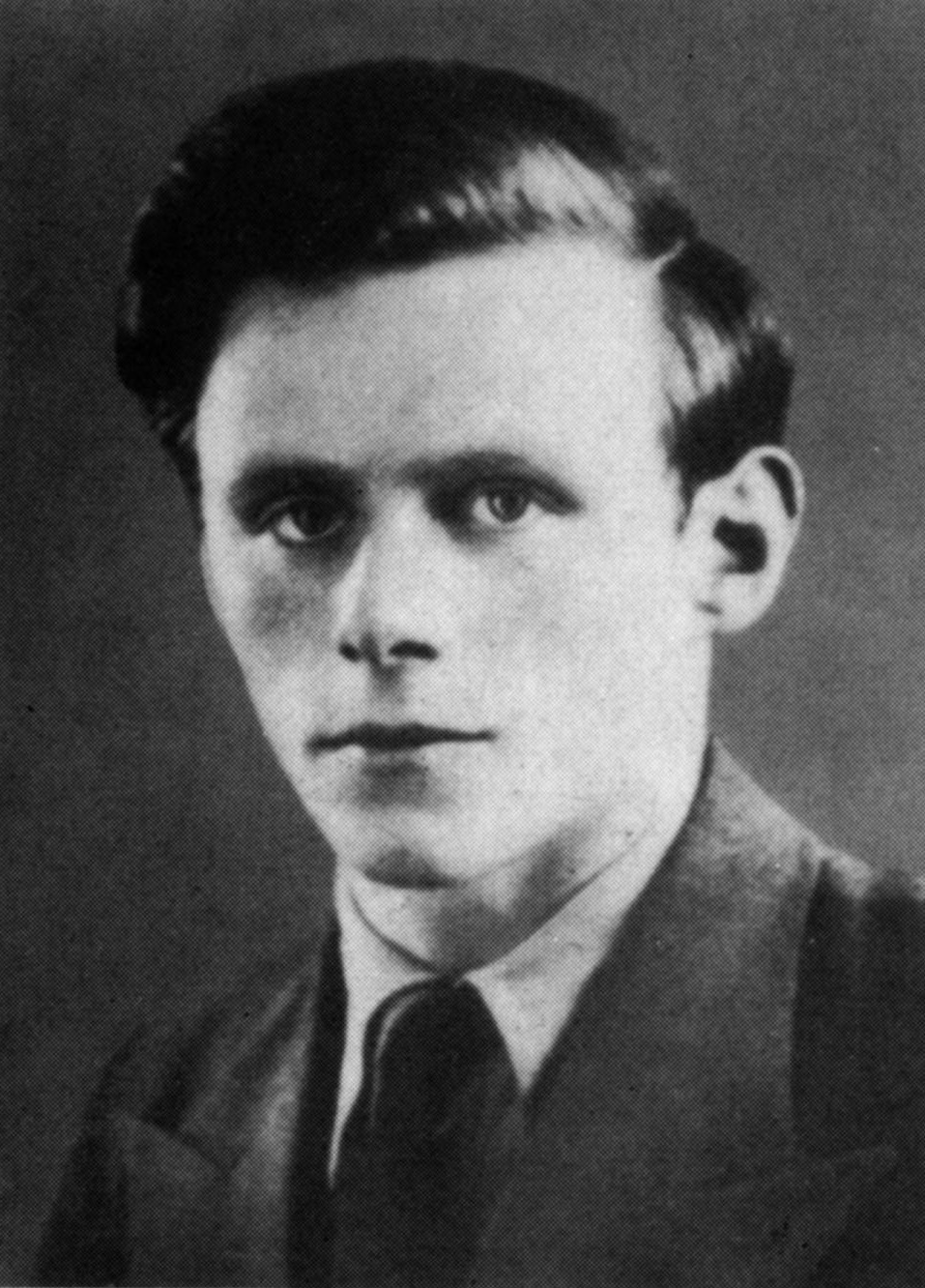
- Donnelly, c. 1935

Personal details
- Born: Charles Patrick Donnelly; 10 July 1914 Killybrackey, County Tyrone, Ireland
- Died: 27 February 1937 (aged 22) Arganda del Rey, Madrid, Spain
- Party: Republican Congress

Military service
- Allegiance: Spanish Republic
- Branch/service: International Brigades
- Years of service: 1936–1937
- Unit: Connolly Column, part of the XV International "Abraham Lincoln" Brigade
- Battles/wars: Spanish Civil War: Battle of Jarama †

Charles Patrick Donnelly (10 July 1914 – 27 February 1937) was an Irish poet, Irish Republican and left wing political activist. He was killed fighting on the republican side during the Spanish Civil War.

== Early life ==
Donnelly was born in Killybrackey, near Dungannon, County Tyrone on 10 July 1914, into a family of cattle breeders. His father, Joseph Donnelly, sold his farm in 1917 and the family moved to Dundalk and opened a greengrocer's shop. Joseph Donnelly became quite prosperous, running his shop, dealing cattle and buying and selling property in the Dundalk area. In addition to Charles, the Donnellys had five other sons and two daughters. Charles' mother, Rose, died in 1927, when he was 13 years old.

Charles Donnelly received his early education in the Christian Brothers school in Dundalk. When he was 14 in 1928, the family moved again, this time to Dublin, where Joseph bought a house on Mountjoy Square in the north inner city. He enrolled in O'Connell School on North Frederick Street, but was expelled after only a few weeks. He spent the next few months wandering the streets of Dublin during school time before his father discovered what had happened. At this time also, Charles met and was befriended by radical political activists from the IRA, the Communist Party of Ireland and the left-Republican group, Saor Éire.

His father and aunts then got Charles an apprenticeship with a carpenter, but he gave this up after a year to enroll in University College Dublin in 1931, where he studied Logic, English, History and the Irish language. In university he began writing poetry and prose for student publications but failed his first year examinations. At this time he also became deeply involved in radical left wing and republican politics. He dropped out of university in 1934, having failed his first year exams three times and joined the radical group, the Republican Congress. There he befriended veteran republicans Frank Ryan and George Gilmore. He also became involved in a romantic relationship with another republican activist, Cora Hughes, Éamon de Valera's goddaughter and later partner of George Gilmore. Gilmore described the relationship between himself, Cora Hughes and Donnelly: "The three of us were always good friends and good comrades...Charlie and I were closer than brothers. Even though he was younger, he was old beyond his years, politically and emotionally very mature." In July 1934 he was arrested and imprisoned for two weeks for his role in picketing a Dublin bakery with other Congress members. After this, his father expelled him from the family home and he spent a period sleeping rough in parks around Dublin.

== Political activism ==
The Republican Congress split at its first annual meeting in September 1934, but the 20-year-old Donnelly was elected to the National Executive of the truncated organisation. Thereafter, he wrote for the Congress newspaper on political and social questions. In January 1935, Donnelly was again arrested for assaulting a Garda (policeman) at a Congress demonstration and was imprisoned for a month. In February 1935, he left Ireland for London. In the British capital he formed the first Republican Congress branch in London and became its first chairman. He found employment variously as a dishwasher in pubs and cafes and as a reporter with an international news agency. While in London he remained a regular contributor to the Republican Congress newspaper (edited by Frank Ryan) and various left wing publications. Together with two other poets, Leslie Daiken and Ewart Milne, he was one of the founders of a duplicated publication called Irish Front (the London journal of the Republican Congress). Daiken admitted that many of the Irish Front editions were written almost entirely by Donnelly.

Eoin McNamee recalled Donnelly as "a frail looking Dublin man with a Tyrone background...he was something of an intellectual and clearly the theorist of the Irish Republican Congress in London at that time. He was well versed in Marxism, wrote for the Congress and Communist press, and frequently appeared on left wing public platforms."

== Spanish Civil War and Death ==
In July 1936, on the outbreak of the Spanish Civil War, he urged the Republican Congress to send fighters to the International Brigades. He himself returned to Dublin with the intention of organising such a force. By the end of 1936, he had gone again to London and joined the Brigades. He reached Spain on 7 January 1937 and at Albacete, met up with an Irish contingent, led by Frank Ryan, known as the Connolly Column who had come to Spain to fight on the Republican side. Donnelly and his comrades were attached to the American Abraham Lincoln Battalion. On 15 February, after receiving only rudimentary military training, the Abraham Lincoln battalion was thrown into the battle of Jarama, near Madrid. Donnelly reached the front on 23 February, where he was promoted to the rank of field commander. On 27 February his unit was sent on a frontal assault on the Nationalist positions on a hill named Pingarron. The object of the attack was to take the enemy trenches and ultimately to drive them across the Jarama River. Donnelly and his unit were pinned down by machine gun fire all day. In the evening, the Nationalists launched a counter-attack.

A Canadian veteran recalled,

We ran for cover, Charlie Donnelly, the commander of an Irish company is crouched behind an olive tree. He has picked up a bunch of olives from the ground and is squeezing them. I hear him say something quietly between a lull in machine gun fire: Even the olives are bleeding

The line would later become famous. A few minutes later, as his unit retreated, Donnelly was caught in a burst of gunfire. He was struck three times, in the right arm, the right side and the head. He collapsed and died instantly. His body lay on the battlefield until it was recovered by fellow Irish Brigader Peter O'Connor on 10 March. He was buried at Jarama in an unmarked grave with several of his comrades.

A collection of his work, written by his brother Joseph – Charlie Donnelly The Life and Poems Dedalus Press, was published in 1987. On the eve of the 71st anniversary of his death, 26 February 2008, Charles was commemorated with the unveiling of a plaque in his alma mater, UCD, attended by 150 people. The commemoration, organised jointly by a group of UCD students and the Donnelly family, was hosted by the School of English and also included a lecture by Gerald Dawe on Charlie's life and poetry. In April 2008, the UCD Branch of the Labour Party was renamed the Charlie Donnelly Branch in his honour.

Donnelly's friend Blanaid Salkeld commemorates him in her poem "Casualties", writing "That Charlie Donnelly small and frail/ And flushed with youth was rendered pale/ But not with fear, in what queer squalor/ Was smashed up his so-ordered valour." A 1976 documentary about the Civil War by Cathal O'Shannon is entitled 'Even The Olives are Bleeding'.

=== Poetry and Writing ===
Donnelly was survived by a brother, Joseph, who managed to get many of his poems published in 1987; only five or six were published in his lifetime. Discussing his work, Colm Tóibín said it "mixed an Audenesque exactitude with a youthful romanticism... his poem The Tolerance of Crows belongs in any anthology of modern poetry". In 1992 Donnelly had work included in Dedalus Irish Poets: An Anthology from Dedalus Press.

=== Legacy ===
In 1992 New Island Books published Even The Olives Are Bleeding: The Life and Times of Charles Donnelly by Joseph O'Connor; the book was launched by future Irish President Michael D. Higgins.

Donnelly was commemorated in the Christy Moore song Viva la Quinta Brigada.

Donnelly is a character in the 2005 novel The Family on Paradise Pier by Dermot Bolger, several chapters of which deal with the Spanish Civil War.

== Work ==
- Charlie Donnelly – the life and poems; by Joseph Donnelly, Dublin, Ireland : Dedalus, c1987, ISBN 0-948268-31-X, ISBN 0-948268-30-1

== Sources ==
- O'Connor, Joseph. Even the Olives are Bleeding – the life and times of Charles Donnelly, New Island Books, Dublin 1992; ISBN 1-874597-15-4
