= Nora Harkin =

Irish republican socialist and activist

- Born: Nora McGinley; 15 September 1910; Breenagh, near Glenswilly, County Donegal
- Died: 7 June 2012 (aged 101); Ashbury Nursing Home, Kill Avenue, Blackrock, County Dublin

Nora Harkin (15 September 1910 – 7 June 2012) was an Irish republican socialist and activist.

== Early life and family ==
Nora Harkin was born Nora McGinley at her family farm in Breenagh, near Glenswilly, in County Donegal. Her parents were Michael and Bridget McGinley (née McDevitt). Her father was a Fenian and songwriter. Her maternal grandfather, Antoin Ned McDevitt (1825–1917), would tell her his memories of the Great Famine, and the family were all opposed to the Anglo-Irish Treaty and the creation of the Irish Free State. Due to the poverty in County Donegal, her brothers emigrated to the United States, and Harkin became a committed republican socialist.

== Life in Dublin ==
McGinley was a talented performer, singing and dancing at céilithe and concerts near her home town. In the spring of 1932, she moved to Dublin to take up a temporary post in the Irish Hospitals' Sweepstake. The post was initially only for 6 weeks, but she remained there for a number of years. She was introduced to Charlie Harkin in October 1932 at the Mansion House at a céilí raising money for the Republican Prisoners' Dependants' Fund. Charlie was active in Clan na Gael, and introduced her to a circle of Dublin republican socialists, including George Gilmore, Cora Hughes, and Bobbie Walsh. Harkin and Walsh shared a flat and worked together in the Sweepstake, forging a lifelong friendship and political partnership. Walsh went on to marry Frank Edwards. Charlie Harkin left the IRA with Peadar O'Donnell, and was one of the founders of the Republican Congress in 1934. Harkin married Charlie on 18 April 1938 in Stranorlar, County Donegal. Her husband had a long period of ill health before his death in 1979. This made Harkin the family's chief and sole earner. The couple had two sons Michael and Niall, and a daughter, Fiona who died in infancy in 1943.

Harkin became a supporter of left-wing republicanism in rejection of the militaristic and chauvinistic nationalism associated with Éamon de Valera, compounded by the implicit subjugation of women in the 1937 Irish constitution. She was a member of the Republican Congress executive, taking part in protests and demonstrations which were cleared from the streets by Gardai with batons. She sat on the women's aid committee of the Irish Friends of the Spanish Republic, chaired by Hanna Sheehy-Skeffington. She was sympathetic to communism, but like Sheehy-Skeffington and Rosamond Jacob, she did not join the Communist Party as she believed she could accomplish more from the outside. In 1937, she was a founding member of the New Theatre Group, which performed contemporary American and European leftist drama under the leadership of Thomas O'Brien. Her singing was broadcast on Radio Éireann, and she acted at the Peacock Theatre and other venues in Dublin. She worked for Electrolux during the 1950s and 1960s.

== Volunteer work ==
With John Swift, Bobbie and Frank Edwards and others, she co-founded Ireland-USSR Society in October 1966. She served as the society's assistant secretary. She made the first of her 18 visits to the USSR in 1968, and travelled the length of the country. She later described visiting the memorial to the 500,000 citizens who died during the siege of Leningrad as the most moving experience of her entire life. In 1973, while establishing diplomatic relations with the USSR, the then Minister for Foreign Affairs Garret FitzGerald lauded the society's work in developing a relationship between the two countries. Alongside the society's treasurer, Angela McQuillan, Harkin was seen as the society's driving force, seeing her elected chair in 1987. She was among the invited guests who attended the welcome of Chairman Mikhail Gorbachev to Shannon Airport by the Department of Foreign Affairs on 2 April 1989. On her 80th birthday in 1990, Harkin was given a presentation by Gennadi Uranov, the Soviet ambassador to Ireland. The Society's 21st anniversary commemorative publication featured articles from Michael D. Higgins and Theo Dorgan. After the fall of the Soviet Union, the Society decided to rename itself the Irish International Friendship Society, and Harkin and McQuillan established the Ireland-Russia Society. Both groups quickly waned.

Harkin was a founding member of the Irish Anti-Apartheid Movement, and throughout the 1970s sat on the executive committee. She organised the sending of material support to prisoners and their families with Louise Parkinson, wife of Kader Asmal. She also worked as a volunteer with the Irish Family Planning Association in the 1970s and 1980s.

She first met Peadar O'Donnell at age 13 when she delivered a note from her father to him during the Civil War. Following her husband's death, the pair re-established contact, with O'Donnell living with Harkin in her home, The Lodge, Monkstown, Dublin, from May 1979 until his death in 1986. O'Donnell was visited by many academics, journalists and activists, whom Harkin would host. In the 1994 reissue of The Irish Republican Congress revisited by Patrick Byrne, she contributed to the foreword. She died at Ashbury Nursing Home, Kill Avenue, Blackrock, County Dublin on 7 June 2012, and is buried in Deans Grange Cemetery. Her son, Niall, is a sculptor.
