= Con Lehane (Irish republican) =

Irish politician (1912–1983)

- Lehane speaking at a Clann na Poblachta event

Teachta Dála
- In office February 1948 – May 1951
- Constituency: Dublin South-Central

Personal details
- Born: 7 May 1912 Belfast, Northern Ireland
- Died: 18 September 1983 (aged 71) Dublin, Ireland
- Resting place: St. Fintan's Cemetery, Dublin
- Party: Clann na Poblachta
- Spouse: Marie O'Neill (m. 1937)
- Children: 3
- Relatives: Joseph Connolly (uncle); Michael O'Lehane (uncle)
- Education: University College Dublin

Military service
- Branch/service: Irish Republican Army

Con Lehane (7 May 1912 – 18 September 1983) was a left-wing nationalist, a 1930s member of the IRA Army Council, anti-partitionist, solicitor, actor and politician.

== Background ==
Lehane was born in Belfast, Northern Ireland on 7 May 1912, the only surviving child of Denis Lehane, an excise officer originally from County Cork, and his wife Mary (née Connolly), a native of the Falls Road, Belfast. He grew up in an Irish-speaking household. Joseph Connolly the senator was his uncle on his mother's side, while Michael O'Lehane the trade unionist was his uncle on his father's side. His family emigrated to Hartlepool in 1912 and then to Dublin in 1920. He was educated at Synge Street CBS and University College Dublin, where he studied law. He qualified as a solicitor. He married Marie O'Neill in 1937, and they had a son and two daughters.

As a solicitor, he took to defending members of the Irish Republican Army (IRA) in the Irish Courts. He was active in other Republican and Nationalist circles: he was a member of the Moibhí Branch of Conradh na Gaeilge, and by the 1930s seems to have become active in the IRA itself. In 1931 he was involved in Saor Éire, an attempt by the Irish left-wing to create a communist political party that would have been linked to the IRA.

Lehan was arrested on 23 March 1935 during a series of raids on the homes of prominent Irish Republicans and members of the Republican Congress (44 men were taken into custody). He was sentenced to 18 months imprisonment by the Military Tribunal for sedition, membership in an unlawful organization (the IRA) and refusing to give an account of his movements.

He retired from the IRA in April 1938 with Seán MacBride as they were not prepared to support the planned bombing campaign in the United Kingdom during World War II. In 1940 he was a member of Córas na Poblachta, another attempt to build a Republican political party backed by the IRA.

Interned again in 1940 under the Offences against the State Acts 1939–1998 Lehane was made a commanding officer of the IRA prisoners in Arbour Hill Prison. While interned Lehane and five other Irish Republican prisoners went on a 26-day hunger strike, protesting being imprisoned without trial.

== Clann na Poblachta TD ==
He was elected to Dáil Éireann as a Clann na Poblachta Teachta Dála (TD) for the Dublin South-Central constituency at the 1948 general election. He lost his seat at the 1951 general election.

Lehane was an actor and had a keen interest in Irish language theatre. A committed Irish speaker Lehane was at home in it, whether on radio, stage or in street conversation. He was one of the leading actors of the Irish Language Theatre Company between 1943 and 1958. He was a member of Dublin City Council and of the Citizens for Civil Liberties committee.

In 1977 the remains of Frank Ryan, one of the leading left-wing Republicans of the 1930s, were repatriated from East Germany, and Lehane delivered the eulogy. That same year he secured a High Court ruling that Republican prisoners were entitled to speak privately to their solicitors while in custody.

He died on 18 September 1983 and is buried in St. Finan's cemetery, Dublin.

Dáil	Election	Deputy (Party)	Deputy (Party)	Deputy (Party)	Deputy (Party)	Deputy (Party)
13th	1948	Seán Lemass (FF)	James Larkin Jnr (Lab)	Con Lehane (CnaP)	Maurice E. Dockrell (FG)	John McCann (FF)
14th	1951	Seán Lemass (FF)	James Larkin Jnr (Lab)	Philip Brady (FF)	Maurice E. Dockrell (FG)	John McCann (FF)
15th	1954	Seán Lemass (FF)	James Larkin Jnr (Lab)	Thomas Finlay (FG)	Maurice E. Dockrell (FG)	Celia Lynch (FF)
16th	1957	Seán Lemass (FF)	Jack Murphy (Ind.)	Philip Brady (FF)	Maurice E. Dockrell (FG)	Celia Lynch (FF)
16th	1958 by-election	Seán Lemass (FF)	Patrick Cummins (FF)	Philip Brady (FF)	Maurice E. Dockrell (FG)	Celia Lynch (FF)
17th	1961	Seán Lemass (FF)	Patrick Cummins (FF)	Philip Brady (FF)	Maurice E. Dockrell (FG)	Joseph Barron (CnaP)
18th	1965	Seán Lemass (FF)	Frank Cluskey (Lab)	Philip Brady (FF)	Maurice E. Dockrell (FG)	Thomas J. Fitzpatrick (FF)
19th	1969	Richie Ryan (FG)	Ben Briscoe (FF)	Philip Brady (FF)	John O'Donovan (Lab)	4 seats 1969–1977
20th	1973	Richie Ryan (FG)	Ben Briscoe (FF)	Philip Brady (FF)	John Kelly (FG)	4 seats 1969–1977
21st	1977	Fergus O'Brien (FG)	Frank Cluskey (Lab)	Thomas J. Fitzpatrick (FF)	3 seats 1977–1981	
22nd	1981	Fergus O'Brien (FG)	Ben Briscoe (FF)	Thomas J. Fitzpatrick (FF)	Gay Mitchell (FG)	John O'Connell (Note: O'Connell served as Ceann Comhairle in the 22nd and 23rd Dáil from 1981 to 1983 and was returned automatically at the February 1982 and November 1982 general elections. He joined Fianna Fáil in January 1985.) (Ind.)
23rd	1982 (Feb)	Frank Cluskey (Lab)	Ben Briscoe (FF)	Thomas J. Fitzpatrick (FF)	Gay Mitchell (FG)	John O'Connell (Ind.)
24th	1982 (Nov)	Frank Cluskey (Lab)	Ben Briscoe (FF)	Fergus O'Brien (FG)	Gay Mitchell (FG)	John O'Connell (Ind.)
25th	1987	Frank Cluskey (Lab)	Ben Briscoe (FF)	Fergus O'Brien (FG)	Gay Mitchell (FG)	Mary Mooney (FF)
26th	1989	John O'Connell (FF)	Ben Briscoe (FF)	Fergus O'Brien (FG)	Gay Mitchell (FG)	Eric Byrne (WP)
27th	1992	John O'Connell (FF)	Ben Briscoe (FF)	Pat Upton (Lab)	Gay Mitchell (FG)	4 seats 1992–2002
27th	1994 by-election	Eric Byrne (DL)	Ben Briscoe (FF)	Pat Upton (Lab)	Gay Mitchell (FG)	4 seats 1992–2002
28th	1997	Seán Ardagh (FF)	Ben Briscoe (FF)	Pat Upton (Lab)	Gay Mitchell (FG)	4 seats 1992–2002
28th	1999 by-election	Seán Ardagh (FF)	Ben Briscoe (FF)	Mary Upton (Lab)	Gay Mitchell (FG)	4 seats 1992–2002
29th	2002	Seán Ardagh (FF)	Aengus Ó Snodaigh (SF)	Mary Upton (Lab)	Gay Mitchell (FG)	Michael Mulcahy (FF)
30th	2007	Seán Ardagh (FF)	Aengus Ó Snodaigh (SF)	Mary Upton (Lab)	Catherine Byrne (FG)	Michael Mulcahy (FF)
31st	2011	Eric Byrne (Lab)	Aengus Ó Snodaigh (SF)	Joan Collins (PBP)	Catherine Byrne (FG)	Michael Conaghan (Lab)
32nd	2016	Bríd Smith (AAA–PBP)	Aengus Ó Snodaigh (SF)	Joan Collins (Note: Founded Right to Change in May 2020.) (I4C)	Catherine Byrne (FG)	4 seats from 2016
33rd	2020	Bríd Smith (S–PBP)	Aengus Ó Snodaigh (SF)	Joan Collins (I4C)	Patrick Costello (GP)	4 seats from 2016
34th	2024	Catherine Ardagh (FF)	Aengus Ó Snodaigh (SF)	Máire Devine (SF)	Jen Cummins (SD)	4 seats from 2016
