= Mick Fitzpatrick =

Irish republican, communist (1893–1968)

Teachta Dála
- In office February 1948 – May 1951
- Constituency: Dublin North-West

Chief of Staff of the IRA
- In office 1937–1938
- Preceded by: Tom Barry
- Succeeded by: Seán Russell

Personal details
- Born: 1893 Kilkenny, Ireland
- Died: 8 October 1968 (aged 75) Dublin, Ireland
- Party: Clann na Poblachta
- Other political affiliations: Communist Party of Ireland

Military service
- Allegiance: Irish Republic
- Branch/service: Anti-Treaty IRA
- Rank: Officer commanding
- Commands: Dublin Brigade
- Battles/wars: Irish Civil War

Michael Fitzpatrick (1893 – 8 October 1968) was an Irish republican, Chief of Staff of the Irish Republican Army (IRA) and Clann na Poblachta politician.

== Biography ==
Born in Kilkenny in 1893, Fitzpatrick lived in Dublin and was described as "a man with the common touch and a good organizer." He was a leader in the anti-Treaty IRA in Dublin during the Irish Civil War. He was briefly the Officer commanding of the IRA's Dublin Brigade and was interned in 1923.

Fitzpatrick was a full-time official of the Grocers' trade union and secretary of its social club at the Banba Hall in Dublin's Parnell Square. He also managed the Balalaika Ballroom and restaurant in the same area.

== IRA leadership ==
He was the central figure in IRA contacts with the Soviet Union during the late 1920s and in 1927, he represented the IRA Army Council at the first International Congress of the Friends of Soviet Russia (FOSR) in Moscow where he was elected to the presidium of the FOSR. In 1928 he helped establish an Irish section of the FOSR. During 1929 he was involved in launching the Irish Labour Defence League and the Workers' Revolutionary Party of Ireland. He was also involved in Comhairle na Poblachta, a body set up the same year to heal the rift between the military and political anti-Treaty forces in Ireland. In 1931 Fitzpatrick was elected to the National Executive board of Saor Éire – a far-left political organisation established in September 1931 by communist-leaning members of the IRA. He visited the Soviet Union again in 1932.

Fitzpatrick chaired the 1933 IRA General Army Convention (GAC). At the 1934 GAC he disagreed with the call for a Republican Congress and remained within the IRA. His union was involved in a strike with O'Mara's Bacon Shops in late 1934 in which the IRA intervened violently. During 1935 he was involved in the IRA's intervention in the Dublin transport strike.

In 1936 he was appointed as the IRA Quartermaster General and joined Cumann Poblachta na hÉireann, a political party set up by the IRA. Fitzpatrick succeeded Tom Barry as Chief of Staff in 1937, only to be ousted by Seán Russell at the 1938 GAC.

He was involved in the 1946 launch of Clann na Poblachta. Fitzpatrick was a member of its national executive. At the 1948 general election, he was elected as a TD for Dublin North-West, winning 2,395 votes (10.3%). At the 1951 general election, he received 458 votes (1.9%) and lost his seat.

Mick Fitzpatrick died in 1968.

Dáil	Election	Deputy (Party)	Deputy (Party)	Deputy (Party)	Deputy (Party)
2nd	1921	Philip Cosgrave (SF)	Joseph McGrath (SF)	Richard Mulcahy (SF)	Michael Staines (SF)
3rd	1922	Philip Cosgrave (PT-SF)	Joseph McGrath (PT-SF)	Richard Mulcahy (PT-SF)	Michael Staines (PT-SF)
4th	1923	Constituency abolished. See Dublin North			

Dáil	Election	Deputy (Party)	Deputy (Party)	Deputy (Party)	Deputy (Party)	Deputy (Party)
9th	1937	Seán T. O'Kelly (FF)	A. P. Byrne (Ind.)	Cormac Breathnach (FF)	Patrick McGilligan (FG)	Archie Heron (Lab)
10th	1938	Seán T. O'Kelly (FF)	A. P. Byrne (Ind.)	Cormac Breathnach (FF)	Patrick McGilligan (FG)	Eamonn Cooney (FF)
11th	1943	Seán T. O'Kelly (FF)	A. P. Byrne (Ind.)	Cormac Breathnach (FF)	Patrick McGilligan (FG)	Martin O'Sullivan (Lab)
12th	1944	Seán T. O'Kelly (FF)	John S. O'Connor (FF)	Cormac Breathnach (FF)	Patrick McGilligan (FG)	Martin O'Sullivan (Lab)
12th	1945 by-election	Vivion de Valera (FF)	John S. O'Connor (FF)	Cormac Breathnach (FF)	Patrick McGilligan (FG)	Martin O'Sullivan (Lab)
13th	1948	Mick Fitzpatrick (CnaP)	A. P. Byrne (Ind.)	Cormac Breathnach (FF)	3 seats from 1948 to 1969	
14th	1951	Declan Costello (FG)	A. P. Byrne (Ind.)	Cormac Breathnach (FF)	3 seats from 1948 to 1969	
14th	1952 by-election	Declan Costello (FG)	Thomas Byrne (Ind.)	Cormac Breathnach (FF)	3 seats from 1948 to 1969	
15th	1954	Declan Costello (FG)	Thomas Byrne (Ind.)	Richard Gogan (FF)	3 seats from 1948 to 1969	
16th	1957	Declan Costello (FG)	Thomas Byrne (Ind.)	Richard Gogan (FF)	3 seats from 1948 to 1969	
17th	1961	Declan Costello (FG)	Michael Mullen (Lab)	Richard Gogan (FF)	3 seats from 1948 to 1969	
18th	1965	Declan Costello (FG)	Michael Mullen (Lab)	Richard Gogan (FF)	3 seats from 1948 to 1969	
19th	1969	Hugh Byrne (FG)	Jim Tunney (FF)	Richard Gogan (FF)	David Thornley (Lab)	4 seats from 1969 to 1977
20th	1973	Hugh Byrne (FG)	Jim Tunney (FF)	Richard Gogan (FF)	David Thornley (Lab)	4 seats from 1969 to 1977
21st	1977	Constituency abolished. See Dublin Finglas and Dublin Cabra				

Dáil	Election	Deputy (Party)	Deputy (Party)	Deputy (Party)	Deputy (Party)
22nd	1981	Jim Tunney (FF)	Michael Barrett (FF)	Mary Flaherty (FG)	Hugh Byrne (FG)
23rd	1982 (Feb)	Jim Tunney (FF)	Michael Barrett (FF)	Mary Flaherty (FG)	Proinsias De Rossa (WP)
24th	1982 (Nov)	Jim Tunney (FF)	Michael Barrett (FF)	Mary Flaherty (FG)	Proinsias De Rossa (WP)
25th	1987	Jim Tunney (FF)	Michael Barrett (FF)	Mary Flaherty (FG)	Proinsias De Rossa (WP)
26th	1989	Jim Tunney (FF)	Michael Barrett (FF)	Mary Flaherty (FG)	Proinsias De Rossa (WP)
27th	1992	Noel Ahern (FF)	Róisín Shortall (Lab)	Mary Flaherty (FG)	Proinsias De Rossa (DL)
28th	1997	Noel Ahern (FF)	Róisín Shortall (Lab)	Pat Carey (FF)	Proinsias De Rossa (DL)
29th	2002	Noel Ahern (FF)	Róisín Shortall (Lab)	Pat Carey (FF)	3 seats from 2002
30th	2007	Noel Ahern (FF)	Róisín Shortall (Lab)	Pat Carey (FF)	3 seats from 2002
31st	2011	Dessie Ellis (SF)	Róisín Shortall (Lab)	John Lyons (Lab)	3 seats from 2002
32nd	2016	Dessie Ellis (SF)	Róisín Shortall (SD)	Noel Rock (FG)	3 seats from 2002
33rd	2020	Dessie Ellis (SF)	Róisín Shortall (SD)	Paul McAuliffe (FF)	3 seats from 2002
34th	2024	Dessie Ellis (SF)	Rory Hearne (SD)	Paul McAuliffe (FF)	3 seats from 2002
