= Dooega =

Coordinates: 53°55′20″N 10°01′30″W

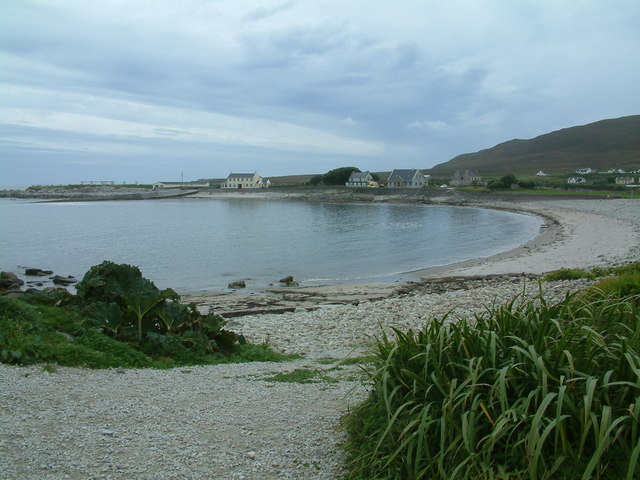
Camport Bay at Dooega on Achill Island

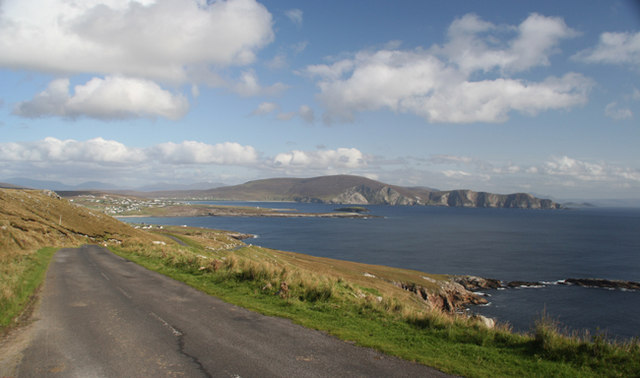
Looking towards the cliffs of Dooega Head from the coast road near Keem

Dumha Éige (anglicised: Dooega) is a village in the south west of Achill Island on the west coast of Ireland in County Mayo. It is in the Gaeltacht and is the home of Coláiste Acla. It once had a National School. The scenic area is part of the Achill Atlantic Drive. Dumha Éige/Dooega has a Blue Flag beach, a church, a pub and guesthouse.

== Public transport ==
=== Bus services ===
Bus Éireann route 440, Dooagh-Westport-Ireland West Airport, serves Dooega on Thursdays only providing one journey in each direction.

=== Rail access ===
The nearest rail services may be accessed at Westport railway station approximately 53 km distant. There are several trains a day from Westport to Dublin Heuston via Athlone.

== See also ==
- Dooagh
