= Frank Edwards (communist) =

Irish teacher and communist

Frank Edwards (1907–7 June 1983) was a teacher and prominent Irish communist.

Edwards's parents were Belfast Catholics who relocated to Waterford. His father served, and died, in the British Army during the First World War. His elder brother, Jack Edwards, was the Waterford organiser of the one-day general strike against the enforcement of conscription in Ireland. Jack was active in the Irish War of Independence and then joined the Anti-treaty side in the Irish Civil War. In Kilkenny Gaol, he was shot "trying to escape" as a reprisal for a Free State officer killed in Waterford. Frank Edwards said of the killing of his brother, "It was known to be a reprisal for the shooting of a Free State officer, Captain O'Brien, in Waterford." He trained as a national school teacher in De La Salle College, Waterford. While teaching at Mount Sion Christian Brothers School, Waterford, Frank Edwards became the Waterford leader of the Republican Congress in 1934. The Roman Catholic Church had denounced the Congress and advised against participation in its foundation meeting. When Edwards denounced local slum-landlords, not realising that some of the property was owned by the Catholic Church, this brought him to the notice of Archdeacon William Byrne. Edwards was investigated by the Church authorities, and Bishop Jeremiah Kinane ordered he leave his teaching post. Edwards was supported at first by his union, the Irish National Teachers' Organisation, and a national scandal ensued, but the Church stood firm, stating that the Congress had betrayed "The Republic" and sought to install "the Russian model".

In late 1936, Edwards went to Spain as a member of the Connolly Column, fought on the Front at Lopera (where only 66 of the 150 Irish engaged did not become casualties) and was wounded at Las Rozas on the Madrid Front.

With his wife Bobbie, Nora Harkin, John Swift and others, Edwards was one of the founders of the Ireland-USSR Society in 1966.

He returned to Ireland, where he was now blacklisted, lost a post with Pye Radio for organising a union, worked as a labourer laying pipes, and, at the outbreak of the Second World War, found a teaching post at Zion School, a Jewish foundation on the South Circular Road. He retired thirty years later from this "temporary" post, and died in 1983 after a long illness.
