= Saor Éire =

1931 political organisation

- Leader: Peadar O'Donnell
- Chairman: Seán Hayes
- Founded: September 1931
- Banned: October 1931
- Ideology: Irish republicanism Communism
- Political position: Far-left
- Colors: Red

Saor Éire (IPA: [ˌsˠeːɾˠ ˈeːɾʲə, ˌsˠiːɾˠ -]; lit. 'Free Ireland') was a far-left political organisation in the Irish Free State established in September 1931 by communist-leaning members of the Irish Republican Army, with the backing of the IRA leadership. Notable among its founders was Peadar O'Donnell, former editor of An Phoblacht and a leading far-left figure in the IRA. Saor Éire described itself as "an organisation of workers and working farmers".

It has been suggested that the support of the IRA chief of staff, Moss (Maurice) Twomey, was instrumental in the organisation's establishment. However, Tim Pat Coogan claimed that Twomey was doubtful about the organisation, worrying about involvement in electoral politics and possible communist influence.

During its short existence Saor Éire used the republican publication An Phoblacht, under the editorship of Frank Ryan between 1926 and 1933, to report on its progress and to promote its far-left republican views.

== History ==
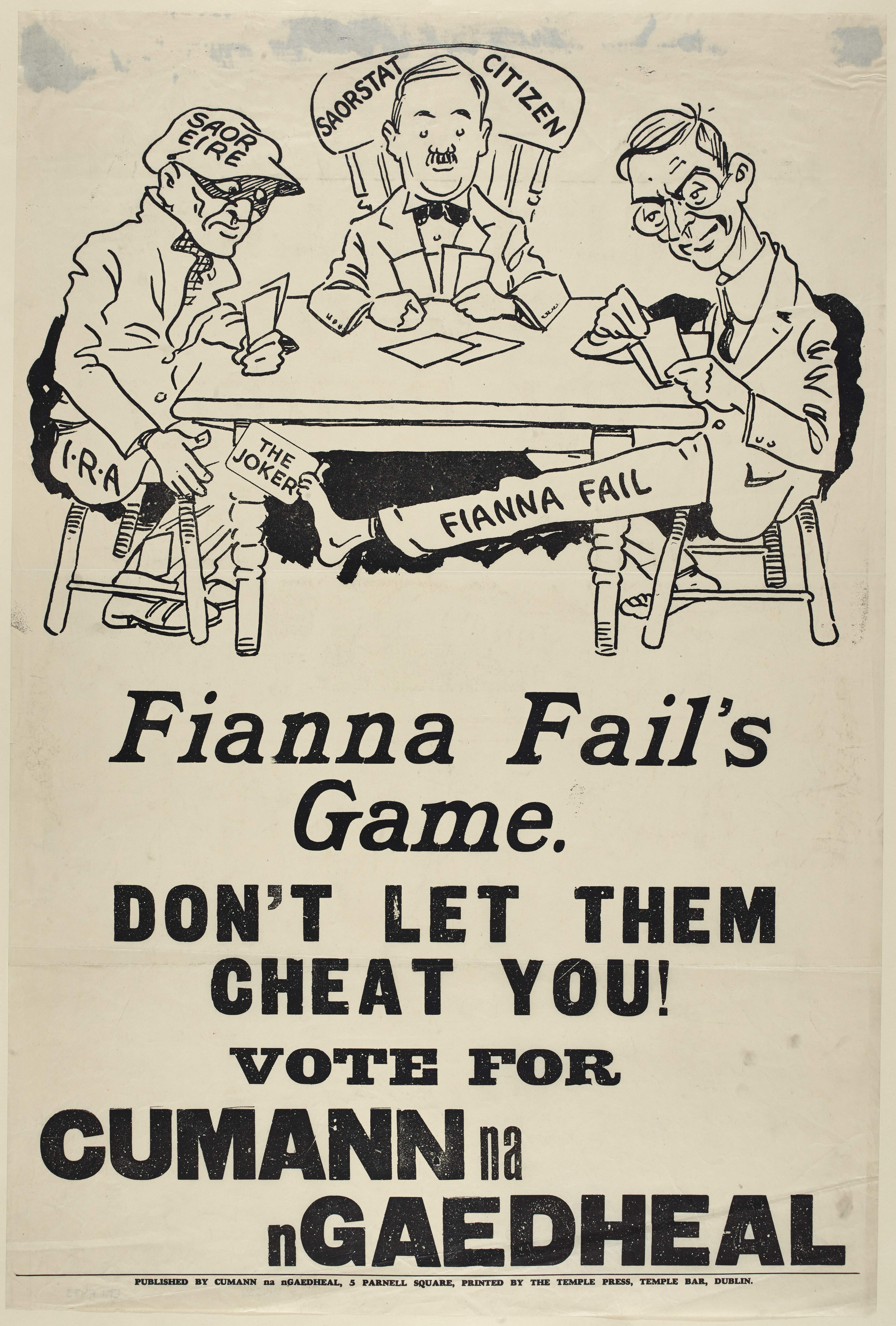
A poster likely from the 1932 Irish general election, in which Cumann na nGaedheal accuses Éamon de Valera and Fianna Fáil of being aligned with Saor Éire.

On the weekend of 26 to 27 September 1931, Saor Éire held its first conference in Dublin at Iona Hall. One hundred and fifty delegates from both the Irish Free State and Northern Ireland attended the conference against a background of police raids on the houses and offices connected with Saor Éire and An Phoblacht. Seán Hayes was chairman, while David Fitzgerald (Tipperary) acted as secretary.

The party was formed by a socialist faction of the IRA in the late 1920s and 30s used the writing of James Connolly and Liam Mellows as their ideological basis.

The conference elected an executive of Hayes, Fitzgerald, Sean McGuinness, May Laverty (Belfast), Helena Molony, Sheila Dowling, Sheila Humphreys, D. McGinley, Mick Fitzpatrick, Seán MacBride, Michael Price, Peadar O'Donnell, Mick Hallissey (Kerry), M. O'Donnell (Offaly), Patrick McCormack (Antrim), Tom Kenny (Galway), L. Brady (Laois), Nicholas Boran (Kilkenny), John Mulgrew (Mayo) and Tom Maguire (Westmeath). George Gilmore and Frank Ryan were also involved.

The constitution elaborated upon the aims by describing a two-phase programme. The first phase was described as being one of organisation and propagandising in order to organise a solid front for mass resistance to the oppressors. This would build upon the day-to-day resistance and activity towards "rents, annuities, evictions, seizures, bank sales, lock-outs, strikes and wage-cuts." This challenge, it was believed, would lead to power passing from the hands of the imperialists to the masses. The second phase was one of consolidation of power through the organisation of the economy and a workers' and working farmers' republic.

Ideologically Saor Éire adhered to the Irish socialist republicanism developed by James Connolly and Peadar O'Donnell. As a consequence of the heavy influence of O'Donnell, Saor Éire strongly advocated the revival of Gaelic culture and the involvement of the poorer rural working communities in any rise against the Irish capitalist institutions and British imperialism.

Sean McBride described the organisation at its launch like this:

Saor Eire had been founded to organise and consolidate the Republic of Ireland on the basis of the possession and administration by the workers and working farmers, of the land, instruments of production, distribution and exchange, and to restore and foster the Irish language and culture. The means by which theses objects could be achieved were by organising committees of action amongst the industrial and agricultural workers to lead the day-to-day struggle of the working class and working farmers and mobilise the mass of the Irish people behind a revolutionary government for the overthrow of British Imperialism in Ireland and the organisation of a Workers’ and Working Farmers' Republic.

The organisation was attacked by the centre-right press and the Catholic Church as a dangerous communist group. In October 1931, the Catholic Church in Ireland issued a pastoral letter condemning the Irish Republican Army, Saor Éire and other left-wing groups in Ireland, which they accused of being communist and atheist in nature. The letter stated that Saor Éire was a "frankly communistic organisation trying to impose upon the Catholic soil of Ireland the same materialistic regime, with its fanatic hatred of God, as now dominates Russia and threatens to dominate Spain". Another section of the letter stated: "You cannot be a Catholic and a Communist. One stands for Christ, the other for Anti-Christ".

Saor Eire was quickly thereafter banned by the Free State government.

The strength of reaction against Saor Eire prevented it from becoming an effective political organisation. Two years later, in 1933, O'Donnell and his supporters attempted a similar initiative with the establishment of the Republican Congress.

== Policies ==
The constitution listed the organisation's objectives as being:

1. To achieve an independent revolutionary leadership for the working class and working farmers towards the overthrow of British imperialism and its ally, Irish capitalism.
2. To organise and consolidate the Republic of Ireland on the basis of the possession and administration by the workers and working farmers, of the land, instruments of production, distribution, and exchange.
3. To restore and foster the Irish language, culture, and games.

== See also ==
- Republican Congress
- Connolly Column
