= George Gilmore =

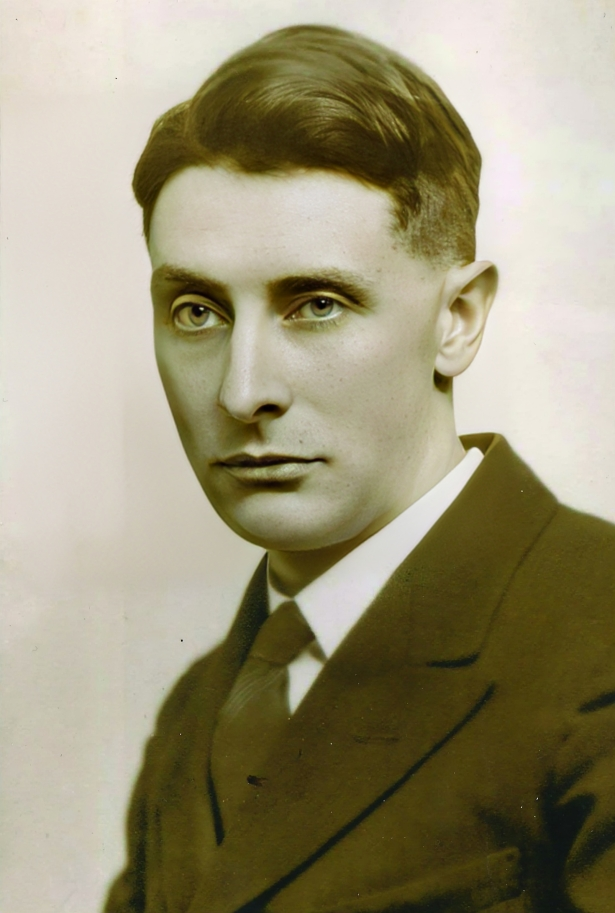

Personal details
- Born: 5 May 1898 County Dublin, Ireland
- Died: 29 June 1985 (aged 87)
- Party: Republican Congress

Military service
- Allegiance: Irish Republic
- Branch/service: Fianna Éireann; Irish Volunteers; Irish Republican Army; Anti-Treaty IRA
- Unit: South County Dublin Battalion of the IRA
- Battles/wars: Irish War of Independence; Irish Civil War (POW)

George Frederick Gilmore (5 May 1898 – 1985) was a Protestant Irish republican and communist who became an Irish Republican Army leader during the 1920s and 1930s. During his period of influence, Gilmore attempted to shift the IRA to the political left, but alongside Peadar O'Donnell and Frank Ryan he was expelled for his efforts. After leaving the IRA, Gilmore attempted to unite Irish republicanism under the banner of the Republican Congress, but ideological debates split the group apart. Afterwards, Gilmore removed himself from public life.

== Biography ==
=== Early life ===
Born at Hillside Terrace in Howth, County Dublin, he was the second son of Philip Gilmore, an accountant originally from County Antrim, and Fanny Angus. Despite his father primarily working for Unionist landlords, and being educated at home, George and his brothers Harry and Charlie all turned towards Irish Republicanism. By 1916 Gilmore had become a member of Fianna Éireann, the Republican boy scouts, and later a member of the South County Dublin battalion of the Irish Volunteers.

=== IRA activity ===
He fought in the Irish Republican Army in the Irish War of Independence and in the Irish Civil War on the Anti-Treaty IRA side. During the civil war Gilmore was captured and imprisoned, but he managed to escape custody in August 1923, the aftermath of which caused riots as the remaining prisoners were placed in solitary confinement.

Following the end of the civil war, Gilmore served as the secretary of future Taoiseach Seán Lemass, as well alongside Frank Aiken. During the early 1920s Lemass, Aiken and Gilmore regularly meet with the IRA army council to represent the emerging political leadership of Irish republicanism that would coalesce as Fianna Fáil in 1926. The trio regularly sat opposite IRA leaders Frank Ryan, Peadar O'Donnell, and Seán Russell.

=== Prison years ===
In October 1925 he and Lemass organised the escape of 19 IRA prisoners from Mountjoy Prison in Dublin. As part of the jailbreak, Gilmore impersonated a member of Garda Siochana. None of the 19 escapees were subsequently recaptured, and their escape served as a major propaganda coup. However, the next month, Gilmore was involved in a riot that took place on Armistice Day and he was subsequently arrested and sentenced to eighteen months in prison. Gilmore resisted the entire duration; first resisting the arrest and then, once imprisoned, refused to wear a prison uniform and went on hunger strike. Early in 1928 members of the IRA attacked Mountjoy Prison where Gilmore was held and shot the warden after a story emerged that Gilmore had previously been the victim of a vicious beating by the guards. Gilmore was released in 1929 but re-arrested and re-imprisoned almost immediately, resulting in a retaliatory beating by the guards that left Gilmore unconscious.

Sometime between 1929 and 1930, Gilmore was sent by the IRA to Russia to receive military training and to seek aid.

Gilmore was arrested yet again upon his return to Ireland in April 1931, charged with having resisted arrest ten months previously. In October tried to escape with the help of his brother Charlie and almost succeeded, using a plot involving mock pistols wrapped in silver to intimidate the guards. In the aftermath of the failed escape, his treatment in Arbour Hill prison from 1931-32 was abysmal. Gilmore once again refused to wear prison clothing because of his political status and remained naked in a windowless cell from October 1931 until February 1932. In June 1931 of a cache of weapons were discovered near Gilmore's home at Killakee in the Dublin mountains, which resulted in George and his brother Charlie being placed before a military tribunal which sentenced George to five years in prison and Charlie to three (in 1932 Fianna Fail came to power and the brothers were released). Neither recognised the authority of the court, with George stating "I do not want anybody to think I excuse myself for such a charge as having arms, I am admittedly hostile to British imperialism and international capitalism".

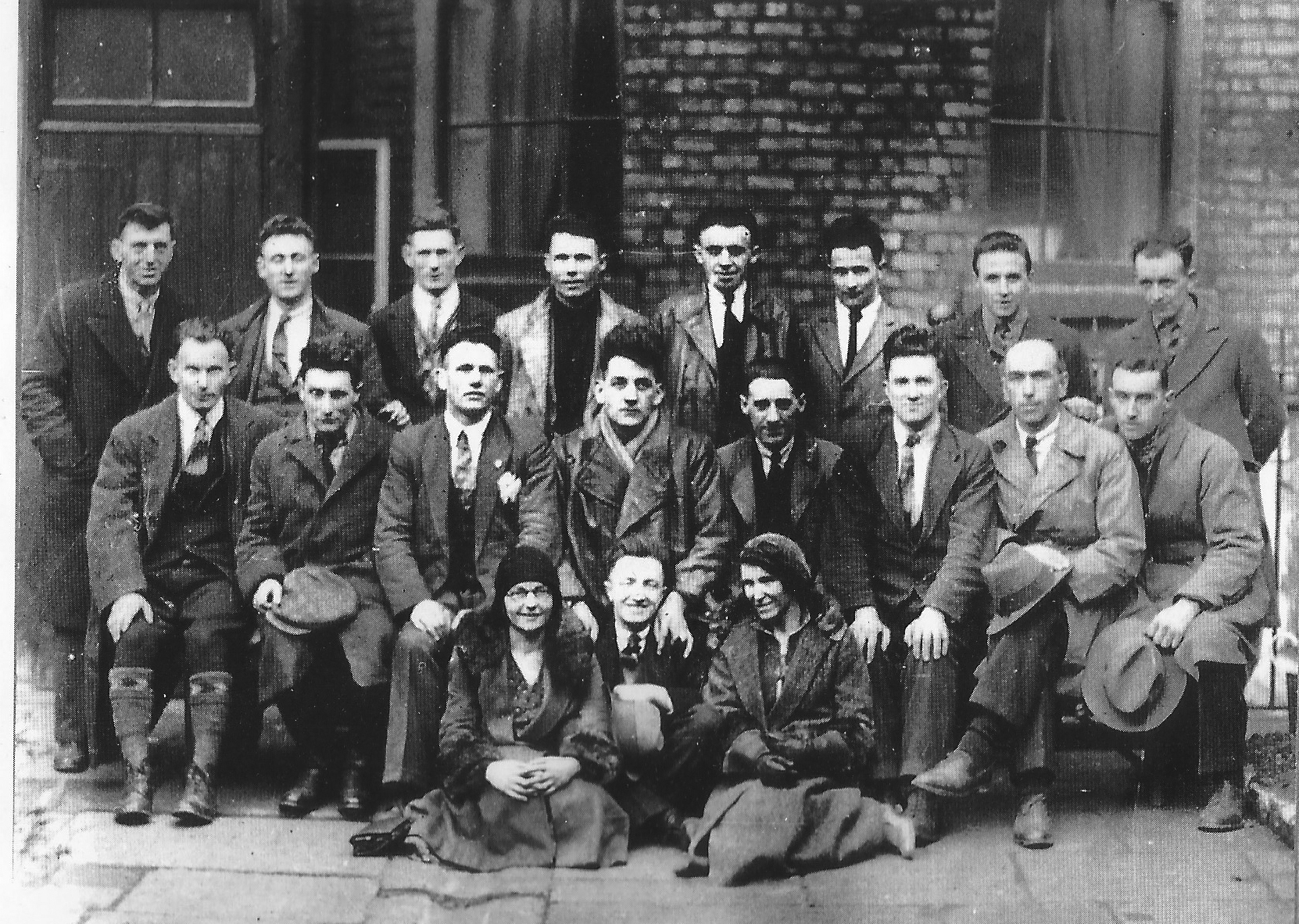
Gilmore can be seen on second left of the middle row in this group photograph taken in March 1932 of Irish republicans newly released from prison. Frank Ryan appears to be centre of the middle row.

Gilmore's fortunes were dramatically altered when Fianna Fáil emerged victorious in the February 1932 general election. In the aftermath Frank Aiken, former Chief of Staff of the IRA and new minister for defence went to see Gilmore on March 9 and on the next day all republican prisoners were released as part of a general amnesty. 30,000 supporters greeted the prisoners at College Green, Dublin.

=== Expulsion from the IRA and Republican Congress ===
Finally out of long-term imprisonment, Gilmore was eager to resume working towards a socialist Ireland. Gilmore had supported Peadar O'Donnell's shortlived socialist republican group Saor Éire from prison, but in the aftermath of its demise, he concluded that the group has spent too much time imagining what it might do if in government, and not enough time considering what the immediate aims of the IRA should be. With his close personal ties to their leadership, Gilmore had a positive view of Fianna Fáil, and at that point in time believed their goals differed little from his own and those of the IRA. Nevertheless, Gilmore encouraged the IRA to not become too closely associated with Fianna Fáil, fearing the IRA would become a subservient body. Gilmore himself had ascended to the IRA's army council upon his release, and in March 1932 was amongst representatives of the Army Council that liaised with de Valera about a possible partnership between the IRA and Fianna Fáil.

On 14 August 1932, he and fellow Irish Republican T.J. Ryan were beaten badly, shot and wounded by plain-clothes members the Garda Síochána (Criminal Investigation Department) in Kilrush, County Clare. This incident that was blamed on the police by an official Tribunal of Inquiry that reported one month later.

In March 1934 Gilmore, alongside Frank Ryan and Peadar O'Donnell, refused to continue on as members of the IRA executive as part of a deepening rift over the direction of the IRA. Left-wing members of the IRA such as Gilmore, Ryan and O'Donnell insisted that the IRA needed to tie their activity to social agitation in addition to their military aims, but this was a minority viewpoint, with the majority believing the IRA should have a "strictly military" outlook. The rift would ultimately spiral into Gilmore, Ryan and O'Donnell being "court-martialled" and expelled in April.

In the aftermath, Gilmore worked with Roddy Connolly, Nora Connolly O'Brien, Peadar O'Donnell to found the Republican Congress, a left-wing socialist Irish Republican group The group broke up in 1935 over internal differences; Gilmore, Ryan and O'Donnell believed that the Republican Congress should be a "United Front", an alliance of all Republican groups in Ireland. Roddy Connolly and other members of the Communist Party of Ireland believed that the Congress should be a Vanguard Party. A conference was held by the Republican Congress in Rathmines, Dublin in September 1934 to vote on the issue. Before the vote was taken, Gilmore gave a speech in which he accused Fianna Fáil of using republicanism as means to promote Irish capitalism. When the votes were taken on whether the Republican Congress should be a united front or a vanguard party, Gilmore's united front faction won. However, supporters of the vanguard party concept such as Roddy Connolly immediately resigned from the Congress in protest and walked out on the group. It proved to be a blow that the Congress would never recover from and the group was defunct by 1936. Gilmore had made a last-ditch effort to save the Congress by travelling to America to seek funds from Irish-American groups but was not successful.

Upon the outbreak of the Spanish Civil War in July 1936, Gilmore and O'Donnell became supporters of the International Brigades. Both men travelled to Spain personally, during which they were involved in a plane crash in which Gilmore's leg was broken.

Following the outbreak of World War II in September 1939 Gilmore wrote an appeal pleading with the IRA to dump arms until the war in Europe was over and denounced them for flirting with fascism by seeking aid from Germany.

During the 1960s when the Republican Movement once again moved to the left Gilmore and O'Donnell were once again in demand as speakers and as writers in Republican publications. In 1966, for the 50th anniversary of the Easter Rising, Gilmore released a pamphlet entitled "Labour and the republican movement" in which he espoused the principles of James Connolly. Additionally, Gilmore appealed to young republicans not to repeat the mistake older republicans had made in being too rigid in their views and too short on policy.

He died in Howth, County Dublin, aged 87.

== Personal life ==
In the mid-1930s, Gilmore met Cora Hughes, a graduate of Celtic Studies from University College Dublin who had begun to move in left-wing circles and who had become a housing activist in the city. Cora was the daughter of Frank Hughes, the best man at Éamon de Valera's wedding. De Valera was her godfather and continued to support her throughout her life. Cora's association with leftwing politics and Gilmore caused a deep rift between herself and her deeply religious family. Hughes and Gilmore were eventually engaged to be married when it became apparent that Hughes was suffering from Tuberculous, which Gilmore believed she developed visiting and working in the slums of Dublin. Gilmore believed that Hughes need to immediately depart for a sanatorium in Switzerland but Hughes' family believed she should go to Lourdes to seek a miracle. In desperation, Gilmore arranged a meeting with De Valera to ask him to convince the Hughes family to send her to Switzerland. De Valera reluctantly agreed to Gilmore's request and spoke to the family, as well as arranging for Hughes to be issued an emergency passport. However, the outbreak of World War 2 complicated matters, and unfortunately Cora died soon thereafter. Gilmore never married.

== Literature ==
- J. Bowyer Bell, The Secret Army: The IRA 1916-1979 (revised & updated edition), The Academy Press, Dublin 1979. ISBN 0-906187-27-3
- George Gilmore, The Irish Republican Congress, The Cork Workers' Club, Cork 1978.
- Mike Milotte, Communism in Modern Ireland: The Pursuit of the Workers' Republic since 1916, Gill & Macmillan, Dublin 1984. ISBN 0-7171-0946-1
