= Frank Ryan (Irish republican) =

Irish republican (1902–1944)

Francis Ryan
- Ryan, circa 1930s
- Born: 11 September 1902; Bottomstown, County Limerick, Ireland
- Died: 10 June 1944 (aged 41); Loschwitz, Dresden, Saxony, Nazi Germany
- Military career
- Allegiance: Irish Republic; Second Spanish Republic
- Branch: Anti-Treaty IRA; International Brigades
- Nickname: Frank Ryan
- Conflicts: Irish Civil War; Spanish Civil War; World War II

Frank Ryan (Irish: Proinsias Ó Riain; 11 September 1902 – 10 June 1944) was an Irish politician, journalist and soldier. He first came to prominence as an Irish republican activist at University College Dublin and fought for the Irish Republican Army during the Irish Civil War. Ryan fell under the influence of Peadar O'Donnell, an advocate of socialism within Irish republicanism, which resulted in him breaking with the IRA and becoming involved with founding a new political organisation, the Republican Congress, and editing its associated newspaper, An Phoblacht.

Ryan led the Irish brigade in the Spanish Civil War on the Popular Front side, fighting for the International Brigades (retroactively known as the Connolly Column). After being captured by pro-Nationalist Italians, he was sentenced to death, later changed to 30 years but after an international campaign, Ryan was released from prison in 1940 with the help of German authorities. Ryan would subsequently spend the next three years in Nazi Germany, During his time there, Ryan was in poor health and after a failed attempt to return to Ireland on a U-boat he died of pneumonia aged 41. In 1979 the Irish government was eventually successful in repatriating his remains and he was buried in Glasnevin cemetery.

== Early life ==
Ryan was born in the townland of Bottomstown near Elton, County Limerick. His parents, Vere Foster Ryan and Annie Slattery, were National School teachers at Bottomstown (parish of Knockainey) with a taste for Irish traditional music, and they lived in a house full of books. He attended St. Colman's College, Fermoy. From then on he was devoted to the restoration of the Irish language.

He studied Celtic Studies at University College Dublin, where he was a member of the Irish Republican Army (IRA) training corps. He left before graduating to join the IRA's East Limerick Brigade in 1922. He fought on the Anti-Treaty side in the Irish Civil War, and was wounded and interned. In November 1923 he was released and returned to University College Dublin. He was active in several Irish-language societies, winning the Cumann Gaedhealach's gold medal for oratory in Irish in 1924. During the Gaelic Revival era, he was commissioned to write for Irish-language publications – he briefly edited An Reult (Irish: The Star). He formed the University Republican Club and led it on demonstrations before graduation in 1925.

After university, he taught Irish at Mountjoy School (a Protestant school in Dublin), but journalism was his vocation. His day job was editing Irish Travel for the Tourist Board, while he also edited An tÓglach (Irish: The Volunteer) for the IRA. Evenings were devoted to teaching Irish at Conradh na Gaeilge, lecturing in history and literature, and leading the occasional céilidh.

In 1926, he was appointed adjutant of the Dublin Brigade and given the job of reorganisation. Ryan was always an anti-imperialist, and Peadar O'Donnell believes the biggest influence on Ryan's thinking in those days was the Congress of the League against Imperialism in Brussels, which he attended with Domhnall O'Donoghue, both as delegates of the IRA, in February 1927.

In 1929, Ryan was appointed editor of the Republican newspaper An Phoblacht, where he worked alongside Geoffrey Coulter, his assistant. Together they turned it into a lively political paper, boosting the readership substantially. In this year he was elected to the Army Executive, a body one below the IRA Army Council.

Starting in 1928 and lasting until the mid-1930s, Ryan would enter into a romantic relationship with Rosamond "Róisín" Jacob, a fellow Republican and socialist. The pair met through Ryan's Irish language classes. Because of a number of factors, such as the age difference between the two (she was 40 and he was 26 when they met, at a time when the norm in Ireland was that women should be younger than their partners), their different religious backgrounds (Ryan was nominally a Catholic, Jacob nominally a Quaker) and the fact that they were unwed, the relationship was considered "an affair" and they believed that it had to be kept a secret.

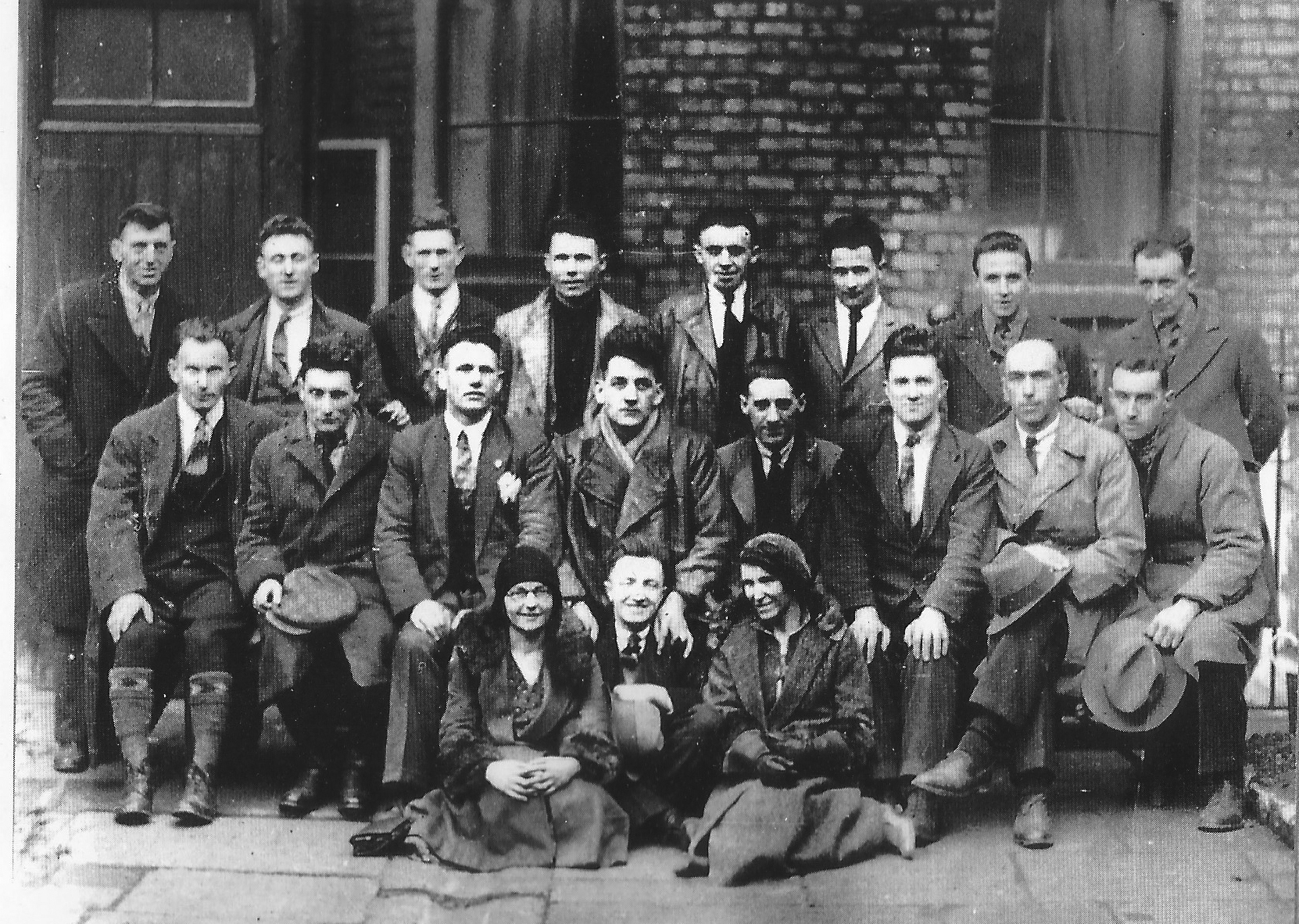
Ryan appears to be centre of the middle row of this photograph from March 1932 of republican prisoners newly released from prison. George Gilmore is on the second left of the middle row.

In May 1930, Ryan spent several weeks in the US, addressing Irish conventions, where he witnessed the start of the Great Depression, and the ravages of unemployment. In 1931, he was imprisoned for publishing seditious articles in An Phoblacht. Later that year, he was again imprisoned for contempt of court. Following the victory of Fianna Fáil in the 1932 Irish general election, Ryan was released from prison in March 1932 alongside thousands of other republican prisoners as part of a general amnesty.

== Republican Congress ==
In 1933, Ryan, along with George Gilmore and Peadar O'Donnell, proposed the establishment of a new left-republican organisation to be called the Republican Congress. This would form the basis of a mass revolutionary movement appealing to the working class and small farmers. At an IRA Army Convention, they narrowly failed to gain approval for the proposal. When Ryan, Gilmore and O'Donnell held a meeting in Athlone that April that continued to push for the creation of the Congress, the IRA Army Council subsequently "court marshalled" all three of them, while IRA volunteers who supported the Congress were stood down. In the aftermath, Gilmore, Ryan and O'Donnell pressed ahead with the Republican Congress, founding the organisation at another meeting in Athlone in April 1934, with Ryan becoming editor of its eponymous newspaper. Ryan's close friend was the poet, Irish republican and left-wing political activist Charlie Donnelly who had formed a Republican Congress branch in London. Donnelly sent articles concerning the situation in Britain for publication in the Irish Congress newspaper.

For months arguments raged both within the IRA and between the IRA and various left-wing organisations on how to deal with Government pressure, the growing Fascist tendency of Fine Gael, and whether to participate in elections. The IRA leadership managed to keep to its traditional path, though it did actively confront the Blueshirts. In 1935, Ryan established two publishing concerns, the Cooperative Press and Liberty Press, to circumvent the difficulties in publishing left-wing material. During strikes in the first half of that year (butchers' shops in January, a tram and bus strike in March) and agitations for the release of IRA prisoners which was still torn between a left-wing and a conservative faction and under tremendous pressure from the Government. Meanwhile, the Republican Congress began to split apart over ideological disputes. Ryan, Gilmore and O'Donnell believed that the Congress should be united front that served as a banner for all Irish Republicans while another faction featuring the likes of Roddy Connolly and members of the Communist Party of Ireland believed it should be a vanguard party. At a disastrous meeting of the Congress held in Rathmines, Dublin in September 1934 a vote was taken on the issue in which the United Front concept won out, but immediately those favouring a vanguard party stood up, resigned en masse and walked out of the party, a blow from which it never truly recovered, leading it to become defunct by 1936.

== Involvement in the Spanish Civil War of 1936–1939 ==
With the outbreak of the Spanish Civil War, Peadar O'Donnell and then George Gilmore went to Spain on behalf of the Congress to report on proceedings, and returned enthusiastic supporters of the Spanish Republicans. Ryan was incensed at quasi-Fascist Blueshirt leader Eoin O'Duffy organising an Irish Brigade to fight alongside the Fascists, and in open letters to the papers criticised Cardinal McRory for raising funds at church collections to support Franco. Cardinal McRory publicly suggested that the State should suppress the Republican Congress. On 22 September 1936 Ryan replied to that suggestion:"...may I assure your Eminence that as a Catholic I will take my religion from Rome, but as an Irish Republican, I will take my politics from neither Moscow nor Maynooth." (Maynooth is the seat of the Irish Catholic Bishops' Conference). The Congress started publicising the Spanish Republican cause in public meetings. This was no easy task, given the strength of pro-Franco feeling at the time, which was whipped up by sections of the Catholic Church and the Irish Independent. Pro-Republican meetings were frequently challenged, and on one occasion Ryan had to climb up a lamp-post to escape from a crowd which attacked a meeting he was addressing in York Street, Dublin.

Neither O'Donnell (due to his age) nor Gilmore (due to a broken leg) were in a position to return to Spain to fight. Despite his deafness, in late 1936 Ryan travelled to Spain with about 80 men, including Dubliner Tommy Wood, who was 17. He had succeeded in recruiting to fight in the International Brigades on the Republican side. Ryan's men are sometimes referred to as the "Connolly Column".

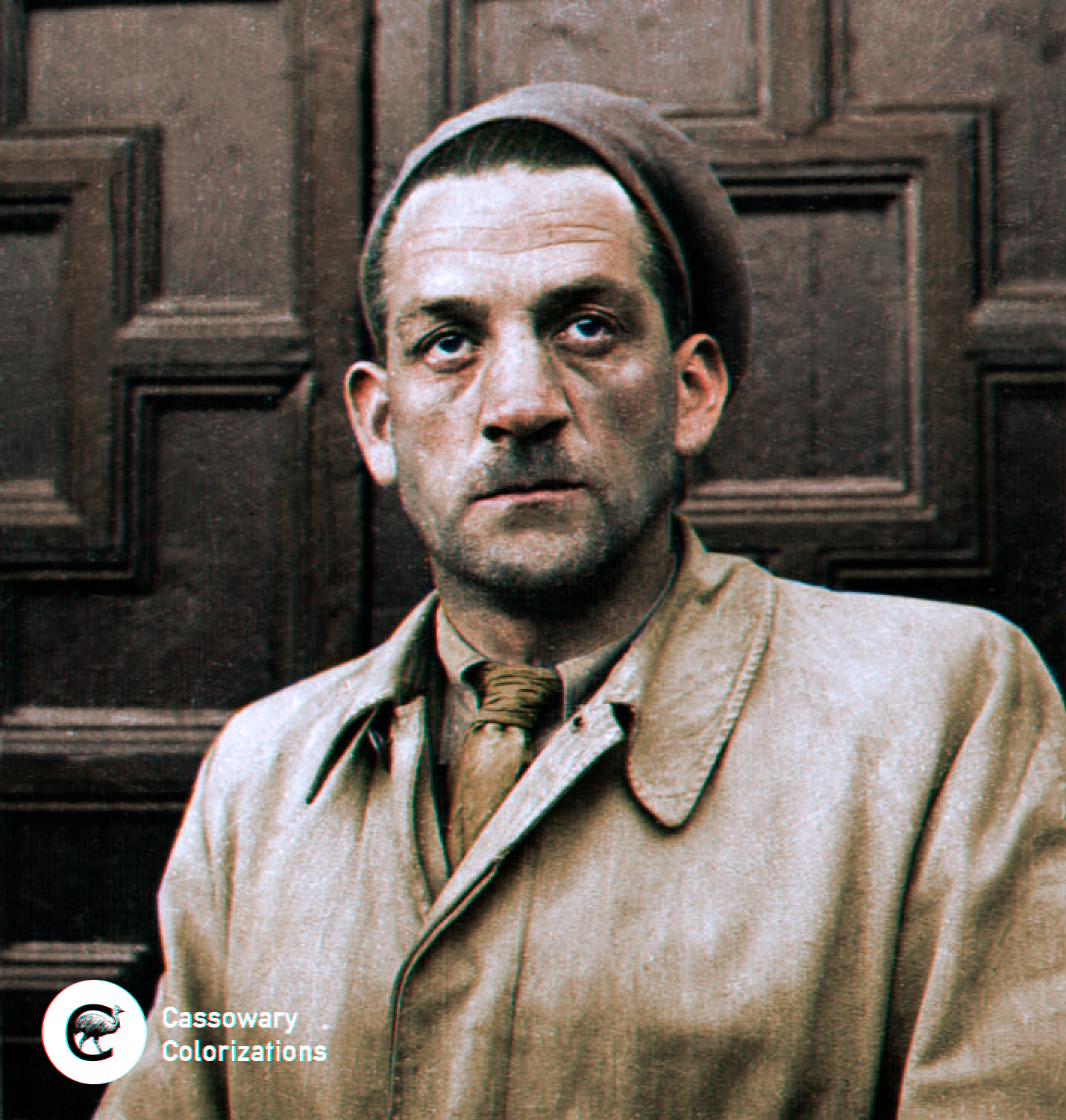
Ryan in Spain in 1938

He served in the Lincoln-Washington Brigade, rising to the rank of Brigadier. He was attached to the staff of the XV International Brigade in charge of publicity: writing, broadcasting and visiting the front line to see conditions first-hand. Ryan fought in a number of engagements, he was wounded at the Battle of Jarama (12 February 1937) and he took over command of the British Battalion (the Irish were split between this and the Lincoln Battalion) after it suffered heavy losses. He was seriously wounded in March 1937, and returned to Ireland to recover. He took advantage of his return to launch another left-republican newspaper, entitled The Irish Democrat. On his return to Spain, he again served in the war until he was captured in Calaceite in March 1938 by Italian troops fighting for the Nationalists. He was accused of murder, court-martialled, and sentenced to death before being incarcerated in Burgos Prison in 1938. While imprisoned under harsh conditions in Burgos, Ryan refused to sing the Nationalist anthem or give the fascist salute. He was under the death sentence for 16 months. During this time he expressed his disagreement with the IRA bombing campaign in England. His sentence was later commuted to 30 years hard labour in January 1940.

=== 'Escape' from Burgos Prison in 1940 ===
In October 1938 Ryan was visited in Burgos Prison by the Irish Minister to Spain, Leopold Kerney.

Kerney hired a lawyer for Ryan (Jaime Michel de Champourcin, paid for by the Irish government) but, in spite of all his efforts, he could not secure Ryan's release. It was de Champourcin's contacts with Abwehr (a German military intelligence organisation) chief Wilhelm Canaris, and within the Franco Government, that saw Ryan released into Abwehr hands on 15 July 1940. The handover took place on the France-Spain border at Irun-Hendaye. A cover story that Ryan had "escaped" was released at the time. Ryan was taken to the border by Madrid-based Abwehr agent Wolfgang Blaum and handed over to Sonderführer Kurt Haller. From the border, Ryan was first taken to the resort town of Biarritz and then on to Paris where he received several days' hospitality courtesy of the Abwehr. He was then transported to Berlin, where he met up with Seán Russell on 4 August 1940.

== Time spent in Nazi Germany ==
=== IRA relations with Germany ===
On his arrival in Berlin, Ryan was introduced to SS Colonel Edmund Veesenmayer. Veesenmayer, as part of his roving SS and German Foreign Ministry brief, was intimately involved in the planning of all Abwehr operations in Ireland during 1940 – 1943, particularly those involving Russell and a mission code-named Operation Dove. When Russell became ill and died during the journey (of a perforated ulcer), the mission was subsequently aborted and Ryan returned to Germany via Bordeaux.

After the failure of Operation Dove, Ryan remained in Berlin. Between Autumn 1940 and January 1943 he lived in a "large gloomy flat" in Berlin with an acquaintance from Ireland, Helmut Clissman. Clissmann was married to Elizabeth "Budge" Mulcahy of County Sligo, a friend of both Ryan and Leopold Kerney. As an exchange student in Dublin in the 1930s Clissmann had known Ryan and other republicans and socialists well; before Hitler came to power, he had been a member of a left-wing student organisation. Ryan was not in good health as a result of his wound and treatment in the Spanish prison, and at one stage he had a stroke, but he remained convivial and drew around him a small circle of friends. He had to remain incognito and in general did not discuss politics. He grew increasingly deaf (though his friends suggested that he sometimes feigned deafness to avoid uncomfortable conversations with the German authorities) so that he could not be left alone at night – he could not hear the anti-aircraft sirens. He later had to spend his days outdoors or in cafés (where he became friendly with Francis Stuart, whom he had known from Dublin) so that people could see him if the sirens sounded. He took Irish newspapers to Stuart and, being in a position to get extra rations, shared them generously with his friends. In return, Stuart took Ryan, who had a lot of time on his hands, on trips to the countryside and on outings with his students. Stephen Hayes, Chief of Staff of the IRA, claimed that Ryan and Stuart were carrying out propaganda work among Irish prisoners of war, but that claim is disputed. Ryan and Stuart visited a camp for Irish prisoners, who signified their intent of joining an "Irish Guard". Ryan and Clissmann also visited a camp containing some men who intended setting up this Guard. Ryan had nothing to do with this and the scheme came to nothing. Ryan regretted visiting the camp and told Stuart that the whole scheme disheartened him; he only had sympathy with men who were, like he and his comrades had been, in prison camps.

Around the end of 1940, a "Where is Frank Ryan?" campaign began in the Irish Press. In response, Frank Ryan wrote a letter to Leopold Kerney, Irish Minister in Madrid, explaining his whereabouts. The Government of Éire was made aware of Ryan's whereabouts between 11 and 19 December 1940 by Elizabeth "Budge" Clissmann, who hand-delivered the letter on Ryan's behalf. Ryan instructed Clissmann not to tell Kerney that Russell had died on board U-65, although this information appears to have already been leaked.

=== Spying in Occupied Europe ===
In May 1941, Abwehr's Operation Whale ("Unternehmen Walfisch" in German), a plan to land a seaplane on a lake in Ireland, was expanded to include resupply of the IRA with money and a transmitter. Ryan was to contact the IRA. After changes to the plan it became known as Operation Sea Eagle ("Unternehmen Seeadler" in German). Ryan was asked for his co-operation in the planning for Operation Sea Eagle. The written proposal for Operation Sea Eagle gives some supposedly biographical details for Ryan composed by Veesenmayer. It is not known whether Ryan led Veesenmayer to include these statements in the proposal or whether Veesenmayer added them to increase the chances of Operation Sea Eagle being sponsored; either way Veesenmayer did not stress Ryan's Communist sympathies and included a number of inaccuracies and embellishments:

"... he is one of the leading Irish nationalists [and] has been for many years a member of the leader's council of the Irish Republican Army, and a participant in numerous fights against England."

"In 1929 the [British] Secret Service carried out an unsuccessful assassination attempt against him and he has often been in jail since."

"He has extensive connections with the Irish republican circles up to de Valera's closest entourage and with de Valera himself, as well as to the Irish regular army, the nationalist Irishmen in Northern Ireland and especially the leading Irishmen in America."

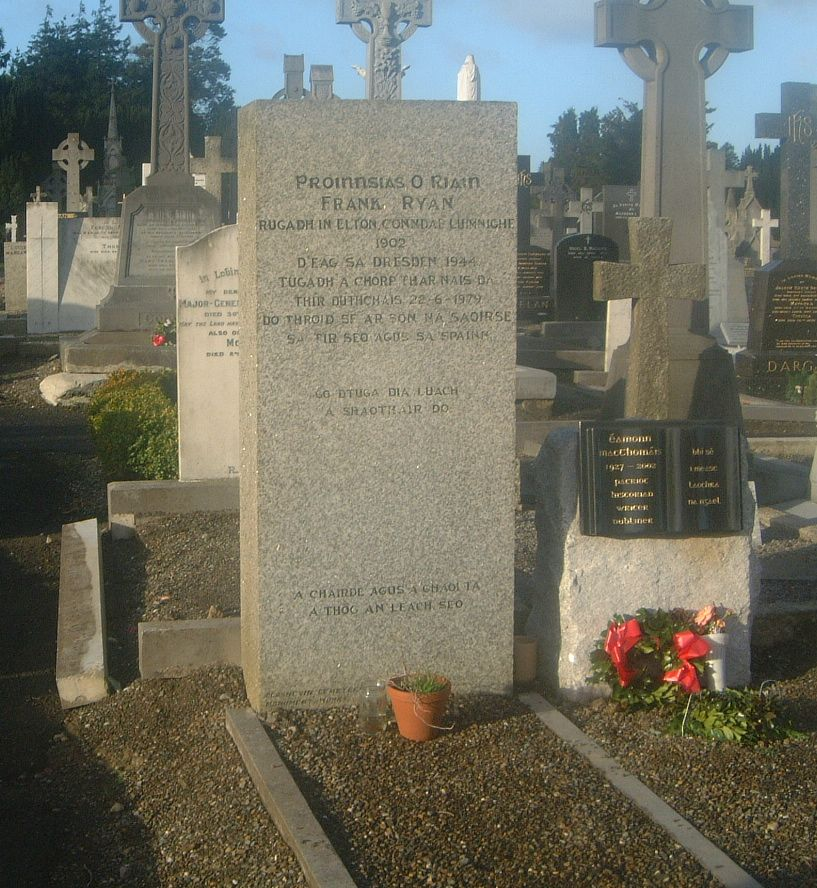
Frank Ryan's grave in Glasnevin Cemetery, Dublin.

Although Operation Sea Eagle was first postponed after being shown to Hitler on 6 September 1941 and then ultimately cancelled, Ryan's part in planning is unsubstantiated. A few weeks later O'Reilly was arrested by the FBI (they were looking for Sean Russell). They said they were aware of Ryan's "anti-Fascist credentials" and although due to his contacts and knowledge of languages would be useful to "the enemy", they did not believe he would ever work for Fascism.

According to left-wing IRA man Seán Cronin (citing Francis Stuart and the Clissmanns), Ryan did not change his political views after his release from the Spanish prison. According to the Clissmanns, he remained "an Irish Republican and a Connolly Socialist" all his life. However he was frustrated because he could do nothing for Ireland. After the Summer of 1941 he was concerned with defending Ireland's neutrality and he sided with De Valera on that point. There was also the shortage of arms in Ireland to defend itself – Churchill had prevented any supplies of arms to the Republic because Ireland would not give up the ports, and the Americans would not contravene the embargo. Churchill had also hinted at an invasion of the south of Ireland should it be required – there was a lot for all concerned to ponder about in those troubled times.

In 1941, Ryan wrote a number of letters to Irish Minister Leopold Kerney in Madrid. The Germans facilitated this to monitor events in Ireland and understand Ryan's position, as after the invasion of the Soviet Union the need to keep Ireland neutral grew, and Ryan was becoming increasingly important in their eyes (ironically, this invasion made Ryan even more opposed to German intentions). In most, if not all, of these letters he expressed his desire to return to Ireland. In November 1941 he wrote:

There might also be a situation (I was always a pessimist) in which I might be asked to do something I don't like. Such a situation is – soberly speaking – highly improbable. But if the unlikely were ever to happen...I won't do the dirty. And when you plant my tombstone, let it be of granite (like my stubborn cranium) contents. (Not for nothing did I earn the nickname of "The Mule" in my schooldays!)

Once a feared invasion of Éire by US troops stationed in Northern Ireland in 1942 failed to materialise, Ryan was dropped as a possible mission specialist in further covert Abwehr and Foreign Ministry plans and operations. He was approached late 1943 for his opinion on the feasibility of a "Geheimsender" (secret transmitter) propaganda operation in Ireland for broadcast to the United States, but the plan never reached fruition. It is also known that he discussed Francis Stuart's radio broadcasts with him prior to their commencement.

He died in June 1944 at a hospital in Loschwitz in Dresden. Elizabeth "Budge" Clissman attended his funeral in Dresden. and Francis Stuart. Clissmann eventually forwarded details of Ryan's fate to Leopold Kerney in Madrid. According to Stuart and Clissmann, the cause of death was pleurisy and pneumonia.

== Funeral ==
In 1963, historian Enno Stephan located Ryan's grave in Dresden, German Democratic Republic. Three volunteers of the International Brigades, Frank Edwards, Peter O'Connor and Michael O'Riordan travelled to East Germany as a guard of honour to repatriate Ryan's remains in 1979. On 21 June his remains arrived in Whitefriar Street church – his local church when he was in Dublin. The church was packed with all shades of Republican and left-wing opinion, as well as those from his past such as the Stuarts, Elizabeth "Budge" and Helmut Clissmann, Peadar O'Donnell (who spoke at the service), George Gilmore, and ex-comrades and sympathizers from all over the world. The cortege on its way to Glasnevin Cemetery halted at the GPO in memory of the dead of 1916. His coffin was borne to the grave in Glasnevin Cemetery by Irish veterans of the Spanish Civil War, Frank Edwards, Peter O'Connor, Michael O'Riordan and Terry Flanagan. Con Lehane delivered the funeral oration while an uilleann piper (Peter Browne) played "Limerick's Lamentation". He is buried next to Eamonn MacThomais.

== In popular culture ==
- Irish singer Christy Moore's song "Viva la Quinta Brigada" is in large part a tribute to Frank Ryan and his efforts in the Spanish Civil War.
- Frank Ryan gets a mention in the Pogues song "The Sick Bed of Cúchulainn", on their 1985 album Rum Sodomy & the Lash. The lines reference Ryan's Irishness, Internationalism and anti-Fascism. "Frank Ryan bought you whiskey in a brothel in Madrid... and you decked some fucking blackshirt who was cursing all the Yids."
- The character Liam Devlin in the Jack Higgins 1975 thriller The Eagle Has Landed seems to be based on Frank Ryan. Higgins's Devlin, like Ryan, is an IRA man who has fought on the Republican side in Spain, was captured and was afterwards passed on to the Germans – but in the book he is then recruited to join a (fictional) commando raid into England, aimed at capturing Winston Churchill.
- The Irish band Cruachan mentions Frank Ryan in their song "The Column" from the album Blood on the Black Robe.
- The docudrama 'The Enigma of Frank Ryan' (2012) depicting Ryan's final years in Germany with flashbacks to episodes of his earlier life in Ireland and Spain premiered at the Dublin Film Festival on 18 February 2012. The full screenplay of the film is published on the website of Queen's University Belfast.
- Frank Ryan appears as a character in 1940's Berlin in the novel Béal na Péiste by Fionntán de Brún.
- Frank Ryan was the historical basis for the character Frank Pike in Peter Mann's World War Two Berlin spy novel The Torqued Man (2022)
- Frank Ryan appears as a major character in Michael Russell’s novel The Dead City (2024).

== Sources and further information ==
- Cronin, Sean, Frank Ryan, The Search for the Republic, Repsol: Dublin, 1980 ISBN 0-86064-018-3
- Frank Ryan, McGarry, Fearghal, (2002), Historical Association of Ireland, Life and Times No 17, Dundalgan Press Ltd, ISBN 0-85221-143-0
- The IRA, Tim Pat Coogan, Fontana, 1971.
- In Green and Red: The Lives of Frank Ryan, Adrian Hoar, Kerry: Brandon. 2004. ISBN 0-86322-332-X.
- Connolly Column: The story of the Irishmen who fought for the Spanish Republic 1936–1939, Michael O'Riordan, Torfaen: Warren & Pell. 2005 (2nd edition). ISBN 0-9548904-2-6.
- Irish Secrets. German Espionage in Ireland 1939–1945, Mark M. Hull 2003 ISBN 0-7165-2756-1
- Spies in Ireland, Enno Stephan 1963 ISBN 1-131-82692-2 (reprint)
- Major Frank Ryan: Some recollections of conversations with him during our internment at De Burgos Penitentiary and suggestions as to how he escaped and later died in Germany Written by Welsh vol. Tom Jones in 1975.
- The Shamrock and the Swastika Carolle J. Carter 1977 ISBN 0-87015-221-1
- "Hitler's Useful Idiot", IndyMedia.ie 2 January 2005
- Ireland and the Spanish Civil War
- "Frank Ryan – patriot or collaborator". Review by Manus O'Riordan of a recent book on Ryan. Linked to several other reviews.
- New web site about L Kerney and WW2 – site reviewed by Manus O'Riordan.
- Leopold H. Kerney Website

== See also ==
- Irish Socialist Volunteers in the Spanish Civil War
- IRA Abwehr World War II – Main article on IRA Nazi links
- Friesack Camp
- Helmut Clissmann - Spouse of Elizabeth "Budge" Clissmann
- John Codd
- Liam Devlin – Fictional character inspired by Frank Ryan.
