= Peadar O'Donnell =

Irish republican and writer (1893–1986)

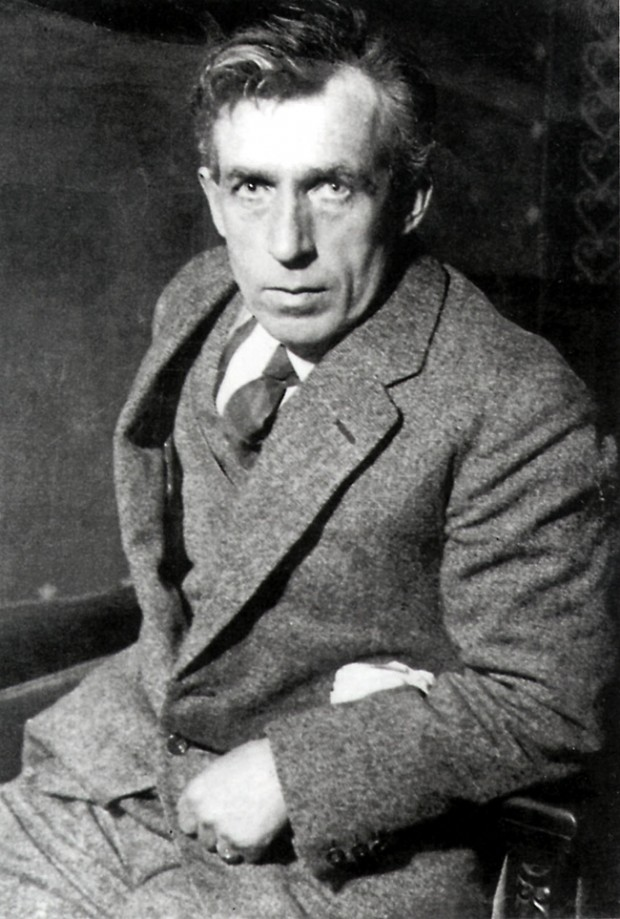
- O'Donnell, c. 1930

Teachta Dála
- In office August 1923 – June 1927
- Constituency: Donegal

Personal details
- Born: 22 February 1893 Dungloe, County Donegal, Ireland
- Died: 13 May 1986 (aged 93) Dublin, Ireland
- Spouse: Lile O'Donel (m. 1924; died 1969)

Military service
- Allegiance: Irish Republic
- Branch/service: Irish Republican Army; Anti-Treaty IRA
- Rank: Colonel commandant
- Commands: Commander of the 2nd Northern Division
- Battles/wars: Irish War of Independence; Irish Civil War; Battle of Dublin

Peadar O'Donnell (Irish: Peadar Ó Domhnaill; 22 February 1893 – 13 May 1986) was an Irish republican, socialist and writer who is known as one of the foremost radicals of 20th-century in that country.

== Early life ==
O'Donnell was born into an Irish-speaking Catholic family in Meenmore, near Dungloe, County Donegal in 1893. He was the fifth son of James O'Donnell, a kiln worker, migrant labourer, and musician, and Brigid Rodgers. His uncle Peter was a member of the Industrial Workers of the World in Butte, Montana, whom Peadar met on trips home to Ireland.

He attended St Patrick's College, Dublin, where he trained as a teacher. He taught on Arranmore Island off the west coast of Donegal. Here he was introduced to socialism, organizing for the Irish Transport and General Workers' Union (ITGWU) in 1918 before spending time in Scotland.

== Irish War of Independence ==
By 1919, O'Donnell was a leading organiser for the ITGWU. He attempted in Derry to organise a unit of the Irish Citizen Army (a socialist militia which had taken part in the Easter Rising). When this failed to get off the ground, O'Donnell joined the Irish Republican Army (IRA) and remained active in it during the Irish War of Independence (1919–1921). He led IRA guerrilla activities in County Londonderry and Donegal in this period, which mainly involved raids on Royal Irish Constabulary and British Army installations. In 1921 he became commander of the 2nd Brigade of the Northern Volunteer Division of the IRA. In early 1921 several attacks on troop trains were carried out by the west Donegal IRA. He became known in this period as a headstrong and sometimes insubordinate officer as he often launched operations without orders and in defiance of directives from his superiors in the IRA. O'Donnell also attempted to subvert decisions of the Dáil Courts when he felt that the interests of large estate-holders were being upheld, and prevented Irish Republican Police in his Brigade area from enforcing such judgments, particularly those of the Land Arbitration Courts. In the spring of 1921, O'Donnell and his men evaded a sweep of County Londonderry by a British force numbering over 1,000 strong.

== Irish Civil War ==
After the Anglo-Irish Treaty of 1922, the IRA was split over whether to accept this compromise, which ended their hopes of an Irish Republic in the short-term, but which meant an immediate self-governing Irish Free State. O'Donnell opposed this compromise and in April 1922, was elected, along with Joe McKelvey, as a representative for Ulster on the anti-Treaty IRA's Army Executive. In April he was among the anti-Treaty IRA men who took over the Four Courts building in Dublin, which became the first focus of the outbreak of civil war with the new Free State government. The Civil War would rage for another nine months. O'Donnell escaped from the Four Courts building after its bombardment and surrender but was subsequently captured by the Free State Army. O'Donnell was imprisoned in Mountjoy Gaol and the Curragh. Following the end of the Civil War, he participated in the mass republican hunger strike (1923 Irish Hunger Strikes) that was launched in protest at the continued imprisonment of anti-Treaty IRA men, remaining on hunger strike for 41 days. O'Donnell's prison experience (21 months) and eventual escape in March 1924, are described in his 1932 memoir The Gates Flew Open. Reflecting on the Civil War in a late interview, O'Donnell was to say:

"I did realise that a great many of the people who said No to the Treaty had different views from me. And this is a factor that has never sufficiently been stressed in dealing with the resistance to the Treaty. I think there were many men like Michael Kilroy, Billy Pilkinton, Tom Maguire and others too, who, having taken an oath of loyalty to the Republic and having killed in defence of it, and pals of theirs having died in defence of it, I think that their vow to the Republic was a vow that they couldn't shed themselves of. They were the kind of people that were bound to say no, and would have to be fired on to come down from the high ground of the Republic to the low level of the Treaty. They were the kind of men who make martyrs, but I don't think they make revolutions."

In March 1924 O'Donnell walked out of the Curragh camp dressed in Free State uniform. He hid out for several days before approaching a cottage where he said to the owner "I'm Peadar O'Donnell, IRA Executive. I want to get in touch with the organization here." The owner was able to assist O'Donnell.

== Socialism ==
Like certain other Irish republicans of this era, O'Donnell did not see the republican cause solely in Irish nationalist terms. O'Donnell also advocated a social revolution in an independent Ireland, seeing himself as a follower of James Connolly, the socialist republican executed for his part in the leadership of the Easter Rising. The period 1919–23 had seen much social unrest in Ireland, including land occupations by the tenants in rural areas and the Occupation of factories by workers. O'Donnell, in fact, is regarded as the first Irish person to use the term "occupation" in relation to the occupation of a workplace, when he and the staff of Monaghan Asylum occupied the hospital in 1919. "The occupation was, in fact, the first action in Ireland to describe itself as a soviet, and the Red Flag was raised above it." It was also one of the first declared Soviets outside of Russia. O'Donnell became governor of the Soviet and declared a 48-hour week for the workers and sacked the matron for insubordination. Eventually, they went back to work pending a settlement.

O'Donnell believed that the IRA should have adopted the people's cause and supported land re-distribution and workers' rights. He blamed the anti-Treaty republicans' lack of support among the Irish public in the Civil War on their lack of a social programme. Some republicans, notably Liam Mellows, did share O'Donnell's view, and in fact, there was a large redistribution of land from absentee landlords to tenants in the new Free State.

According to historian Tom Mahon,

"There were many contradictions and weaknesses in O'Donnell's polemic. In reality, the IRA was a petit bourgeoisie conspiratorial organisation rather than a workers' and peasants' army. It was firmly rooted in the nineteenth-century concept of a nationalist revolution and its few socialists were largely peripheral to the organisation. Kevin O'Higgins, a leading Sinn Féin activist during the Anglo-Irish War, famously said, 'We were probably the most conservative-minded revolutionaries who ever put through a successful revolution.' Additionally, O'Donnell failed to justify the IRA's refusal to acknowledge the wishes of the majority of the southern Irish population who supported the Free State. Most glaring of all, he had no satisfactory explanation of what to do with the Protestant working class in Northern Ireland, who were prepared to take up arms to prevent their 'liberation' by the IRA. Despite the many flaws of his argument, he has received much serious attention from historians and biographers."

O'Donnell was opposed to the Catholic nationalism of many IRA members, and once said disparagingly "we don't have an IRA battalion in Belfast, we have a battalion of armed Catholics".

O'Donnell lost a libel case he took against the Dominican published "Irish Rosary" monthly, following articles in the magazine that claimed he was a Soviet agent and had studied at the Moscow Lenin School.

== Post-Civil War politics ==
In 1923, while still in prison, he was elected as a Sinn Féin Teachta Dála (TD) for Donegal. In 1924, on release from internment, O'Donnell became a member of the Executive and Army Council of the anti-Treaty IRA. He also took over as the editor of the republican newspaper An Phoblacht. He did not take his seat in the Dáil and did not stand at the June 1927 general election. He tried to steer it in a left-wing direction, and to this end founded organisations such as the Irish Working Farmers' Committee, which sent representatives to the Soviet Union and to the Profintern.

O'Donnell also founded the Anti-Tribute League, which opposed the repaying of annuities to the British government under the Irish Land Acts (these were set at a rate of £3,100,000 a year, a huge cost to the new state; they were ceased by Éamon de Valera on his accession to power in 1932, and in retaliation, the British government declared an Economic War; the payments were resolved in 1938 by an agreement that Ireland would pay Britain £10 million). O'Donnell also founded a short-lived socialist republican party, Saor Éire.

In February 1932, the Fianna Fáil party was elected to the Irish Free State government. On 18 March 1932, the new government suspended the Public Safety Act, lifting the ban on a number of organisations including the Irish Republican Army. Several anti-Treaty IRA political prisoners were released around the same time, including Frank Ryan, a Saor Éire colleague of O'Donnell's, who on his release declared "as long as we have fists and boots, there will be no free speech for traitors".

The newly legalized and liberated Republicans began a "campaign of unrelenting hostility" against their former enemies in the Civil War, breaking up Cumann na nGaedheal political meetings and intimidating supporters. In reaction to this, in August 1932 Ned Cronin founded the Army Comrades Association nicknamed "the Blueshirts" comprising former members of the Free State army who pledged to provide security at Cumann na nGaedheal events. Following much street violence between the two sides and increasing fascist tendencies amongst the Blueshirts, both Blueshirts and IRA were banned again.

In 1933, O'Donnell wrote an introduction to Brian O'Neill’s book The War for the Land in Ireland.

== Republican Congress ==
The flag of the Republican Congress, The Starry Plough

O'Donnell's attempts at persuading the remnants of the defeated anti-Treaty IRA to become a socialist organisation ended in failure. Eventually, O'Donnell and other left-wing republicans left the IRA to co-found the Republican Congress in 1934 with other socialists, communists and Cumann na mBan members.

The overriding aim of the Republican Congress was the maintenance of a united front against fascism. Despite having left the IRA, O'Donnell and others were tried in absentia by an IRA court-martial presided over by Seán Russell which dismissed them 'with ignominy'.

The high point of the Republican Congress was between May and September 1934, when it achieved remarkable success as an umbrella organisation for class agitation. It earned the wrath of the IRA leadership, which banned IRA members from joining it. This led to widespread defections to the Congress from the IRA in Dublin, and the spectacular success of the Republican Congress in organising Belfast Protestants under the Republican Congress banner.

On a march by the Shankill Road branch to Bodenstown churchyard in June 1934 to honour the founding father of Irish republicanism, Theobald Wolfe Tone the Shankill republicans, many of whom were members of the Northern Ireland Socialist Party, carried banners with slogans such as 'Break the Connection with Capitalism' and 'United Irishmen of 1934'. To the bemusement of many, the IRA leadership blocked the Belfast contingent from carrying their banners and attempted to seize them.

The Republican Congress spearheaded attacks on Blueshirts in Dublin, while the IRA rank and file continued attacks on them elsewhere. By September 1934 the state was crushing the Blueshirts; leading Fine Gael figures abandoned the Blueshirt leadership under Eoin O'Duffy, reverting to parliamentary politics. With the demise of the Blueshirts imminent, 186 delegates attended what became the final Republican Congress assembly in Rathmines Town Hall on 29 and 30 September 1934. The Congress split on a proposal by Michael Price to turn it into a political party, a proposal which was perceived by the Communist Party of Ireland and other vested interests as threatening their power. O'Donnell also rejected the proposal, arguing that the Left had more power as a united front.

== Spanish Civil War and after ==
In 1936 O'Donnell was in Barcelona in order to attend the planned People's Olympiad on the outbreak of the Spanish Civil War. He joined the Spanish Republican militia that supported the Popular Front government against Francisco Franco's military insurgency. When he returned to Ireland, he encouraged other republicans to fight for the Spanish Republic. Republican Congress members led by Frank Ryan and some Communist Party of Ireland members joined the International Brigades, where they were known as the Connolly Column (named after James Connolly).

This was an unpopular stance in Ireland, as the powerful Catholic Church supported Franco's Catholic Nationalists. Attitudes to the Spanish Civil War mirrored the divisions of Ireland's civil war. O'Donnell remarked that the bishops had condemned the anti-Treaty side in the latter for opposing a democratic government, but were now advocating the same thing themselves. O'Donnell's former comrade Eoin O'Duffy, leader of the Blueshirts, led the ultra-Catholic Irish Brigade to Spain to support the Nationalists; they were sent home by Franco.

Although supportive of the Republican side he was critical of the attacks on priests and churches by the anarchists. He referred to these attacks as "dark backwardness" and "outrages", along with being concerned with how anti-Fascist Catholics would respond.

== Vietnam War ==
Still active in the later part of his life, O'Donnell was chairman of the anti-Vietnam War "Irish Voice on Vietnam" organisation which he co-founded with Dan Breen.

== Writings ==
After the 1940s, O'Donnell devoted more of his time to writing and culture and less to politics, from which he withdrew more or less completely. He published his first novel, Storm, in 1925. This was followed by Islanders (1928, which was published in the US under the title, "The Way it Was With Them"), which received national and international acclaim, The New York Times describing it as a novel of "quiet brilliance and power", conservative London magazine The Spectator "an intensely beautiful picture of peasant life." The writer Benedict Kiely recalled meeting a Chicago man in Iowa in 1968 who had never been to Ireland but could describe the landscape of west Donegal, and the ways of its people, in minute detail despite being blind. When Kiely asked him how he knew so much he revealed he had read Islanders in Braille. Adrigoole, published in 1929, was swiftly followed by The Knife (1930) and On the Edge of the Stream (1934). As noted, O'Donnell went to Spain at the time of the Spanish Civil War and later published Salud! An Irishman in Spain (1937). Adrigoole was set in Donegal, but based on the real-life story of the O'Sullivans, a Cork family who had all died of starvation in 1927, and is 'by far the gloomiest and most pessimistic of his books'.

Other books by O'Donnell included The Big Windows (1955) and Proud Island (1975). The Big Windows is, in the words of Donal Ó Drisceoil, 'by common consent his finest literary achievement.... The reviews at the time, and on its reissue in 1983, were universally positive.'

Islanders and Adrigoole were translated into Ulster Irish (Donegal dialect) by Seosamh Mac Grianna as Muintir an Oileáin and Eadarbhaile, respectively. All of his work has a strong social consciousness, works like Adrigoole, as well as being powerful pieces in themselves, exemplify socialist analyses of Irish society. A biographical documentary entitled Peadairín na Stoirme was screened on TG4 in 2009.

He co-founded and edited the literary journal The Bell with Seán Ó Faoláin in 1940. After World War II, O'Donnell co-edited the magazine with Róisín Walsh from 1946 until 1954. O'Donnell was one of four Irishmen named on George Orwell's 1948 list of people unsuitable for anti-communist propaganda work for the British government's Information Research Department; the others being Seán O'Casey, George Bernard Shaw and Cecil Day-Lewis.

His one play, Wrack, was first performed at the Abbey Theatre in Dublin on 21 November 1932, and published by Jonathan Cape the following year.

In total O'Donnell wrote seven novels and one play, in addition to three autobiographical accounts: The Gates flew Open (London, 1932), about his part in the Irish War of Independence and Irish Civil War; Salud! An Irishman in Spain (London, 1937), about his time in Spain during the Spanish Civil War and There Will Be Another Day (Dublin, 1963), his account of the land annuities campaign in the 1920s and 1930s.

Peadar and his wife Lile travelled widely across Europe. On a trip to the United States in 1939, during which he met the singer Paul Robeson, O'Donnell is reputed to have taught Robeson the words of the song "Kevin Barry", which became one of Robeson's most performed numbers.

== Personal life ==
Following his escape from Kilmainham jail, Peadar married Cumann na mBan officer Lile O'Donel on 25 June 1924. He had never met Lile before this, but they had communicated extensively during his time in prison—she had been a conduit for Republican messages from the outside, while he was heavily involved in communications from the inside. O'Donnell himself describes a story of how she bluffed her way in to see Thomas Johnson, then leader of the Labour party, and gave him a message that he would be shot if O'Donnell were executed. Witnesses at Lile and Peadar's wedding included his brother Frank, Sinéad de Valera, Fiona Plunkett of Cumann na mBan and Mary MacSwiney. They began their honeymoon in a hotel in County Dublin that evening, but by the following morning O'Donnell was on the run once again because he had been identified. Lile had a large inheritance and this allowed Peadar to devote himself to his writing and political activism, allowing O'Donnell to, in the words of Donal Ó Drisceoil, 'live the life of that favourite bogeyman of police reports, the "professional agitator"'. They lived in Marlborough Road in Donnybrook for many years.

They later lived in 174 Upper Drumcondra Road in Drumcondra, and it was there that he and Lile raised their nephew. After Peadar's brother Joe was killed in an accident in New York, Peadar and Lile offered to bring Joe's young son, Peadar Joe, who was almost five, back with them to Ireland for an extended holiday. When World War II broke out, Peadar Joe stayed with them permanently and they raised him as their son. They had no children of their own. Peadar Joe attended the fee-charging Catholic secondary school Belvedere College.

After the death of his wife in October 1969, O'Donnell sold their home and moved to a bedsit in Dublin. He then stayed with a friend in Mullingar, Ned Gilligan, and he also lived with Peadar Joe and his family. He spent the final seven years of his life living at the home of his old friend Nora Harkin in Monkstown, Dublin.

In 1985 O'Donnell wrote his last piece for publication, "Not Yet Emmet", an account of the Treaty split of 1922. In 1986, at the age of 93, Peadar O'Donnell died. He left instructions that there were to be "no priests, no politicians and no pomp" at his funeral, and those wishes were granted. Following cremation at Glasnevin Cemetery, his ashes were placed in his wife Lile's family plot in Kilconduff cemetery outside Swinford, County Mayo.

The Irish folk-rock band Moving Hearts recorded Tribute to Peadar O'Donnell, written by Dónal Lunny, on their 1985 album The Storm.

== Works ==
- Storm, novel, 1925.
- Islanders, novel, 1928. (Published in U.S.A. as The Way it Was With Them; translated into Irish by Seosamh Mac Grianna.)
- Adrigoole, novel, 1929. (Translated into Irish by Seosamh Mac Grianna as Eadarbhaile.)
- The Knife, novel, 1930. (Published in U.S.A. as There Will Be Fighting)
- The Gates Flew Open, Irish Civil War prison diary, 1932.
- Wrack, play, first performed 1932, published 1933.
- On the Edge of a Stream, novel, 1934.
- Salud! An Irishman in Spain, memoir, 1937.
- The Big Windows, 1955.
- There Will Be Another Day, autobiographical, 1963.
- Proud Island, 1975.
- Not Yet Emmet, a history, 1985.

== See also ==
- John Fahy
- Ernie O'Malley
- List of members of the Oireachtas imprisoned during the Irish revolutionary period

Dáil	Election	Deputy (Party)	Deputy (Party)	Deputy (Party)	Deputy (Party)	Deputy (Party)	Deputy (Party)	Deputy (Party)	Deputy (Party)
2nd	1921	Joseph O'Doherty (SF)	Samuel O'Flaherty (SF)	Patrick McGoldrick (SF)	Joseph McGinley (SF)	Joseph Sweeney (SF)	Peter Ward (SF)	6 seats 1921–1923	
3rd	1922	Joseph O'Doherty (AT-SF)	Samuel O'Flaherty (AT-SF)	Patrick McGoldrick (PT-SF)	Joseph McGinley (PT-SF)	Joseph Sweeney (PT-SF)	Peter Ward (PT-SF)	6 seats 1921–1923	
4th	1923	Joseph O'Doherty (Rep)	Peadar O'Donnell (Rep)	Patrick McGoldrick (CnaG)	Eugene Doherty (CnaG)	Patrick McFadden (CnaG)	Peter Ward (CnaG)	James Myles (Ind.)	John White (FP)
4th	1924 by-election	Joseph O'Doherty (Rep)	Peadar O'Donnell (Rep)	Patrick McGoldrick (CnaG)	Eugene Doherty (CnaG)	Patrick McFadden (CnaG)	Denis McCullough (CnaG)	James Myles (Ind.)	John White (FP)
5th	1927 (Jun)	Frank Carney (FF)	Neal Blaney (FF)	Daniel McMenamin (NL)	Eugene Doherty (CnaG)	Michael Óg McFadden (CnaG)	Hugh Law (CnaG)	James Myles (Ind.)	John White (FP)
6th	1927 (Sep)	Frank Carney (FF)	Neal Blaney (FF)	Archie Cassidy (Lab)	Eugene Doherty (CnaG)	Michael Óg McFadden (CnaG)	Hugh Law (CnaG)	James Myles (Ind.)	John White (FP)
7th	1932	Frank Carney (FF)	Neal Blaney (FF)	Brian Brady (FF)	Eugene Doherty (CnaG)	Daniel McMenamin (CnaG)	James Dillon (Ind.)	James Myles (Ind.)	John White (CnaG)
8th	1933	Joseph O'Doherty (FF)	Neal Blaney (FF)	Brian Brady (FF)	Hugh Doherty (FF)	Daniel McMenamin (CnaG)	James Dillon (NCP)	James Myles (Ind.)	Michael Óg McFadden (CnaG)
9th	1937	Constituency abolished. See Donegal East and Donegal West							

Dáil	Election	Deputy (Party)	Deputy (Party)	Deputy (Party)	Deputy (Party)	Deputy (Party)
21st	1977	Hugh Conaghan (FF)	Joseph Brennan (FF)	Neil Blaney (IFF)	James White (FG)	Paddy Harte (FG)
21st	1980 by-election	Hugh Conaghan (FF)	Clement Coughlan (FF)	Neil Blaney (IFF)	James White (FG)	Paddy Harte (FG)
22nd	1981	Constituency abolished. See Donegal North-East and Donegal South-West				

Dáil	Election	Deputy (Party)	Deputy (Party)	Deputy (Party)	Deputy (Party)	Deputy (Party)
32nd	2016	Pearse Doherty (SF)	Pat "the Cope" Gallagher (FF)	Thomas Pringle (Ind.)	Charlie McConalogue (FF)	Joe McHugh (FG)
33rd	2020	Pearse Doherty (SF)	Pádraig Mac Lochlainn (SF)	Thomas Pringle (Ind.)	Charlie McConalogue (FF)	Joe McHugh (FG)
34th	2024	Pearse Doherty (SF)	Pádraig Mac Lochlainn (SF)	Charles Ward (100%R)	Charlie McConalogue (FF)	Pat "the Cope" Gallagher (FF)
