= Irish Republic (disambiguation) =

The Irish Republic was a revolutionary state in Ireland between 1919 and 1922. "Irish Republic" may also refer to:

- Irish Republic (1798), a revolutionary state proclaimed during the Irish Rebellion of 1798
- Easter Rising, when an Irish Republic was proclaimed by rebels
  - Proclamation of the Irish Republic
- The Irish Republic (book), a 1937 history book by Dorothy Macardle
- Republic of Ireland, the modern state, sometimes referred to as the "Irish Republic"
