= Róisín Walsh =

Dublin's first chief librarian, feminist and republican

- Born: 24 March 1889; Clogher, County Tyrone
- Died: 25 June 1949 (aged 60); Templeogue, Ireland

Róisín Walsh (24 March 1889 – 25 June 1949), was Dublin's first chief librarian, a feminist and a republican.

== Early life and education ==
Róisín Walsh was born Mary Rosalind on 24 March 1889 in Lisnamaghery, Clogher, County Tyrone to James Walsh and his wife Mary Shevlin. Walsh was the eldest of six girls and two boys. Her father was a national school teacher and farmer. The farm he worked was his wife's sixteen-acre family farm. The dual income meant that Walsh was able to get a good education. She was sent to St Louis Convent, Monaghan town, and Dominican College, Eccles Street, Dublin. Following that she attended college in University College Dublin where she graduated in 1911 with a Bachelors in Arts in Irish, French, German and English. After college Walsh worked as a teacher. She completed the Cambridge higher diploma and worked in St Louis Convent teaching English and German. She then went to Germany to work in Altona High School in 1913 but left due to the outbreak of World War I in 1914. She moved to Belfast where she worked as a lecturer in Irish and English in the primary-school teacher training course for St Mary's Training College.

== Nationalism ==
Walsh was involved with the nationalist independence movement. She had helped Seán Mac Diarmada as a Sinn Féin organiser in Ulster and worked with Nora Connolly O'Brien and her sister Ina, daughters of James Connolly. She was a member of Cumann na mBan from its formation in 1915. She also assisted Mac Diarmada with correspondence to the United States in the lead up to 1916. Her local priest at home was an Irish Republican Brotherhood activist, Fr James O'Daly, who let her know the plan for the rising Easter 1916. Due to the confusion caused by Eoin MacNeill on Easter Sunday, the mobilisation planned for Tyrone was abortive. Various IRB activists along with the Walsh family, the Connolly sisters and Archie Heron tried to remobilise. Walsh and her brother Tom and sister Teresa helped to move armaments to the local company. Walsh remained involved in nationalist activities for the next few years and eventually had to quit her teaching position by 1919 because of harassment for her politics.

Having returned home to Clogher from Belfast, Walsh was appointed by Tyrone County Council as their first woman rate collector in 1921. She was fired in 1922 for refusing to sign a declaration of allegiance to the King. When her family home was raided by the Royal Ulster Constabulary there were a number of documents found which were allegedly sedition and she fled Northern Ireland and moved to Dublin that month. An exclusion order was put against her by the authorities in Northern Ireland.

== Librarian ==
In Dublin, by December 1922, her qualifications allowed Walsh to get a position as a children's library assistant librarian in Rathmines. It was a new library which opened the following May. Her family sold their land in Tyrone and moved to a farm in Templeogue, Dublin. Walsh herself spent time working in Galway in 1925 as an assistant librarian and in 1926 as chief librarian in County Dublin. She gained an associateship of the UK library Association in 1928 and began to ensure that the whole public library system gained a degree of professionalism that was new to the role. Walsh was elected to the executive board of the Library Association of Ireland in 1928. In 1941 she became chair of the board.

Walsh was appointed to the position of chief librarian in 1931. There was a large scale reorganisation of Dublin local government which changed boundaries in the city. This marked the start of the modern library service in Dublin city. Walsh developed new library buildings in Inchicore, Drumcondra, Phibsborough and Ringsend. Walsh believed in 'revolution by education ... for there can be no progress until the people have been educated first'. She ensured access to books in Irish and by Irish authors. She worked to increase foreign awareness of Irish literature and went on tours of United States cities giving presentations on Irish topics.

Walsh continued to be a national activist using her home to launch the new party Saor Éire as well as working on the editorial board of The Bell with Peadar O'Donnell. She was a regular speaker at the meetings of the Women's Social and Progressive League founded by Hanna Sheehy-Skeffington and with Mary Hayden and Maud Gonne MacBride.

Walsh died at home on 25 June 1949 in Templeogue and was buried in Templeogue cemetery.
