= Jack White (Irish socialist) =

Irish Citizen Army co-founder (1879–1946)

Personal details
- Born: 22 May 1879 Broughshane, County Antrim, Ireland
- Died: 2 February 1946 (aged 66) Belfast, Northern Ireland
- Party: Ulster Liberal Association (1912–1913); Workers Socialist Federation (1918–1924); Irish Worker League (1923–1926); Irish Worker's Party (1926–1927); Revolutionary Workers' Groups (1930–1933); Republican Congress (1934–1936)
- Other political affiliations: Irish Transport and General Workers' Union; Irish Citizen Army; Irish Volunteers; Secular Society of Ireland; FAI-CNT London Bureau

Military service
- Branch/service: British Army
- Years of service: 1899–1907
- Rank: Captain
- Unit: Gordon Highlanders
- Battles/wars: Second Boer War
- Awards: Distinguished Service Order

Captain James Robert "Jack" White, DSO (22 May 1879 – 2 February 1946) was an Irish republican and libertarian socialist. After colonial service in the British military, he entered Irish politics in 1913 working with Roger Casement in Ulster to detach fellow Protestants from Unionism as it armed to resist Irish Home Rule, and with James Connolly to defend the Irish Transport and General Workers' Union in the great Dublin lock-out. White rallied to the defence of those condemned for the 1916 Easter Rising, but the combination of his socialism and anti-clericalism placed him at odds with the principal currents of Irish republicanism. Until experience of Republican Spain in 1936 convinced him of the anarchist critique of the party-state, he associated with a succession of communist-aligned groups. His last public appearance was in 1945, at an Orange Hall in his home town of Broughshane, County Antrim, where he proposed himself as a "republican socialist" candidate in the upcoming United Kingdom general election.

== Early years ==
Jack White was born on 22 May 1879, at Broughshane, near Ballymena, County Antrim, to Amelia Mary White, daughter of Joseph Baly, Anglican Archdeacon of Calcutta, and her husband Captain—later Field Marshal— George White V.C., an Anglo-Irish landowner and distinguished soldier.

An only son, he initially followed in his father's footsteps. He boarded at Winchester College and, despite being expelled (on charges ranging from gambling to pyrotechnics), won a cadetship to the Royal Military College, Sandhurst.

== British officer and veteran ==
In 1899, White, commissioned as a lieutenant with the 1st Gordon Highlanders, was shipped out to South Africa for service in the Second Boer War. While his father's command was besieged at Ladysmith, he took part in the Battle of Magersfontein and the relief of Kimberley. Passing into the Orange Free State he saw action at Paardeberg, Poplar Grove, Driefontein, Vet River and Zand River. From May 1900 in the Transvaal, he took part in the engagement at Doornkop (where he threatened an officer who ordered him to shoot a shell-shocked prisoner), the occupation of Johannesburg and Pretoria and, in August 1900, in the last set-piece battle of the war at Belfast-Bergendal.

For his war service, White was mentioned in despatches, received the Queen's South Africa Medal with five clasps, and was decorated by Lord Kitchener with the Distinguished Service Order (DSO).

In 1902 he was appointed aide-de-camp to his father, General Sir George White, now Governor of Gibraltar. In this capacity he met Kaiser William II, and King Edward VII (who, of the two, made the dimmer impression). While at Gibraltar he courted Anna Mercedes Dolores (‘Dollie’) Mosley, a society beauty and devout Roman Catholic. Despite family objections on both sides, and after White had (with Kitchener's leave) returned from a posting in Peshawar, India to press his suit, they were married in a registry office in 1905.

In 1907, responding to the tedium of Territorial duties in Aberdeen; the brutality of his wartime experience; and the belief that in the wake of Russo-Japanese War that the days of the empire he had served were numbered (he describes receiving news of Japanese victories with "something like ecstacy"), White resigned his commission. He relayed his decision to his father, who thought him mad; to H.G. Wells, who, appalled, said he would like to "thrash" White's governesses and schoolmasters; and to Leo Tolstoy, who returned his blessing.

== Tolstoyan ==
Finding himself adrift—teaching English in Bohemia was followed by a succession of farm-labouring jobs in England—White sought to conform to Tolstoy's Sermon-on-the-Mount vision of a simple life. While from the start remaining "clear" of teetotalism, White concluded that attempts to codify the ideas of the great Russian writer (whose first injunction was for each to follow his own conscience) were a mistake. In 1911, attracted by the government promise of free farm land, White left for Canada.

After enduring the rigours of a logging camp, he returned to England early in 1912. The Whites moved into a back-to-the-land community, Whiteway, in the Cotswolds, an early breakaway from a Tolstoyan community at Purleigh in Essex. Associated with Francis Sedlak (who had visited Tolstoy in Russia and returned to England on foot), it prized individual expression and freedom from convention. It was from here that White was recalled to Ireland by the death of his father in June 1912.

== Protestant home ruler ==
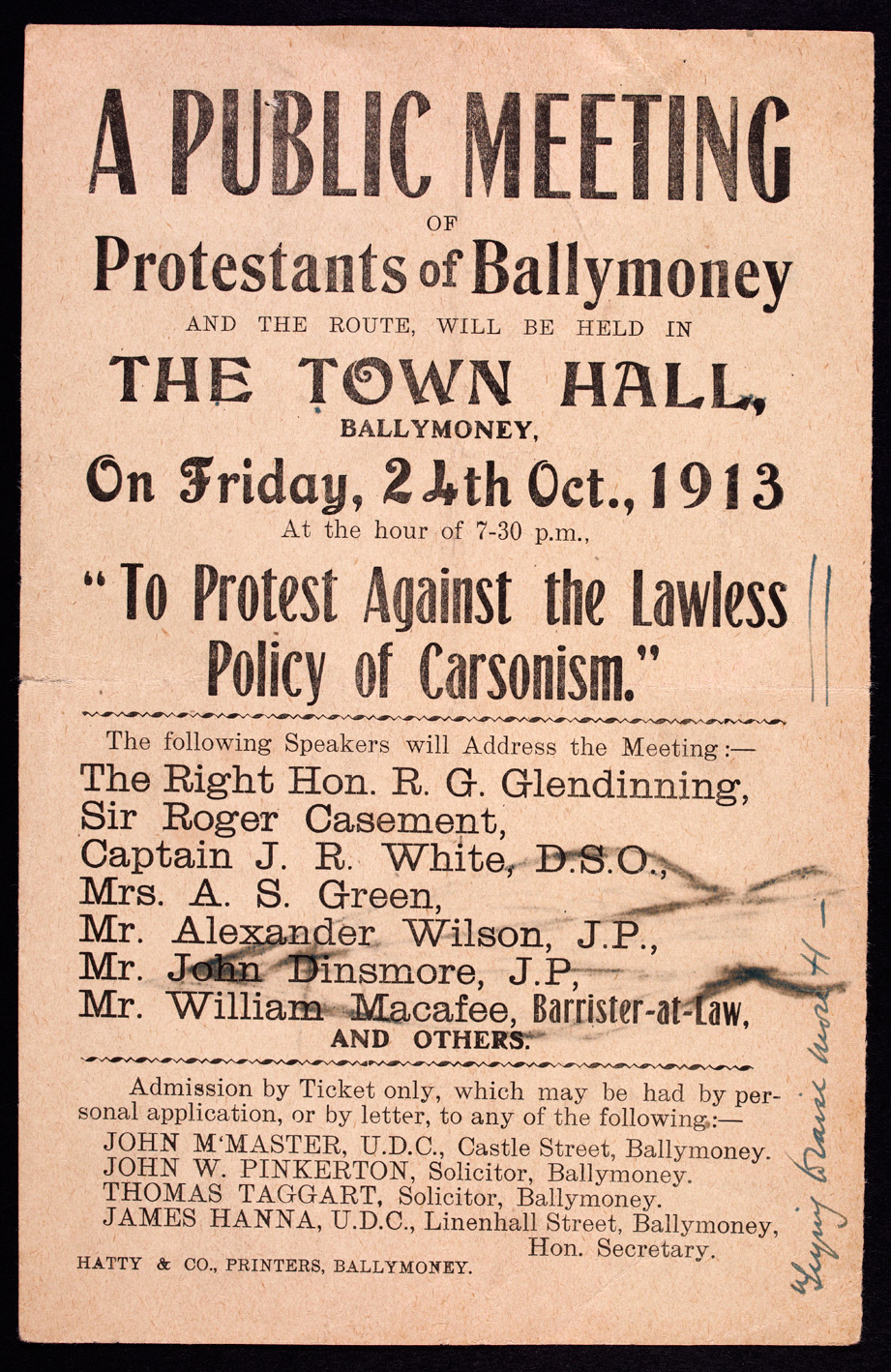
Poster advertising public meeting "Against the Lawless Policy of Carsonism"

=== "Protestantism and Home Rule" ===
Already, in advance of his return, White had assailed the Ulster Unionists as they organised under Edward Carson to resist a Home Rule parliament in Dublin. He wrote to the Belfast News Letter condemning the refusal of unionist crowds to let the Liberal minister Winston Churchill speak on Home Rule at the Ulster Hall. The failure to grant their opponent a hearing was an exercise in "Popery". Finding that it alone was willing to publish his letter (in its paper the Ulster Guardian), White joined the Ulster Liberal Association. It was with the promise that he would "not be idle on the side of progress and Protestantism". At issue, he argued, was "liberty of reason", and the right "to be represented by self-government or Home Rule in a nation, just as a free reason gives self-control to an individual.

In December 1912, White was invited by the Irish Protestant Home Rule Committee to speak in London on a platform with George Bernard Shaw, Stephen Gwynn M.P. and Arthur Conan Doyle. Addressing the motion against "the stirring up of religious rancour and intolerance in N.E. Ulster", White proposed that Roman Catholicism and Protestantism were two stages in the gradual evolution of the "universal human spirit". Both stages have their dangers, but of the two the danger of Protestantism for its laity is the greater:

The man who claims the direction of his own conscience claims to be his own priest, and unless he does all in his own power to prepare the way for others to attain the same liberty, his liberty is but selfish licence, and he is false to the trust of a priest. ... [But the Protestant] mocking the support [of an authoritative Church] upon which [his younger brother still] leans ... puts every obstacle in the way of his aspirations for further freedom. ... [He says] "I dare not help you to freedom lest you enslave me".

While "no man who is truly free fears for the results to himself of freedom won by others", White allowed that "he may fear the results of it for them". The Protestant Bishop of Down and Connor proposed that "by destroying the power of priests", Home Rule would "produce in Ireland the same irreligion and secularism that the advent of democratic government has produced in other Roman Catholic countries". The flaw in this, the "best argument" against home rule White had ever heard, was that in the continental Catholic countries the democratic movement had to fight the Church allied to the old order, whereas in Ireland, where the Church "can almost said to be one" with the National and Democratic movement, it is not Catholics but Protestants who "exclaim that the forces of Hell are being let loose".

White concluded by asserting, both as a Protestant and as a Home Ruler, that there can be no power, whether human or superhuman, "permanently independent of the consent of those upon whom authority is imposed", and by professing to "hear the spirit of Catholic Ireland crying out to the spirit of liberalism 'Give us some of the freedom you have won and we will give you some of the reverence and beauty you have lost'". His mainly Catholic audience cheered.

=== Ballymoney protest against Carsonism ===
In the hope of eliciting the same response from a home audience, and with the "wholehearted support" of the Rev. J. B. Armour of the ULA who similarly claimed home rule as a "Presbyterian principle", in October 1913 White helped organise a "Protestant protest" against "Carsonism" in Ballymoney. On a platform with Sir Roger Casement and Alice Stopford Green, and in the presence of reporters from all the major London and Irish papers, he proposed a Home Rule pledge to match the Carson's Ulster Covenant: "We intend to abide by the just laws of the lawful parliament of Ireland until such time as it may prove itself hostile to democracy, in sure confidence that God will stand by those who stand by the people irrespective of class or Creed."

As a result of the Ballymoney meeting White was invited to Dublin, where he spoke at the Literary and Historical Society in University College Dublin (UCD) alongside John Dillon and Tom Kettle. Neither nationalist politician appreciated being pressed by White to make "a supreme effort" to assuage Protestant fears of Rome Rule —of Catholic clerical domination.

In Ulster, Casement sought, without success, to build upon the Ballymoney meeting. The Times of London was able to conclude that it had represented but a "small pocket of dissident Protestants, the last survivors of the Old Liberals.”

== Labour, and national, volunteer ==
White (with bandaged head) and Francis Sheehy-Skeffington after their release on bail following an unemployment march in Dublin, Freeman's Journal, 16 March 1914

=== Irish Citizen Army ===
Dublin at the time of the White's UCD meeting was in the midst of the great lockout by employers of workers newly organized by the Irish Transport and General Workers' Union (ITGWU). White was incensed by the violence of the Dublin Metropolitan Police. In August 1913, he was himself caught in a baton charge (on Butt Bridge) and was dragged to the police station, with Constance Markievicz "hammering the police on the back" with her fists in an effort to release him.

White was also outraged by the intervention of the Catholic Church. With the sanction of Archbishop William Joseph Walsh, Hibernian crowds prevented the poorly-nourished children of the locked-out and striking workers leaving the city to be taken into the care of sympathetic, but not necessarily Catholic, families in Liverpool and Belfast. (The children's holiday scheme had been devised by the socialist feminist Dora Montefiore). White offered his services to ITGWU leader James Connolly (James Larkin was then in prison), proposing to drill union men as a workers' defence corps, a "Citizen Army" (and to put £50 toward their shoes).

Connolly helped in the organisation to which Markievicz contributed her Fianna Éireann nationalist youth, and in November 1913 the Irish Citizen Army (ICA) was born. Although in March 1914 he was again batoned, and charged with assault, White claimed that the appearance of the new force had "put manners on the police".

But by the spring, having failed to persuade the British Trades Union Congress to vote action in support of the Dublin workers, Larkin was urging a return to work, and the ranks were thinning. In May 1914, White resigned, replaced as chairman of the ICA's "Army Council" by Larkin. He transferred to the new-formed Irish Volunteers.

=== Irish Volunteers ===
Secretary to the ICA Council, Seán O'Casey, described the formation of the nationalist force as "one of the most effective blows" that the ICA had received. Men who might have joined the ICA were now drilling—with the blessing of the Irish Republican Brotherhood (IRB)—under a command that included employers who had locked out men trying to exercise "the first principles of Trade Unionism". When it became apparent that Connolly was gravitating towards an IRB strategy of cooperation with the Volunteers, O'Casey and Francis Sheehy-Skeffington, the Vice President, resigned.

Claiming always to have sought "to link the Labour and National Causes as soon as they can be linked", White insisted that the Volunteers were a complementary force. Later, looking back from beyond the 1916 Easter Rising and War of Independence, he was to regret the move. Better, he suggested, to have "stuck with the Citizen Army", where he had "the clear guidance of international revolutionary principle undercutting and outlasting the conflict of national interests that caused the Great War." He also imagined that had he stayed with the ICA he could have "merged National in Labour ideals instead of leaving the merger to come the other way round".

What White had failed to appreciate, according ICA veteran and trade unionist, Frank Robbins, was that "the socialistic ideals expressed in the constitution of the Irish Citizen Army were not understood by the workers, and where understood were not acceptable".

White was given command of brigades of Volunteers in the northwest: Derry City, Inishowen, and east Tyrone. Many of them were former British soldiers like himself, but White found his authority undermined by the suspicion that as a Protestant he would never lead them into a fight against Orangemen.

Following the declaration of war upon Germany in August 1914, White wrote a memorandum to Lord Kitchener and Sir Ian Hamilton proposing that the Volunteers serve as an Irish home guard. In contrast to John Redmond's call for them to enlist for imperial service, this would have had the Volunteers paid and equipped by the British to remain under their own command at home. But he found his comrades no less suspicious than the government: "I was taken to be recruiting for Britain, whereas I was trying to use Britain to put Ireland into a position to enforce her own claims". White was dismissed from his Volunteer commands.

== War-weary rebel sympathiser ==
White was appalled by the war, but felt he could not remain inactive. Rather than re-join his regiment, White had his Ford two-seater car converted to a field ambulance. With the apparent approval of his old Boer War commander, Field Marshall Earl Roberts, White drove the vehicle to the front in Belgium and joined an Australian Ambulance unit.

Fetching "carloads of blasted humanity off the ‘wounded’ trains", White saw enough to confirm his "instinctive loathing of the whole filthy mechanical slaughter". With Dollie, who had joined him as a nurse, he retired to Paris, and there they parted. Dollie, with their daughter Avé, went to her mother in Gibraltar and they divorced some time afterwards. White, meanwhile, mingled on the Parisian Left-Bank with an artistic set around Maud Gonne.

It has been suggested that some of what White had to say about sexual relations and marriage would, even by the standards of the time, be considered misogynistic. But amidst of the mobilisation and carnage of the war, he did propose the war would have cured the evil which had caused it "by completing the freeing women, it had begun".

In November 1915, White produced a manifesto, "Ireland's Hour", for the pacifist paper, The Irish Citizen. It called for a return to the idealism of the United Irishmen—a vision of a society of equals based on justice and freedom—but did not, itself, propose armed revolt. (White later conceded that he had "no clear goal of violent revolution, national or social" when drilling the ICA). After the Easter Rising, which found him in England, he hatched a plan to bring out the Welsh miners (cutting, he imagined, the coal supply to the British fleet) on behalf of Connolly and his condemned comrades. Arrested in May, on 2 August, he was transferred from Swansea to Pentonville Prison and confined within fifty yards of the hanging shed in which Casement was executed the following morning. In December 1916 he visited Constance Markievicz, then in Aylesbury Women's Prison for her role in the Rising, lobbied on her behalf and when she was released in June 1917 was among the first friends she met in London. Together with Eve Gore-Booth, they defiantly enjoyed strawberries and cream on the terrace of the House of Commons.

In 1918, White joined Sylvia Pankhurst's Workers Socialist Federation. Because of its anti-parliamentary and councilist position, it was one of the groups pilloried by Lenin in his work Left-Wing Communism: An Infantile Disorder (1920), and until its dissolution in 1924 was to remain at odds with the Moscow-approved Communist Party of Great Britain.

== Left republican ==
=== On Labour and Sinn Féin ===
Able, after an exclusion order, to return to Ireland, White appeared on Sinn Féin platforms in the December 1918 Westminster election campaign. But he had also written to William O'Brien and Thomas Johnson offering to stand as a candidate for Irish Labour. They declined: he was not a member "of good standing" in any labour organisation. In the event, Labour stood aside for Sinn Féin and ran no candidates.

Immediately after the election, in which the republican party triumphed across the south and west of the country, White wrote a pamphlet, The Significance of Sinn Féin: Psychological. Political, and Economic. Defending what he understood as the syndicalist ideals of James Connolly, he argued that while Sinn Féin may have harnessed the powerful emotive appeal of nationhood (of "race"), without the consciousness of class it would never achieve its republic. Contending not just with Britain and its "80,000 troops in Ireland", but also with the "capitalistic" international order intent on maintaining the status quo, the Democratic Programme of Dáil Éireann (which Thomas Johnson had helped draft) would not be realised without drawing together republicanism and socialism.

=== "Christian Communist" ===
In 1923 a Labour League organised in Letterkenny asked White to stand for the Dáil "as a candidate in the interests of the Workers' Republic". On this occasion it was White who declined. He cited the Dáil's Oath of Allegiance requiring him to be "faithful to HM King George V". But in the Derry Journal, he was also to declare that, as a "Christian communist", he was "not prepared to go forward as the representative of any class or party, but only of a principle…the voluntary change to communal ownership of the land" and the "gradual withering of the poisoned branches of standing armies, prisons and the workhouse system".

While this appeared to be a decided anti-Bolshevik position, later that same year White joined James Larkin's the Irish Worker League (IWL), Ireland's Communist International affiliate. In 1926, he broke away with James Connolly's son Roddy, to form the Workers' Party of Ireland. But this too sought recognition from Moscow and when, in deference to the IWL, this was refused, the party dissolved. (Already in 1920, White had funded Roddy Connolly's attendance at the 2nd World Congress of the Communist International, during which he met Lenin).

In 1927, the British Intelligence suspected White of promoting a link between Moscow and the IRA in the form of a Workers Defence Corps. The reports can only have related to discussions, since Roddy Connolly continued to float the idea of a Workers Defence Corps or "new ICA" for the next several years.

=== Revolutionary Workers Group and the new ICA ===
In Belfast in 1931, White was pulled from an unemployed "hunger march" organised by the Revolutionary Workers Groups (the Moscow-approved successor to the IWL), beaten and jailed for a month. He was then served with a four-year exclusion order under the 1922 Special Powers Act (Northern Ireland) prohibiting him from residing in any part of Northern Ireland other than in the district of Limavady in the far north-west. In 1932, he was again manhandled, and was injured, when in east Belfast loyalists (the Ulster Protestant League) attacked a RWG protest against cuts in Outdoor Relief.

In March 1933, fired by pastoral warnings against the spread of left-wing ideas, hymn-singing crowds in Dublin attacked the RWG headquarters in Connolly House, the Workers’ College in Eccles Street and the Workers Union of Ireland office in Marlborough Street. At this point, a new Irish Citizen Army was finally launched by Connolly and Michael Price, a British Army and IRA veteran. While they urged units to have "harmonious" relations with the Irish Republican Army (IRA), their ranks did not accommodate members of the new Communist Party of Ireland (CPI), a reformulation of RWG under Seán Murray. Harkening back to the syndicalism of the early ITGWU, the ICA continued to advance the idea of One Big Union.

=== The Republican Congress ===
Belfast socialists walking behind "Break the Connection with Capitalism" banner, Bodenstown, 1934.

The new ICA, nonetheless, was revived within the context of a broad "anti-imperialist" coalition entered into by the CPI and other left-wing and labour groupings. An initiative of Price and those within the IRA who had joined him in calling for a Workers' Republic, the Republican Congress was formed in April 1934 at a convention in Athlone supported and attended by delegation of northern (and Protestant) trade unionists. White is said to have immediately organised a Dublin branch of the Congress composed solely of ex-British servicemen.

In June 1934, White turned up at the annual Wolfe Tone commemoration at Bodenstown with a contingent of 200 from the Protestant Shankill Road in Belfast, organised by members of the Congress-allied Socialist Party of Northern Ireland, among them 1916 veteran Winifred Carney and her ex-Ulster Volunteer husband, George McBride. Together with a further Belfast SPNI contingent from Ballymacarrett, they were attacked by IRA men who objected to their "red" ("Break The Connection with Capitalism") banner. The following year the ICA boycotted both the Bodenstown and IRA Easter commemorations arguing that the "all together against the British" sloganeering neglected the struggle against economic injustice.

After various proposals had been made within the Congress to deploy the ICA in the tradition of "physical force" republicanism (including the assassination of a particularly hardened slum landlord), such arms as they had from the IRA were returned. With the ICA, the Congress focussed on organizing tenement rent strikes, mass pickets in support of wage demands, and campaigns for further land reform in support of small farmers and landless labourers. However, by the summer of 1935 both the CPI and the ICA had split over the party-political implications of these efforts, and White had felt unable to follow in either direction.

The CPI influenced members followed a new directive to seek accommodation with de Valera's Fianna Fáil in a "united front" against British imperialism. Meanwhile, Connolly and Price, who had denounced de Valera's system of labour "arbitration and conciliation" as "practical fascism", tried to convince labour unions of the need for a new workers party. When this failed, they urged entry into the Labour parties north and south.

White remained with the diminishing rump of the Congress. Walking with them in the annual Easter parade to Glasnevin Cemetery in April 1936, he found himself the target of a right-wing mob. He was hit with an iron cross wrenched from a grave, and was saved from further injury only because a lull induced by the beginning of the Rosary allowed his comrades to spirit him to safety.

In an address to the Roger Casement Sinn Féin Club in Dublin in August 1936, White ventured a minimum programme for republican unity. It demanded "withdrawal of British troops from all Ireland"; an end to the Anglo-Irish trade war and to Ireland's payment of land annuities; repeal of special security legislation north and south (under which republicans were interned); an end to gerrymandering in the north and the reintroduction of proportional representation (abolished by the Unionists in 1925 to squeeze the republican and labour vote); and a joint Irish-British trade-union campaign "against Fascism and War". It is a programme that might have placed White within the ranks of a united front, were it not for his uncompromising anti-clericalism.

== Secularist ==
At the end of 1933, White joined the trade-unionist John Swift, the novelist Mary Manning, the (northern) playwright Denis Johnston, and the humanist Owen Sheehy-Skeffington in forming the Secular Society of Ireland. Its mission, as noted in the hostile Irish Press, was to establish "complete freedom of thought, speech and publication, liberty for mind, in the widest toleration compatible with orderly progress and rational conduct". It sought an end to, among other things, "the clerically-dictated ban" on divorce and on birth control, the Censorship of Publications Act and “the system of clerical management, and consequent sectarian teaching, in schools." It was also reported as supporting "full sex-education for all classes.”

These demands were a challenge not only to the devotionalism of the de Valera regime (which placed the Secular Society under Special Branch surveillance) but also to the priorities of almost every faction of Irish republicanism. The society's meetings in Dublin (from which it distributed the British journal The Freethinker) had to be by invitation only, and soon had to move to private houses outside the city.

In 1936, as the Irish Christian Front and the Blue Shirts mobilised in support of General Franco, members wound up the Secular Society and sent the proceeds to the beleaguered Spanish Government. In October White left Ireland to himself assist in the defence of the Spanish Republic.

== Anarchist ==
=== Spanish impressions ===
Most accounts of White's experience of Spain, including that of the only book-length study of his life, Leo Keohane's Captain Jack White: Imperialism, Anarchism & the Irish Citizen Army (2014), rely on the reminiscences of Albert Meltzer. Melzer first met White in 1937, after his return, when he was campaigning in support of Spanish anarchists in London.

In his introduction to a 1980 reprint of White's pamphlet The Meaning of Anarchism (1937), Melzer wrote that White "went to Spain to train and lead the largely Old IRA column in the Connolly section of the International Brigade". According to this account, while White had never accepted the Communist party, in Spain he became thoroughly disillusioned with its leadership and embraced what he now saw as "the alternative": the anarchism of the CNT-FAI and the "irresponsibles" who refused the compromises the libertarian movement had made in support of the Popular Front government.

British Foreign Office and intelligence reports paint a somewhat different picture. At age 57 White entered Spain in October 1936 not as a military trainer but as the administrator for the Spanish Medical Aid Committee. Given the role the CPGB played in setting up the aid committee, it may have been supposition, but they also identify him as having been a Communist party member. In either case, it is clear that once in Spain White fell in with the anarchists of the FAI-CNT.

In a 1936 article, "First Spanish Impressions", White highlights the "revolutionary honour and revolutionary order" among the Catalan workers ("unable to grasp the self-respect of the workers now they are so largely in control", on his first day Barcelona he made the mistake of offering a waiter a tip).

=== "Affinity between Fascist and Communist principles" ===
Witness months earlier than George Orwell to the social revolution that broke out in north-east Spain after the attempted military coup of July 1936, White came to same conclusion the British POUMist reached in his Homage to Catalonia (1938). Consolidating the revolution was a pre-condition to winning the war against fascism, not, as Communists insisted, something that had to be delayed or even reversed until victory was won. Again, like Orwell, he felt able to report "from the inside" on the lengths to which Communist went to "sabotage" everything they were unable to control, and, indeed, to see an "affinity between fascist and communist principles". In his view:

[This affinity between Fascism and Communism] was only modified by the superior power of the latter to obtain the assent of the mind to its own mechanical enslavement. In ruthlessness to heretics, in glorification of hide bound scholasticism supplying ready-made arguments whose repetition is the only safeguard from Inquisition, in docile obedience to higher priests and slavish support of their changes of policy however unprincipled, Communism is [by comparison] a mature and sophisticated philosophy.

=== "Christian Anarchist" ===
In The Meaning of Anarchism, written in the wake of the move by the communists in May 1937 against both the anarchists and independent marxists (POUM), and the subsequent street fighting in Barcelona, White quipped that the anarchists were the more "faithful Marxists": "Did not Marx say, 'The emancipation of the workers must be the work of the workers themselves?'" But to the "element of fatalism" to which Marx's emphasis on "ripening external conditions" gives rise, White contrasted "the unconditioned spontaneity of Anarchism".

Anarchism does not wait. It acts in the individual and in small groups to build up social forms, which shall be, as near as possible, embryos of the fully developed Anarchist society." [...] This voluntarism, scorning to calculate consequences and creative of new mass conditions, is the essence of Anarchism with its distrust of majorities and "l'illusion majoritaire" and its respect of spiritual quality rather than numerical quantity.

White was also to argue that the Spanish anarchists represented a working class more alert than in Ireland—where the central role in the Easter Rising of the "international socialist" James Connolly is "conveniently forgotten"—to the "clerico-fascist menace". Every time the republican movement in Ireland moved toward socialism the "thunder of condemnation and excommunication" from the Roman Catholic Church would cause it to scurry back.

Just returned from Spain, in January 1937 White took the stage with the famous Russian-American anarchist Emma Goldman at a meeting chaired by the novelist, Ethel Mannin to establish the CNT-FAI London Bureau. His speech was published in Vernon Richards's bimonthly Spain and the World, produced by the anarchist Freedom Press. In a second contribution to the journal in March 1937, White professed to "hate all labels", but declared that if he had to have one, "christian anarchist" would be the "nearest fit".

For White, the Gospels "read with any intelligence" spoke to a spirituality of "perfect freedom" wholly at odds with the orthodox insistence on "obedience to the external authority". It embraced the right of the individual "to experiment and judge for himself, above all in those realms of faith and morals where his own soul must find its own unique path". From this standpoint, he suggested, he could have "foretold the association of the Roman Catholic Church with Fascism, not only in Spain, but everywhere else, on philosophical grounds, because that Church and Fascism have the same fundamental philosophy of subordinating individual freedom to the totality of Church and State".

== Later years and death ==
White met his second wife, Nora Shanahan in London in 1936. She was the daughter of a high-ranking government official in Dublin and—like Dollie Mosley before her—a practising Catholic. They were to have three children, Anthony, Alan and Derrick. In 1938, they returned to live in Broughshane where they could supplement his irregular income from journalism with the rent and sale of the land. (When he died, White's entire estate came to just under £82).

White supported Ireland's neutrality in the Second World War and together with the Boer War and Curragh Mutiny veteran, General Hubert Gough, proposed an all-Ireland "People's army of Home Defence". His own offer to serve in the local Home Guard was refused by the Inspector General of the RUC because of his record.

White maintained correspondence with former associates. In 1943, in a letter to the Irish Communist leader Sean Murray, White did not mention anarchism but in identifying the gulf that lay between them described himself as a "spiritist":

I am a spiritist (the word spiritualist suggests too earmarked a sect) and you are a materialist. You believe that the proletariat, gaining control of the instruments of production, is the vehicle of real progress. I, though I do not deny the inevitability, and the desirability, of the class-struggle, regard the triumph of the proletariat as impotent to achieve real progress & doomed...to achieve another loop in the vicious spiral of the intensified slavery of man, unless it vies at the essence of real progress. To me the final dialectic is not the class struggle, but the antithesis of love and death, to be resolved in the synthesis of the conscious triumph of love over death.

White made a final and brief reappearance in public life during the 1945 United Kingdom General Election campaign. Proposing himself as a "Socialist Republican" candidate for the Antrim constituency, he convened a meeting at the local Orange Hall in Broughshane to outline his position. A witness records White directing "a rich vocabulary of language" at, among other targets, Adolf Hitler, Pope Pius XII, Lord Brookborough and Éamon de Valera. He reserved particular contempt for the '”Orange Order, the Unionist Party and the Special Powers Act".

White may have taken his electoral cue from the Socialist Republican Party recently formed in west Belfast. In addition to Nationalist Party dissidents around Harry Diamond (whom White would have known from the Outdoor Relief protests) and ex-IRA volunteers, it included Protestant trade unionists, prominent among them Victor Halley a veteran of the Republican Congress.

In the event, White's name did not reach the ballot paper. He died of cancer six months later, on 2 February 1946. White was buried in Broughshane.

Melzer believed that, embarrassed by his radical politics, White heirs "disposed of his papers" and that much was lost, including drafts of a survey of Irish labour history on which he had collaborated with the Liverpool-Irish anarchist, Matt Kavanagh, and a study of the little known Cork harbour "Soviet" of 1921. The writer Kevin Doyle, who a has authored a play on the subject ("The Burning"), concludes that, either alone or in conjunction with other members of the family, White's second wife, Noreen Shanahan did destroy her husband's papers, and that these may have included a continuation of his biography—White's narrative in Misfit: A Revolutionary Life, published in 1930, ends in 1916.

White's youngest son, Derrick White, became a prominent member of the Scottish National Party and later the Scottish Socialist Party.

== In fiction ==
White recognised himself as the character Jim Bricknell in D. H. Lawrence's novel Aaron's Rod (1922). A house guest, Bricknell argues with his host, Rawdon Lily, first about Christ and love and later about Bricknell's impending liaison with a young woman. Omitting only to identify the woman in question as Bricknell's hostess (Lawrence's wife Frieda) and that their flirtation occasioned an altercation in which the guest actually struck his host, White accepted the narrative as an account of his encounter with the Lawrence in 1918. As such, his biographer, Leo Keohane, suggests it highlights White's characterisation of sexual love as something akin to war, a metaphor that White extended as "the sex problem writ large" to Irish politics (Protestantism having what he perceived to be male attributes and Catholicism female). In the novel, Lawrence describes Bricknell as "a sort of socialist and a red hot revolutionary of a very ineffectual sort".

Another acquaintance satirized by Lawrence in Aaron's Rod was the American novelist H.D. In her thinly disguised roman à clef Bid Me to Live (written in 1927, published in 1960), White appears as Captain Ned Trent, an Irish drifter adopted by leading wartime members of London's Bloomsbury Group, among them characters readily identified as Lawrence and his wife, Ezra Pound, Richard Adlington and, in the heroine Julia Ashton, H. D. herself.

Misfit, a one-act play by Myles Morgan that follows White from the Boer War to the Spanish Civil War, was performed at the Cork Arts Theatre in June 2010.

== Published writing ==
- "Protestantism and Home Rule", Irish Review, January 1913.
- The Significance of Sinn Féin: Psychological, Political, and Economic, Dublin: Martin Lester, 1919.
- Misfit: A Revolutionary Life (1930), Livewire Publications, 2005. ISBN 978-1-905225-20-0
- "Where Casement would have stood today - Address to the Roger Casement Sinn Fein Club, Dublin", 1936.
- "A Rebel in Barcelona: Jack White's First Spanish lmpressions", CNT-FAI Bulletin de Informacion, No 15, November 1936.
- "Anarchism — A Philosophy Of Action", Spain And The World, 5 February 1937 (speech made by at a meeting of CNT-FAI London Bureau at Conway Hall, 18 January 1937).
- "The Church: Fascism's Ally. An Interpretation of Christianity", Spain And The World, 5 March 1937
- The Meaning of Anarchism: Theory Illuminated by Recent Practice in Spain, (1937), London: London Freedom Group, 1980.
