= Rosamond Jacob =

Irish writer and political activist

- Róisín Nic Sheamuis
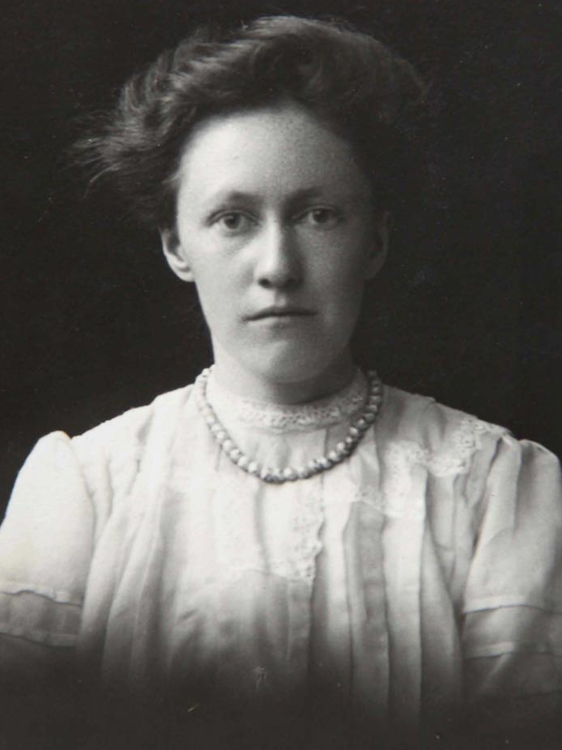
- Jacob in May, 1912
- Born: Rosamond Jacob; 13 October 1888; South Parade, Waterford, Ireland
- Died: 11 October 1960 (aged 71); Dublin, Ireland
- Occupations: Writer, activist
- Writing career
- Pen name: F. Winthrop

Rosamond Jacob (13 October 1888 – 11 October 1960) was an Irish writer and political activist. She was a lifelong activist for suffragist, republican and socialist causes and a writer of fiction.

== Early life ==
She was born to lapsed Quaker parents, Lewis Jacob and Henrietta Harvey, in Waterford, where she lived until 1920. Her parents' support for Irish Nationalism placed them at odds with the majority of the Quaker community in Waterford and resulted in isolation. Rosamond was educated in Quaker schools in Waterford and amongst other things through this became proficient in languages such as French and German.

== Political activism ==
=== Pre-War of Independence ===
As a young adult Jacob become involved in organisations such as the Gaelic League, the Irish National League, and Inghinidhe na hÉireann, a dedicated women's radical nationalist organisation. She, along with her brother Tom, was a member of Sinn Féin from 1905, and it was Rosamond who opened the first branch of Sinn Féin in Waterford in 1906. It was that same year Rosamond became an Irish language speaker and writer, a language she'd go on to become fluent in. Jacob's time in the Gaelic League over time began to grate, however, as she began to find the Catholic atmosphere there stifling to her developing feminist and agonist beliefs. In 1908 she joined the Irish Women's Franchise League, created by her friend and fellow feminist Hanna Sheehy-Skeffington.

In the 1910s she opposed World War I on the grounds that it was an "imperialist war" and demonstrated against attempts to recruit Irish men for the British army by John Redmond. Around the same time she joined Cumann na mBan and from inside the organisation was critical of its restrained stance towards Redmond. During this period Jacob also stood critical of the Third Home Rule Bill, as the grounds it contained nothing towards the suffrage of women.

Jacob remained active in Waterford, supporting and leading groups such as Friends’ Relief, a Quaker charity group, and she was elected secretary of the Committee for social reform in Waterford, which sought to address local problems such as gambling and alcoholism. In 1917 she represented Waterford at that year's Sinn Féin Ard Fheis, where she forced more commitment towards women's suffrage. During the 1918 Irish general election she canvassed on behalf of Éamon de Valera, but upon the meeting of the First Dáil was disappointed in its lack of female representation.

=== Post-War of Independence ===
Jacob opposed the Anglo-Irish Treaty of 1921 and supported cause the Anti-Treaty IRA in the Irish Civil War, however, she sought peace above all, as did many in the labour movement. In July 1922 she alongside Maud Gonne led women activists in calling for a ceasefire between both sides, however, their call went ignored. In 1923 Jacob was arrested and imprisoned at Mountjoy Prison upon the government discovering that Sinn Féin's publicity department was based out of Hanna Sheehy-Skeffington's house, where Jacob was living. It was during this time she shared a cell with Dorothy Macardle, now also firmly on the Republican side. She became close friends with Macardle and shared a flat on Herbert Place, Ballsbridge with her later in the 1920s.

Between 1920 and 1927, Jacob was secretary of the Irishwomen's International League, which had begun life in 1916 as the Irish branch of the Women's International League for Peace and Freedom (WILPF). She and her colleague Lucy Kingston were the two Irish delegates to the Third International Women's Congress for Peace and Freedom in Vienna in 1921. She was among the organisers of the congress held in Dublin in 1926. It was also in 1926 that she followed De Valera and Countess Markievicz and their supporters out of Sinn Féin and into the Fianna Fáil party following a split over the policy of using Abstentionism against Dáil Éireann. In 1927 Jacob resigned as secretary of the Irish branch of the WILPF but went on to attend the organisation's congress in Prague in 1929 accompanied by Hanna Sheehy-Skeffington.

In the 1930s found herself increasingly unhappy with the independent Irish state, finding it oppressive, patriarchal, and overtly Catholic. In the face of this, she continued to throw herself into political and social activism. She joined the International Disarmament Declaration Committee as well as tried to create an organisation to oppose Capital Punishment in Ireland. In 1931 she travelled to Russia as a delegate of the Irish Friends of Soviet Russia, and upon her return to Dublin reportedly favourable on conditions there.

It was in the 1920s and 1930s that Jacob was involved in a relationship with fellow republican Frank Ryan. She played a leading role in the political campaign to secure Ryan's freedom from Nationalist Spain, and later worked to defend his reputation after news of his death in Nazi Germany became known.

== Writing ==
Jacob's first novel, called Callaghan, was published in 1920. It had actually been written in 1915, however, it took Jacob five years to find a publisher willing to take a chance on her. Callaghan was published under the pseudonym of "F. Winthrop". The novel details a romantic relationship between a Protestant Suffragist and a Catholic Nationalist.

In 1937 Jacob wrote and published The Rise of the United Irishmen, 1791–1794, an historical analysis of the United Irishmen. It was praised as insightful and for Jacob clearly differentiating her own views from those of the book's subjects. The success of that book allowed her to find a publisher for 1938 novel The Troubled House, which had been written in 1921. The novel was set during the Irish War of Independence and it offers an avant-garde critique of war and patriarchy while strongly suggesting a lesbian relationship between two of its protagonists.

In 1957 Jacob wrote The Rebel's Wife, a historical memoir written from the viewpoint of Wolfe Tone's wife Matilda, but she was unable to find a publisher for it until she rewrote it as a historical fiction.

== Later life ==
She lived in the Rathmines area of Dublin from at least 1942, firstly in Belgrave Square. From 1950 she shared a house with her friend Lucy Kingston at 17 Charleville Road. In September 1960 she was struck by a car while walking in Dublin and died two weeks later in hospital. Rosamond Jacob kept a diary almost all of her life, and there are 171 of these diaries among her literary and political papers held in the National Library of Ireland.

== Published works ==
- Callaghan 1920 (as F. Winthrop)
- The Rise of the United Irishmen 1791-94 1927
- The Troubled House 1938
- The Rebel's Wife 1957
- The Raven's Glen 1960

== Biographies ==
- Lane, Dr Leeann (2010), Rosamond Jacob - Third Person Singular. UCD Press.
