= Lillie Connolly =

Irish domestic servant

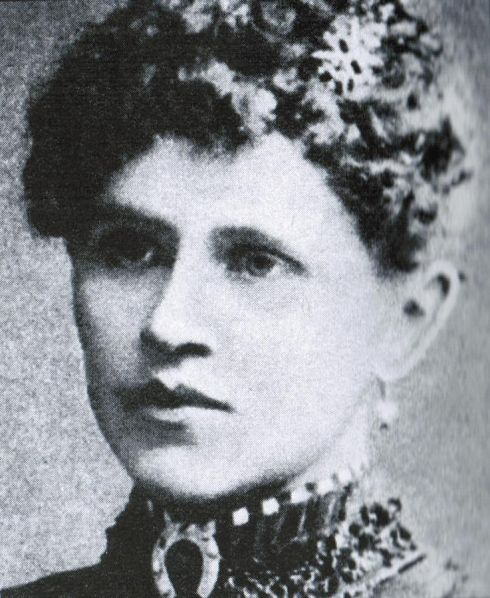
- Born: Lillie Agnes Reynolds; 1867 or 1868; Carnew, County Wicklow, Ireland
- Died: 22 January 1938 (aged 70–71); Rathmines, Dublin, Republic of Ireland
- Spouse: James Connolly (m. 1890; died 1916)
- Children: 7, including Nora and Roddy

Lillie Connolly (née Reynolds; 1867 or 1868 – 22 January 1938) was an Irish socialist and trade union organiser. She was the wife of James Connolly, the Irish revolutionary who was involved in the 1916 Easter Rising.

== Early life ==
The year of Connolly's birth remains uncertain but it is believed that she was born in 1867 or 1868 in Carnew, in County Wicklow, Lillie Agnes Reynolds. Her family was Protestant. Her father was John, a farm labourer, and Margaret Reynolds (née Newman). Connolly was the fourth child in the family and she had an older sister named Maggie who was born in 1861, and identical twin brothers, Johnny and George who were born in 1863. When her father died, the family moved to Rathmines, Dublin.

== Education and career ==
Connolly was a member of the Girls Friendly Society in the Church of Ireland. This society, organised by the church itself, was set up to help girls particularly from rural Ireland to find some sort of employment. This organisation found Connolly work as a domestic servant with William and Anne Wilson in Dublin. Mr Wilson was a stockbroker and notary public. He and his family lived at 35 Merrion Square East, Dublin. During the time that Connolly worked for this family, she rose from her position as a maid to that of a governess to the couple's younger children. In 1887 or 1888, Connolly met James Connolly who at that time was in the British Army stationed in Ireland. They corresponded for a number of years after James returned to Scotland, and Connolly sent money to James to support him and his family.

== Family life ==
=== Life in Scotland ===
Connolly moved to Scotland around 1889, arriving in Perth, where she believed James had been living. By the time she arrived he had moved to Dundee. She moved as she had the expectation of marriage, which seemed to surprise James, and he did not immediately travel to meet her. She left Perth to move to London to find employment. They were married in St John the Baptist Church, Perth, on 30 April 1890, having been granted dispensation by the Catholic Bishop of Dunkeld. Following their marriage, they moved to Edinburgh and lived at 22 West Port in the Grassmarket area. James worked as a labourer and then as a manure carter with Edinburgh Corporation.

They had seven children (six daughters and one son), with six of them reaching adulthood:

- Mona, born 11 April 1891
- Nora, born 14 November 1892
- Aideen, born 3 March 1896
- Ina Mary (Mollie), born in November 1896
- Moria Elizabeth, born 1 January 1899
- Roderick James (Roddy), born 11 February 1901
- Fiona, born 22 August 1907

During the first 4 years of their marriage, the Connollys moved 5 times to different addresses in Edinburgh. Their home at 6 Lothian Street became the centre for local socialist meetings. Owing to her better education, Connolly helped her husband's speeches and writing. She shunned the public aspects of her husband's work entirely, only attending one meeting only to flee when he took the stage out of fear. By 1895 the Connollys' financial situation was so straitened that they considered emigrating to Chile.

=== Life in Dublin ===
The family returned to Dublin in May 1896 as paid organiser of the Dublin Socialist Society, first living on Queen Street and later at 76 Charlemont Street. Despite the family's poverty and the tenements in which they lived, her children recalled Connolly as maintaining a very neat appearance and being inventive in her reuse of materials to ensure the longevity of their belongings and clothing. After the premature birth of her daughter, Ina, in November 1896, Connolly visited with her former employers the Wilsons with her new baby. During this period the Connollys were very poor, and Connolly hid from her husband the various ways in which she was lent and given money to pay the rent and for food. In 1897, Connolly met Maud Gonne after James was arrested. James founded the Irish Socialist Republican Party in May 1896, and in 1898 The Workers' Republic newspaper, the first Irish Socialist paper, from their home at number 54 Pimlico.

=== Emigration to the United States ===
In the Autumn of 1903, James Connolly thought that he and his family would be better off living in the United States, due to the little progress the Irish Socialist Party was making. He went ahead on his own, and it took some months to save enough money to rent a house and send tickets for his family to join him, which he was able to do in July 1904. This followed a two month period during which Connolly was seriously ill, when her husband feared she would die. Their daughter, Mona, died on 4 August 1904 on the eve of their planned departure for the United States, after an accident in which her apron caught on fire while she was working in the kitchen. The Connollys never recovered from this tragedy. Connolly and her other children passed through Ellis Island a few days later in August 1904, being reunited with her husband. The family lived in a large house at 76 Ingalls Avenue, later moving to Newark. The family moved to The Bronx in 1907, where Connolly worked as a washerwoman to supplement her husband's unstable earnings.

=== Return to Ireland ===
In 1910, the family moved back to Ireland when James was offered a job as organiser in James Larkin's Irish Transport and General Workers' Union, living in the South Lotts Road in Ringsend. Connolly and the children moved to Belfast to help secure employment for their daughters, Nora and Ina. They lived at 1 Glenalina Terrace near the Falls Road. For a period, James lived at Constance Markievicz's home in Dublin. James would travel up to east Ulster every weekend. When her husband went on hunger strike while he was imprisoned during the 1913 Lockout, Connolly travelled from Belfast to the Mansion House and successfully demanded that Lord Aberdeen order his release. Connolly found life in Belfast hard, and became very isolated despite her daughters' best efforts.

== Easter Rising ==
James became more active in revolutionary politics and played a central role in the 1916 Easter Rising. Just before the Rising, Connolly sold what possessions the family had had and moved back to Dublin from Belfast, staying at Markievicz's cottage at Ticknock. Both Nora and Ina were involved in preparations for the Rising, with Connolly giving them £1 each beforehand. Connolly and James argued about their son, Roddy, taking part in the Rising which he ultimately did. From the cottage, Connolly saw large parts of central Dublin burn as the rebellion unfolded. When both her husband and son were arrested after their surrender Connolly returned to Dublin, living with William O'Brien and his family. Connolly feared that Roddy could be sentenced to death, but he was released after 8 days due to his young age. Connolly visited her husband in Dublin Castle, first accompanied by Fiona, and then again by Nora on 11 May. During the second visit, James told her he had been sentenced to death, to which she responded "But your beautiful life, Jim, your beautiful life!" Connolly became so distraught she had to be removed from his room by a nurse.

James was executed on 12 May 1916. Following his death, Connolly was visited by a young, teenage soldier who claimed to have been in her husband's firing squad. She comforted him, and told him he did not need her forgiveness. Like the other widows of the executed leaders, Connolly was prevented from claiming her husband's body for burial. She was also unsuccessful in claiming his belongings, having just his wallet returned. The Connollys remained with the O'Briens, though they were aware that they were an increasing burden. They received a number of individual donations, including from George Bernard Shaw.

Three months later Connolly received £50 from the Irish Volunteer Dependants Fund as 3 members of the family were working. She also accepted funds from the White Cross, but in 1920 refused a pension from the Irish Transport and General Workers' Union. Connolly became a Catholic on 15 August 1916. James had been a Roman Catholic and before his death he had asked her to become a Catholic. They raised their children as Catholics. Connolly did attempt to return to the United States with her family, as her husband had wanted, but their passport application was refused.

== Later life ==
After James' execution, Connolly kept out of the limelight and spent her time occupied with family and domestic affairs, returning to live in Rathmines in 1923, living at 36 Belgrave Square. She often visited Pimlico during this time. She was awarded a military pension, which paid for the education of her youngest daughter, Fiona. Their daughter Nora became interested in politics as an adult, and she and her husband Seamus worked with the Labour Party. Both Roddy and Ina were also involved in politics during their father's lifetime and after. When Roddy's wife died in 1930, he and their young sons lived with Connolly.

Towards the end of 1937, she attended a children's dancing festival which was her last public event. On 23 December, The Irish Press reported that she had fallen ill and doctors were attending her at her home. She died four weeks later on 22 January 1938 at the age of 71. She had a state funeral in Dublin on 29 January 1938. The Irish Times reporting on her funeral wrote: "Throughout her life the late Mrs Connolly appeared but rarely in public. She was of the most retiring and modest disposition, home-loving and devoted to the welfare of her family". The Irish Press stated:

"Lillie Connolly lived a hard life but she was satisfied that it should be so because she knew, even when her children were hungry and her husband unemployed, when the fire was small and everything that could be sold was gone, that this was all to be suffered in the cause of changing the miserable lives of the workers and the poor and making the world a better place for all."
