= Women's Social and Progressive League =

Irish women's organization

- Founder: Hanna Sheehy-Skeffington
- Founded: 1937
- Dissolved: c. mid 1950s
- Ideology: Feminism; Social Liberalism; Progressivism

The Women's Social and Progressive League was a women's organisation and political party founded in Ireland in 1937 by Hanna Sheehy-Skeffington. It was committed to opposing the 1937 constitution of Ireland and any regressive consequences it would entail; the organisation opposed articles 40, 41, and 45 concerning the status of women. Among its most prominent members were Dorothy Macardle, Lorna Reynolds, Mary Hayden, Mary J. Hogan, Mary Macken, Mary S. Kettle and Agnes O'Farrelly.

The party ran candidates in the 1938 Irish general election as well as the 1943 Irish general election.

== See also ==
- Róisín Walsh
