= Lorna Reynolds =

Irish writer, editor, and professor

- Born: Lorna Reynolds; 17 December 1911; Jamaica
- Died: 4 July 2003 (aged 91); Dublin, Ireland

Lorna Reynolds (17 December 1911 – 4 July 2003) was an Irish writer, editor, and professor.

== Early life and education ==
Reynolds was born in Jamaica in 1911 to staff sergeant Michael Reynolds in the Royal Engineers and his wife Teresa Hickey. She was one of five children. Her father died when she was ten.

In 1912, her family returned from the Caribbean to live in Birr, County Offaly. After three years they moved to Dublin, Ireland.

Reynolds was educated in the Dominican College, Eccles Street. She went on to get her three degrees from University College Dublin. Reynolds studied English and graduated with a BA in 1933, her MA in 1935 and finally her PhD in 1940. She then became a lecturer in UCD where she worked for thirty years.

== Career ==
In 1966 Reynolds was appointed Professor of Modern English at University College Galway. She worked as an editor as well as her academic work. She was editor of the University Review and co-edited several volumes of Yeats Studies with Robert O’Driscoll of the University of Toronto. Reynolds wrote a biography of Kate O’Brien, her lifelong friend. She also wrote poetry and short stories, and was a contributor to The Bell, Poetry Ireland Review, Arena, The Lace Curtain and Botteghe Oscure. Her recipes were published in 1990. She was responsible for organising the J. M. Synge centenary conference in 1971. She took a sabbatical to Toronto due to her work with O'Driscoll where she was attached to St. Michael's College.

Also an activist Reynolds mobilised a campaign to try to restore the Georgian theatre in Eyrecourt, County Galway, she was a member of the Women's Social and Progressive League in the 1940s as well as involved in the Anti-Censorship Board. Reynolds was also very involved in the UCD Women Graduates' Association. She returned to Dublin when she retired in 1978. She died in 2003 and is buried in Clonoghill Cemetery, Birr.

== Bibliography ==
- Kate O'Brien: A Literary Portrait
- Tasty Food for Hasty Folk (1990)

=== Editor ===
- Robert O'Driscoll; Lorna Reynolds (1975). Yeats and the theatre. Maclean-Hunter Press. ISBN 978-0-7705-1228-6.
- The Untold Story: The Irish in Canada (1988)
- Lorna Reynolds, ed. (1945). The Land of Poetry: An Anthology for Irish Schools. The National Press.
