= Derrick White (politician) =

Irish writer and political activist

Derrick O'Clancy White
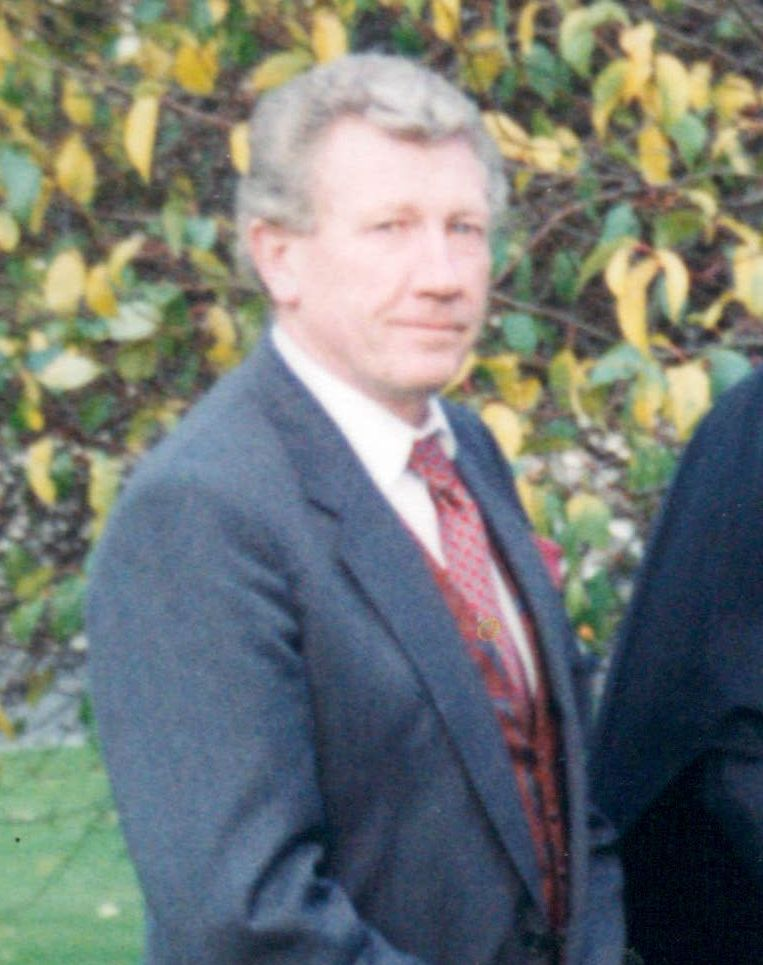
- Derrick White in Trinity College Dublin, 1995
- Born: 7 July 1942; Ballymena, Northern Ireland
- Died: 5 September 2007 (aged 65); Caceres, Spain

Derrick O'Clancy White (7 July 1942 – 5 September 2007) was a writer and political activist originally from Dublin who was a parliamentary candidate initially for the Scottish National Party and then latterly for the Scottish Socialist Party in the Lothians.

== Early life ==
White was the youngest of three sons of Captain Jack White (1879–1946), one of the co-founders in the great Dublin lock-out of 1913 of the Irish Citizen Army and a veteran of numerous left-wing organisations, and grandson of Field Marshal Sir George White VC, who was known for holding Ladysmith during its siege during the Boer War. His maternal great-grandfather was J.J. Clancy and his paternal great-grandfather was Joseph Baly.

White's father died when he was three. After attending Blackrock College in County Dublin, White joined the Royal Navy as a boy recruit at the former HMS Ganges in Suffolk. After service in the navy as a communications specialist and marksman, he returned for a short time to Dublin around 1970, variously driving an ambulance for a specialist cardiac service and working in a health club.

White then moved to Scotland, where he launched health clubs in Glasgow and Edinburgh, which operated successfully for a decade. When these businesses dissolved he moved to England for several years, working for the multinational company, Canon, in training and recruitment before returning to Scotland, where he set up his own training consultancy.

== Political activity ==
During the 1990s White became active in the Scottish National Party, standing as its candidate for the Westminster parliamentary seat of Edinburgh East and Musselburgh in 1997, where he took a 19% share of the vote.

Becoming disillusioned with the SNP, he joined the Scottish Socialist Party, this time standing for the Scottish Parliament seat of Edinburgh East and Musselburgh in 1999 and the Westminster seat of East Lothian in 2001. White remained a member of the Scottish Socialist Party.

White wrote a series of books on training, sales, personality profiling, and psychometric testing, and numerous articles on politics for the Scottish Left Review. White was also frequent contributor to The Glasgow Herald's letters page, specialising in attacks on what he saw as political hypocrisy. His last published book, Scotland, Frequently Asked Questions: What Every Visitor Needs to Know (2004), is a humorous exploration of the sore points of Scottish history and psychology.

== Later life ==
Prior to his death he had completed a further book, giving a tongue-in-cheek view of what's wrong with Britain and justifying his move to Spain. White died of cancer in Spain on 5 September 2007.
