= G. J. Renier =

Gustaaf Johannes Petrus Renier (25 September 1892 – 1 September 1962) was professor of Dutch History at University College London.

== Early life ==
Renier was born in Flushing, the child of Johanna Maria Elisabeth Renier and the maritime pilot Peter Paul Renier, both natives of Flushing. He was sent to school in Antwerp and Leuven, and studied history at the University of Ghent, beginning a doctorate under Henri Pirenne.

== Career ==
At the outbreak of the First World War he fled to England, working as a journalist, biographer and translator, and became London editor of Nieuwe Courant, began his PhD at University College in 1921, completing his doctoral thesis on 19th century Anglo-Dutch relations in 1930, under Pieter Geyl. In 1939, Renier was a BBC contract staff member. In 1936, he succeeded Geyl as Reader in Dutch History at University College London, retiring in 1957.

In contrast to his former advisor, Geyl, he took the view that Dutch and Belgian nationhood were highly distinct.

== Personal life ==
On 17 May 1923, he married the Irish novelist Kate O'Brien, but the marriage ended within a year, and divorced 1925. O'Brien left Bilbao after less than a year, returning to London because of her sudden decision to marry Renier, the marriage only lasted eleven months.

Renier died on 1 September 1962 in Twickenham.

== Works ==
- Great Britain and the Establishment of the Kingdom of the Netherlands, 1813-1815 (1930)
- The English: are They Human?. Williams & Norgate. 1931.
- The Ill-fated Princess: The Life of Charlotte, Daughter of the Prince Regent (1932)
- William of Orange (1932)
- Oscar Wilde (1933)
- He Came to England (1933)
- Robespierre (1936)
- The Criterion of Dutch Nationhood: An Inaugural Lecture Delivered at University College, London on June 4, 1945. G. Allen & Unwin. 1946.
- History, its Purpose and Method (Boston: Beacon Press, 1950) (Routledge, March 2018)
