= James Fearon (trade unionist) =

Irish trade unionist and socialist activist

- Born: July 29, 1874; Newry, County Down, Ireland
- Died: 24 October 1924 (aged 50); Glasgow, Scotland
- Occupations: Trade unionist, socialist activist
- Known for: Founding member and first Vice President of the Irish Transport and General Workers’ Union

James Fearon (29 July 1874 – 24 October 1924) was an Irish trade unionist and socialist activist, best known as one of the founding figures of the Irish Transport and General Workers' Union (ITGWU). Often referred to as "the third James", alongside James Larkin and James Connolly, Fearon played a prominent role in organising unskilled labourers in both Ireland and Scotland during the early 20th century.

== Early life ==
James Fearon was born on Castle Street, Newry, County Down, in July 1874. He was one of seven children and was orphaned after his father, a grain mill worker, died in suspicious circumstances due to suffocation at work. He served for a time in the British Army before settling in Glasgow, where he became involved in socialist politics.

== Trade union activism ==
Fearon first encountered Jim Larkin in Glasgow, where Larkin, then an organiser for the National Union of Dock Labourers (NUDL), had taken a job on the docks to recruit new members. Fearon, a teetotaller like Larkin, impressed him with his commitment and political interests. The two became close collaborators.

Fearon became secretary of the Glasgow branch of the NUDL and was later responsible for repatriating the body of a fellow worker to Newry. Following this, he remained in the town and founded a local branch of the union. On 27 September 1907, the Newry branch of the NUDL was formally established, with Fearon appointed as secretary. He led a dock strike soon afterwards and took direct action to prevent strikebreaking, including marching workers from Newry to Warrenpoint and scaling gasworks walls to encourage sympathy action. His actions drew hostility from employers, local newspapers, and elements of the Catholic clergy. The strike was ultimately broken, but some gains were secured.

== Founding of the ITGWU ==
In December 1908, Fearon and Larkin broke from the NUDL, primarily over tensions with British leadership such as James Sexton, and co-founded the Irish Transport and General Workers’ Union. Fearon was appointed its first Vice President. He played a key role in organising dock strikes and labour militancy in cities including Cork, Belfast, Dublin, Drogheda and Waterford. In Cork, he helped establish a workers’ militia, which Larkin later credited as an inspiration for the Irish Citizen Army.

== Work in Glasgow and Newry ==
Following Larkin's departure to the United States, Fearon returned to Glasgow, where he worked among migrant labourers in the city's Model Lodging Houses. He helped found the unemployed movement in Scotland and campaigned for improved housing and working conditions. After the First World War, he returned to Newry and resumed his activism with the Amalgamated Transport and General Workers Union, continuing to campaign for workers and the unemployed.

== Political involvement ==
Fearon was a founding member of the Communist Party of Ireland and worked closely with Roddy Connolly, son of James Connolly. He supported Larkin's efforts to regain control of the ITGWU in the early 1920s.

== Death and legacy ==
James Fearon died in Glasgow on 24 October 1924 after a period of illness. He was buried with the Red Flag draped over his coffin in what became one of the largest working-class funerals of the period in the city. His contributions are commemorated in the naming of Fearon Hall, the ITGWU union hall on Merchant's Quay in Newry. A SIPTU banner bearing his image was unveiled in Liberty Hall, Dublin, in 2010.
