= Kate O'Brien (novelist) =

Irish novelist, playwright and activist (1897–1974)

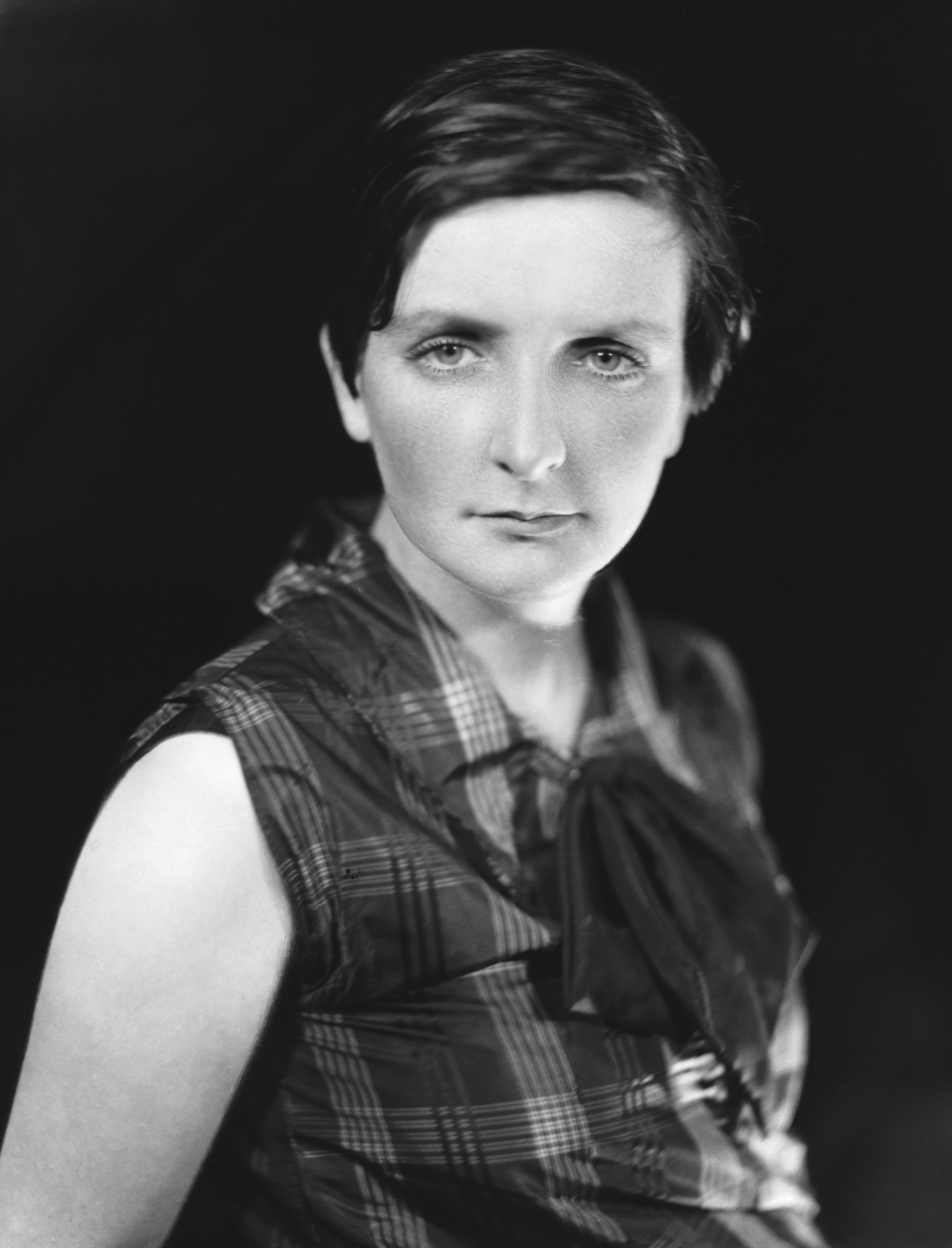
- O’Brien in 1926
- Born: Kathleen Mary Louise O'Brien; 3 December 1897; Limerick, Ireland
- Died: 13 August 1974 (aged 76); Canterbury, England
- Occupations: Novelist and playwright

Kate O'Brien (3 December 1897 – 13 August 1974) was an Irish novelist and playwright.

== Biography ==
Kathleen Mary Louise "Kate" O'Brien was born in Limerick in 1897 to a middle-class family. Following the death of her mother when she was five, she joined her three older sisters as a boarder at Laurel Hill Convent becoming the youngest pupil at the school. She graduated in 1919 in English and French from the newly established University College Dublin, and she then moved to London, where she worked as a teacher for a year.

In 1922–23, she worked as a governess in Bilbao in the Basque Country of Spain, where she began to write fiction. Upon her return to England, O'Brien worked at the Manchester Guardian. She married Dutch journalist Gustaff Reiner in 1922 but the marriage ended within a year. After the success of her play Distinguished Villa in 1926, she took to full-time writing and was awarded both the 1931 James Tait Black Memorial Prize and the Hawthornden Prize for her debut novel Without My Cloak.

Many of her books deal with issues of female agency and sexuality in ways that were new and radical at the time. Her 1936 novel, Mary Lavelle, was banned in Ireland and Spain, while The Land of Spices was banned in Ireland upon publication. In addition to novels, she wrote plays, film scripts, short stories, essays, copious journalism, two biographical studies, and two very personal travelogues. Throughout her life, O'Brien felt a particular affinity with Spain—while her experiences in the Basque Country inspired Mary Lavelle, she also wrote a life of the Spanish mystic Teresa of Avila, and she used the relationship between the Spanish king Philip II and Maria de Mendoza to write the anti-fascist novel That Lady.

Even though Kate O'Brien lived outside of Ireland for most of her adult life, the country played a crucial role in her creative output. Many of her novels are set in Ireland, in 'Mellick' which is her fictional name for Limerick. She lived in Roundstone in Connemara for a period in the 1950s. She wrote a regular newspaper column for the Irish Times entitled From a Distance which captured the ambivalent relationship she had with Ireland. In her novels after 1936, she is outspokenly critical of the conservatism of the new Irish State, particularly during the De Valera years. Her work promoted European identity, which she saw as being rooted in the Christian tradition—despite the fact that she was herself agnostic.

O'Brien wrote a political travelogue, Farewell Spain, to gather support for the leftist cause in the Spanish Civil War, and it has been argued that she was close to anarchism in the 1930s. She also wrote a travelogue My Ireland (1962), where she offers a lively and engaging record of the places in Ireland that she loved (such as Connemara) or did not impress her (such as Dublin).

A feminist, her novels promoted gender equality and were mostly protagonised by young women yearning for independence. Kate O'Brien's determination to encourage a greater understanding of sexual difference – several of her books include positive gay/lesbian characters — make her a pioneer in queer literary representation. O'Brien was herself lesbian, and had a number of relationships with women, including the novelist E.M. Delafield, and the artist Mary O'Neill, who has been described as her 'life partner'. She was very critical of conservatism in Ireland, and the banning of her books highlighted the Irish censorship laws. Following a debate on the banning of The Land of Spices in the Irish senate, and a campaign supported by Seán Ó Faoláin and others, the censorship laws were somewhat reformed in 1946 by creating an Appeals Board. The Land of Spices which had been banned in 1941 was 'unbanned' in 1949, but Mary Lavelle was never officially 'unbanned'. In this way, O'Brien helped bring to an end the cultural restrictions of the 1930s and 40s in the country. She lived much of her life in England and died in Faversham, near Canterbury, in 1974. At the time of her death, she was poor and most of her books were out of print. In the 1980s, her work was recovered by feminist scholars and reprinted by feminist publishers such as Arlen House in Dublin and Virago in London. She is now considered to be a major twentieth-century Irish writer.

== Legacy ==
The Glucksman Library at the University of Limerick holds an important collection of O'Brien's writings.

In August 2005, Penguin reissued her final novel, As Music and Splendour (1958), which had been out of print for decades.

The Limerick Literary Festival in honour of Kate O’Brien (formerly the Kate O'Brien Weekend), takes place in Limerick every year, attracting academic and non-academic audiences.

In the classic film Brief Encounter (1945), the co-protagonist Laura (Celia Johnson) says she has reserved "the new Kate O'Brien" at her local Boots library, which prepares the audience for the moral dilemmas that the character is about to face.

== Works ==
=== Fiction ===
- Without My Cloak (1931) – winner of the James Tait Black Prize and Hawthornden Prize
- The Ante-Room (1934)
- Mary Lavelle (1936) – adapted as the 1998 film Talk of Angels)
- Pray for the Wanderer (1938)
- The Land of Spices (1941)
- The Last of Summer (1943)
- That Lady (1946) – later a 1949 Broadway show and a 1955 movie
- The Flower of May (1953) – named Book of the Year award by the Women Writers Association in Ireland
- As Music and Splendour (1958)
- Constancy – two chapters of an unfinished novel, published in 1972

=== Plays ===
- Distinguished Villa: A Play in Three Acts (1926)
- Gloria Gish – in the archive of the National Library of Ireland
- The Anteroom – an adaptation of her novel
- That Lady: A Romantic Drama (1949) – an adaptation of her novel

=== Film scripts ===
- Mary Magdalen – n.d., one version at the archive of the National Library of Ireland
- A Broken Song – n.d., Kate O'Brien Papers at University of Limerick
- Kate O'Brien: Self-Portrait – documentary for RTÉ television, broadcast 28 March 1962

=== Nonfiction ===
- Farewell Spain (1937) – political travelogue
- English Diaries and Journals (1943) – literary criticism
- Teresa of Avila (1951) – biography
- Dublin and Cork (1961) – photographic book with text by O'Brien
- My Ireland (1962) – travelogue
- Presentation Parlour (1963) – biography
- Long Distance (1967-71) – column for The Irish Times newspaper
- book reviews – see E. Walshe's Ordinary People Dancing for Listings

== Critical studies on O'Brien ==
- John Jordan (editor): Special issue on Kate O'Brien, Stony Thursday Book, vol. 7, 1981
- Lorna Reynolds: Kate O'Brien: A Literary Portrait (1987)
- John Logan (editor): With Warmest Love: Lectures for Kate O'Brien 1984–93. (1994)
- Adele M. Dalsimer: Kate O'Brien: A Critical Study (1990)
- Éibhear Walshe (editor): Ordinary People Dancing: Essays on Kate O'Brien (1993)
- Éibhear Walshe: Kate O'Brien: A Writing Life (2006)
- Mary Coll (editor): Faithful Companions: Collected Essays Celebrating the 25th Anniversary of the Kate O'Brien Weekend. (2009)
- Aintzane L. Mentxaka: Kate O'Brien and the Fiction of Identity (2011)
- Michael G. Cronin: Impure Thoughts: sexuality, Catholicism and literature in twentieth-century Ireland. Manchester: Manchester University Press. (2012)
- Aintzane L. Mentxaka: The Postcolonial Traveller: Kate O'Brien and the Basques (2016)
- Jane Davison: Kate O'Brien and Spanish Literary Culture (2017)
- Paige Reynolds (editor): Special Issue on Kate O'Brien, Irish University Review (Spring/Summer 2018)

== Critical essays on O'Brien ==
- Joan Ryan: "Class and Creed in the Novels of Kate O'Brien" in M. Harmon (editor): The Irish Writer and the City (1984)
- Lorna Reynolds: "The Image of Spain in the Novels of Kate O'Brien" in W. Zack and H Kosok (editors): National Images and Stereotypes (1988)
- Emma Donoghue. "'Out of Order': Kate O'Brien's Lesbian Fictions". in Ordinary People Dancing: Essays on Kate O'Brien. Eibhear Walshe ed. Cork: Cork University Press, 1993, pp. 36–59.
- Anne C. Fogarty: "The Ear of the Other: Dissident Voices in Kate O'Brien's As Music and Splendor and Mary Dorcey's A Noise From the Woodshed" in Éibhear Walshe (editor): Sex, Nation and Dissent in Irish Writing (1997)
- Gerardine Meaney. "Territory and Transgression – History, Nationality and Sexuality in Kate O’Brien’s Fiction". Irish Journal of Feminist Studies. Col. 2, issue 2 (December 1997): 77–92.
- Eamon Maher: "Love and the Loss of Faith in the Novels of Kate O'Brien" in Crosscurrents and Confluences (2000)
- Angela Ryan:"'A Franco-Irish Solution?' Francois Mauriac, Kate O'Brien and the Catholic Intellectual Novel". in France and Ireland: Anatomy of a Relationship. Ed E. Maher and G. Neville. Frankfurt: Peter Lang, 2004: 97–109.
- Sharon Tighe-Mooney. "Sexuality and Religion in Kate O’Brien’s Novels". Essays in Irish Literary Criticism: Gender, Sexuality, and Corporeality. Deirdre Quinn and Sharon Tighe-Mooney eds. Lewiston, New York, Queenston, and Lampeter: Edwin Mellen Press, 2008, pp. 125–140.
- Aintzane L. Mentxaka. "La Belle – Kate O’Brien and Female Beauty". in Women, Social and Cultural Change in Twentieth Century Ireland: Dissenting Voices?. Sarah O’Connor and Christopher C. Shepard eds. Newcastle: Cambridge Scholars' Press, 2008, pp. 183– 198.
- Aintzane L. Mentxaka. "A 'Catholic Agnostic' – Kate O’Brien". in Breaking the Mould: Literary Representations of Irish Catholicism. Eamon Maher and Eugene O’Brien eds. Peter Lang, 2011. 87–104* Aintzane L. Mentxaka. "Politics and Feminism: The Basque Contexts of Kate O’Brien’s Mary Lavelle". in Irish University Review, Vol. 39, No. 1 (Spring/Summer 2009): 65–75.
- Emma Donoghue. "Embraces of Love". in Faithful Companions: Collected Essays Celebrating the 25th Anniversary of The Kate O'Brien Weekend. Mary Coll ed. Limerick: Mellick Press, 2009, pp. 16–31.
- Aintzane L. Mentxaka: "Film into Novel: Kate O’Brien’s Modernist use of Film Techniques". in Viewpoints: Theoretical Perspectives on Irish Visual Texts. Clare Bracken and Emma Radley eds. Cork: Cork University Press, 2013, pp. 124–36.
- Michael G. Cronin: 'Kate O'Brien and the Erotics of Liberal Catholic Dissent'. Field Day Review, 6.(2010)
- Michael G. Cronin: ‘'Fantastic Longings': The Moral Cartography of Kate O’Brien's Mary Lavelle’. In: Werner Huber, Sandra Mayer and Julia Novak (eds). Irish Studies in Europe, 4. Trier: WVT Wissenschaftlicher Verlag. (2012)

== Film adaptations ==
- That Lady (1955) starring Olivia de Havilland, Gilbert Roland, and Paul Scofield
- Last of Summer (TV, 1977)
- Talk of Angels (1998) starring Polly Walker, Vincent Perez, Franco Nero, Frances McDormand, Ruth McCabe and Penélope Cruz

== See also ==
- Limerick
- Irish literature
- Censorship in the Republic of Ireland
- Feminism in the United Kingdom
- List of people on the postage stamps of Ireland
