= Irish Workers' Party (1926) =

Irish Communist Party

Worker's Party of Ireland
- Leader: Roddy Connolly
- Founded: 1926
- Dissolved: 1927
- Ideology: Communism; Marxism
- Political position: Far-left

The Worker's Party of Ireland (WPI) was a short-lived communist party in Ireland. It was founded in 1926 by former members of the Communist Party of Ireland (CPI) and other communists. Among its members were Roddy Connolly (son of James Connolly), who served as party leader, Nora Connolly (daughter of James Connolly), Tom Lyng, the trade unionist P. T. Daly, Walter Carpenter Jnr, and Jack White. Many of the members had been active in Jim Larkin's Irish Worker League, and the party attempted to affiliate with the Communist International in place of the IWL.

== Founding ==
Due to mounting frustrations at the political inaction of Sinn Féin, left leaning groups guided by former members of the CPI formed a special congress on 3, 4 and 7 April to form a political party. This congress chose Roddy Connolly to be the executive of this party under the title of "education organizer" and later "political secretary," he was also the only officially paid member of this new party. The WPI debuted to the public on 9 May 1926, at a commemoration event for James Connolly. Roddy Connolly announced the WPI as a party to resolve the questions of national and social identity which his father before him had set-out to solve.

== Politics ==
Roddy Connolly envisioned the party to be a player in the formation of an independent Irish workers' state from the Irish Free State. The WPI also stood against both Eamon De Valera's party Fianna Fáil, which was an agent of "petty-bourgeois nationalism" from his point of view, and W.T. Cosgrave's Cumann na nGaedheal. Although later in 1926, in line with perceptions of Soviet policies, the WPI would take a much softer stance on Fianna Fáil instead being allies in the fight against British colonialism to form an independent Ireland. The WPI pulled in support from working class individuals who were disillusioned with the pro-Anglo-Irish treaty views of Cumann na nGaedheal and the bourgeois views of Fianna Fáil.

The party published Hammer and Plough in, edited by Roddy Connolly, and focused on work in the Irish National Unemployed Movement. Hammer and Plough would not prove to be a sustainable publication and suspend later October 1926 due to financial problems. The WPI would later try to launch the Workers' Republic as a replacement newspaper, but it would also cease publication in 1926 after only a few issues.

== Dissolution ==
Due to mounting pressures from the Communist International to disband and accept the Irish Worker League (IWL) as the primary party of Ireland, the WPI lost all of its momentum. Although by a majority vote the WPI refused to accept Moscow's proposition, Rody Connolly resigned as executive since he did not wish to go against the wishes of the guiding movement in Moscow. Remaining members would continue to have squabbles with Jim Larkin and the IWL until dissolving the party at the end of 1927. Many of the members (like Connolly) ended up joining the Irish Labour Party, others migrated back to the IWL and many others featured in other left wing, socialist and communist movements and parties, such as the Republican Congress.
