= Dorothy Macardle =

Irish writer and historian (1889–1958)

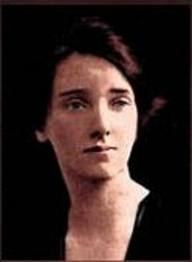
- Portrait of Macardle
- Born: 2 February 1889; Dundalk, Ireland
- Died: 23 December 1958 (aged 69); Drogheda, Ireland
- Education: Alexandra College, Dublin
- Alma mater: University College Dublin
- Occupations: Novelist; Playwright; Historian
- Political party: Fianna Fáil (1926–1927); Women's Social and Progressive League (1937–c.1945)

Dorothy Macardle (7 March 1889 – 23 December 1958) was an Irish writer, novelist, playwright, journalist and non-academic historian. Associated throughout her life with Irish republicanism, she was a founding member of Fianna Fáil in 1926 and was considered to be closely aligned with Éamon de Valera until her death, although she was vocal critic of how women were represented in the 1937 constitution created by Fianna Fáil. She was also unable to respect de Valera's attitudes adopted during World War II. Her book, The Irish Republic, is one of the more frequently cited narrative accounts of the Irish War of Independence and its aftermath, particularly for its exposition of the anti-treaty viewpoint.

== Early life ==
Dorothea Margaret Callan Macardle was born in Dundalk, County Louth on 7 March 1889 into a wealthy brewing family famous for producing Macardle's Ale. Macardle's father, Sir Thomas Callan Macardle, was a Catholic who supported John Redmond and the Irish Home Rule movement, while her mother, Lucy "Minnie" Macardle, came from an English Anglican background and was politically a unionist; Lucy had converted to Catholicism upon her marriage to Thomas. Macardle and her siblings were raised as Catholics, but Lucy, who was politically isolated in Ireland, "inculcated in her children an idealised view of England and an enthusiasm for the British empire". Macardle received her secondary education in Alexandra College, Dublin—a school under the management of the Church of Ireland—and later attended University College Dublin. Upon graduating, she returned to teach English at Alexandra where she had first encountered Irish nationalism as a student. This was further developed by Macardle's first experiences of Dublin's slums, which "convinced her that an autonomous Ireland might be better able to look after its own affairs" than the Dublin Castle administration could.

Between 1914 and 1916, Macardle lived and worked in Stratford-upon-Avon in Warwickshire, England. There, her encounters with upper-class English people who expressed anti-Irish sentiment and supported keeping Ireland in the British Empire by force further weakened her Anglophilia. Upon the outbreak of World War I, Macardle supported the Allies, as did the rest of her family. Her father led the County Louth recruiting committee while two of her brothers volunteered for the British Army. Her brother, Lieutenant Kenneth Callan Macardle, was killed at the Battle of the Somme, while another brother, Major John Ross Macardle, survived the war and earned the Military Cross. While Macardle was a student, the Easter Rising occurred, an experience credited for a further divergence of her views regarding republicanism and her family.

== Irish revolutionary period ==
=== Irish War of Independence ===
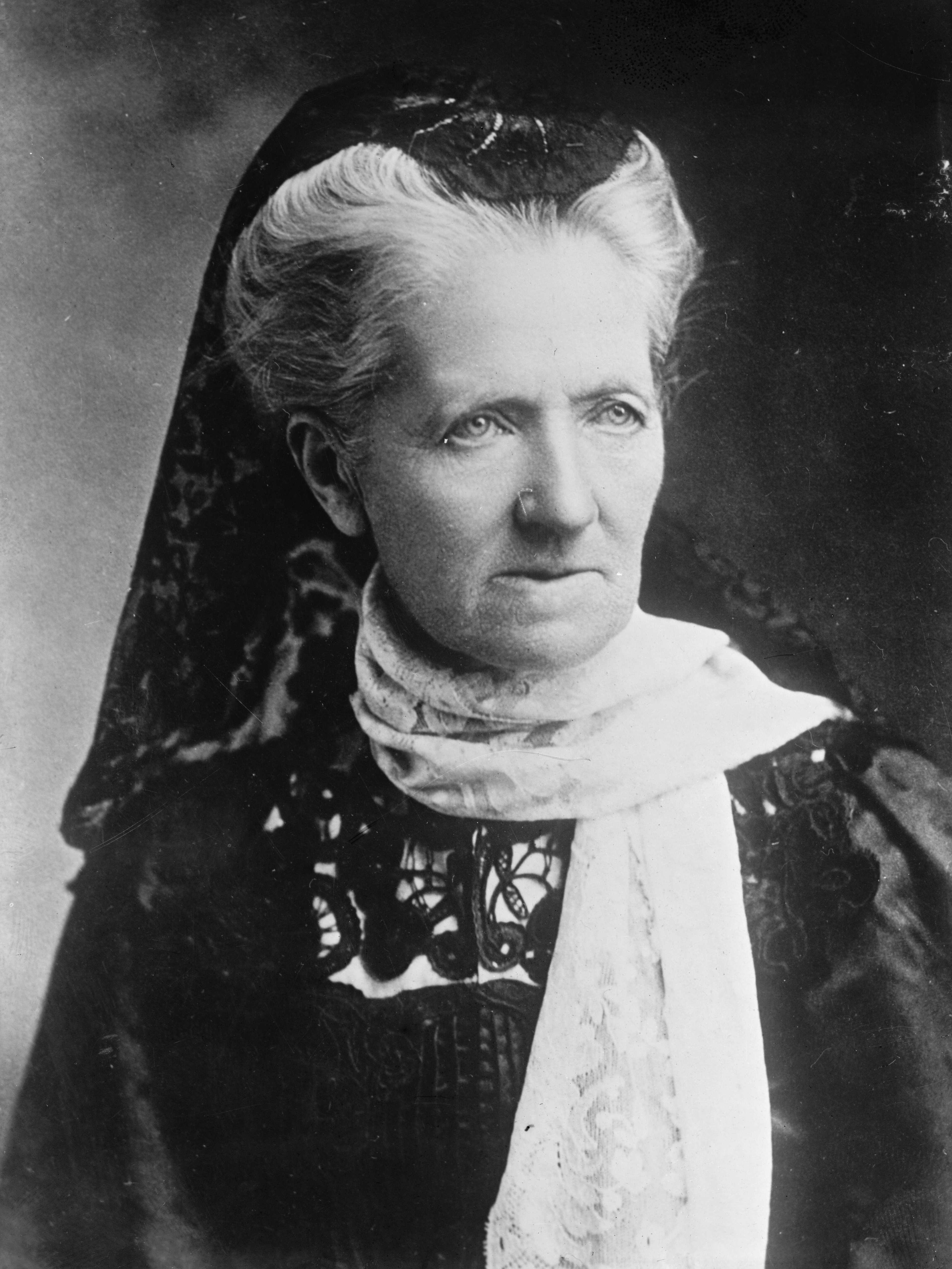
During the Irish revolutionary period, Macardle worked alongside Charlotte Despard and Maud Gonne MacBride

Macardle was a member of the Gaelic League and later joined both Sinn Féin and Cumann na mBan in 1917. In 1918 Macardle was arrested by the RIC while teaching at Alexandra.

On 19 January 1919, Macardle was in the public gallery for the inaugural meeting of the First Dáil and witnessed it declare unilateral independence from the United Kingdom, which would ultimately be the catalyst for the Irish War of Independence.

By 1919 Macardle had befriended Maud Gonne MacBride, the widow of the 1916 Easter Rising participant John MacBride, and together the two worked at the Irish White Cross, attending to those injured in the war. It was during this period Macardle also became a propagandist for the nationalist side.

In December 1920, Macardle travelled to London to meet with Margot Asquith, the wife of the former British prime minister HH Asquith, hoping to establish a line of communication between the Irish and British governments. It was during this trip that Macardle came into contact with Charlotte Despard, sister of the Viceroy of Ireland Lord French. Despard had taken the pro-Irish side in the war and returned with Macardle to Dublin.

=== Irish Civil War ===
Following the signing of the Anglo-Irish treaty in December 1921, Macardle took the anti-treaty side in the ensuing Irish Civil War. Alongside Gonne MacBride and Despard, she helped found the Women Prisoners' Defence League, which campaigned and advocated for republicans imprisoned by the newly established Irish Free State government. It was also during this same time that she began working alongside Erskine Childers in writing for anti-treaty publications An Phoblacht and Irish Freedom.

In October 1922 Despard, Gonne MacBride and Macardle were speaking at a protest on O'Connell Street, Dublin against the arrest of Mary MacSwiney (a sitting Teachta Dála) by the Free State when Free State authorities moved to break it up. Rioting followed and Free State forces opened fire, resulting in 14 people being seriously wounded while hundreds of others were harmed in the subsequent stampede to flee. Following the event, Macardle announced she was going to pursue support of the Anti-treaty side full-time in a letter to Alexandra College, which ultimately lead to her dismissal on 15 November 1922. In the following days Macardle was captured and imprisoned by the Free State government and subsequently served time in both Mountjoy and Kilmainham Gaols, with Rosamund Jacob as her cellmate. During one point at her time in Kilmainham, Macardle was beaten unconscious by male wardens. She became close friends with Jacob and shared a flat with her at Herbert Place, Ballsbridge later in the 1920s.

The Irish Civil War concluded in the spring of 1923, and Macardle was released from prison on 9 May.

== Post-revolutionary period ==
=== Investigating the Ballyseedy massacre ===
Following the Irish Civil War, Macardle remained active in Sinn Féin and was drawn into the camp of its leader Éamon de Valera and his wife Sinéad. Macardle travelled alongside the de Valeras as they toured the country and she was a frequent visitor to their home. As the trust between Macardle and de Valera developed, de Valera asked Macardle to travel to County Kerry to investigate and document what later became known as the Ballyseedy massacre of March 1923, in which a number of unarmed republican prisoners were reported to have been killed in reprisals. Macardle obliged, and by May 1924 she had compiled a report that was released under the title of "the tragedies of Kerry". Immediately upon the release of the report, the Minister of Defence Richard Mulcahy set up an inquiry in June 1924 to carry out a separate investigation by the government. However, the government's inquiry came to the conclusion there had been no wrongdoing committed. Her book "Tragedies of Kerry" remains in print and was the first journalistic historical account of the Civil War from those on the Republican Side detailing Ballyseedy, Countess Bridge and various other incidents that occurred in Kerry during this time.

=== Founding member of Fianna Fáil ===
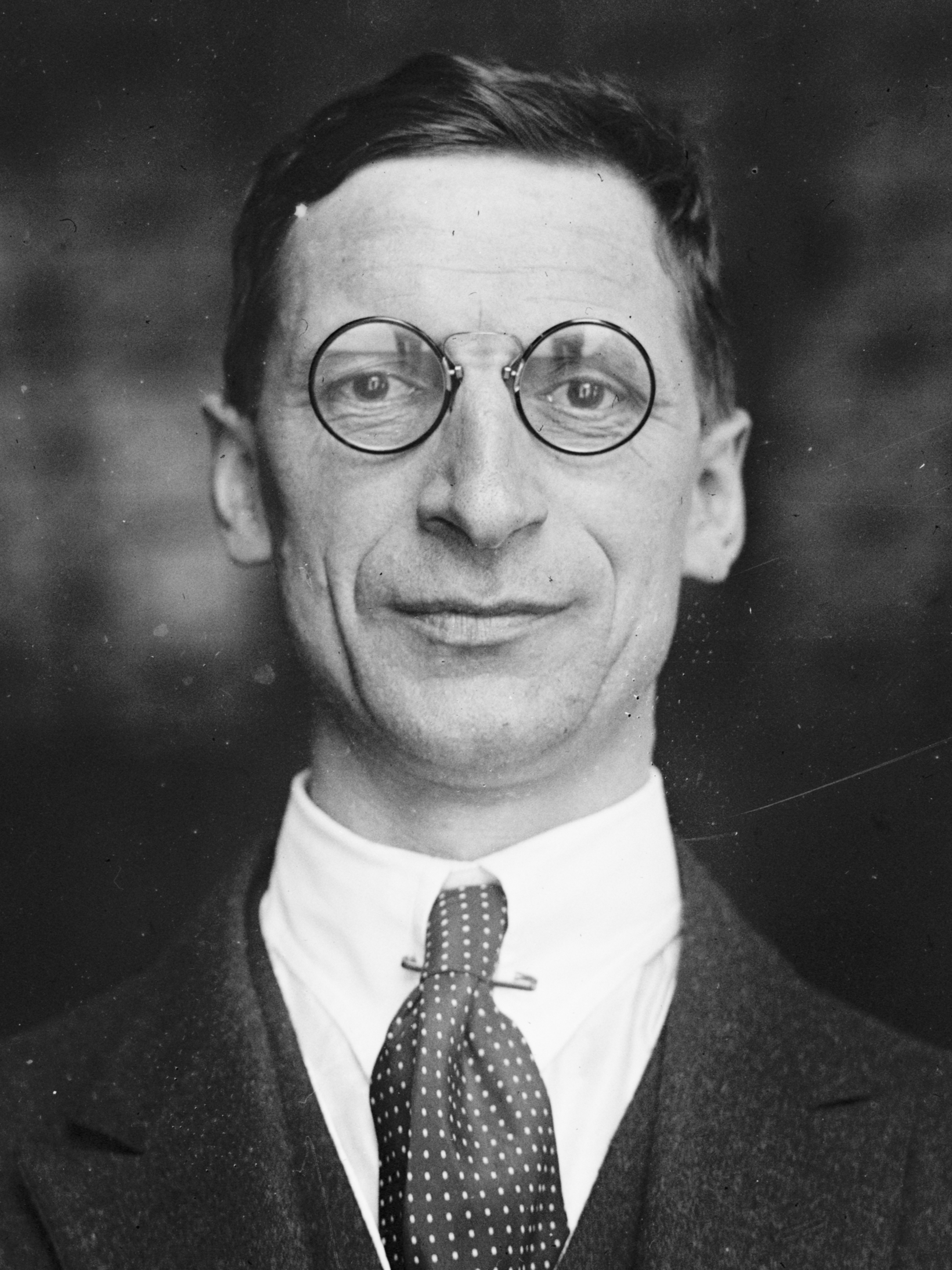
Macardle was considered to be closely aligned to Éamon de Valera for most of her life

In 1926, Éamon de Valera resigned as President of Sinn Féin and walked out of the party following a vote against his motion that members of the party should end their policy of abstentionism against Dáil Éireann. De Valera and his supporters, including Macardle, formed the new political party Fianna Fáil in May 1926, with Macardle immediately elected to the party's National Executive, one of six female members out of twelve on the original party National Executive the others being Hanna Sheehy-Skeffington, Kathleen Clarke, Constance Markievicz and Linda Kearns. Macardle was made the party's director of publicity. However, she resigned from Fianna Fáil in 1927 when the new party endorsed taking their seats in Dáil Eireann. Nevertheless, her views remained relatively pro-Fianna Fáil and pro-de Valera.

=== Writer and broadcaster ===
Macardle recounted her civil war experiences in Earthbound: Nine Stories of Ireland (1924). She continued as a playwright for the next two decades. In her dramatic writing, she used the pseudonym Margaret Callan. In many of her plays a domineering female character was always present. This has been thought to be symbolic of her own relationship with her own mother. Her parents marriage had broken up as her mother returned to England and her father raised the children with servants in Cambrickville and they were sent away for school. This female character holds back the growth and development of the younger female character in Dorothy's plays and writings.

By 1931, Macardle had taken up work as a writer for the Irish Press, which was owned by de Valera and leaned heavily toward supporting Fianna Fáil and Irish republicanism in general. In addition to being a theatre and literary critic for the paper, Macardle also occasionally wrote pieces of investigative journalism such as reports on Dublin's slums. In the mid-1930s Macarcdle also became a broadcaster for the newly created national radio station Radio Éireann.

=== The Irish Republic (1937) ===
In 1937, Macardle wrote and published the work by which she is best known for; "The Irish Republic", an in-depth account of the history of Ireland between 1919 until 1923. Because of the book, political opponents and some modern historians consider Macardle to have been a hagiographer towards de Valera's political views. In 1939 she admitted: "I am a propagandist, unrepentant and unashamed". Overall, however, the book was well-received, with reviews ranging from "glowing" to measured praise. Macardle was widely praised for her research, thorough documentation, range of sources and narration of dramatic events, alongside reservations about the book's political slant. The book was reprinted several times, most recently in 2005. Éamon de Valera considered The Irish Republic the only authoritative account of the period from 1916 to 1926, and the book was widely used by de Valera and Fianna Fáil over the years and indeed by history and political students. Macardle spent seven years writing the book in a cottage in Delgany in Wicklow and it is a day-by-day account of the history of the events in Ireland from 1919 to 1923 recorded in painstaking detail together with voluminous source material.

=== Critic and Anti-fascist ===
Macardle supported the Spanish Republican cause during the Spanish Civil War and was involved with the Spanish Aid Committee in Ireland, which held meetings at the Court Laundry on Harcourt Street in Dublin. The committee was chaired by Hanna Sheehy-Skeffington and included other prominent supporters of the Spanish Republic, including Nora Connolly-O'Brien.

In 1937, De Valera's Fianna Fáil government was able to create a new Constitution of Ireland following a successful referendum. However, there was widespread criticism of this new constitution from women, particularly republican women, as the language of the new constitution emphasised that a woman's place should be in the home. Macardle was amongst them, deploring what she saw as the reduced status of women in this new Constitution . Furthermore, she noted that the new Constitution dropped the commitment of the 1916 Proclamation to guarantee equal rights and opportunities "without distinction of sex" and wrote to de Valera questioning how anyone "with advanced views on the rights of women" could support it. De Valera also found her criticising compulsory Irish language teaching in schools.

The entire matter of the new constitution led Macardle to join Hanna Sheehy-Skeffington's Women's Social and Progressive League.

While working as a journalist with the League of Nations in the late 1930s, Macardle acquired a considerable affinity with the plight of Czechoslovakia being pressed to make territorial concessions to Nazi Germany. Believing that "Hitler's war should be everybody's war", she disagreed with de Valera's policy of neutrality. She went to work for the BBC in London, developed her fiction and, in the war's aftermath, campaigned for refugee children – a crisis described in her book Children of Europe (1949). In 1951 she became the first president of the Irish Society of Civil Liberties.

== Death ==
She died in 1958 in a hospital in Drogheda, of cancer, at the age of 69. Though she was somewhat disillusioned with the new Irish State, she left the royalties from The Irish Republic to her close friend Éamon de Valera, who had written the foreword to the book. De Valera visited her when she was dying. She was accorded a state funeral, with De Valera giving the oration, and is buried in Sutton.

== Published works ==
- Tragedies of Kerry, 1922–23
- Earthbound: Nine Stories of Ireland, 1924
- The Irish Republic (published 1937, 1938, 1951, 1968 and subsequently)
- Uneasy Freehold (1941, basis for the 1944 movie The Uninvited), published in the US as The Uninvited (1942)
- The Unforeseen (1946) (novel set in Ireland) American title of Fantastic Summer (1946)
- Without Fanfares: Some Reflections on the Republic of Ireland (1947)
- Children of Europe: a study of the children of liberated countries; their war-time experiences, their reactions, and their needs, with a note on Germany (1949)
- The Dark Enchantment (1953) (a novel set in Provence)
- Shakespeare, Man and Boy (published posthumously in 1961)
