= Roddy Connolly =

Irish politician (1901–1980)

- Connolly on RTÉ Television in 1966

Teachta Dála
- In office February 1948 – May 1951
- In office June 1943 – May 1944
- Constituency: Louth

Senator
- In office 23 April 1975 – 27 October 1977
- Constituency: Cultural and Educational Panel

Personal details
- Born: 11 February 1901 Dublin, Ireland
- Died: 16 December 1980 (aged 79) Bray, County Wicklow, Ireland
- Party: Labour Party
- Other political affiliations: Socialist Party of Ireland; Communist International; Irish Workers' Party; Republican Congress
- Spouses: Jessica Maidment (m. 1921–1928); Peggy Connolly (m. 1938)
- Parents: James Connolly (father); Lillie Reynolds (mother)
- Relatives: Nora Connolly O'Brien (sister)

Roderick James Connolly (11 February 1901 – 16 December 1980) was a socialist politician in Ireland. He was also known as "Roddy Connolly" and "Rory Connolly".

== Biography ==
The son of Irish socialist James Connolly and Lillie Connolly. A lieutenant in the Irish Citizen Army (ICA) boys' corps, he was involved in the 1916 Easter Rising. At the age of 15, he served in the GPO under his father. He joined the Socialist Party of Ireland in 1917.

Connolly travelled to Russia on several occasions in 1920 and 1921 and formed a close association with Vladimir Lenin and was hugely influenced by the Soviet leader. He was a delegate to the Second Congress of the Communist International (Comintern) as a delegate of the Industrial Workers of the World in June 1920. It was here he met Lenin at just 19 years old after an introduction from John Reed. According to Connolly, Lenin spoke English with a Rathmines accent which he acquired from his Irish tutor.

Alongside James Fearon, he helped form and became President of the first Communist Party of Ireland (CPI) in October 1921. He was editor of CPI newspaper, The Workers' Republic. He opposed the 1921 Anglo-Irish Treaty between the representatives of the Irish Republic and the British state, and fought in the Irish Civil War on the anti-treaty side. The CPI was the first Irish political party to oppose the Treaty and urged the IRA to adopt socialist policies to defeat the new Irish Free State government. The CPI was dissolved in 1924 by the Comintern but in 1926, Connolly helped set up a second Marxist party, the Irish Workers' Party. Connolly was the party leader and editor of its journal, The Hammer and Plough. This party too was dissolved in 1927.

Connolly joined the Irish Labour Party in 1928 and in 1934 participated in the last socialist initiative of Inter-War Ireland, the Irish Republican Congress. He was imprisoned twice in 1935. At the 1943 general election, Connolly was elected to the Dáil as a Labour Party Teachta Dála (TD) for Louth. He lost his seat at the 1944 general election, but was re-elected at the 1948 general election, before losing once more at the 1951 general election. Connolly was also financial secretary of the party from 1941 to 1949.

Connolly entered a semi-retirement between the mid-1950s and mid-1960s, but in the late 1960s, he began a comeback. He was elected as party chairman in 1971 and held this position until 1978. During his time as chairman Connolly oversaw the expulsion of the Socialist Labour Alliance in 1971, some of whose members would go on to form the Socialist Workers Network, which in turn eventually established People Before Profit.

Connolly also sat in Seanad Éireann from 1975 to 1977 on the Cultural and Educational Panel. He was a supporter of the Labour Party–Fine Gael coalition government that was in power from 1973 to 1977, and defended the coalition from left-wing critics by reminding them his father James Connolly had allied with the likes of Patrick Pearse in 1916.

Connolly died in St Michael's hospital, Dún Laoghaire, in December 1980.

Party political offices
New office	President of the Communist Party of Ireland; October 1921 – January 1923	Post was abolished, but he also failed to get re-elected to the Party's Central Executive Committee
New office	Leader of the Irish Workers' Party; 1926–1927	Office abolished
Preceded by ?	Chairman of the Labour Party; 1971–1978	Succeeded by Michael D. Higgins

Dáil	Election	Deputy (Party)	Deputy (Party)	Deputy (Party)	Deputy (Party)	Deputy (Party)
4th	1923	Frank Aiken (Rep)	Peter Hughes (CnaG)	James Murphy (CnaG)	3 seats until 1977	
5th	1927 (Jun)	Frank Aiken (FF)	James Coburn (NL)	James Murphy (CnaG)	3 seats until 1977	
6th	1927 (Sep)	Frank Aiken (FF)	James Coburn (NL)	James Murphy (CnaG)	3 seats until 1977	
7th	1932	Frank Aiken (FF)	James Coburn (Ind.)	James Murphy (CnaG)	3 seats until 1977	
8th	1933	Frank Aiken (FF)	James Coburn (Ind.)	James Murphy (CnaG)	3 seats until 1977	
9th	1937	Frank Aiken (FF)	James Coburn (FG)	Laurence Walsh (FF)	3 seats until 1977	
10th	1938	Frank Aiken (FF)	James Coburn (FG)	Laurence Walsh (FF)	3 seats until 1977	
11th	1943	Frank Aiken (FF)	James Coburn (FG)	Roddy Connolly (Lab)	3 seats until 1977	
12th	1944	Frank Aiken (FF)	James Coburn (FG)	Laurence Walsh (FF)	3 seats until 1977	
13th	1948	Frank Aiken (FF)	James Coburn (FG)	Roddy Connolly (Lab)	3 seats until 1977	
14th	1951	Frank Aiken (FF)	James Coburn (FG)	Laurence Walsh (FF)	3 seats until 1977	
14th	1954 by-election	Frank Aiken (FF)	George Coburn (FG)	Laurence Walsh (FF)	3 seats until 1977	
15th	1954	Frank Aiken (FF)	George Coburn (FG)	Paddy Donegan (FG)	3 seats until 1977	
16th	1957	Frank Aiken (FF)	George Coburn (FG)	Pádraig Faulkner (Note: Faulker served as Ceann Comhairle in the 21st Dáil from 1977 to 1981, and was returned automatically at the 1981 election.) (FF)	3 seats until 1977	
17th	1961	Frank Aiken (FF)	Paddy Donegan (FG)	Pádraig Faulkner (FF)	3 seats until 1977	
18th	1965	Frank Aiken (FF)	Paddy Donegan (FG)	Pádraig Faulkner (FF)	3 seats until 1977	
19th	1969	Frank Aiken (FF)	Paddy Donegan (FG)	Pádraig Faulkner (FF)	3 seats until 1977	
20th	1973	Joseph Farrell (FF)	Paddy Donegan (FG)	Pádraig Faulkner (FF)	3 seats until 1977	
21st	1977	Joseph Farrell (FF)	Paddy Donegan (FG)	Pádraig Faulkner (FF)	Eddie Filgate (FF)	4 seats 1977–2011
22nd	1981	Paddy Agnew (AHB)	Bernard Markey (FG)	Pádraig Faulkner (FF)	Eddie Filgate (FF)	4 seats 1977–2011
23rd	1982 (Feb)	Thomas Bellew (FF)	Bernard Markey (FG)	Pádraig Faulkner (FF)	Eddie Filgate (FF)	4 seats 1977–2011
24th	1982 (Nov)	Michael Bell (Lab)	Brendan McGahon (FG)	Pádraig Faulkner (FF)	Séamus Kirk (Note: Kirk served as Ceann Comhairle in the 30th Dáil from 2009 to 2011, and was returned automatically at the 2011 election.) (FF)	4 seats 1977–2011
25th	1987	Michael Bell (Lab)	Brendan McGahon (FG)	Dermot Ahern (FF)	Séamus Kirk (FF)	4 seats 1977–2011
26th	1989	Michael Bell (Lab)	Brendan McGahon (FG)	Dermot Ahern (FF)	Séamus Kirk (FF)	4 seats 1977–2011
27th	1992	Michael Bell (Lab)	Brendan McGahon (FG)	Dermot Ahern (FF)	Séamus Kirk (FF)	4 seats 1977–2011
28th	1997	Michael Bell (Lab)	Brendan McGahon (FG)	Dermot Ahern (FF)	Séamus Kirk (FF)	4 seats 1977–2011
29th	2002	Arthur Morgan (SF)	Fergus O'Dowd (FG)	Dermot Ahern (FF)	Séamus Kirk (FF)	4 seats 1977–2011
30th	2007	Arthur Morgan (SF)	Fergus O'Dowd (FG)	Dermot Ahern (FF)	Séamus Kirk (FF)	4 seats 1977–2011
31st	2011	Gerry Adams (SF)	Fergus O'Dowd (FG)	Ged Nash (Lab)	Séamus Kirk (FF)	Peter Fitzpatrick (FG)
32nd	2016	Gerry Adams (SF)	Fergus O'Dowd (FG)	Declan Breathnach (FF)	Imelda Munster (SF)	Peter Fitzpatrick (FG)
33rd	2020	Ruairí Ó Murchú (SF)	Fergus O'Dowd (FG)	Ged Nash (Lab)	Imelda Munster (SF)	Peter Fitzpatrick (Ind.)
34th	2024	Ruairí Ó Murchú (SF)	Paula Butterly (FG)	Ged Nash (Lab)	Joanna Byrne (SF)	Erin McGreehan (FF)
