= The Irish Republic (book) =

- Author: Dorothy Macardle
- Subject: Irish War of Independence
- Genre: History
- ISBN: 0863277128

The Irish Republic is a history book written by Dorothy Macardle, first published in 1937, which covers the formation and existence of the Irish Republic, the Irish War of Independence, the Anglo-Irish Treaty and the Irish Civil War, a period which covered from 1919–1923. It was commissioned by politician Éamon de Valera, and is not politically neutral, with Macardle reportedly describing herself as a "propagandist, unrepentant and unashamed".

The book, which was first published in 1937, analysed the period from an Irish republican, pro-Éamon de Valera perspective. Sometimes disputed for aspects of its analysis, the book is described in a biography of Macardle as being "prized more for the insights it provides into the ideological disputes of its time than as a historical work in its own right". Writing in 2016, Peter Berresford Ellis described it as "still the standard history of the period 1916–23 in Ireland".

The book, along with Frank Pakenham's Peace by Ordeal, features on a number of reading lists for university courses which cover the period. Among the reasons for this are:

- The author personally knew many of the people she was writing about; among those thanked in the acknowledgements were Seán T. O'Kelly, Oscar Traynor, Thomas Derrig, Seán MacBride, and the widows of Austin Stack and Erskine Childers. As a result, she knew from personal experience their private views and opinions, not just those expressed publicly.
- She had been an activist with the republican movement during the period, serving in Cumann na mBan and being jailed during the Civil War. Thus she had an insider's perspective on the movement.
- It reflects the perspective of Anti-Treaty republicans. Later books were less sympathetic to the Anti-Treaty side, given the widespread belief, even expressed by de Valera at the end of his life, that opposition to the Treaty was in retrospect a mistake.

Macardle reportedly willed the royalties from the book, which has regularly been reprinted, to Éamon de Valera, who wrote the book's foreword. The book's political allegiances were demonstrated unmistakably when a studio portrait of de Valera featured on the front page of some editions.

Some historians, such as Patrick Murray, have found that the book's outline was substantially laid down by de Valera to create a continuous justification of his political views from 1916 to 1936, that was then fleshed out by Macardle. De Valera said it was "the only really authoritative account of the period 1916–26".
