= Nora Connolly O'Brien =

Irish politician, activist and writer (1893–1981)

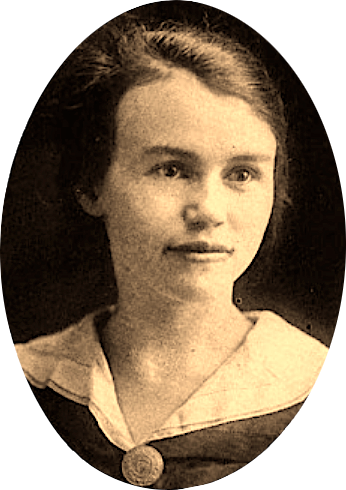

Senator
- In office 22 May 1957 – 5 November 1969
- Constituency: Nominated by the Taoiseach

Personal details
- Born: Nora Connolly; 14 November 1892 Edinburgh, Scotland
- Died: 17 June 1981 (aged 88) Dublin, Ireland
- Party: Independent
- Spouse: Seamus O'Brien (m. 1922–1962)
- Parents: James Connolly (father); Lillie Reynolds (mother)
- Relatives: Roddy Connolly (brother)

Nora Connolly O'Brien (14 November 1892 – 17 June 1981) was an Irish politician, activist and writer. She was a member of Seanad Éireann from 1957 to 1969.

== Early life ==
Nora Connolly was the daughter of Irish republican and socialist leader James Connolly and his wife Lillie Connolly (née Reynolds). She was born in Edinburgh, one of seven children. She moved with her family to Dublin when she was three years old. Her formal education in Dublin extended to weekly Gaelic League classes to learn the Irish language. Otherwise, her mother, a former nursery maid, taught her how to read by the age of three and how to write, and arithmetic. The family moved to Troy, New York, when she was nine years old for her father to work at an insurance company. That work fell through, at which time he became increasingly political, prompting the family's eventual return to Ireland, this time to Belfast in 1910, with Nora going ahead a year earlier.

After her father's execution, the surviving Connollys tried to depart for America but were denied passports by the British government. Undeterred, they travelled to Boston via Edinburgh with Nora using the pseudonym Margaret (her middle name). In Boston, she met Seamus O'Brien, a courier for Michael Collins, whom she later married in 1922. When she wanted to return to Ireland, she was denied entry but stowed away on a boat from Liverpool dressed as a boy.

== Political career ==
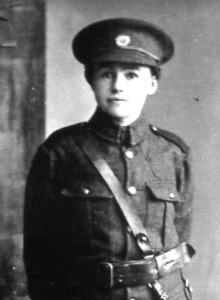
Connolly O'Brien in her Cumann na mBan uniform

=== Influence ===
Connolly O'Brien was heavily influenced in her political beliefs by her father James Connolly, who was a committed republican and socialist. From a young age she attended her father's political meetings, accompanying him on a four-month Scottish lecture tour at age 8.

After moving to Belfast in 1911, she began to get more involved in the labour and republican movements while her father James remained in Dublin and became an organizer of the Irish Transport and General Workers' Union (ITGWU) in Dublin. She was a founding member of the Young Republican Party, advocating against Partition of Northern Ireland as the Home Rule Crisis increased. She also helped to found the Belfast branch of Cumann na mBan, the women's section of the Irish Volunteers

=== Prior to the 1916 Rising ===
At eight years old, she saw her father speak at many socialist clubs in Glasgow, and thereafter became a devotee of socialist politics. She moved to Belfast in 1910 for work, and her family followed soon after. She participated in her first strike whilst working in Belfast over the conditions in which factory workers were being forced to work under. While she was in Belfast she became a founding member of the Young Republican Army and of the girl's branch of the Fianna. She was also a founding member of Cumann na mBan in Belfast. In 1914, plans were being put in place for a rebellion in Ireland. She and her sister helped courier ammunition and arms to hiding places for Erskine Childers and were then rewarded with two rifles. She was then sent to America with a message from her father about the rising planned for 1916.

When Connolly O'Brien returned to Dublin she met members of the Military Council who were planning the rising. In the days before the rising, she was sent back to Belfast to try and convince the leading activist there to join the fight. Under the command of a 23-year-old Connolly O'Brien, she and nine other members of Cumann na mBan returned to Dublin to take part in the fight and were the only organised group to leave Ulster to take part in the rising.

=== 1916 Easter Rising ===
In her statement to the Bureau of Military History, she described "the rare privilege" of cooking breakfast for the leaders of the rising at Liberty Hall on the morning of the rising. She was sent back to County Tyrone for their safety and to re-muster the Northern Division of the Irish Volunteers, under orders from Patrick Pearse. After the attempt failed, she returned to Dublin with her sister, but due to train disruptions walked from Dundalk, and spending a night in a field near Balbriggan only to arrive hours after the leaders of the Easter Rising surrendered. She vividly remembers visiting her father James Connolly, in Dublin Castle the night before his execution, where she smuggled out statements to the court martial; Before they said goodbye, as he feared for his family, he advised them that there would be resentment against them and advised them to go to the United States.

=== Political activity 1916–1918 ===
While in Boston she spoke for hours at Faneuil Hall in order to gain American support and recognition of the Irish Republic. She furthered her efforts by writing a book titled The Unbroken Tradition, in which she describes the events of the Easter Rising, which was subsequently banned as President Woodrow Wilson entered the United States in World War I and it was labelled "anti-British".

In 1917 she returned anonymously to Ireland, and remained quiet for some time. She disagreed with the Labour Party's policy on neutrality, and canvassed for Sinn Féin in the 1918 general election.

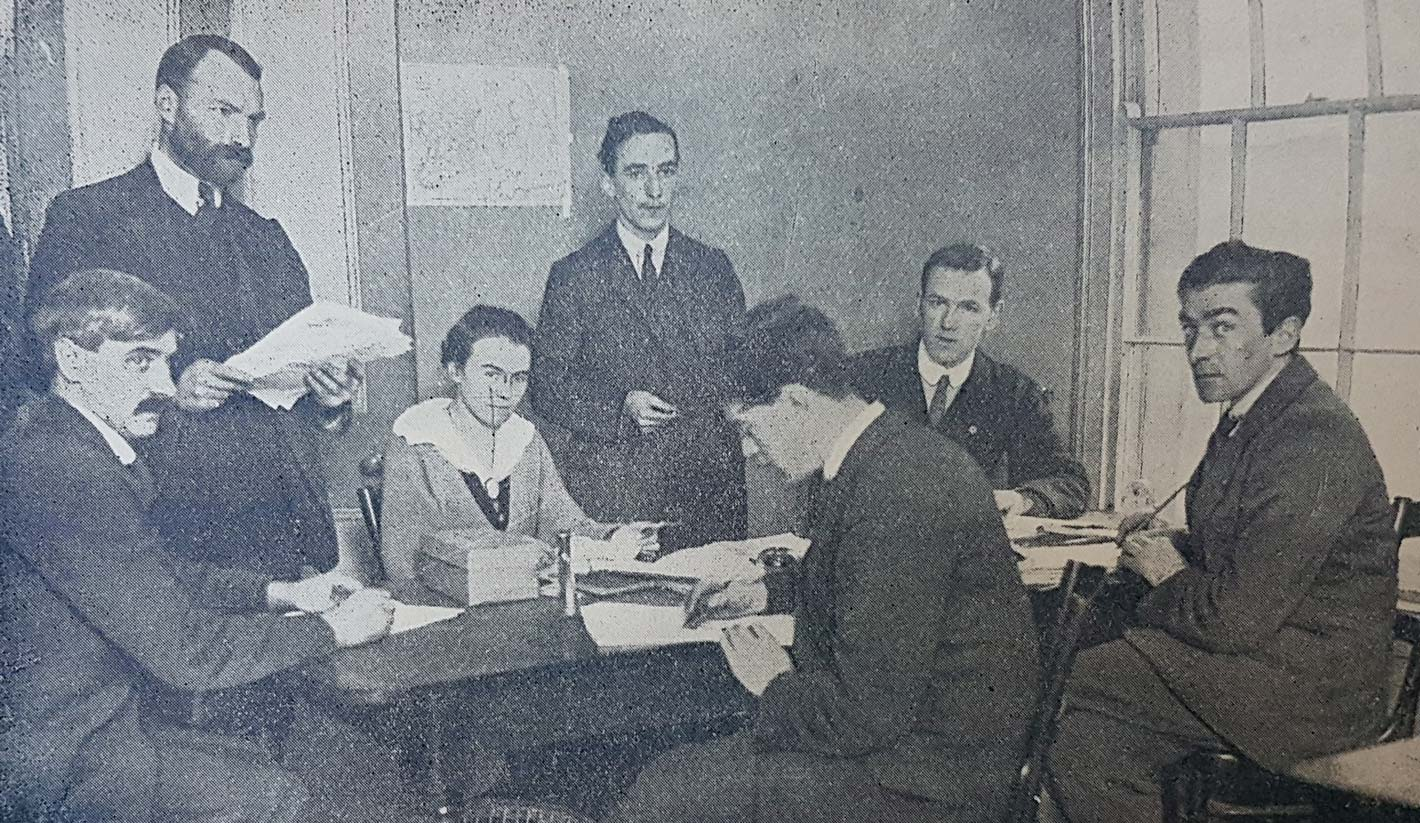
Connolly O'Brien working alongside members of the Labour movement in Liberty Hall, 1919. Standing L-R: William O'Brien and Cathal O'Shannon. Sitting L-R: Thomas Foran, Nora Connolly O'Brien, David O'Leary, Seamus Hughes and Patrick O'Kelly

=== War of Independence and Civil War 1919–1923 ===
Following her return to Ireland in 1917, she remained active in Cumann na mBan and fought during the War of Independence from 1919 to 1921. Following the signing of the Anglo-Irish Treaty, Cumann na mBan had sided on the anti-treaty side. Following the outbreak of the Irish Civil War, she supervised an Anti-Treaty first aid post at Tara Hall. Cumann na mBan was outlawed by the Free State government and in November 1922 she was arrested and imprisoned in Kilmainham Gaol, with many other members. She was released in 1923 on the writ of habeas corpus on the grounds her arrest had been unlawful.

=== Later political career ===
In the years after the Irish Revolutionary period, Connolly O'Brien, who had gone back and forth ideologically between prioritising Irish Nationalism and Socialism, came to believe as her father did that the two causes could be wed as one. She thus began set about trying to gain influence over the Irish Republican Army. However, this stance brought her into conflict with her brother Roddy, who publicly accused her of "regressing from Marxism towards Republicanism". Despite this, in 1926, she, along with her brother, founded the short-lived Irish Workers' Party from 1926 to 1927.

Following the meeting of the Republican Congress on 29–30 September 1934 in Rathmines Town Hall, the socialist movement in Ireland was divided on whether the Congress should resolve itself into a new revolutionary Socialist Party, or remain as a united front of all progressive forces against fascism. She supported forming a new political party, but when a resolution was passed to remain as a united front, she and her group withdrew from the congress. Following the collapse of the Republican Congress, Connolly O'Brien joined the Labour Party.

In the summer of 1936, Connolly O'Brien wrote to Leon Trotsky, offering to report to him on the actions of the "National Revolutionaries" of the IRA, as well any developments in the Labour Party, whom Connolly O'Brien still believed could take "the leading role in the revolutionary movement in Ireland". During the Spanish Civil War she served on the Spanish Aid Committee. She met and was photographed with the Indian independence leader Subhas Chandra Bose when he visited Ireland in 1936.

Connolly O'Brien operated the Labour Party's Drimnagh, Dublin Branch, but resigned from the party when the workers-republic cause was deleted from its constitution in 1939. During the 1930s, she was a statistician in the Irish Transport and General Workers Union (ITGWU) and a telegraph agent during the Second World War, until ill-health forced her retirement.

In 1940 Connolly O'Brien was briefly involved with Córas na Poblachta, an attempt by the IRA to create its own political party. The venture didn't go far. For whatever reason, Connolly O'Brien did not show much interest in the much more successful organisation of the same concept, Clann na Poblachta, which featured many of Ireland's Republican and left-wing figures amongst its ranks.

She was nominated to the Seanad Éireann in 1957 by nomination of the Taoiseach, Éamon de Valera, and stressed that she would not join his Fianna Fáil Party and remain independent, although she is listed as a Fianna Fáil senator. During her time, she opposed many bills, including the 1959 proposal to abolish proportional representation and a church-promoted bill to consign female juvenile offenders to Magdalene Laundries. She was re-nominated in 1965 by Seán Lemass, but in 1969, his successor Jack Lynch did not nominate her, ending her career in the Oireachtas.

=== Support for Republicans during The Troubles ===
Connolly O'Brien supported the Provisional IRA during The Troubles, suggesting "the present fight in the North of Ireland [is] the continuation of the battle for which [Connolly] died".

In 1977, she gave the funeral oration of INLA chief of staff Seamus Costello, saying, "Of all the politicians and political people with whom I have had conversations, and who called themselves followers of Connolly, he was the only one that truly understood what James Connolly meant when he spoke of his vision of the freedom of the Irish people."

On 8 July 1978, Connolly O'Brien opened James Connolly House on Chamberlain Street in Derry, the headquarters of the Irish Republican Socialist Party in Derry city.

Shortly before her death in 1981, she spoke at the 1980 Ardfheis of Sinn Féin. During her appearance she shook the hand of blanketman Martin Lawlor and praised the 1980 hunger strike.

== Death ==
Nora Connolly O'Brien died in Meath Hospital, Dublin, on 17 June 1981, ten days after being admitted due to failing health. She was the last of seven children. She had no children of her own. Her husband Seamus had died in 1962. She is buried in Dublin's Glasnevin Cemetery.

Before she died, she asked to be given a Republican funeral. More than 200 people gathered at her graveside in Glasnevin on that date, and her life was celebrated in the Church of Our Lady of Good Counsel, Drimnagh. The Taoiseach, Charles Haughey, did not attend her funeral, even though he had planned to do so; when asked to comment on his absence, he refused, but sources claimed that Haughey decided to avoid the funeral because of its overtly Republican nature.

In the book Studies in Irish radical leadership, Máirtín Ó Cadhain suggests that following the collapse of the Republican Congress, Connolly O'Brien took a dim view of Communists and that she came to reject the idea of Irish republican legitimism in favour of accepting the reality of the Irish state, evidenced by her acceptance of the position as a senator. For this, Ó Cadhain suggests Connolly O'Brien was a representation of "Republican Labour" in search of a party.

== Bibliography ==
- The Irish Rebell (1916)
- The Unbroken Tradition (1918)
- Portrait of a Rebel Father aka Born of a Rebel Father(1935)
- James Connolly Wrote for Today – Socialism (1978)
- We Shall Rise Again (1981, Mosquito Press)
