= Irish Congress of Trade Unions =

Umbrella organization for trade unions

Congress
- Irish Congress of Trade Unions
- Comhdháil na gCeardchumann
- Founded: 1959
- Headquarters: Dublin, Ireland
- Location: Ireland (Republic of Ireland, Northern Ireland)
- Members: 602,000 (ROI); 250,000 (NI)
- Key people: Phil Ní Sheaghdha, President; Owen Reidy, General Secretary
- Affiliations: ITUC, ETUC, TUAC
- Website: Republic Northern Ireland

The Irish Congress of Trade Unions (often abbreviated to just Congress or ICTU), formed in 1959 by the merger of the Irish Trades Union Congress (founded in 1894) and the Congress of Irish Unions (founded in 1945), is a national trade union centre, the umbrella organisation to which trade unions in both the Republic of Ireland and Northern Ireland affiliate.

== Influence ==
There are currently 55 trade unions with membership of Congress, representing about 600,000 members in the Republic of Ireland. Trade union members represent 35.1% of the Republic's workforce. This is a significant decline since the 55.3% recorded in 1980 and the 38.5% reported in 2003. In the Republic, roughly 50% of union members are in the public sector. The ICTU represents trade unions in negotiations with employers and the government with regard to pay and working conditions.

In Northern Ireland, Congress represents 250,000 members.

== Structure ==
The supreme policy-making body of Congress is the Biennial Delegate Conference, to which affiliated unions send delegates. On a day-to-day basis Congress is run by an executive committee and a staffed secretariat headed up by the general secretary, Owen Reidy who succeeded Patricia King in the position in 2022.

Phil Ní Sheaghdha of the Irish Nurses and Midwives Organisation (INMO) became President of Congress at the biennial conference in Belfast in July 2025 succeeding Justin McCamphill of the NASUWT. The president serves for a two-year period and is normally succeeded by one of two vice-presidents.

Congress is the sole Irish affiliate of the ETUC, the representative body for trade unions at European level and of the International Trade Union Confederation ITUC

== Social pacts ==
Congress enjoyed unprecedented political and economic influence over the period from 1987 to 2009 under the umbrella of Ireland's social partnership arrangements. This involved a series of seven corporatist agreements with the government and the main manufacturing/services employer body IBEC and the construction employers' lobby, CIF (Construction Industry Federation). It was a classic European-style alliance of government, labour and capital built on six decades of voluntary employment relations regulated by state institutions such as the Labour Court.

For many years the union leaders agreed to dampen pay rises in return for regular reductions in income tax rates. They also negotiated a new system of pay determination for public service employees under the rubric of "benchmarking" using external assessment of pay scales for assorted grades.

The era of Christian democratic style corporatism also saw a dramatic fall in trade union density from 62% in 1980 to 31% in 2007 and consolidation through mergers of many affiliated trade unions. Efforts to launch recruitment and organising initiatives failed to secure adequate support from affiliated unions while attempts to secure indirect forms of union recognition through legislation collapsed after successful legal challenges and appeals by the anti-union Ryanair company.

Ireland's period of centralised 'social pacts' ended in late 2009 when the government imposed pay cuts of between 5% and 8% on public service employees. The joint-stewardship of the state's FÁS training and employment authority by Congress and IBEC and accompanied waste of public and EU funds and excessive spending on directors 'junkets' further weakened the public standing of Congress and its 'social partnership' structures.

In an assessment of the post-partnership situation, Congress general secretary David Begg prepared a strategic review paper in which he identified the increasing weakness of the Congress and individual trade unions being due to "recession and change in the balance of power with capital" as well as job cuts, poor organisation, especially in high-technology companies, and a growing rift between public and private sector employees.

On a more positive note Begg asserted that the ending of social partnership arrangements "liberates us to advocate and campaign for our own policies".

== Other activities ==
A "mass rally", organised by the Irish Congress of Trade Unions, Amnesty International, and the Rainbow Project in support of same-sex marriage in Northern Ireland took place on 13 June 2015 in Belfast, with a 20,000 person turnout.

== Affiliated unions ==
- Association of First Division Civil Servants
- Association of Higher Civil and Public Servants
- Association of Irish Traditional Musicians
- Association of Secondary Teachers, Ireland
- Bakers, Food and Allied Workers Union
- British Actors Equity Association
- Broadcasting Entertainment Cinematograph and Theatre Union
- Building and Allied Trades' Union
- Chartered Society of Physiotherapy
- Communication Workers Union (Ireland)
- Communication Workers Union (UK)
- Connect Trade Union
- Energy Services Union
- Fire Brigades Union
- Fórsa
- GMB Union
- Guinness Staff Union
- Irish Bank Officials' Association
- Irish Federation of University Teachers
- Irish Medical Organisation
- Irish National Teachers Organisation
- Irish Nurses and Midwives Organisation
- MANDATE
- Medical Laboratory Scientists Association
- National Union of Journalists
- National Association of Schoolmasters Union of Women Teachers
- Northern Ireland Public Service Alliance
- National Union of Rail, Maritime and Transport Workers
- Operative Plasterers and Allied Trades Society of Ireland
- Prison Officers' Association (Ireland)
- Prospect
- Public and Commercial Services Union
- SIPTU (Services Industrial Professional Technical Union)
- Society of Radiographers
- Teachers' Union of Ireland
- Technical Engineering and Electrical Union
- Transport Salaried Staffs Association
- Ulster Teachers' Union
- Union of Shop, Distributive and Allied Workers
- Unison
- Unite the Union
- University and College Union
- Veterinary Ireland
- Veterinary Officers Association

=== Former members ===
- ACCORD
- Association of Teachers and Lecturers
- Civil and Public Services Union
- Irish Municipal, Public and Civil Trade Union
- National Union of Sheet Metal Workers of Ireland
- Prison Officers' Association (Northern Ireland)
- Public Service Executive Union
- Union of Construction, Allied Trades and Technicians

== General Secretaries ==
1959: James Larkin Jnr
1960: Leo Crawford and Ruaidhri Roberts
1967: Ruaidhri Roberts
1982: Donal Nevin
1989: Peter Cassells
2001: David Begg
2015: Patricia King
2022: Owen Reidy

== Presidents ==
Year	President	Union
1959	John Conroy	Irish Transport and General Workers' Union
1960	James Larkin Jnr	Workers' Union of Ireland
1961	Norman Kennedy	Amalgamated Transport and General Workers' Union
1962	Billy Fitzpatrick	Irish Union of Distributive Workers and Clerks
1963	Jack Macgougan	National Union of Tailors and Garment Workers
1964	Charles McCarthy	Vocational Teachers' Association
1965	Dominick Murphy	Transport Salaried Staffs' Association
1966	Fintan Kennedy	Irish Transport and General Workers' Union
1967	Bob Thompson	General and Municipal Workers' Union
1968	John Conroy	Irish Transport and General Workers' Union
1969	Jimmy Dunne	Marine Port and General Workers' Union
1970	James Morrow	Amalgamated Union of Engineering and Foundry Workers
1971	Maurice Cosgrave	Post Office Workers' Union
1972	Jim Cox	Amalgamated Society of Woodworkers
1972–73	Stephen McGonagle	Irish Transport and General Workers' Union
1974	Denis Larkin	Workers' Union of Ireland
1975	Andy Barr	National Union of Sheet Metal Workers, Coppersmiths, Heating and Domestic Engineers
1976	Matt Griffin	Irish National Teachers' Organisation
1977	Brendan Harkin	Northern Ireland Civil Service Alliance
1977–78	John Mulhall	Irish National Painters' and Decorators' Trade Union
1979	Harold O'Sullivan	Local Government and Public Services Union
1980	Jack Curlis	General and Municipal Workers' Union
1981	Dan Murphy	Civil Service Executive Union
1982	David Wylie	Union of Shop, Distributive and Allied Workers
1983	Paddy Cardiff	Federated Workers' Union of Ireland
1984	James Graham	Amalgamated Union of Engineering Workers
1985	Matt Merrigan	Amalgamated Transport and General Workers' Union
1986	Jim McCusker	Northern Ireland Public Service Alliance
1987	John Carroll	Irish Transport and General Workers' Union
1988	William Wallace	National Union of Tailors and Garment Workers
1989	Gerry Quigley	Irish National Teachers' Organisation
1990	Jimmy Blair	Amalgamated Engineering Union
1991	Christy Kirwan	SIPTU
1991–93	Tom Douglas	GMB Union
1993–95	Phil Flynn	Irish Municipal, Public and Civil Trade Union
1995–97	John Freeman	Amalgamated Transport and General Workers' Union
1997–99	Edmund Browne	SIPTU
1999–2001	Inez McCormack	UNISON
2001–03	Joe O'Toole	Irish National Teachers' Organisation
2003–05	Brendan Mackin	Amicus
2005–07	Peter McLoone	Irish Municipal, Public and Civil Trade Union
2007–09	Patricia McKeown	UNISON
2009–11	Jack O'Connor	SIPTU
2011–13	Eugene McGlone	Unite
2013–15	John Douglas	Mandate
2015–17	Brian Campfield	Northern Ireland Public Service Alliance
2017–19	Sheila Nunan	Irish National Teachers' Organisation
2019–21	Gerry Murphy	Irish National Teachers' Organisation
2021–23	Kevin Callinan	Fórsa
2023–25	Justin McCamphill	NASUWT
2025-27	Phil Ní Sheaghdha	Irish Nurses and Midwives Organisation

== Treasurers ==
1959: Walter Beirne
1960: John Conroy
1967: Fintan Kennedy
1982: Patrick Clancy
1985: Christy Kirwan
1989: Edmund Browne
1995: Bill Attley
1999: Jimmy Somers
2001: John McDonnell
2003: Joe O'Flynn
2019: Joe Cunningham

== See also ==
- List of trade unions
- List of federations of trade unions
- Trades Union Congress
- General Federation of Trade Unions (UK)
- Scottish Trades Union Congress
