= Ruaidhri Roberts =

Irish trade unionist (1917–1986)

Ruaidhri Roberts (1 January 1917 – February 1986) was an Irish trade union leader.

Born in Dublin, Roberts attended Belvedere College and University College Dublin before joining the accounts department of Bord na Móna. In 1945, he was appointed as general secretary of the Irish Trades Union Congress (ITUC), which had just suffered a major split with the Congress of Irish Unions leaving. Roberts kept the ITUC going and led negotiations with Congress which resulted in the two merging in 1959 to form the Irish Congress of Trade Unions (ICTU).

Roberts soon became joint general secretary of the ICTU, then in 1966 took sole responsibility until his retirement in 1981. In retirement, he served on the board of the Irish Sugar Company and as president of The People's College.

Trade union offices
Preceded by Thomas Johnson	General Secretary of the Irish Trades Union Congress; 1945–1959	Succeeded by Position abolished
Preceded by James Larkin Jnr	General Secretary of the Irish Congress of Trade Unions; 1959–1981; With: Leo Crawford (1959–1966)	Succeeded by Donal Nevin
