= Association of Higher Civil and Public Servants =

- Founded: 1943
- Headquarters: Fleming's Hall, Dublin
- Location: Ireland
- Members: 3,000
- Key people: Ciaran Rohan (General Secretary)
- Affiliations: Irish Congress of Trade Unions
- Website: www.ahcps.ie

The Association of Higher Civil and Public Servants (AHCPS) is a trade union representing senior civil servants and other managers in Ireland.

The union was founded in 1943, and affiliated to the Irish Congress of Trade Unions in 1978. Despite its name, it represents not only civil servants, but also managers in other organisations in the state sector.

The Veterinary Officers' Association works closely with the AHCPS, which takes responsibility for its negotiation and representation.

== General Secretaries ==
1975: Ralph Pares
1979: John Dowling
1986: Seán Ó Ríordáin
2007: Dave Morris
2014: Ciarán Rohan
