= Donal Nevin =

Donal Nevin (20 January 1924 – 16 December 2012) was an Irish trade unionist.

Born in Limerick, Nevin was educated at a Christian Brothers school before joining the civil service. His next job, from 1949, was as research officer of the Irish Trades Union Congress. In 1959, this merged with the rival Congress of Irish Unions to form the Irish Congress of Trade Unions (ICTU), and Nevin continued as its research officer until 1966, when he was promoted to become Assistant General Secretary. In this role, he became known for campaigning against apartheid in South Africa and calling for a boycott of that country's products.

Nevin involved himself in Irish civil society, as a founder of the Economic and Social Research Institute in 1960, and a member of the Irish Times Trust from 1974 until 2002. He was also chairman of the Labour Party's Dublin Regional Council, although he chose not to stand for election himself.

In 1982, Nevin became General Secretary of the ICTU, and he developed the social partnership model continued by his immediate successors. He retired in 1989 and pursued his interests in trade union history, publishing Trade Union Century in 1994, a biography of James Connolly, and an anthology of work by his personal hero, Jim Larkin.

Trade union offices
Preceded by Ruaidhri Roberts	General Secretary of the Irish Congress of Trade Unions; 1982–1989	Succeeded by Peter Cassells
