= James Larkin =

Irish socialist and trade union leader (1874–1947)

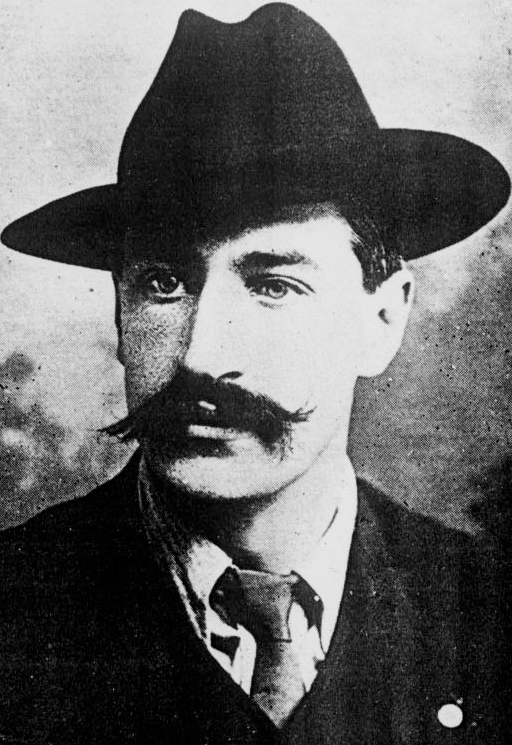
- Larkin, c.1910

Teachta Dála
- In office June 1943 – May 1944
- In office July 1937 – June 1938
- Constituency: Dublin North-East
- In office September 1927 – September 1927
- Constituency: Dublin North

Personal details
- Born: 28 January 1874 Toxteth,Liverpool, England
- Died: 30 January 1947 (aged 73) Dublin, Ireland
- Resting place: Glasnevin Cemetery, Dublin
- Party: Independent Labour Party (from 1893); Labour Party (1912–23; 1941–47); Socialist Party of America (1914–19); Irish Worker League (1923–27)
- Spouse: Elizabeth Brown (m. 1903; died 1945) (separated 1923)
- Children: 4, including James Jnr and Denis
- Relatives: Delia Larkin (sister)
- Occupation: Docker, Labour leader, Socialist activist, Trade union leader

Military service
- Branch/service: Irish Citizen Army
- Years of service: 1913–1914
- Rank: Commandant
- Conflicts: Dublin lock-out

James Larkin (28 January 1874 – 30 January 1947), sometimes known as Jim Larkin or Big Jim, was an Irish republican, socialist and trade union leader. He was one of the founders of the Irish Labour Party along with James Connolly and William O'Brien, and later the founder of the Irish Worker League (a communist party which was recognised by the Comintern as the Irish section of the world communist movement), as well as the Irish Transport and General Workers' Union (ITGWU) and the Workers' Union of Ireland (the two unions later merged to become SIPTU, Ireland's largest trade union). Along with Connolly and Jack White, he was also a founder of the Irish Citizen Army (ICA; a paramilitary group which was integral to both the Dublin lock-out and the Easter Rising). Larkin was a leading figure in the Syndicalist movement.

Larkin was born to Irish parents in Toxteth, Liverpool, England. Growing up in poverty, he received little formal education and began working in a variety of jobs while still a child. He became a full-time trade union organiser in 1905. Larkin moved to Belfast in 1907, where he was involved in trade unionism and syndicalist strike action including organising the 1907 Belfast Dock strike. Larkin later moved south and organised workers in Dublin, Cork and Waterford, with considerable success. He founded the Irish Transport and General Workers' Union after his expulsion from the National Union of Dock Labourers for his taking part in strike action in Dublin against union instructions, this new union would quickly replace the NUDL in Ireland. He later moved to Dublin which would become the headquarters of his union and the focus of his union activity, as well as where the Irish Labour Party would be formed.

Larkin is perhaps best known for his role in organising the 1913 strike that led to the Dublin lock-out. The lock-out was an industrial dispute over workers' pay and conditions as well as their right to organise, and received worldwide attention and coverage. It has been described as the "coming of age of the Irish trade union movement". The Irish Citizen Army was formed during the lock-out to protect striking workers from police violence. Not long after the lockout Larkin assumed direct command of the ICA, beginning the process of its reform into a revolutionary paramilitary organisation by arming them with Mauser rifles bought from Germany by the Irish Volunteers and smuggled into Ireland at Howth in July 1914.

In October 1914, Larkin left Ireland and travelled to America to raise funds for the ITGWU and the ICA, leaving Connolly in charge of both organisations. During his time in America, Larkin became involved in the socialist movement there, becoming a member of the Socialist Party of America (SPA). Larkin then became involved in the early communist movement in America, and he was later jailed in 1920 in the midst of the Red Scare after being found guilty of "criminal anarchy". He then spent several years in Sing Sing, before he was eventually pardoned by the Governor of New York Al Smith in 1923 and later deported. Larkin then returned to Ireland where he again became involved in Irish socialism and politics, both in the Labour Party and then his newly formed Irish Worker League. Connolly by this time had been executed for his part in the Easter Rising and Larkin mourned the passing of his friend and colleague.

After he lost control of the ITGWU, Larkin formed the Workers' Union of Ireland (WUI). The WUI was affiliated to Red International of Labour Unions (Profintern) soon after its formation. Larkin served as a Teachta Dála (TD) on three occasions, and two of his sons (James Larkin Jnr and Denis Larkin) also served as TDs. Jim Larkin served as Labour Party deputy in Dáil Éireann from 1943 to 1944, leaving Dáil Éireann for the last time in 1944, and dying in Dublin in 1947. Catholic Archbishop of Dublin John Charles McQuaid gave his funeral mass, and the ICA in its last public appearance escorted his funeral procession through Dublin to his burial site at Glasnevin Cemetery.

Larkin was respected by commentators both during and after his lifetime, with George Bernard Shaw describing him as the "greatest Irishman since Parnell", his friend and colleague in the labour movement James Connolly describing him as a "man of genius, of splendid vitality, great in his conceptions, magnificent in his courage", and Vladimir Lenin noting him as 'a remarkable speaker and a man of seething energy [who] performed miracles amongst the unskilled workers'. However other commentators have noted that Larkin was "vilified as a wrecker by former comrades", with anthologist Donal Nevin noting that some of Larkin's actions, including his attacks on others in the labour movement, meant Larkin had "alienated practically all the leaders of the movement [and] the mass of trade union members" by the mid-1920s.

"Big Jim" Larkin continues to occupy a position in Dublin's collective memory and streetscape, with a statue of him unveiled on O'Connell Street in 1979.

== Early years ==
Larkin was said to have been born on 21 January 1876, and this was the date that he himself believed was accurate. However, it is now believed that he was actually born on 28 January 1874. He was the second eldest son of Irish emigrants, James Larkin, from Drumintee and Mary Ann McNulty, from Burren, County Down. The impoverished Larkin family lived in the slums of Liverpool during the early years of his life. From the age of seven, he attended school in the mornings and worked in the afternoons to supplement the family income, a common arrangement in working-class families at the time. At the age of fourteen, after the death of his father, he was apprenticed to the firm his father had worked for but was dismissed after two years. He was unemployed for a time and then worked as a sailor and docker. By 1903, he was a dock foreman, and on 8 September of that year, he married Elizabeth Brown.

From 1893, Larkin developed an interest in socialism and became a member of the Independent Labour Party. In 1905, he was one of the few foremen to take part in a strike on the Liverpool docks. He was elected to the strike committee and, although he lost his foreman's job as a result, his performance so impressed the National Union of Dock Labourers (NUDL) that he was appointed a temporary organiser. He later gained a permanent position with the union, which, in 1906, sent him to Scotland, where he successfully organised workers in Preston and Glasgow. Larkin campaigned against Chinese immigration, presenting it as a threat that would undercut workers, leading processions in 1906 in Liverpool with fifty dockers dressed as 'Chinamen', wearing faux-'pigtails' and wearing powder to provide a 'yellow countenance'.

== Organising Irish labour movement (1907–1914) ==
=== Belfast Dock Strike ===
In January 1907, Larkin undertook his first task on behalf of the trade union movement in Ireland, when he arrived in Belfast to organise the city's dock workers for the NUDL. He succeeded in unionising the workforce and, because employers refused to meet the wage demands, he called the dockers out on strike in June. The Belfast Dock strike was soon joined by carters and coalmen, the latter settling their dispute after a month. With active support from the Independent Orange Order and its Grand Master, R. Lindsay Crawford, urging the "unity of all Irishmen", Larkin succeeded in uniting Protestant and Catholic workers and even persuaded the local Royal Irish Constabulary to strike at one point, but the strike ended by November without having achieved significant success. Tensions regarding leadership arose between Larkin and NUDL general secretary James Sexton. The latter's handling of negotiations and agreement to a disastrous settlement for the last of the strikers resulted in a lasting rift between Sexton and Larkin.

=== Formation of Irish Transport and General Workers' Union and founding of the Irish Labour Party ===
In 1908, Larkin moved south and organised workers in Dublin, Cork and Waterford, with considerable success. His involvement, against union instructions, in a dispute in Dublin resulted in his expulsion from the NUDL. The union later prosecuted him for diverting union funds to give strike pay to Cork workers engaged in an unofficial dispute. After trial and conviction for embezzlement in 1910, he was sentenced to prison for a year. This was widely regarded as unjust, and the Lord-Lieutenant, Lord Aberdeen, pardoned him after he had served three months in prison. Also in 1908, Arthur Griffith during the Dublin carter's strike described Larkin as an "Englishman importing foreign political disruption into this country and putting native industry at risk".

After his expulsion from the NUDL, Larkin founded the Irish Transport and General Workers' Union (ITGWU) at the end of December 1908. The organisation exists today as the Services Industrial Professional & Technical Union (SIPTU). It quickly gained the affiliation of the NUDL branches in Dublin, Cork, Dundalk, Waterford and Sligo. The Derry and Drogheda NUDL branches stayed with the British union, and Belfast split along sectarian lines. Early in the new year, 1909, Larkin moved to Dublin, which became the main base of the ITGWU and the focus of all his future union activity in Ireland.

In June 1911, Larkin established a newspaper, The Irish Worker and People's Advocate, as a pro-labour alternative to the capitalist-owned press. This organ was characterised by a campaigning approach and the denunciation of unfair employers and of Larkin's political enemies. Its columns also included pieces by intellectuals. The paper was produced until its suppression by the authorities in 1915. Afterwards, the Worker metamorphosed into the new Ireland Echo.

In May 1912, in partnership with James Connolly and William O'Brien Larkin formed the Irish Labour Party as the political wing of the Irish Trades Union Congress. Later that year, he was elected to Dublin Corporation. He did not hold his seat long, as a month later he was removed because he had a criminal record from his conviction in 1910.

Under Larkin's leadership, the union continued to grow, reaching approximately 20,000 members in the time leading up to the Dublin lock-out. In August 1913 during the lock-out, Larkin was described by Vladimir Lenin as a 'talented leader' as well as 'a remarkable speaker and a man of seething energy [who] has performed miracles amongst the unskilled workers'.

== Dublin Lockout, 1913 ==
Officers of the Dublin Metropolitan Police break up a union rally during the lock-out

=== Build up to the lock-out, and its proceedings ===
In early 1913, Larkin achieved some successes in industrial disputes in Dublin and, notably, in the Sligo Dock strike; these involved frequent recourse to sympathetic strikes and blacking (boycotting) of goods. Two major employers, Guinness and the Dublin United Tramway Company, were the main targets of Larkin's organising ambitions. Both had craft unions for skilled workers, but Larkin's main aim was to unionise the unskilled workers as well. He coined the slogan "A fair day's work for a fair day's pay". Larkin advocated Syndicalism, which was a revolutionary brand of socialism. Larkin gained few supporters from within, particularly from the British Trades Union Congress who did not want strike action such as the lock-out to lead to a growth in radicalism.

Guinness staff were relatively well-paid and enjoyed generous benefits from a paternalistic management that refused to join a lockout of unionised staff by virtually all the major Dublin employers. This was far from the case on the tramways.

William Martin Murphy – The central opposing figure during the lock-out

The chairman of the Dublin United Tramway Company, industrialist and newspaper proprietor William Martin Murphy, was determined not to allow the ITGWU to unionise his workforce. On 15 August, he dismissed 40 workers he suspected of ITGWU membership, followed by another 300 over the next week. On 26 August 1913, the tramway workers officially went on strike. Led by Murphy, over 400 of the city's employers retaliated by requiring their workers to sign a pledge not to be a member of the ITGWU and not to engage in sympathetic strikes.

The resulting industrial dispute was the most severe in Ireland's history. Employers in Dublin engaged in a sympathetic lockout of their workers when the latter refused to sign the pledge, employing blackleg labour from Britain and from elsewhere in Ireland. Guinness, the largest employer in Dublin, refused the employers' call to lock out its workers but it sacked 15 workers who struck in sympathy. Dublin's workers, amongst the poorest in the whole of what was then the Great Britain and Ireland, were forced to survive on generous but inadequate donations from the British Trades Union Congress (TUC) and sources in Ireland, distributed by the ITGWU.

For seven months, the lockout affected tens of thousands of Dublin workers and employers, with Larkin portrayed as the villain by Murphy's three main newspapers, the Irish Independent, the Sunday Independent and the Evening Herald, and by other bourgeois publications in Ireland.

Other leaders in the ITGWU at the time were James Connolly and William O'Brien; influential figures such as Patrick Pearse, Constance Markievicz and W. B. Yeats supported the workers in the generally anti-Larkin Irish press. The Irish Worker published the names and addresses of strike-breakers, and the Irish Independent published the names and addresses of men and women who attempted to send their children out of the city to be cared for in foster homes in Belfast and Britain. However, Larkin never resorted to violence. He knew it would play into the hands of the anti-union companies, and that he could not build a mass trade union by wrecking the firms where his members worked.

A group including Tom Kettle and Thomas MacDonagh formed the Industrial Peace Committee to attempt to negotiate between employers and workers; the employers refused to meet them.

Larkin and others were arrested for sedition on 28 August, and he was released on bail later that day. Connolly told the authorities "I do not recognise the English government in Ireland at all. I do not even recognise the King except when I am compelled to do so." On 30 August, a warrant for Larkin's arrest was put out, claiming he had again been seditious and had incited people to riot and to pillage shops. When a meeting called by Larkin for Sunday 31 August 1913 was proscribed, Constance Markievicz and her husband Casimir disguised Larkin in Casimir's frock coat and trousers and stage makeup and beard, and Nellie Gifford, who was unknown to the police, led him into William Martin Murphy's Imperial Hotel, pretending to be her stooped, deaf old clergyman uncle (to disguise his instantly recognisable Liverpool accent). Larkin tore off his beard inside the hotel and raced to a balcony, where he shouted his speech to the crowd below. The police – some 300 Royal Irish Constabulary reinforcing Dublin Metropolitan Police – savagely baton-charged the crowd, injuring between 400 and 600 people. MP Handel Booth, who was present, said that the police "behaved like men possessed. They drove the crowd into the side streets to meet other batches of the government's minions, wildly striking with their truncheons at everyone within reach ... The few roughs got away first, most respectable people left their hats and crawled away with bleeding heads. Kicking victims when prostrate was a settled part of the police programme." Larkin went into hiding, charged with incitement to breach the peace. Larkin was later re-arrested, charged with sedition and was handed a 7-month imprisonment. The Attorney General claimed Larkin had said: "People make kings and can unmake them. I never said 'God Save the King', but in derision. I say it now in derision." to a crowd of 8,000 people from the windows of Liberty Hall. The sentence was widely seen as unjust. Larkin was released about a week later. As the lock out continued Larkin continued to speak out about the conditions being faced by workers and their families. On 4 October 1913 Larkin spoke at the lock out Tribunal of Inquiry:

When the position of the workers in Dublin was taken into consideration, was it any wonder that there was necessity for a Larkin to arise, and if there was one thing more than another in my life of which I will always be proud it was the part I have taken in rescuing the workers of Dublin from the brutalizing and degrading conditions under which they labored. We are out to break down racial and sectarian barriers. My suggestion to the employers is that if they want peace we are prepared to meet them, but if they want war, then war they will have.

=== Formation of the Irish Citizen Army ===
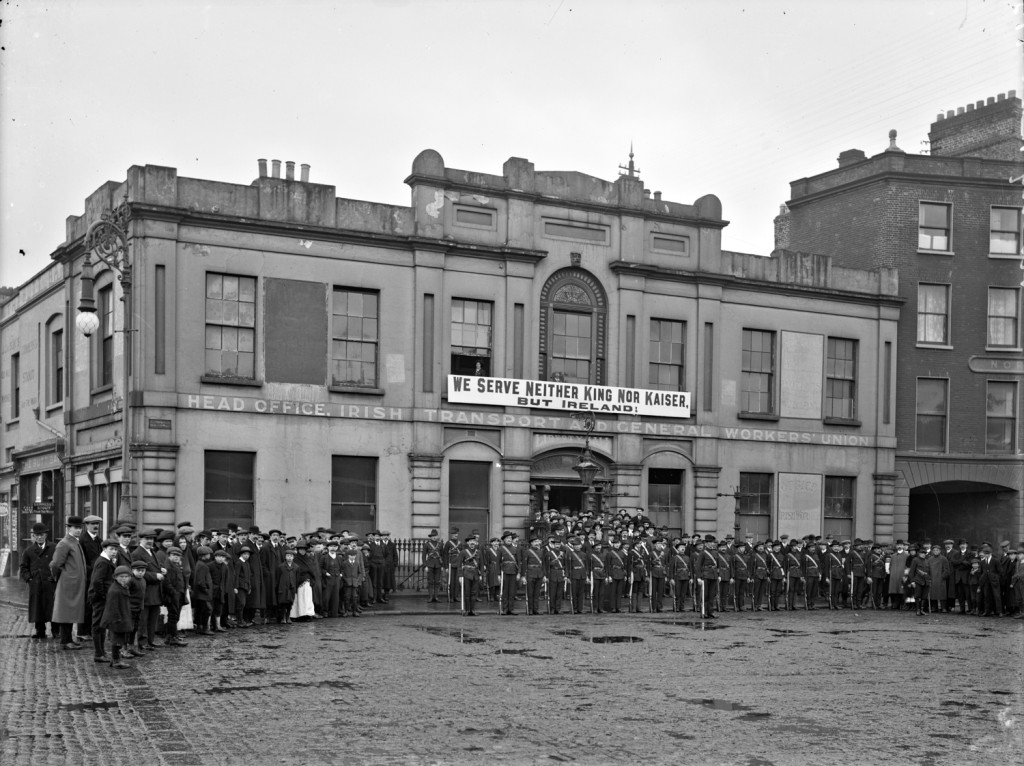
Members of the ICA outside of their Liberty Hall HQ in 1914

The violence at union rallies during the strike prompted Larkin to call for a workers' militia to be formed to protect themselves against the police, so Larkin, James Connolly, and Jack White created the Irish Citizen Army. The Citizen Army for the duration of the lock-out was armed with hurleys (sticks used in hurling, a traditional Irish sport) and bats to protect workers' demonstrations from the police. Jack White, a former Captain in the British Army, volunteered to train this army and offered £50 towards the cost of shoes to workers so that they could train. In addition to its role as a self-defence organisation, the Army, which was drilled in Croydon Park in Fairview by White, provided a diversion for workers unemployed and idle during the dispute.

=== End of the lock-out ===
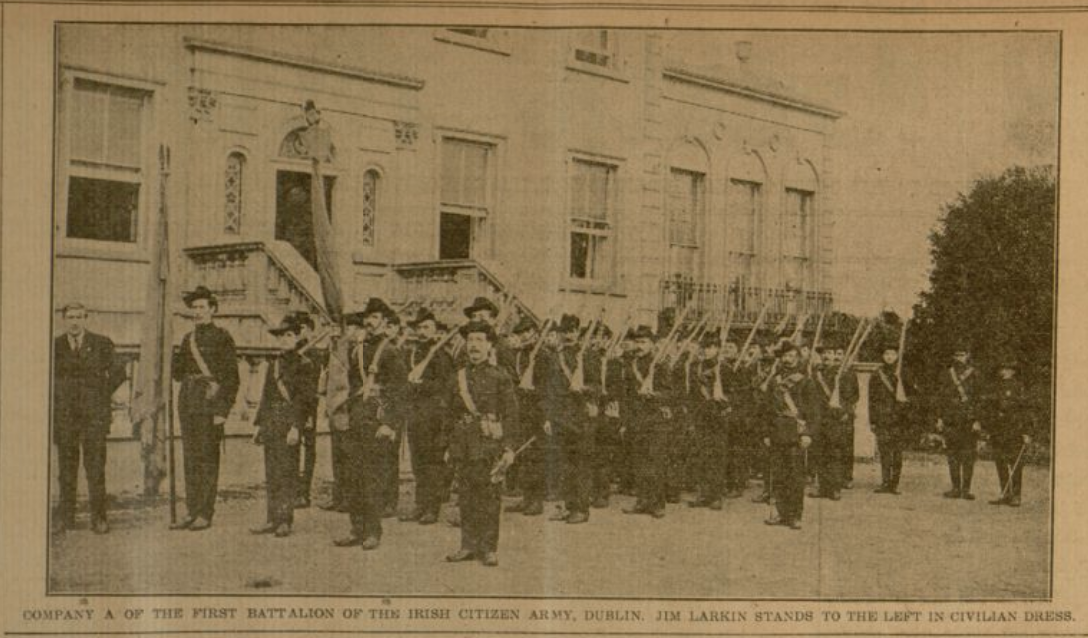
Jim Larkin with Company A of the ICA outside of Croydon House - the Mauser rifles from Howth are visible

The lock-out eventually concluded in early 1914 when calls by Connolly and Larkin for a sympathetic strike in Britain were rejected by the British TUC. Larkin's attacks on the TUC leadership for this stance also led to the cessation of financial aid to the ITGWU, which in any case was not affiliated with the TUC.

Although the efforts of the ITGWU and the smaller UBLU did not succeed in securing significantly better pay and conditions for the workers, they represented a turning point in Irish labor history. The principle of union action and workers' solidarity was firmly established. Perhaps even more importantly, Larkin's rhetoric condemning poverty and injustice and urging the oppressed to stand up for themselves left a lasting impression.

Not long after the lockout, Jack White resigned as commander and Larkin assumed direct command of the ICA. Beginning the process of its reform into a revolutionary paramilitary organisation by arming them with Mauser rifles bought from Germany by the Irish Volunteers and smuggled into Ireland at Howth in July 1914. A written constitution was established stating the Army's principles as follows: "the ownership of Ireland, moral and material, is vested of right in the people of Ireland" and to "sink all difference of birth property and creed under the common name of the Irish people".

== In the US - Socialist, Irish Republican and Communist activism (1914–1923) ==
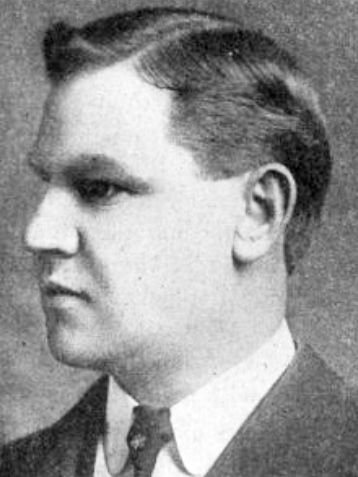
"Big" Bill Haywood, who first suggested a tour of the United States to Larkin

=== After the lock-out ===
Exhausted by the demands of organising union work, Larkin fell into bouts of depression, took a declining interest in the now crippled ITGWU, and became increasingly difficult to work with. Speculation had risen during the lock-out that he was planning to leave for America. A speaking tour of the New World had been suggested to Larkin by Bill Haywood in November 1913 and the following month. The growing speculation prompted the New York Times to publish an editorial simply titled 'Larkin is coming'. This dismayed colleagues in the ITGWU and Larkin felt obliged to deny that he was planning on running away. However, noting the effect of the strain of the lock-out on Larkin, union officials reluctantly concluded that a break would probably be of great benefit to him. Following the advice given by 'Big Bill', 'Big Jim' therefore left for America. His decision to leave dismayed many union activists, including a large number of his colleagues in the ITGWU. In addition to recuperating from the strain of the lockout and undertaking a tour of the United States, Larkin also intended to raise funds for the union and the fledgling ICA, and to rebuild their headquarters Liberty Hall. Many in the union assumed that Larkin's trip would be a short one and that he would soon return. However, it quickly became clear that this would not be the case. Shortly before his departure, he declined a request by the Irish Trades Union Congress to join a two-man mission to raise funds for the Labour Party, replying that if he went he would be 'going alone and freelance'. His intention was to agitate in America rather than organise, but it is unclear whether he intended to return. Larkin set sail for America on 25 October 1914, leaving long-time associate James Connolly in charge of the ITGWU and the ICA, the latter of which he would soon utilise as a revolutionary force.

=== Arriving in America - activism and links to espionage ===
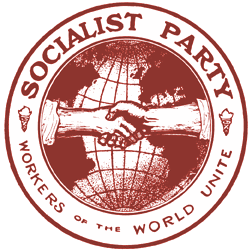
Larkin joined the Socialist Party of America shortly after his arrival.

Larkin arrived in New York on 5 November 1914. Following his arrival there were positive initial prospects. The lock-out had been widely reported in America and he was well received by socialists there. He found support from both socialists and Irish-Americans, who were eager to hear his position on the World War which was by now raging throughout Europe. Opposition to the war was intended to be his main position whilst in America. Upon presenting his credentials to the Socialist Party of America and John Devoy, the Irish leader of Clan na Gael (the leading Irish republican supporting organisation in America), his services were quickly taken up by both and he also became involved in the Industrial Workers of the World union (the Wobblies).

Within days of arriving in the country, he addressed a crowd of 15,000 people gathered at Madison Square Garden to celebrate the election of Socialist candidate Meyer London to the United States House of Representatives. Soon after his speech at Madison Square Garden, he was invited by Devoy to speak to a combined audience of German Uhlans and Irish Volunteers in Philadelphia, where he enthusiastically called for money and arms for the Republican cause in Ireland to a cheering crowd. During this speech, Larkin showed one of the rifles that had been smuggled into Ireland at Howth, which he noted could be better but still worked. (He added that better weapons could be obtained with more money.) He compared it with a rifle given to the Irish Volunteers by John Redmond, which was an obsolete weapon for which no new ammunition could be procured, using this to vilify Redmond as a traitor to the Irish people and who had had no intention of arming the movement effectively for Irish independence. He also claimed that in the process of receiving and protecting the guns, 100 of his men from the ICA with no ammunition or bayonets had faced and routed 150 of the King's Own Scottish Borderers, whom he disparagingly said had been referred to as 'England's best'. He went on to attack the First World War directly, particularly the efforts of the British to get men from Ireland to join their war effort, going on to say that if Ireland was to fight it would be against the British in an effort to create an Irish republic: 'Why should Ireland fight for Britain in this war? What has Britain ever done for our people? Whatever we got from her we wrested with struggle and sacrifice. No, men and women of the Irish race, we shall not fight for England. We shall fight for the destruction of the British Empire and the construction of an Irish republic. We shall not fight for the preservation of the enemy, which has laid waste with death and desolation the fields and hills of Ireland for 700 years. We will fight to free Ireland from the grasp of that vile carcase called England'.

In a speech to Clan na Gael in November 1914, Larkin promoted his Irish Republican ideals stating 'I assure you that the workers of Ireland are on the side of the dear, dark-haired mother, whose call they never failed to answer yet ... again will the call ring out over hill and dale to the men who have always answered the call of Caithlin-ni-Houlihan. For seven hundred long, weary years we have waited for this hour. The flowing tide is with us ... [and we must be] ready for the Rising of the Moon'. He went on to say, in the same speech, that 'The time is ripe for an active movement. We have waited years for this opportunity, and it could not come at a better time. We have the men and the plans, but only have 5000 rifles and no ammunition. Give us more guns and ammunition and we will not fail you. We have got something better than England ever had—destiny'. His speech was received well by the Clan and other nationalists, and his initial time with the clan was successful being asked to attend other speaking engagements.

Divisions began to appear, however, largely stemming from his anti-capitalist socialist ideals and pro-worker ideology, which were fundamentally at odds with many of the views of those in the clan and the Irish-America movement. Larkin's religious ideals were also at odds with the largely secular American left, so he effectively alienated himself from both movements and speaking engagements began to dwindle. His speeches had attracted interest from the German embassy and he had been approached by military Attachés shortly after his speech in Philadelphia and offered $200 per week to undertake waterfront sabotage work. Larkin refused on humanitarian grounds and informed them that he was already engaged in organising strikes that would effectively hamper the Allied war effort by restricting American war-related industry, and that he had established the Four Winds Fellowship a society open to all trade unionists and socialists born in the British Empire and who were opposed to the war. Elsewhere, he was reported as having said that he did not want a German victory, instead preferring a military deadlock, leading to workers' revolts in the belligerent countries, a desire which came partly true, following the Russian Revolution of 1917. This perceived association with German agents further distanced him from American socialists, and his reputation as a syndicalist and association with the Industrial Workers of the World was looked down on by the right wing of the Socialist Party of America.

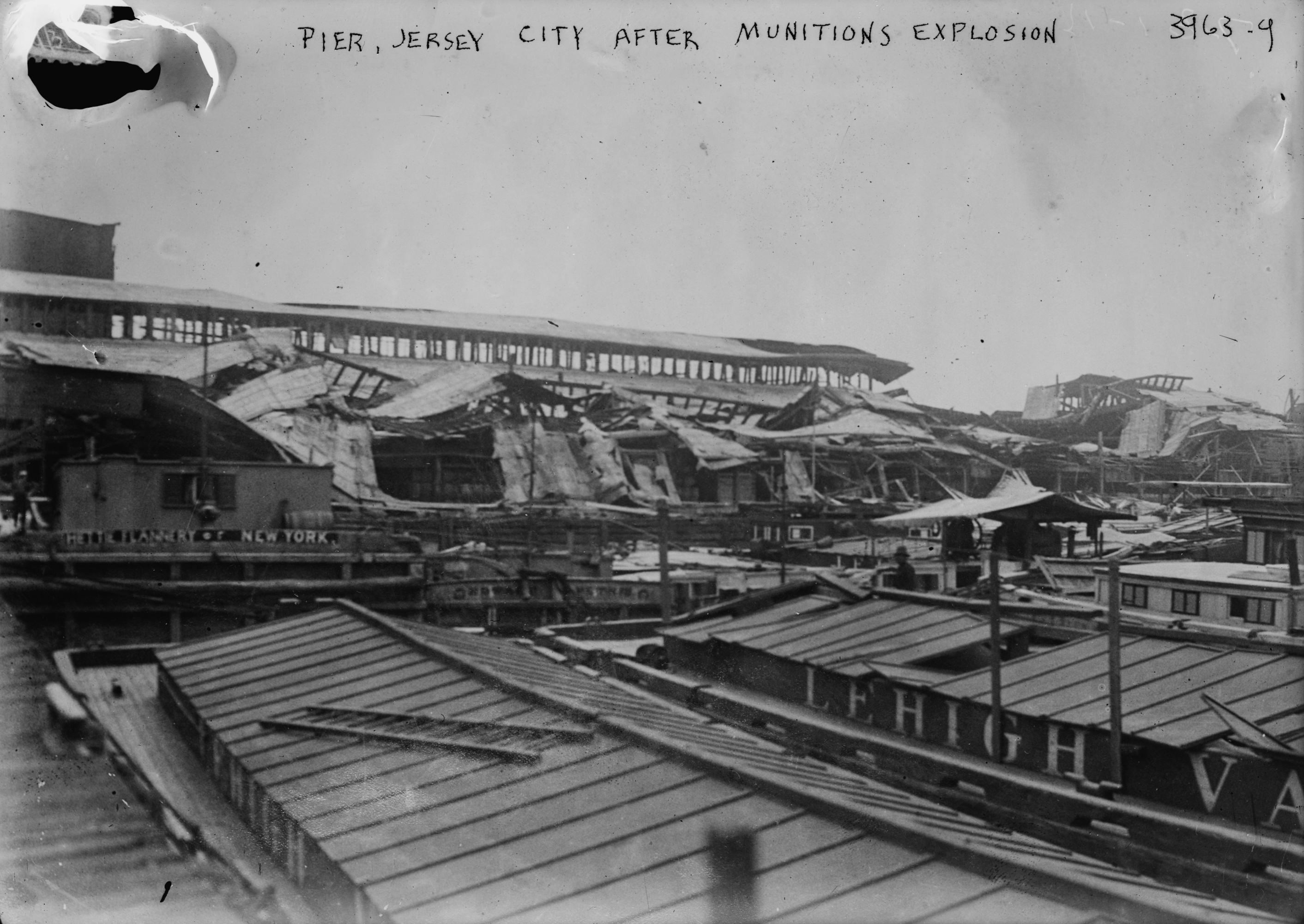
Aftermath of the Black Tom explosion, which Larkin was initially thought to have had some involvement with

Larkin was reported as having helped to disrupt Allied munitions shipments in New York City during World War I. In 1937, he voluntarily assisted US lawyers investigating the Black Tom explosion by providing an affidavit from his home in Dublin. According to British Army Intelligence officer, Henry Landau:

Larkin testified that he himself never took part in the actual sabotage campaign but, rather, confined himself to the organising of strikes to secure both higher pay and shorter hours for workmen and to prevent the shipment of munitions to the Allies.

Larkin, however, had first-hand knowledge of German sabotage operations, supplied them with intelligence and contacts and was involved in the transfer of monies from the Germans to Irish Republican causes. He maintained communication with his German contacts. However, they began to tire of his refusals to cooperate with violence and broke contact with him after a rendezvous in Mexico City in 1917.

=== Communism and arrest for "criminal anarchy" ===
Following this, Larkin briefly worked with the IWW in San Francisco, before settling in New York and becoming involved with the Socialist Party of America again. He took advantage of the growing support for left-wing politics, and also of the increasing support for Irish republicanism amongst Irish Americans to gain influence amongst its ranks. Larkin was instrumental in the establishment of the New York James Connolly Socialist Club on St Patrick's Day, 1918. Whilst in America, Larkin had become an enthusiastic supporter of the Soviets and, following an address at the club by Jack Reed, who had recently returned from Russia, interest in the Bolsheviks was revitalised. Larkin decided to put all his efforts into reforming the SPA into a communist party. This meant that he had to turn down an offer to lead the St Lawrence Mill Strike in March 1919. The Connolly Club became the national hub of the new communist project, housing the offices of Larkin's SPA faction's Revolutionary Age and Reed's Voice of Labour. In June 1919, Larkin topped the polls for elections to the national left-wing council. He supported the view that the left of the SPA should attempt to take control at its national convention in August. A minority faction favoured the immediate creation of a new communist party and left in protest. Larkin, along with numerous other sympathisers of the Bolsheviks, was expelled from the Socialist Party of America at its national convention during the Red Scare of that year. As a result of this exodus, two new parties were formed from the ranks of the SPA's communist former members, namely the American Communist Party and the Communist Labor Party of America. Favouring the latter, as he believed it to be more 'American' (something which he believed was crucial), Larkin joined their ranks.

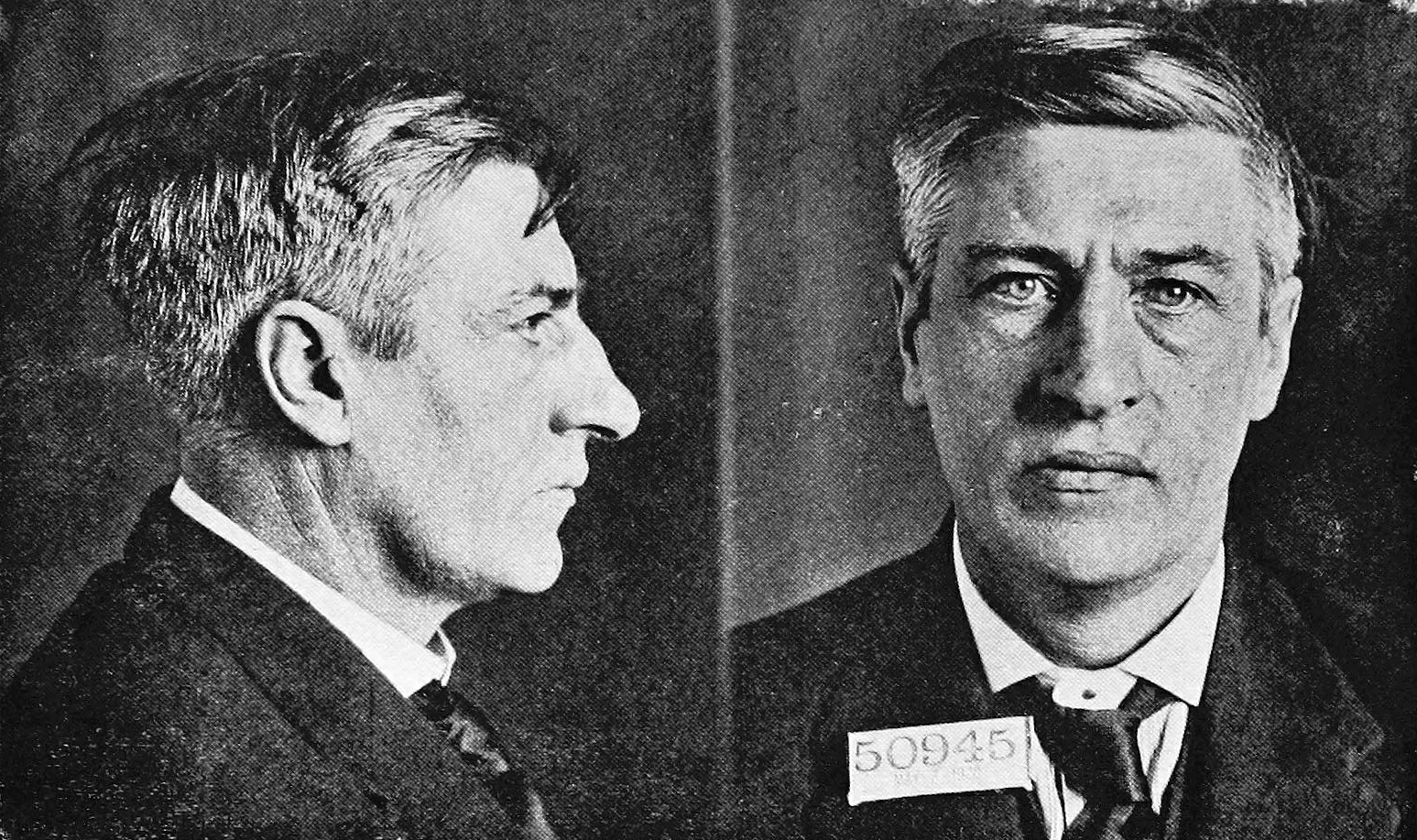
Jim Larkin at his 8 November 1919 booking for "criminal anarchism" in the state of New York

Larkin's speeches in support of the Soviets, his association with founding members of both the American Communist Party and Communist Labor Party of America, and his radical publications made him a target of the "First Red Scare" that was sweeping the US and he was arrested on 7 November 1919 during a series of anti-Bolshevik raids (see Palmer Raids). Larkin was charged with 'criminal anarchy' due to his part in the publishing of the SPA's 'Left-wing manifesto' in Revolutionary Age. Larkin was released on 20 November, after $15,000 bail was paid, of which John Devoy paid $5,000. He resumed his political activities but was under no illusion of what was to come, expecting to be handed a lengthy jail sentence. New York State Prosecutor Alexander Rourke took advantage of a query from Scotland Yard as to whether Larkin would be allowed to travel to South Africa to turn his allies in the Irish nationalist movement, including Devoy, against him. In reality, this request did not stem from any association with figures of authority in Britain, but rather a request by Archie Crawford, President of the South African Federation of Labour who wanted Larkin for a speaking tour of the country. A trial took place in which Larkin represented himself, presenting his view that his own beliefs rather than his deeds were on trial, and exhibiting a philosophy incorporating his new-found Bolshevism as well as his Christianity, Socialism, Syndicalism, Communism and Irish nationalism. Despite many onlookers being of the opinion that he had gained enough sympathy to divide the jury, Larkin's fears were instead realised: he was found guilty and sentenced to five to ten years, to be served in the notorious Sing Sing prison.

=== Time in prison ===
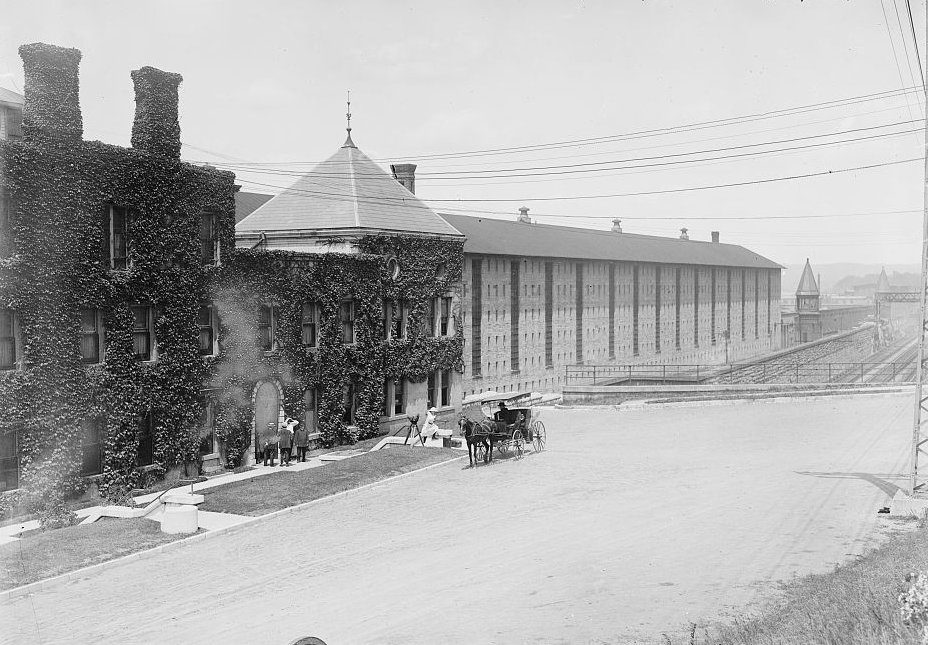
Sing Sing, the prison where Larkin spent most of his sentence

While most of his sentence was served at Sing Sing, Larkin also spent time in other prisons in America, briefly moving to Clinton prison (Dannemora) after only one month at Sing Sing. This move was in order to discourage visitation. A journalist from the New York Call managed to gain an interview with Larkin whilst he was incarcerated there, and the reported deterioration of Larkin's condition led to international protests which ultimately resulted in him moving back to Sing Sing later that year. Whilst at Sing Sing, Larkin was supplied with books and the means to write and communicate with the outside world. Keeping a keen eye on Irish affairs, Larkin sent a 'thunderous denunciation of the Anglo-Irish Treaty' to Dublin on 10 December 1921. Larkin's most famous visitor whilst he was imprisoned was Charlie Chaplin who noted that he was 'diffident' and 'concerned for his family', about whom he had heard nothing since his incarceration. Chaplin sent presents to Larkin's wife Elizabeth and their children. Larkin was later moved to Great Meadow, a comfortable, open prison, where he was visited by Constance Markievicz who, whilst noting his apparent appreciation of his conditions, also sensed his fretfulness at being cut off from politics. On 6 May 1922, Larkin was released before being rearrested shortly afterwards for another charge of criminal anarchy and served with a deportation warrant. Larkin appealed and, during his time out of jail, he was cabled by Grigory Zinoviev President of the Communist International (Comintern) who gave their 'warmest greetings to the undaunted fighter released from the "democratic" prisons'. In February of that year, Larkin had been elected to the Moscow Soviet to represent the Moscow International Communist Tailoring Factory by a union of tailors, most of them returnees to Russia from the USA. Larkin's court appeal failed and he was back in custody by 31 August, despite various plans being discussed, including a potential escape plan raised by Thomas Foran of the ITGWU and numerous legal challenges. Larkin decided to bide his time. During this time it was also arranged for Larkin's son, James, to visit him in prison.

=== Release and departure from the United States ===
The election of Irish-American Al Smith to the position of Governor of New York in November 1922 represented a change in circumstances and was also a clear indication that the Red Scare had largely abated. Smith granted Larkin a pardon hearing which was set for January 1923, the pardon was granted and he was released from prison. Foran cabled Larkin to convey the ITGWU's satisfaction with the events and to seek the date of his return to Ireland. Although Larkin had his mind set on a return to Ireland, he had grander plans than a return to union work. The Comintern wrote to Larkin on 3 February to express their 'great joy' at his release and to extend an invitation to visit Soviet Russia at his earliest opportunity, to 'discuss a number of burning questions affecting the international revolutionary movement'. Larkin made a number of financial requests to the ITGWU, including asking them to cover the costs of purchasing passage on a steamer ship, although he, in characteristic fashion, did not reveal the reason. The union's new leadership began to see him as out of touch, and that if allowed to do so he would attempt to restore his previous near-total command over the union. The union had also already spent large sums of money on Larkin's behalf—making sure his wife Elizabeth was taken care of, covering his medical expenses and covering the costs of James Jnr's visit to see him in America. For these reasons, the additional financial requests were denied, a decision which begat what would become an intense split in the union movement in Ireland. After lobbying the Secretary for Labor for a deportation order, which was granted, he was arrested and charged with being an alien activist. He was then taken to the British consulate where he was given a passport to travel by ship first to the United Kingdom and then to Ireland. Although Larkin had hoped to have been allowed to travel to Germany, Austria and Russia on business matters, this request was denied. On 21 April, he boarded a ship bound for Southampton and left America for good.

== Return to Ireland - communist activity and split in Irish trade union movement ==
Larkin's Irish Worker League was recognised as The Communist International's (Comintern) Ireland affiliate, and he was elected to the Executive Committee of Comintern in 1924.

Upon his return to Ireland in April 1923, Larkin received a hero's welcome and immediately set about touring the country, meeting trade union members and appealing for an end to the Irish Civil War. However, he soon found himself at variance with William O'Brien, who, in Larkin's absence, had become the leading figure in the ITGWU and the Irish Labour Party and Trades Union Congress. Larkin was still officially general secretary of the ITGWU. The ITGWU leaders (Thomas Foran, William O'Brien, Thomas Kennedy: all colleagues of Larkin during the Lockout) sued him. The bitterness of the court case between the former organisers of the 1913 Lockout would last over 20 years.

=== Formation of the Irish Worker League and involvement with Soviet Union ===
Larkin agreed with British and Soviet communists to take on the leadership of communism in Ireland and, in September 1923, Larkin formed the Irish Worker League (IWL), which was soon afterwards recognised by The Communist International (Comintern; a Soviet Union controlled international organisation that advocated world communism) as the Irish section of the world communist movement. The IWL enrolled 500 members on its inauguration and, following the death of Lenin on 21 January 1924, Larkin led a march of 6,000 people to mourn his passing. In March 1924, Larkin lost his battle for control of the ITWGU and, in May, the army prevented his followers from seizing Liberty Hall. In June 1924, Larkin attended the Comintern congress in Moscow and was elected to its Executive Committee.

The League's most prominent activity in its first year was to raise funds for imprisoned members of the Anti-Treaty IRA.

Larkin giving a speech on O'Connell Street shortly after his return from America - This photograph was later the basis for a statue of Larkin on the same street (see below)

During Larkin's absence from Ireland at the 1924 Comintern Congress in Moscow (and apparently against his instructions), his brother Peter took his supporters out of the ITGWU, forming the Workers' Union of Ireland (WUI). The new union quickly grew, gaining the allegiance of about two-thirds of the Dublin membership of the ITGWU and of a smaller number of rural members. It was affiliated to the Soviet Red International of Labour Unions (Promintern).

With Soviet support, Larkin sought to remove British unions from Ireland, seeing them as 'outposts of British imperialism'. It was also agreed that Irish sections of the communist movement would deal directly with Moscow and would have permanent representation there, rather than going through Britain. Larkin later launched a vicious attack on Tom Johnson who was now leader of the Labour Party and who like Larkin, was Liverpool-born. Johnson had been born to English parents but had spent much of his life in Ireland. Larkin, although born to Irish parents, had spent as long in the US as he had in Ireland. Larkin said that it was "time that Labour dealt with this English traitor. If they don't get rid of this scoundrel, they'll get the bullet and the bayonet in reward. There's nothing for it, but a dose of the lead which Johnson promises to those who look for work." This implied incitement to murder Johnson in a still-violent post-Civil War country resulted in the court awarding Johnson £1000 in libel damages against Larkin. In his 2006 biographical anthology, Donal Nevin noted that his attacks on colleagues in the labour movement, including those the subject of this libel action, meant that Larkin "alienated practically all the leaders of the movement [and] the mass of trade union members".

In January 1925, the Comintern sent Communist Party of Great Britain activist Bob Stewart to Ireland to establish a communist party in co-operation with Larkin. A formal founding conference of the Irish Worker League, which was to take up this role, was set for May 1925. A fiasco ensued when the organisers discovered at the last minute that Larkin did not intend to attend. Feeling that the proposed party could not succeed without him, they called the conference off as it was due to start in a packed room in the Mansion House, Dublin. Larkin perceived certain actions undertaken by Stewart as attempts to circumvent his authority, including sending a republican delegation to Moscow and directing £500 sent by the Russian Red Cross intended to aid the Irish famine relief effort to George Lansbury a left-wing British Labour M.P., rather than to the WUI.

Under pressure from Comintern to operate as a political party or risk losing affiliation, Larkin fielded three candidates at the September 1927 Irish general election; himself, his son James Larkin Jnr, and WUI President John Lawlor. Larkin ran in Dublin North and, in circumstances that surprised many, was elected, becoming the first and only communist to be elected to Dáil Éireann. However, as a result of a libel award won against him by William O'Brien, which he had refused to pay, he was an undischarged bankrupt and could not take up his seat. Between November of that year and March 1928, six students including Larkin's son James Larkin Jnr were sent to Moscow to attend the International Lenin School. In February 1928, Larkin made what would be his penultimate visit to Moscow for the ninth plenum of the Executive Committee of the Communist International. Here he departed from his usual subject matter. His public speeches in Russia were usually and almost exclusively centred on the need for trade union solidarity and largely avoided comment on communist politics. However, he now delivered a lecture on "Ireland, trade unions and the peasantry" at the Moscow Soviet, and asked the audience to support Josef Stalin. He also endorsed the Comintern line that the Communist Party of Great Britain should adopt a hostile rather than fraternal attitude towards the British Labour Party as well as denouncing the CPGB's refusal to back the removal of British unions from Ireland and their record on trade unions in general. Before leaving, Larkin warned Solomon Lozovsky (General Secretary of Profintern) that the WUI executive wanted to break with Profintern unless their promises were made good.

Relations between Larkin and Moscow would ultimately continue to strain, despite occasional apparent promise, and, in the time building up to the 1930s, the final break was fast approaching. In 1929, in a letter to Moscow, Larkin announced his retirement from active political work. However, he asked that the Irish at the Lenin School be supported, noting that James Jnr was "his own man and an earnest communist". Larkin would, in fact, continue to be politically active for all of his life and used the League as a political platform into the 1930s. He did, however, sever ties with Profintern, declaring that they had not given the WUI proper financial support and accusing Lozovsky of intriguing against him. In September 1929, a new communist group became active in Dublin but had orders not to "disturb the big noise", with Moscow fearing that Larkin would smash its initiatives in the city, whilst also secretly still hoping that Larkin would provide the mass base it desired in Ireland. Ultimately, Larkin would neither support communist activity nor oppose his successors.

Larkin's unsuccessful attempts to gain a position as a commercial agent in Ireland for the Soviet Union may have contributed to his disenchantment with Stalinism. The Soviets, for their part, had been increasingly impatient with what they saw as his ineffective leadership. From the early 1930s, Larkin drew away from the Soviet Union entirely. In the 1932 general election, he stood, without success, as a communist and, in 1933 and subsequently, he ran as "Independent Labour". The reasons for the eventual collapse in relations between the Soviet Union and Larkin can, to some extent, be put down to his underlying motivations. According to Emmet O'Connor, his aims were to "discredit the ITWGU, and Labour Party leadership, drive the British unions out of Ireland, and build an anti-imperialist front with republicans". His Syndicalist ideology was also largely out of place in a Leninist context, eventually being regarded by Comintern as a "first generation communist leader" whose ideology had been formed during the period prior to 1914. It is also claimed that he had, by this time, fallen into a degenerated state of egomania, was "violently" averse to being accountable to anyone but himself and consequently suspicious of anything that was outside of his own personal control. It could be said that some of Larkin's suspicions and apparent paranoias were justified, as it was clear that the Communist Party of Great Britain frequently attempted to circumvent him in liaising with the IRA and the Worker's Party behind his back. Additionally its Minority Movement blatantly ignored Profintern instructions and refused to honour the agreement on the withdrawal of British unions from Ireland, which resulted in Larkin directing much of his irritation on the matter towards Profintern.

One of Larkin's primary ambitions from his association with the Soviet Union was to finance his new trade union, and thus many of the same issues that had arisen from his time with James Connolly arose again. That being the hyperfocus on union activity, with political mobilisation an after thought, the Labour Party had suffered from this diversion of attention and so consequently did the IWL. Larkin had advocated revolutionary socialism. However, neither Larkin nor Connolly had focused on building a revolutionary party, frequently seeing political developments as only "an echo" of the industrial battle, and played down the need for a party that had a consistent and clear ideology and view of the world, thinking mass unionisation would be enough. At the height of the 1913 lock-out, when the men were at the height of their popularity, they made no particular concerted effort to recruit workers to a socialist party. This allowed other political parties to take advantage of much of their work, despite not having supported workers during the lock-out. Through a combination of a lack of cohesion and co-operation, an opportunity for a successful communist movement in Ireland, in a time when a revolutionary mentality still remained, was missed. This was perhaps a movement which only Larkin could have achieved, as an obvious figurehead who still remained widely popular amongst the Irish left, and with an Irish Labour movement which had swung towards Syndicalism. Communism in Ireland at this time also had a distinct lack of controversy surrounding it, with the IRA sending delegations to Moscow and maintaining a widespread and open association with Profintern. Following the Catholic Church's rallying against Communism from 1929 onwards, the mood quickly changed.

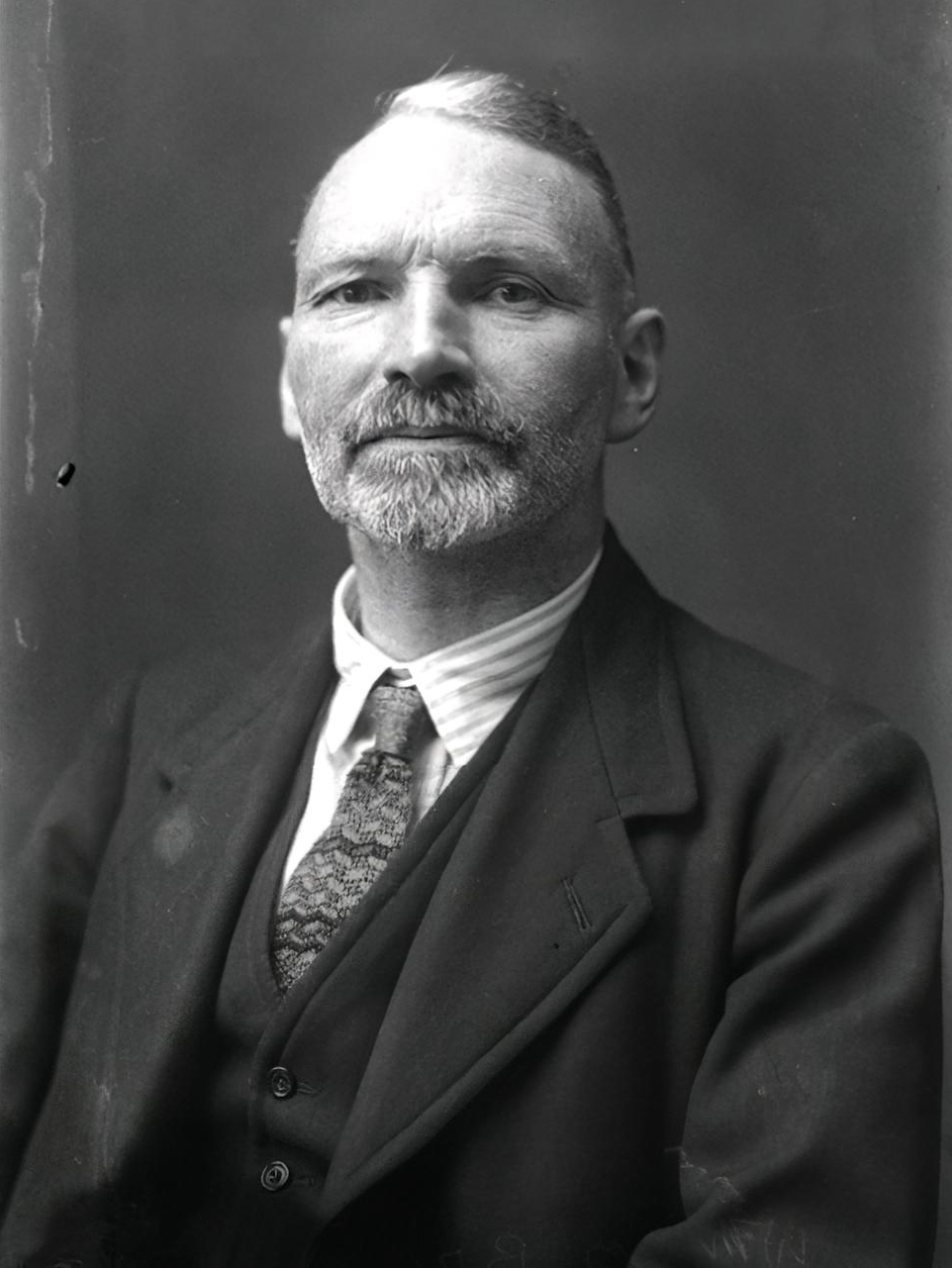
Larkin had a protracted and intense feud with William O'Brien during this period.

In 1934, Larkin gave important evidence on the 1916 Black Tom explosion to John J. McCloy, allowing a case for damages against Germany to be reopened, presumably because of Germany's new Nazi government.

During this period, he also engaged in a rapprochement with the Catholic Church, from whom he had become distant after the Church's vehement ostracisation of communism, which had followed a resurgence of Catholic social power, stemming from the centenary celebrations of Catholic emancipation in 1929, and the publishing of Quadragesimo anno in 1931. In 1936, he regained his seat on Dublin Corporation. He then regained his Dáil seat at the 1937 general election, but lost it again the following year. In that period, the Workers' Union of Ireland also entered the mainstream of the trade union movement, being admitted to the Dublin Trades Council in 1936, but the Irish Trades Union Congress would not accept its membership application until 1945.

=== Return to the Labour Party ===
In 1941, a new trade union bill was published by the Government. Inspired by an internal trade union restructuring proposal by William O'Brien, it was viewed as a threat by the smaller general unions and the Irish branches of British unions (known as the "amalgamated unions"). Larkin and the WUI played a leading role in the unsuccessful campaign against the bill. After its passage into law, he and his supporters successfully applied for admission to the Labour Party, where they were now regarded with more sympathy by many members. In response, O'Brien disaffiliated the ITGWU from the party, forming the rival National Labour Party and denouncing what he claimed was communist influence in Labour. Larkin later served as a Labour Party deputy in Dáil Éireann from 1943 to 1944.

== Death ==
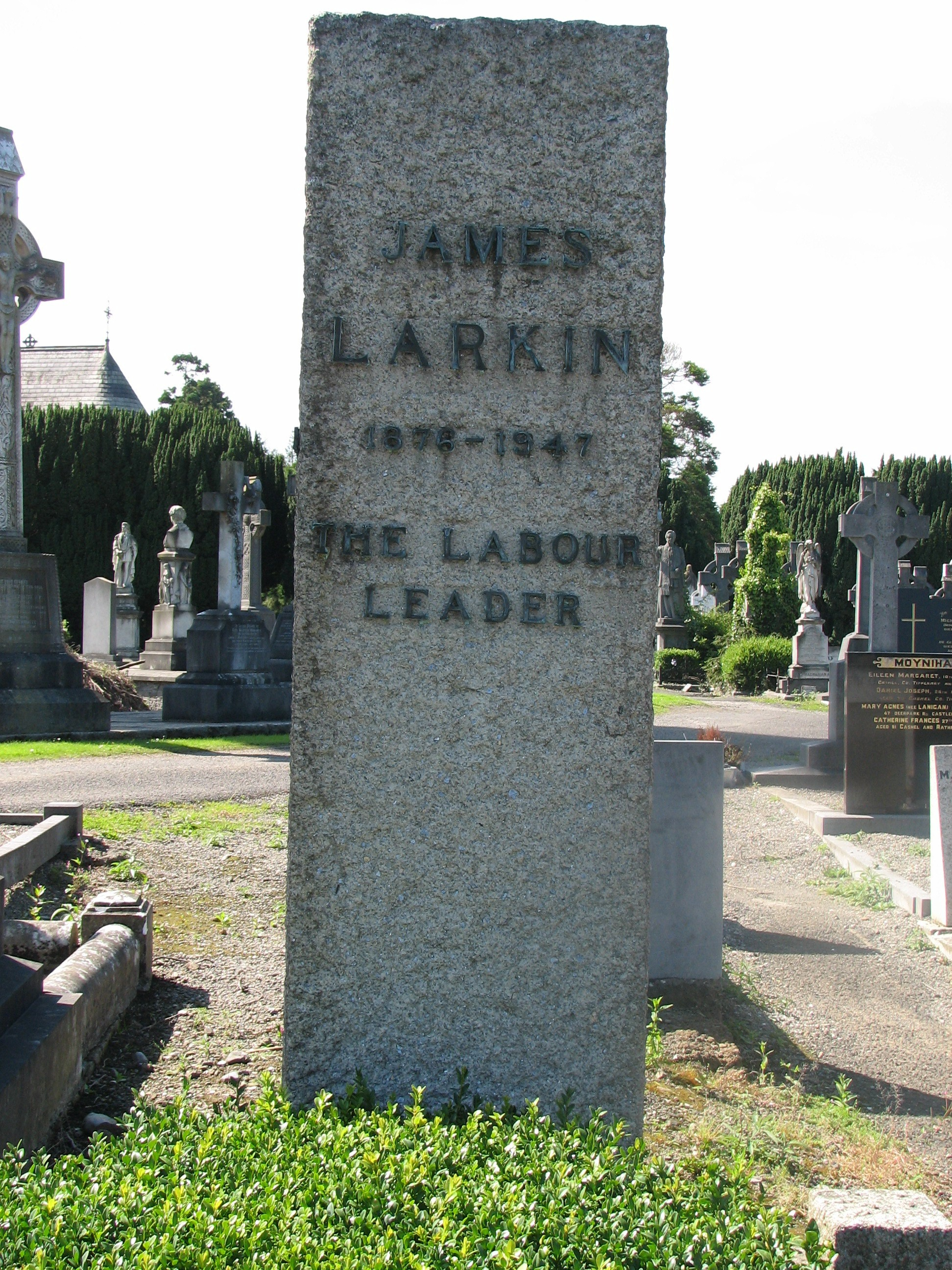
Larkin's gravestone in Glasnevin Cemetery

In late 1946, Larkin fell through a floor whilst supervising repairs to the Worker's Union of Ireland's Thomas Ashe Hall in Dublin. He suffered serious internal injuries and was rushed to hospital. He survived the accident but he never recovered from his injuries and died in his sleep in the Meath Hospital on 30 January 1947. Fr Aloysius Travers, OFM (who had administered last rites to James Connolly in 1916) also administered extreme unction to Larkin. His funeral mass was celebrated by the Catholic Archbishop of Dublin, John Charles McQuaid, who had visited him in the hospital before he died, and thousands lined the streets of the city as the hearse passed through on the way to Glasnevin Cemetery, escorted by the Irish Citizen Army in its last public appearance.

== Religion and personal life ==
Larkin is said to have been a Christian socialist. Larkin remained a Catholic throughout his life, and asserted there was no inherent conflict between his religious views and his politics:

There is no antagonism between the Cross and socialism! A man can pray to Jesus the Carpenter, and be a better socialist for it. Rightly understood, there is no conflict between the vision of Marx and the vision of Christ. I stand by the Cross and I stand by Karl Marx. Both Capital and the Bible are to me Holy Books.

— Larkin speaking at the New Star Casino, New York City on 17 Jan 1915.

Larkin was married to Elizabeth Brown, with whom he had four sons; James Larkin Jnr, Denis Larkin, Fintan Larkin and Bernard Larkin. Two of whom (James Jnr and Denis) followed their father into socialist politics and trade unionism, serving in political parties and unions established by their father and serving terms in Dáil Éireann. James Larkin Jnr represented both Dublin South and Dublin South-Central, and Denis Larkin represented one of his fathers' previous constituencies Dublin North-East and also later served a term as Lord Mayor of Dublin from 1955 to 1956. Larkin's sister Delia Larkin was also a prominent trade unionist and a founder of the Irish Women Workers' Union. Larkin separated from his wife Elizabeth, and did not live with her again following his return from America, although her death in 1945 is said to have affected him a great deal.

=== Allegations of antisemitism ===
Allegations of antisemitism have been levelled at Larkin, and he has been accused of running antisemitic verses in the Irish Worker paper. One told of a "Jewess" (female Jew) who was demanding back the price of her pushy son's theatre ticket when, rushing to get the best seat in the house, he fell to his death from a balcony. He soon republished the same caricature. Larkin ran a cartoon aimed at a particular group of Jewish immigrants which were described as "foreigners masquerading under Irish names". The cartoon used stereotypical physical characteristics, as well as mock-immigrant pronunciation and ikey, said to be regarded as a derogatory nickname for Jews. Larkin's The Jew's Shilling has been provided as another example by Colum Kenny.

== Commemorations ==
=== Literature ===
Larkin has been the subject of poems by Brendan Behan, Patrick Kavanagh, Frank O'Connor, Donagh MacDonagh and Lola Ridge; his character has been central in plays by Daniel Corkery, George Russell (Æ), and Seán O'Casey; and he is a heroic figure in the background of James Plunkett's novel Strumpet City and Lyn Andrews' Where the Mersey Flows. Strumpet City was later developed into a television mini-series of the same name, in which Larkin was portrayed by British-Irish actor Peter O'Toole.

=== Songs ===
James Larkin was memorialised by the New York Irish rock band Black 47, in their song "The Day They Set Jim Larkin Free". Donagh MacDonagh's "The Ballad of James Larkin" was recorded by Christy Moore, The Dubliners and The Buskers. Paddy Reilly sings a song simply entitled "Jim Larkin" that describes the lot of the workers and their appreciation of the changes made by Larkin and Connolly. The song "The Lockout" by Joe O'Sullivan describes Larkin's organisation of workers which led to the Dublin Lockout of 1913.

=== Monuments ===
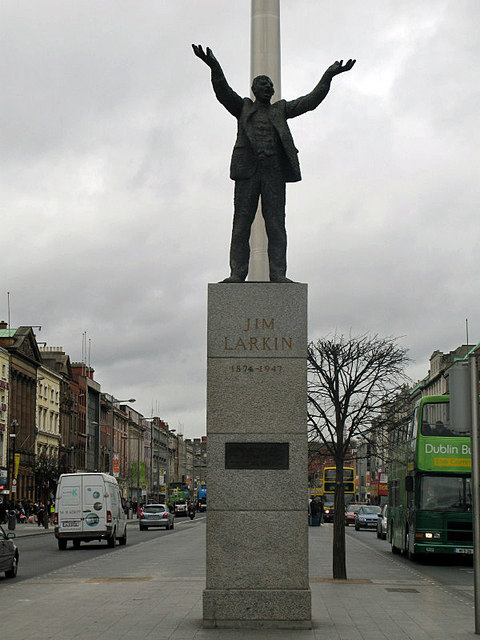
Statue of James Larkin on O'Connell Street, Dublin (Oisín Kelly 1977)

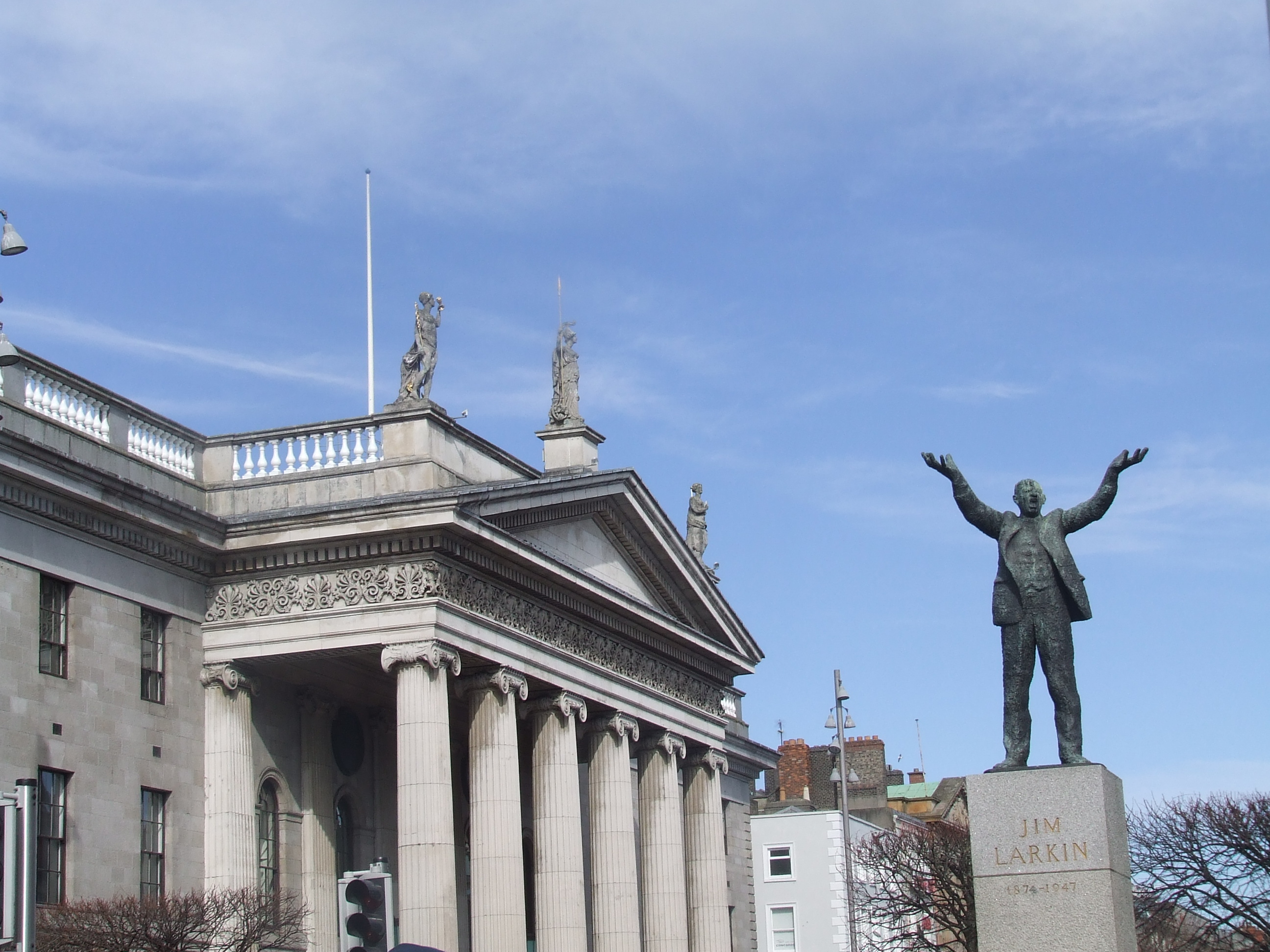
Statue of James Larkin with the GPO on left. Easter 2016

Today a statue of "Big Jim" stands on O'Connell Street in Dublin. Completed by Oisín Kelly, and unveiled in 1979, the inscription on the front of the monument is an extract in French, Irish and English from one of his famous speeches:

Les grands ne sont grands que parce que nous sommes à genoux: Levons-nous.
Ní uasal aon uasal ach sinne bheith íseal: Éirímis.

The great appear great because we are on our knees: Let us rise.

The slogan, first used on the 18th-century French radical paper Révolutions de Paris, also appeared on the masthead of the Workers' Republic, founded by James Connolly in Dublin in August 1898. Originally the organ of the Irish Socialist Republican Party, this periodical later became the official organ of the Communist Party of Ireland, which was founded in 1921. The original slogan is usually attributed to Camille Desmoulins (1760–1794), the French revolutionary; but it appears, only slightly modified, in an essay written by Étienne de La Boétie (1530–1563) and first published in 1576.

On the west side of the base of the Larkin monument is a quotation from the poem Jim Larkin by Patrick Kavanagh:

And Tyranny trampled them in Dublin's gutter
Until Jim Larkin came along and cried
The call of Freedom and the call of Pride
And Slavery crept to its hands and knees
And Nineteen Thirteen cheered from out the utter
Degradation of their miseries.

On the east side of the monument, there is a quotation from Drums under the Windows by Seán O'Casey:

... He talked to the workers, spoke as only Jim Larkin could speak, not for an assignation with peace, dark obedience, or placid resignation, but trumpet-tongued of resistance to wrong, discontent with leering poverty, and defiance of any power strutting out to stand in the way of their march onward.

A life-sized statue of Larkin is located in Donegall Street Place, Belfast.

=== Roads and buildings ===
A coastal road in Raheny, north Dublin, is named after him. A road in L4 1YQ, Kirkdale, in his home city of Liverpool, just off Scotland Road, is called James Larkin Way. James Larkin House, flats in the North Strand of Dublin takes his name.

=== Liverpool Irish Festival 2008 ===
To celebrate Liverpool's year as European Capital of Culture, the Liverpool Irish Festival held a James Larkin Evening at the 'Casa' bar — the dockers' pub in central Liverpool. This was attended by Francis Devine who wrote the general history of the trade union movement in Dublin and the formation of SIPTU. It was introduced by Liverpool Irishman Marcus Maher, who travelled from Dublin to present a specially commissioned painting by Finbar Coyle to James Larkin's last remaining Liverpool nephew, Tom Larkin. The painting reflects on one side Dublin and on the other side the Liver Bird and his home city of Liverpool.

=== People ===
The Transport and General Workers' Union activist Jack Jones, whose full name was James Larkin Jones, was named in honour of his fellow Liverpudlian.

== Portrayals ==
- Liam Cunningham (2012) - Titanic: Blood and Steel; TV series/5 episodes/Episodes 1-4 & 12

== See also ==
- Families in the Oireachtas

Trade union offices
New office	General Secretary of the Irish Transport and General Workers' Union; 1909–1923	Succeeded by William O'Brien
Preceded by William O'Brien	President of the Irish Trades Union Congress; 1914	Succeeded by Thomas Johnson
New office	General Secretary of the Workers' Union of Ireland; 1923–1947	Succeeded by James Larkin Jnr
Preceded by Archie Jackson	President of the Dublin Council of Trade Unions; 1944–1945	Succeeded by John Swift

Dáil	Election	Deputy (Party)	Deputy (Party)	Deputy (Party)	Deputy (Party)	Deputy (Party)	Deputy (Party)	Deputy (Party)	Deputy (Party)
4th	1923	Alfie Byrne (Ind.)	Francis Cahill (CnaG)	Margaret Collins-O'Driscoll (CnaG)	Seán McGarry (CnaG)	William Hewat (BP)	Richard Mulcahy (CnaG)	Seán T. O'Kelly (Rep)	Ernie O'Malley (Rep)
4th	1925 by-election	Alfie Byrne (Ind.)	Patrick Leonard (CnaG)	Margaret Collins-O'Driscoll (CnaG)	Oscar Traynor (Rep)	William Hewat (BP)	Richard Mulcahy (CnaG)	Seán T. O'Kelly (Rep)	Ernie O'Malley (Rep)
5th	1927 (Jun)	Alfie Byrne (Ind.)	John Byrne (CnaG)	Margaret Collins-O'Driscoll (CnaG)	Oscar Traynor (SF)	Denis Cullen (Lab)	Richard Mulcahy (CnaG)	Seán T. O'Kelly (FF)	Kathleen Clarke (FF)
6th	1927 (Sep)	Alfie Byrne (Ind.)	John Byrne (CnaG)	Margaret Collins-O'Driscoll (CnaG)	Patrick Leonard (CnaG)	James Larkin (IWL)	Richard Mulcahy (CnaG)	Seán T. O'Kelly (FF)	Eamonn Cooney (FF)
6th	1928 by-election	Alfie Byrne (Ind.)	John Byrne (CnaG)	Margaret Collins-O'Driscoll (CnaG)	Patrick Leonard (CnaG)	Vincent Rice (CnaG)	Richard Mulcahy (CnaG)	Seán T. O'Kelly (FF)	Eamonn Cooney (FF)
6th	1929 by-election	Thomas F. O'Higgins (CnaG)	John Byrne (CnaG)	Margaret Collins-O'Driscoll (CnaG)	Patrick Leonard (CnaG)	Vincent Rice (CnaG)	Richard Mulcahy (CnaG)	Seán T. O'Kelly (FF)	Eamonn Cooney (FF)
7th	1932	Alfie Byrne (Ind.)	John Byrne (CnaG)	Margaret Collins-O'Driscoll (CnaG)	Oscar Traynor (FF)	Cormac Breathnach (FF)	Richard Mulcahy (CnaG)	Seán T. O'Kelly (FF)	Eamonn Cooney (FF)
8th	1933	Alfie Byrne (Ind.)	Patrick Belton (CnaG)	Vincent Rice (CnaG)	Oscar Traynor (FF)	Cormac Breathnach (FF)	Richard Mulcahy (CnaG)	Seán T. O'Kelly (FF)	Eamonn Cooney (FF)
9th	1937	Constituency abolished. See Dublin North-East and Dublin North-West							

Dáil	Election	Deputy (Party)	Deputy (Party)	Deputy (Party)	Deputy (Party)
22nd	1981	Ray Burke (FF)	John Boland (FG)	Nora Owen (FG)	3 seats 1981–1992
23rd	1982 (Feb)	Ray Burke (FF)	John Boland (FG)	Nora Owen (FG)	3 seats 1981–1992
24th	1982 (Nov)	Ray Burke (FF)	John Boland (FG)	Nora Owen (FG)	3 seats 1981–1992
25th	1987	Ray Burke (FF)	John Boland (FG)	G. V. Wright (FF)	3 seats 1981–1992
26th	1989	Ray Burke (FF)	Nora Owen (FG)	Seán Ryan (Lab)	3 seats 1981–1992
27th	1992	Ray Burke (FF)	Nora Owen (FG)	Seán Ryan (Lab)	Trevor Sargent (GP)
28th	1997	Ray Burke (FF)	Nora Owen (FG)	G. V. Wright (FF)	Trevor Sargent (GP)
28th	1998 by-election	Seán Ryan (Lab)	Nora Owen (FG)	G. V. Wright (FF)	Trevor Sargent (GP)
29th	2002	Seán Ryan (Lab)	Jim Glennon (FF)	G. V. Wright (FF)	Trevor Sargent (GP)
30th	2007	James Reilly (FG)	Michael Kennedy (FF)	Darragh O'Brien (FF)	Trevor Sargent (GP)
31st	2011	James Reilly (FG)	Alan Farrell (FG)	Brendan Ryan (Lab)	Clare Daly (SP)
32nd	2016	Constituency abolished. See Dublin Fingal			

Dáil	Election	Deputy (Party)	Deputy (Party)	Deputy (Party)	Deputy (Party)	Deputy (Party)
9th	1937	Alfie Byrne (Ind.)	Oscar Traynor (FF)	James Larkin (Ind.)	3 seats 1937–1948	
10th	1938	Alfie Byrne (Ind.)	Oscar Traynor (FF)	Richard Mulcahy (FG)	3 seats 1937–1948	
11th	1943	Alfie Byrne (Ind.)	Oscar Traynor (FF)	James Larkin (Lab)	3 seats 1937–1948	
12th	1944	Alfie Byrne (Ind.)	Oscar Traynor (FF)	Harry Colley (FF)	3 seats 1937–1948	
13th	1948	Alfie Byrne (Ind.)	Oscar Traynor (FF)	Harry Colley (FF)	Jack Belton (FG)	Peadar Cowan (CnaP)
14th	1951	Alfie Byrne (Ind.)	Oscar Traynor (FF)	Harry Colley (FF)	Jack Belton (FG)	Peadar Cowan (Ind.)
15th	1954	Alfie Byrne (Ind.)	Oscar Traynor (FF)	Harry Colley (FF)	Jack Belton (FG)	Denis Larkin (Lab)
15th	1956 by-election	Patrick Byrne (FG)	Oscar Traynor (FF)	Harry Colley (FF)	Jack Belton (FG)	Denis Larkin (Lab)
16th	1957	Patrick Byrne (FG)	Oscar Traynor (FF)	Charles Haughey (FF)	Jack Belton (FG)	Denis Larkin (Lab)
17th	1961	Patrick Byrne (FG)	George Colley (FF)	Charles Haughey (FF)	Jack Belton (FG)	Eugene Timmons (FF)
17th	1963 by-election	Patrick Byrne (FG)	George Colley (FF)	Charles Haughey (FF)	Paddy Belton (FG)	Eugene Timmons (FF)
18th	1965	Patrick Byrne (FG)	George Colley (FF)	Charles Haughey (FF)	Paddy Belton (FG)	Denis Larkin (Lab)
19th	1969	Conor Cruise O'Brien (Lab)	Eugene Timmons (FF)	Charles Haughey (FF)	Paddy Belton (FG)	4 seats 1969–1977
20th	1973	Conor Cruise O'Brien (Lab)	Eugene Timmons (FF)	Charles Haughey (FF)	Paddy Belton (FG)	4 seats 1969–1977
21st	1977	Constituency abolished				

Dáil	Election	Deputy (Party)	Deputy (Party)	Deputy (Party)	Deputy (Party)
22nd	1981	Michael Woods (FF)	Liam Fitzgerald (FF)	Seán Dublin Bay Rockall Loftus (Ind.)	Michael Joe Cosgrave (FG)
23rd	1982 (Feb)	Michael Woods (FF)	Maurice Manning (FG)	Ned Brennan (FF)	Michael Joe Cosgrave (FG)
24th	1982 (Nov)	Michael Woods (FF)	Maurice Manning (FG)	Liam Fitzgerald (FF)	Michael Joe Cosgrave (FG)
25th	1987	Michael Woods (FF)	Pat McCartan (WP)	Liam Fitzgerald (FF)	Michael Joe Cosgrave (FG)
26th	1989	Michael Woods (FF)	Pat McCartan (WP)	Liam Fitzgerald (FF)	Michael Joe Cosgrave (FG)
27th	1992	Michael Woods (FF)	Tommy Broughan (Lab)	Liam Fitzgerald (FF)	Seán Kenny (Lab)
28th	1997	Michael Woods (FF)	Tommy Broughan (Lab)	Martin Brady (FF)	Michael Joe Cosgrave (FG)
29th	2002	Michael Woods (FF)	Tommy Broughan (Lab)	Martin Brady (FF)	3 seats from 2002
30th	2007	Michael Woods (FF)	Tommy Broughan (Lab)	Terence Flanagan (FG)	3 seats from 2002
31st	2011	Seán Kenny (Lab)	Tommy Broughan (Lab)	Terence Flanagan (FG)	3 seats from 2002
32nd	2016	Constituency abolished. See Dublin Bay North			
