= Norman Kennedy (politician) =

Irish trade unionist and politician

Norman Kennedy (died 1983) was a trade unionist and politician in northern Ireland.

Kennedy worked in a Belfast linen factory for 20 years. He was a prominent member of the Amalgamated Transport and General Workers' Union. He served as President of the Irish Trades Union Congress in 1957. He worked closely with James Larkin, Jr and John Conroy to complete its reunification with the Congress of Irish Unions, and became President of the united organisation, the Irish Congress of Trade Unions, in 1961. He also served on the Northern Ireland Economic Council.

Kennedy served as a Northern Ireland Labour Party member of the Senate of Northern Ireland from 1965 until its proguation in 1972. From 1970 to 1971, he served as a Deputy Speaker. He then withdrew from politics and trade unionism, and led the consortium which established Downtown Radio, Northern Ireland's first commercial radio station.

Trade union offices
Preceded by Sam Kyle	Irish Secretary of the Amalgamated Transport and General Workers' Union; 1949–1974	Succeeded by John Freeman
Preceded by J. Harold Binks	President of the Irish Trades Union Congress; 1957	Succeeded by Jack Macgougan
Preceded by James Larkin Jnr	President of the Irish Congress of Trade Unions; 1961	Succeeded by W. J. Fitzpatrick
