= Medical Laboratory Scientists' Association =

Irish trade union

The Medical Laboratory Scientists' Association (MLSA) is a trade union representing laboratory technicians in the Republic of Ireland.

The union was founded as the Medical Laboratory Technologists' Association. In 1961, it affiliated to the Workers' Union of Ireland, but maintained a separate identity, and by 1971 had grown to 420 members. The Workers' Union became part of SIPTU, and the union maintained its affiliation, but in 2001 registered as an independent trade union.
