= Denis Larkin =

Irish politician (1908–1987)

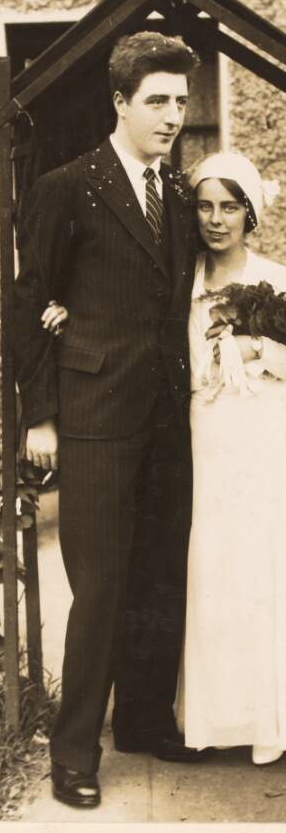
- Larkin's wedding in 1931

Teachta Dála
- In office April 1965 – June 1969
- In office May 1954 – October 1961
- Constituency: Dublin North-East

Lord Mayor of Dublin
- In office 1955–1956
- Preceded by: Alfie Byrne
- Succeeded by: Robert Briscoe

Personal details
- Born: 8 June 1908 Rostrevor, County Down, Ireland
- Died: 2 July 1987 (aged 79) Dublin, Ireland
- Party: Labour Party
- Spouse: Anne Moore
- Children: 2
- Parent: James Larkin (father)
- Relatives: James Larkin Jnr (brother)
- Education: St. Enda's School

Denis Larkin (8 June 1908 – 2 July 1987) was an Irish Labour Party politician and trade union official.

== Early life ==
He was born 8 June 1908 in Rostrevor, County Down, the second of four sons of the Irish trade unionist James Larkin and Elizabeth Larkin (née Brown), the daughter of a lay Baptist preacher from County Down. After the family moved to Dublin in 1909, Denis, along with his brother James Jnr attended St. Enda's School, in Rathfarnham, County Dublin, which he found austere, but given his father's reputation, it was the only school that would accept them.

== Trade union activity ==
After leaving school, he worked in a variety of jobs, including the London Across Trading Concern. In 1928 he became an official with the Workers' Union of Ireland (WUI) (founded by his father in 1924), and had to contend with a multitude of strikes in the coal, gas, building and victualling industries. As the WUI expanded during the 1940s, he became involved in many hearings and presentations at the Labour Court, and in 1949 became district branch secretary of the union and an executive member of the Irish Trades Union Congress (ITUC), working closely with his brother James, then general secretary of the WUI, although he did not share his brother's communist sympathies.

When James died in 1969, Denis became general secretary of the WUI, and presided over a period of expansion of the union. He served as vice-president of the Irish Congress of Trade Unions from 1973 to 1974, and as president from 1974 to 1975.

== Politics ==
He was active in the political side of the labour movement, he was a member of the Labour party's administrative executive from 1931. He was an unsuccessful candidate 1951 general election, but was elected to Dáil Éireann as a Labour Party Teachta Dála (TD) for the Dublin North-East constituency at the 1954 general election and was re-elected at the 1957 general election. He lost his seat at the 1961 general election but was re-elected at the 1965 general election. He did not contest the 1969 general election.

A member of Dublin Corporation for thirty years, he was chairman of the housing committee of the corporation where he sought a solution to Dublin's housing crisis. He served as Lord Mayor of Dublin from 1955 to 1956.

== Later life ==
He retired as the general secretary of the WUI in April 1977, enabling him to pursue his love of photography. He died 2 July 1987 in Dublin, some years after the death of his wife Anne Moore, a native of Dublin and fellow party activist who had been his agent on election campaigns. They had two children.

== See also ==
- Families in the Oireachtas

Civic offices
Preceded by Alfie Byrne	Lord Mayor of Dublin; 1955–1956	Succeeded by Robert Briscoe
Trade union offices
Preceded by James Larkin Jnr	General Secretary of the Workers' Union of Ireland; 1969–1977	Succeeded by Paddy Cardiff
Preceded by Stephen McGonagle	President of the Irish Congress of Trade Unions; 1974–1975	Succeeded by Andy Barr

Dáil	Election	Deputy (Party)	Deputy (Party)	Deputy (Party)	Deputy (Party)	Deputy (Party)
9th	1937	Alfie Byrne (Ind.)	Oscar Traynor (FF)	James Larkin (Ind.)	3 seats 1937–1948	
10th	1938	Alfie Byrne (Ind.)	Oscar Traynor (FF)	Richard Mulcahy (FG)	3 seats 1937–1948	
11th	1943	Alfie Byrne (Ind.)	Oscar Traynor (FF)	James Larkin (Lab)	3 seats 1937–1948	
12th	1944	Alfie Byrne (Ind.)	Oscar Traynor (FF)	Harry Colley (FF)	3 seats 1937–1948	
13th	1948	Alfie Byrne (Ind.)	Oscar Traynor (FF)	Harry Colley (FF)	Jack Belton (FG)	Peadar Cowan (CnaP)
14th	1951	Alfie Byrne (Ind.)	Oscar Traynor (FF)	Harry Colley (FF)	Jack Belton (FG)	Peadar Cowan (Ind.)
15th	1954	Alfie Byrne (Ind.)	Oscar Traynor (FF)	Harry Colley (FF)	Jack Belton (FG)	Denis Larkin (Lab)
15th	1956 by-election	Patrick Byrne (FG)	Oscar Traynor (FF)	Harry Colley (FF)	Jack Belton (FG)	Denis Larkin (Lab)
16th	1957	Patrick Byrne (FG)	Oscar Traynor (FF)	Charles Haughey (FF)	Jack Belton (FG)	Denis Larkin (Lab)
17th	1961	Patrick Byrne (FG)	George Colley (FF)	Charles Haughey (FF)	Jack Belton (FG)	Eugene Timmons (FF)
17th	1963 by-election	Patrick Byrne (FG)	George Colley (FF)	Charles Haughey (FF)	Paddy Belton (FG)	Eugene Timmons (FF)
18th	1965	Patrick Byrne (FG)	George Colley (FF)	Charles Haughey (FF)	Paddy Belton (FG)	Denis Larkin (Lab)
19th	1969	Conor Cruise O'Brien (Lab)	Eugene Timmons (FF)	Charles Haughey (FF)	Paddy Belton (FG)	4 seats 1969–1977
20th	1973	Conor Cruise O'Brien (Lab)	Eugene Timmons (FF)	Charles Haughey (FF)	Paddy Belton (FG)	4 seats 1969–1977
21st	1977	Constituency abolished				

Dáil	Election	Deputy (Party)	Deputy (Party)	Deputy (Party)	Deputy (Party)
22nd	1981	Michael Woods (FF)	Liam Fitzgerald (FF)	Seán Dublin Bay Rockall Loftus (Ind.)	Michael Joe Cosgrave (FG)
23rd	1982 (Feb)	Michael Woods (FF)	Maurice Manning (FG)	Ned Brennan (FF)	Michael Joe Cosgrave (FG)
24th	1982 (Nov)	Michael Woods (FF)	Maurice Manning (FG)	Liam Fitzgerald (FF)	Michael Joe Cosgrave (FG)
25th	1987	Michael Woods (FF)	Pat McCartan (WP)	Liam Fitzgerald (FF)	Michael Joe Cosgrave (FG)
26th	1989	Michael Woods (FF)	Pat McCartan (WP)	Liam Fitzgerald (FF)	Michael Joe Cosgrave (FG)
27th	1992	Michael Woods (FF)	Tommy Broughan (Lab)	Liam Fitzgerald (FF)	Seán Kenny (Lab)
28th	1997	Michael Woods (FF)	Tommy Broughan (Lab)	Martin Brady (FF)	Michael Joe Cosgrave (FG)
29th	2002	Michael Woods (FF)	Tommy Broughan (Lab)	Martin Brady (FF)	3 seats from 2002
30th	2007	Michael Woods (FF)	Tommy Broughan (Lab)	Terence Flanagan (FG)	3 seats from 2002
31st	2011	Seán Kenny (Lab)	Tommy Broughan (Lab)	Terence Flanagan (FG)	3 seats from 2002
32nd	2016	Constituency abolished. See Dublin Bay North			
