= Irish Worker League =

Defunct political party in Ireland

- Leader: Jim Larkin
- Founded: September 1923
- Preceded by: Socialist Party of Ireland
- Succeeded by: Revolutionary Workers' Groups
- Headquarters: Marlborough Street, Dublin
- Newspaper: The Irish Worker
- Ideology: Communism
- Political position: Far-left
- International affiliation: Communist International

The Irish Worker League was an Irish communist party, established in September 1923 by Jim Larkin, following his return to Ireland. Larkin re-established the newspaper The Irish Worker. The Irish Worker League (IWL) superseded the Revolutionary Workers' Groups circa 1930.

== Background ==
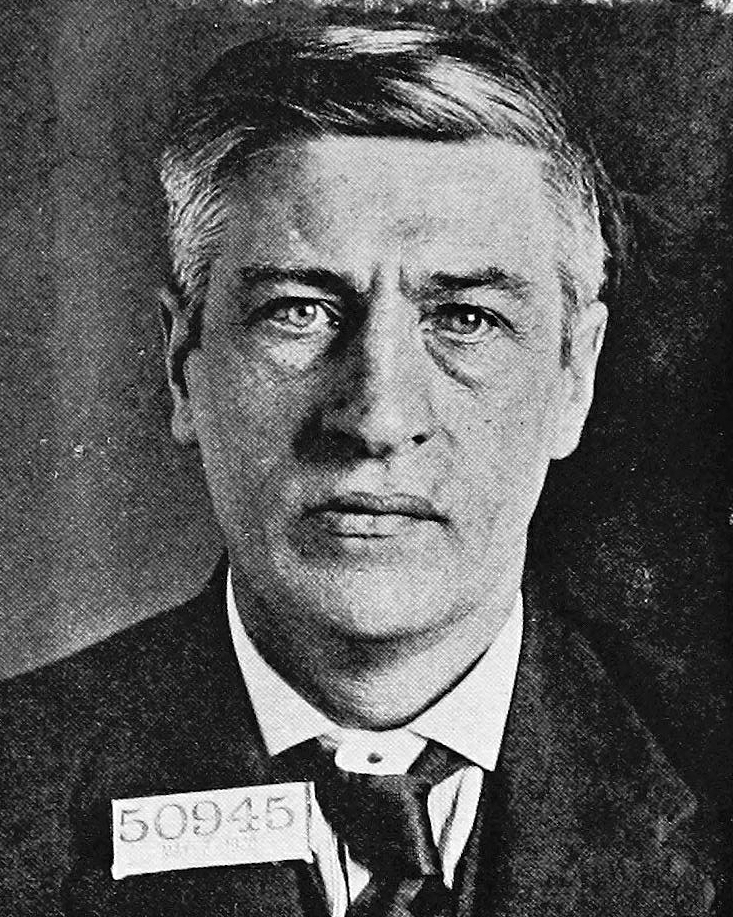
Jim Larkin, whom the organisation gravitated around

In July 1924 Larkin attended the Fifth Comintern Congress, held in Moscow, and was elected to its executive committee. Initially, the League was not organised as a political party and had no founding congress. Its most prominent activity in its first year was to raise funds for republican civil war prisoners.

== Relationship with the Comintern ==
The Comintern was involved with the rise of the IWL as the Comintern used its influence to dissolve the first CPI and raise up Larkin and the IWL as the leadership of the Irish communist movement. The Comintern had strong ties with Larkin leading up to the creation of the IWL since he had led the Worker's Union of Ireland, a labor group that was a member of the Profintern.

In July 1924 Larkin attended the Fifth Comintern Congress, held in Moscow, and was elected to its executive committee. Initially, the League was not organised as a political party and had no founding congress. Its most prominent activity in its first year was to raise funds for republican civil war prisoners.

The IWL managed to enrol a number of its members in the Lenin School in Moscow. In September 1927, the IWL held a conference at which it passed a political programme.

In November 1926, Larkin attended a general assembly with the executive committee of the Communist International (ECCI) where he not only assured Moscow that the IWL would be what they viewed as a more proper party, but also boasted his successes as a labour leader. At this time Larkin also dealt with the Profintern given the IWL's attachment to Irish labour unions. It was after this when the Comintern would reaffirm its support of the IWL over the Workers' Party of Ireland (WPI) despite not being successful politically up to that point.

Larkin broke ties with the Soviet Union following the opening of a Russian Oil Products depot in Dublin, and cutting him out of the profits. After breaking ties, Larkin pushed his son, James Larkin Jr. (Young Jim) to take over on relations with the Comintern for the IWL. Larkin also requested that the leadership in Moscow provide "undivided support" to the movement in Ireland on the further stipulation that he would not interfere or influence his son in any way.

== Political activity ==
Its sole electoral success was Larkin's election as TD for the Dublin North constituency in the September 1927 general election. However, as a result of a libel award against him won by William O'Brien, which he had refused to pay, he was declared bankrupt and disqualified from taking up his seat.

The party's headquarters was located at Marlborough Street in Dublin.

Largely inactive since 1928, Larkin revived the IWL for his election campaigns in 1932 and 1933, in 1933 he succeeded in getting elected to the re-established Dublin City Council.

== Dissolution ==
The party never had any real foothold as a political movement until its one success in the 1927 general election, with rivals in the WPI referring to it as a "corpse" already in 1926. The communist movement was considered to have been sent back by the loss of organization from the rise of the IWL. This was later coupled with the publication of The Irish Worker ceasing in 1925 which was the IWL's only journalistic means, which only served to weaken the party's potential for spreading information to the masses. Furthermore, the party lost Comintern support as James Larkin Jr. would launch the Revolutionary Worker's Group (RWG) in November 1931, and as Moscow officials realized that there was no IWL support without Jim Larkin.

== General election results ==
Election	Seats won	±	Position	First Pref votes	%	Government	Leader
1927 (Sep)	1 / 153	▲1	▲6th	12,473	1.1%	Opposition	James Larkin
1932	0 / 153	▼1	None	3,860	0.3%	No Seats	James Larkin
