= Stephen McGonagle =

Northern Irish politician and trade unionist (1914–2002)

Senator
- In office 23 February 1983 – 25 April 1987
- Constituency: Nominated by the Taoiseach

Personal details
- Born: 17 November 1914 Derry, Ireland
- Died: 4 March 2002 (aged 87) Derry, Northern Ireland
- Party: Labour Party; Northern Ireland Labour Party
- Spouse: Greta McGonagle
- Children: 6

Stephen McGonagle (17 November 1914 – 4 March 2002) was a Northern Irish and Irish trade unionist.

Born in Derry, Ireland, McGonagle worked as a plumber. He joined the Derry Labour Party, a small anti-partitionist grouping, but resigned in 1946 in protest at its alliance with the Nationalist Party, instead joining the Northern Ireland Labour Party. However, this party became increasingly unionist in outlook, so in 1949 he resigned to join the Irish Labour Party. Active in the National Union of Tailors and Garment Workers, and became secretary of its Derry branch in 1949. In 1952, he persuaded the majority of its members - around 4,000 mostly female workers - to break away and form the Clothing Workers' Union, which soon merged with the Irish Transport and General Workers' Union, and in 1954 McGonagle became secretary of its Derry branch.

McGonagle stood as an independent Labour candidate in Foyle at the 1958 and 1962 Northern Ireland general elections.

He took approximately 40% of the vote and second place on each occasion, behind Eddie McAteer. He stood on a platform advocating the reunification of Ireland, the ending of religious discrimination, and action on social issues.

In 1968, McGonagle was the chairman of the Northern Ireland Committee of the Irish Congress of Trade Unions (ICTU). Later in the year, following civil unrest in Derry, he was appointed vice-chairman of a new Development Commission, which replaced the city's local government. He resigned in 1971, along with the other Roman Catholic members of the commission, following the introduction of internment without trial. Following the 1972 death of Jim Cox, President of the ICTU, McGonagle took up the post, and he was re-elected to serve in 1973.

In 1974, he took up a post as Northern Ireland Parliamentary Commissioner for Administration and Complaints, serving for five years, while in 1977 he became chairman of the Northern Ireland Police Complaints Board. He also chaired the 1982 inquiry into the Kincora Boys' Home scandal. In 1983, he was appointed to the Seanad Éireann, and facing opposition from unionists, resigned all his public posts in Northern Ireland. While an independent member of the Seanad, he participated in the New Ireland Forum as part of the Irish Labour Party team.

McGonagle's grandson, Owen Reidy, later also became a prominent trade unionist, as general secretary of the ICTU.

He died on 4 March 2002, aged 87.

Trade union offices
Preceded by Jim Cox	President of the Irish Congress of Trade Unions; 1972–1973	Succeeded by Denis Larkin
