= Prison Officers' Association (Ireland) =

Trade union for prison officers in Ireland

- Founded: 1947
- Headquarters: 18 Merrion Square, Dublin
- Location: Ireland
- Key people: John Clinton (General Secretary)
- Publication: Prison Officer Magazine
- Affiliations: Irish Congress of Trade Unions
- Website: www.poa.ie

The Prison Officers' Association (POA) is a trade union representing prison officers in Ireland.

The union was founded in 1947 by prison officers working at Mountjoy Prison in Dublin. Although it gradually established branches at other prisons, progress was slow, and the Mountjoy branch committee continued to run the union's national operation. Only in 1972 was a representative National Executive Council established, with members from each branch. The following year, the first full-time general secretary was elected, Jim Wardick.

In 1974, the POA launched its first industrial action, at St Patrick's Institution. It joined the Irish Congress of Trade Unions in 1981, and undertook its first national strike in 1988, following a dispute over attendance requirements.
