= John Freeman (trade unionist) =

John Adair Freeman (24 November 1933 – 15 March 2011) was a trade unionist from Northern Ireland.

Born on the lower Oldpark road in north Belfast, Freeman was raised a Presbyterian. His father Samuel fought in the 2nd World war with the Scottish Cameronian rifles and was shot and captured in Belgium. He spent nearly five years in Poland as a prisoner of war. Samuel was a life long christian and member of all the loyal orders. Freeman had an older sister Stella and a younger brother Edward. They were educated at the Model Primary School on Cliftonville Road, leaving at the age of fourteen. During the war years his mother Mary worked in the local mill making munitions. He undertook a variety of jobs before emigrating to Australia in 1955, to work as a labourer. He returned to Belfast in 1962, and found himself unable to work at Short and Harland because he was not a member of the Amalgamated Transport and General Workers' Union (ATGWU). He instead found employment in a warehouse, but joined the ATGWU and soon moved to work at Short and Harland as a labourer. Freeman became an ATGWU shop steward, then won election as the convenor of shop stewards at the works. He also won election to the union's national general executive council.

Freeman opposed internment of suspected Irish republicans in 1971, and faced intimidation from the Loyalist Association of Workers. He was forced to leave his job, but the ATGWU found him full-time employment as a union organiser. He proved successful, and in 1974 was appointed as the union's regional secretary for Ireland. In the role, he aimed to avoid involvement in sectarian issues, and was involved in the creation of the Enkalon Foundation. He also represented the union at the Irish Congress of Trade Unions (ICTU), and from 1995 to 1997 served as President of the ICTU.

Freeman retired in 1998, and died in 2011. He was predeceased by his wife Ellen whom he was devoted to.

Trade union offices
Preceded by Norman Kennedy	Irish Secretary of the Amalgamated Transport and General Workers' Union; 1974–1998	Succeeded by Mick O'Reilly
Preceded by Phil Flynn	President of the Irish Congress of Trade Unions; 1995–1997	Succeeded by Edmund Browne
