= Owen Reidy =

Irish trade union leader

Owen Reidy (born 1972) is an Irish trade union leader, elected in 2022 as the general secretary, the chief officer, of the Irish Congress of Trade Unions.

== Life and education ==
Born in Dublin, Reidy is the grandson of the trade unionist Stephen McGonagle. Reidy's family moved to County Donegal in 1977, and he grew up in Raphoe, Dunfanaghy and Moville. He attended Carndonagh Community School, and then studied history and politics at University College Dublin.

== Career and achievements ==
After graduating, Reidy found work as an organiser for the SIPTU union, for various groups of private sector workers in the West of Ireland. In 2013, he became one of the union's five divisional organisers, covering the Transport, Energy, Aviation and Construction Division. In 2016, Reidy moved to become deputy general secretary of the Irish Congress of Trade Unions (ICTU), to which SIPTU is affiliated. In this role, he led the federation's response to Brexit and the cost of living crisis.

In 2022, Reidy was elected as general secretary of the ICTU. On election, he listed his priorities as strengthening collective bargaining, increasing membership of the trade union movement, and giving workers a greater voice in society and the economy.

Trade union offices
Preceded by Patricia King	General Secretary of the Irish Congress of Trade Unions; 2022–present	Succeeded by Incumbent
