= Financial Services Union =

- Founded: 1918; 108 years ago
- Headquarters: One Stephen Street Upper, Dublin
- Locations: Ireland; United Kingdom
- Members: ▼8,651 (2024)
- General Secretary: John O'Connell
- Affiliations: ICTU, ICPSA, UNI
- Website: fsunion.org

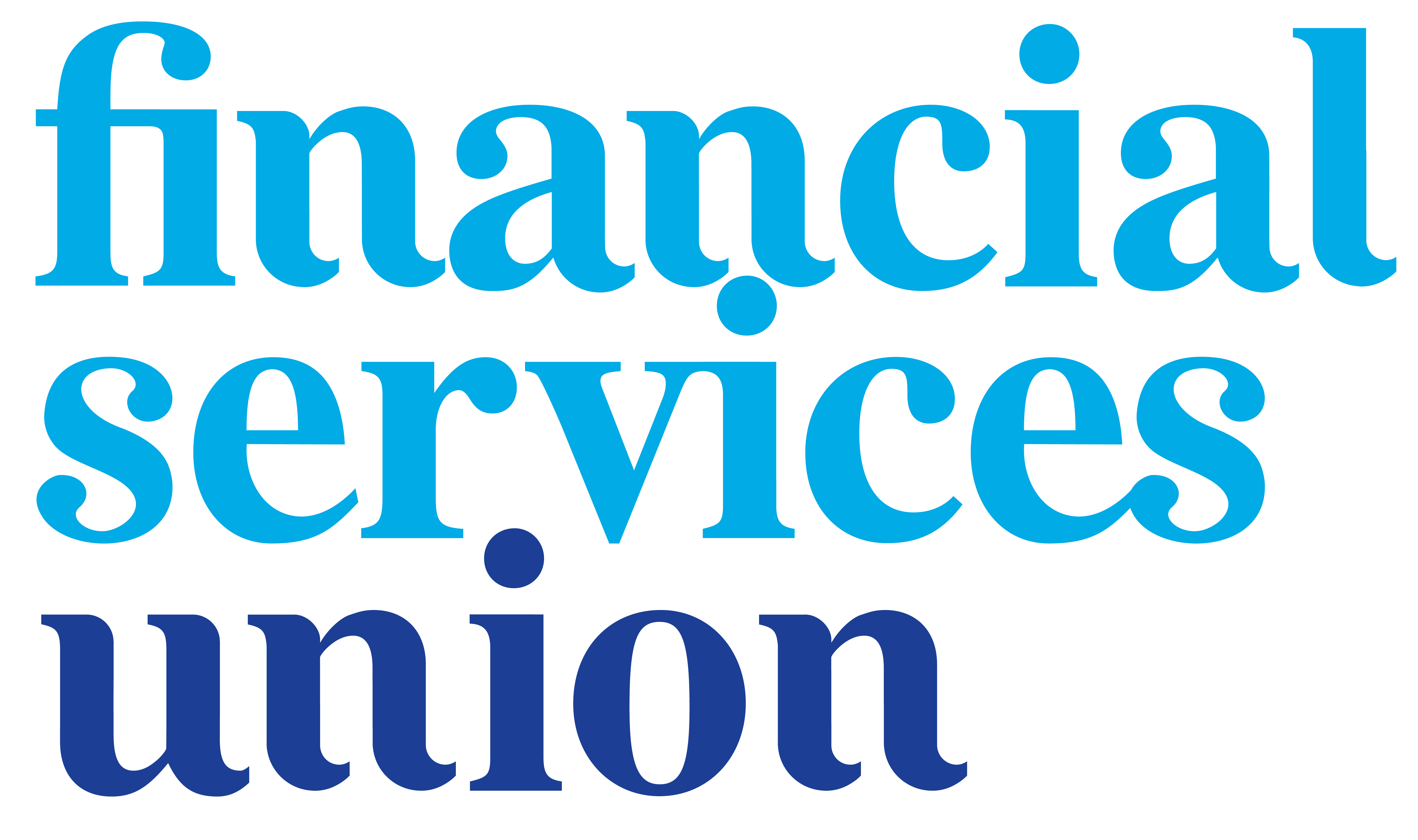

The Financial Services Union (FSU) is a trade union representing staff in the finance sector in the Republic of Ireland, Northern Ireland, and those employed by Irish financial institutions in Great Britain and overseas.

== History ==
The origins of the union lie in a meeting at the Glentworth Hotel in Limerick in 1917. This led to the formation of the Irish Bank Officials Association the following year at the Mansion House in Dublin. Always an all-Ireland organisation, since the 1960s, it has also represented employees of Irish banks in Britain.

In 1992, the union-led a major strike. Although this led to a short-term drop in membership, in the long-term the union believes it helped it secure better rights for its members and promoted membership growth.

The union was renamed as IBOA The Finance Union in 2007. Its membership reached a peak of 25,000 in 2008, but then fell to 15,000 during the 2008 financial crisis. It began admitting workers in non-banking companies which provide outsourced services to banks, and in recognition of this, became the Financial Services Union in 2016.

In 2018 Dermot Ryan succeeded Larry Broderick as General Secretary.

At its May 2018 conference, the Union marked the centenary of its foundation.

Sharon McAuley is the elected President of the Financial Services Union. Her term runs from 2018 to 2021.

Following the departure of Dermot Ryan, Gareth Murphy was appointed Acting General Secretary in October 2018.

== General Secretaries ==
1917: Charles Denroche
1932: John Donovan
1948: John Titterington
1973: Job Stott
1989: Ciaran Ryan
2000: Larry Broderick
2018: Dermot Ryan
2018: Gareth Murphy (acting)
2019: John O'Connell
