= Paddy Cardiff =

Paddy Cardiff (8 November 1925 – 3 June 2005) was an Irish trade unionist.

Born in Dublin, into a family heavily involved in trade unionism, Cardiff left school at 13 and joined the British Army near the end of World War II. He returned to Dublin in 1948, where he soon started work at Guinness, and became active in the Workers' Union of Ireland (WUI). He studied at the Catholic Workers College in Milltown. He was one of a group of trade unionists who secured recognition of the union by the company, and he rapidly rose through the union, working for it full-time from 1964. In 1969, he was elected as Deputy General Secretary of the WUI, in which role he led the union's campaign for Ireland to join the European Economic Community.

Cardiff was elected as General Secretary of the WUI in 1977, and led negotiations which several years after his 1982 retirement brought about a long-anticipated merger with the Irish Transport and General Workers' Union. He served as President of the Irish Congress of Trade Unions in 1983, then retired on account of ill health.

Trade union offices
Preceded by Denis Larkin	General Secretary of the Workers' Union of Ireland; 1977–1982	Succeeded by Bill Attley
Preceded by David Wylie	President of the Irish Congress of Trade Unions; 1983	Succeeded by James Graham
