= Patricia King =

Irish trade unionist

Patricia King is an Irish trade unionist.

Born in County Wicklow, King worked as a trade union organiser for many years before being appointed as the Dublin organiser of SIPTU (Services, Industrial, Professional and Technical Union) in 2004. In this role, she was centrally involved in a major dispute involving workers at Irish Ferries in 2006 and 2007.

In 2010, King was elected as vice-president of SIPTU, the most prominent post held by a woman in the union to that point. She also served on the RTÉ Authority, the National Roads Authority, the Dublin Airport Authority and the Apprenticeship Council. She was involved in the creation of the National Employment Rights Authority, and was a lead negotiator for the Croke Park Agreement. She was also elected as joint vice-president of the Irish Congress of Trade Unions (ICTU).

King was elected as general secretary of the ICTU in 2015, the first woman to hold the post. She had been considered the front-runner for the role. The Sunday Times described her at the time as "very pragmatic" and "not really of the political left".

Trade union offices
Preceded by Brendan Hayes	Vice President of SIPTU; 2010–2015	Succeeded by Gene Mealy
Preceded by David Begg	General Secretary of the Irish Congress of Trade Unions; 2015–2022	Succeeded by Owen Reidy
