= National Union of Sheet Metal Workers of Ireland =

NUSMWI
- National Union of Sheet Metal Workers of Ireland
- Merged into: Union of Construction, Allied Trades and Technicians
- Founded: 1836
- Dissolved: 2011
- Headquarters: Dublin
- Location: Ireland
- Affiliations: Irish Congress of Trade Unions (former)

The National Union of Sheet Metal Workers of Ireland (NUSMWI) was a trade union representing workers in sheet metal manufacture and related industries in Ireland.

The union was founded in 1836 as a split from the "Dublin Tinsmiths and Sheet Metal Workers Society". It remained very small for many years, with only forty members in 1896. It affiliated to the National Amalgamated Society of Sheet Metal Workers, but when in 1920 that federation became the National Union of Sheet Metal Workers and Braziers, it became independent again, adopting the name National Union of Sheet Metal Workers and Gas Meter Makers. In 1967, it adopted its final name, and by 1970 it had 943 members.

The union merged into the UK-based Union of Construction, Allied Trades and Technicians in 2011. In 2016, that union's Irish members transferred to Connect. The NUSMWI remained inactive but its registration was only cancelled in 2019.
