= Social Partnership =

Social partnership (Irish: Pairtíocht sóisialta) is the term used for the tripartite, triennial national pay agreements reached in Ireland.

The process was initiated in 1987, following a period of high inflation and weak economic growth which led to increased emigration and unsustainable government borrowing and national debt. Strike and wage moderation were important outcomes of the agreements, and this has been seen as a significant contributor to the 'Celtic Tiger' phenomenon. Prior to this, agreement bargaining had been on a local level since 1981; in the previous decade national employer-union deals and 'National Understandings' were the norm, but came under increased pressure.

The corporatist 'social partnership' agreements are agreed between the Government, the main employer groups Irish Business and Employers Confederation (IBEC) and the Construction Industry Federation (CIF) and the trade unions (members of the Irish Congress of Trades Unions). Since 1997, voluntary/community organisations have taken part in the general policy discussions but not in the key wage bargaining element. The corporatist core has been a trade-off of modest wage increases in exchange for a lighter income tax burden. There are also sectoral reforms negotiated and public service pay reviews under the rubric of 'benchmarking' with private sector pay scales.

== Past agreements ==
The current agreement, that has been in place since 2005, is Towards 2016 (T2016), the past agreements are:

- 1987–1990 – Programme for National Recovery (PNR)
- 1991–1994 – Programme for Economic and Social Progress (PESP)
- 1994–1996 – Programme for Competitiveness and Work (PCW)
- 1997–2000 – Partnership 2000, for Inclusion, Employment and Competitiveness (P2000)
- 2000–2003 – Programme for Prosperity and Fairness (PPF)
- 2003–2005 – Sustaining Progress (SP)

=== Sustaining Progress ===
Sustaining Progress operated from January 2003 to December 2005, setting centralised, national wage increases, and providing for policy agreements over welfare, education, health and employment issues. It was the sixth of the series of neo-corporatist agreements since 1987 with the national wage agreement details negotiated in two separate tranches broadly covering 2003–4 and 2005-6.

Its core participants were: (1) the Government through the Department of the Taoiseach (Prime Minister's Office); (2) the main employers' unions which are the Irish Business and Employers Confederation (IBEC) and the Construction Industry Federation (CIF); and (3) the Irish Congress of Trade Unions (ICTU) which is the umbrella body for over 40 trades unions representing around 550,000 members coming from all over the country. They account for about one-third of the number of employees in the state.

== Towards 2016 ==
The seventh social partnership agreement, titled Towards 2016 was concluded in June 2006 with pay terms due to run to early 2008. These provide for cumulative wage increases set at 10.4pc over a 27-month period with minor adjustments for those earning less than €400 a week. The pay and policy pact also includes increased enforcement measures for employment protection and compliance with established labour standards. Its aspirational social and welfare provisions are built around a loose ten-year social democratic-style commitment towards improved provision of welfare and state services.

The trades unions, through the Irish Congress of Trades Unions, voted in early September 2006, by 242 to 84 votes, to accept the agreement with its largest nursing (INO) and retail (Mandate) unions opting not to participate in the vote. On the same day, the IBEC employers' union also announced its acceptance of "Towards 2016".

The second stage of "Towards 2016" pay terms were agreed in September 2008 and accepted in an ICTU delegate ballot by 305 votes in favour to 36 against in November. Unions which had previously opposed or abstained from the pay agreements adopted a much more supportive stance in the face of rapidly rising unemployment and deteriorating public finances. Unite, the British-based amalgamation of the ATGWU and Amicus trades unions, provided the main opposition.

The second stage pay terms provided a 6% pay increase over a 21-month period, payable in two stages, following a three-month pay freeze in the private sector and an 11-month pay freeze in the public service. The terms were accepted by IBEC, the main employers' union, on the same day but the Construction Industry Federation (CIF) withheld consent as it had sought a 12-month pay freeze for employees in construction.

The terms also include an additional 0.5% wage rise for those earning less than €11 an hour and maintains the inability-to-pay provisions for companies in financial or trading difficulties.

== Partnership collapse ==
Concern at exchequer deficits of over €20 billion, resulting from the collapse of the construction speculative bubble, dominated political discourse and over two decades of social corporatism was continuously questioned during 2009. Increasing unemployment—rising from 4% to 12% in two years—fuelled public questioning of pay rates in the public sector and its allied security of employment, compared with the pay freezes and increased redundancies experienced in the private sector.

The second stage pay terms, described as a 'transition agreement', effectively collapsed at the end of 2009 when the Government imposed income cuts of between 5% and 8% for about 315,000 public servants in its Budget. Belated attempts by the ICTU public service committee to offer efficiencies and flexibility in public service work practices, allied to a vague proposal for 12 days unpaid leave to be taken by all public servants during 2010, failed to secure either political or public support or prevent the income reductions.

Nine months earlier (March 2009) the Fianna Fáil/Green Party coalition government had imposed a 5% 'pension levy' on public service earnings to 'compensate' for the earnings-related defined benefit pensions enjoyed by public service employees. In June 2009 the government and IBEC failed to secure agreement with ICTU to amend the transition pay terms to reflect the impact of an economic depression and deflation in consumer prices.

At the end of December 2009 the main employer body, IBEC, formally withdrew from the terms of the transition agreement having failed to agree a suspension of the pay terms with ICTU. It stated that "we are entering a period of enterprise level bargaining in unionised employments". [Industrial Relations News, issue No.1, January 2010, page 3].

Following 23 years of social partnership the Irish trades unions (ICTU) entered the new decade seriously weakened and with union employee density down to 31% compared to a density highpoint of 62% in the early 1980s preceding the series of seven corporatist social pacts. Union penetration is highly imbalanced with a density approaching 80% in the public sector and around 20% in the larger private sector. Union members are now more likely to be over 45, married with children, Irish-born with third-level qualifications and working in semi-professional occupations, especially in the health, education or public administration sectors.

Instead of reviving the Christian-democratic form of corporatism which dominated Ireland's social partnership, ICTU leaders renewed their proposals for a social-democratic arrangement modelled on some Nordic states welfare systems. The trades unions lack the political influence to develop a social-democratic political force while the current Irish government is suggesting a form of 'social dialogue' to replace the more rigid 'social partnership' arrangements.

In March 2010, under the banner of "social dialogue", the ICTU public service unions and the Government negotiated a three-year pay-freeze and the potential claw-back of some of the imposed pay-cuts in return for verified efficiencies and increased flexible working rosters and mobility of up to 45 km between workplaces. It also included an accord on reviewing any decisions to outsource some aspects of public services to ensure value-for-money. Unlike earlier "social partnership" procedures the main private sector employer bodies were not involved and the negotiations were facilitated by the state Labour Relations Commission (LRC).

== See also ==
- Co-determination
- Corporatism
