= Workers' Union of Ireland =

Irish trade union (1924–90)

- Merged into: SIPTU
- Founded: 15 June 1924
- Dissolved: 1 January 1990
- Headquarters: Dublin, Ireland
- Location: Ireland
- Members: 55,000 (1985)
- Key people: James Larkin
- Affiliations: ICTU, Labour Party

The Workers' Union of Ireland (WUI), later the Federated Workers' Union of Ireland, was an Irish trade union formed in 1924. In 1990, it merged with the Irish Transport and General Workers Union to form the Services, Industrial, Professional and Technical Union (SIPTU).

== History ==
The WUI was formed in 1924 as a consequence of the clashes between James Larkin and the incumbent leadership of the ITGWU, subsequent to his 1923 release from Sing Sing and return to Ireland in April 1923. Larkin, still officially general secretary of the ITGWU, clashed bitterly with William O'Brien, who had taken leadership of the ITGWU, the Irish Labour Party and the Irish Trades Union Congress.

During Larkin's absence at the 1924 Comintern congress (and possibly against his wishes), his brother Peter led their supporters out of the ITGWU, forming the WUI. The new union quickly grew, gaining the allegiance of about two thirds of the Dublin membership of the ITGWU and of a smaller number of rural members. It affiliated to the pro-Soviet Red International of Labour Unions, but during the 1930s gradually entered the mainstream of the Irish trade union movement, being admitted to the Dublin Trades Council in 1936 (although the Irish Trades Union Congress would not accept its membership application until 1945).

In 1941 a new trade union bill was published by the Government. Inspired by an internal trade union restructuring proposal by O'Brien, it was viewed as a threat by the smaller general unions and the Irish branches of British unions (known as the 'amalgamated unions'). Larkin and the WUI played a leading role in the unsuccessful campaign against the bill.

After Big Jim Larkin's 1947 death, his son James Larkin Jnr became general secretary, and continued to preside over a gradual expansion of the WUI, including amalgamations with a number of other unions. In 1979, the Federation of Rural Workers merged in, and the union renamed itself as the "Federated Workers' Union of Ireland".

== Mergers ==
Numerous smaller trade unions merged into the Workers' Union:

1929: Dublin Regular Chimney Cleaners' Trade Union
1951: Irish Airline Pilots' Association
1953: Assistant Officers' and Superintendent Assistance Officers' Association
1956: Irish Liver Assurance Employees' Union
1960: Player Wills Staff Association
1961: Irish Medical Scientists' Association
1962: Vocational Education Clerical Association
1964: Association of Chief Administrative Officers of Hospitals, Irish Airlines Executive Staffs' Association, Irish Pharmaceutical and Medical Representatives' Association, Voluntary Hospitals Clerical and Administrative Staffs' Association
1965: Aer Lingus Executive Staff Association, An Foras Taluntais Technical Officers' Staff Association, Association of Irish Radiographers, Dublin Institute for Advanced Studies Staff Association, Institute for Industrial Research and Standards Staff Association, Guinness Technical Staff Association
1979: Federation of Rural Workers
1983: Irish Agricultural Officers' Organisation
1984: Irish Women Workers' Union
1987: National Association of Transport Employees, United Stationary Engine Drivers, Cranemen, Motormen and Firemen's Trade Union

== General Secretaries ==
1923: James Larkin
1947: James Larkin Jnr
1969: Denis Larkin
1977: Paddy Cardiff
1982: Bill Attley

== See also ==
- List of trade unions
