= Veterinary Officers' Association =

The Veterinary Officers' Association (VOA, Irish: Cumann Oifigigh Tréidliachta) is a trade union representing veterinarians who work for the Irish Civil Service.

The union was founded in 1904. In 1927, it was renamed as the Veterinary Inspectors' Association of the Department of Lands and Agriculture, Saorstát Éireann, commonly being referred to as the Veterinary Inspectors' Association. In 1971, it joined the Irish Congress of Trade Unions.

The union later became known as the Veterinary Officers' Association. In 2018, it claimed to have 255 members.
