= James Larkin Jnr =

Irish politician and trade unionist (1904–1969)

- Larkin, c. 1930s

Teachta Dála
- In office February 1948 – March 1957
- Constituency: Dublin South-Central
- In office June 1943 – February 1948
- Constituency: Dublin South

Personal details
- Born: 20 August 1904 Liverpool, England
- Died: 18 February 1969 (aged 64) Bray, County Wicklow, Ireland
- Party: Labour Party
- Other political affiliations: Communist Party of Ireland (1933); Revolutionary Workers' Groups; Irish Worker League
- Spouse: Josie Larkin
- Children: 4
- Parent: James Larkin (father)
- Relatives: Denis Larkin (brother)
- Education: St. Enda's School

James Larkin Jnr (20 August 1904 – 18 February 1969) was an Irish Labour Party politician and trade union official.

He was born in Liverpool, England, the eldest of four sons of James Larkin, trade union leader, and Elizabeth Larkin (née Brown), daughter of a baptist lay preacher from County Down. After the family's move to Dublin in 1909, James was educated at St. Enda's School, Rathfarnham, the only school that would accept the young Larkins owing to the reputation of their father. James endured much hardship as a child during the period of his father's intense union activity, including eviction from the family home in Auburn Street.

He first stood for election as an Irish Worker League candidate at the September 1927 general election for the Dublin County constituency but was unsuccessful. His father, James Larkin, was a successful candidate for the Dublin North constituency at the same general election. The younger Larkin was one of two candidates for the Revolutionary Workers' Groups in the 1930 newly reformed Dublin City Council elections, and he was elected. He was also an unsuccessful independent candidate at the 1932 general election for the Dublin South constituency. On the foundation of the Communist Party of Ireland in 1933, Larkin became its chairman.

He attended the International Lenin School with Padraic Breslin and Sean Murray.

He was first elected to Dáil Éireann as a Labour Party Teachta Dála (TD) for the Dublin South constituency at the 1943 general election, where he sat in the same Dáil as his father. He was re-elected at the 1944 general election for the same constituency. At the 1948 general election, when the constituency was divided, he was elected for the Dublin South-Central constituency and was re-elected at the 1951 and 1954 general elections. He did not contest the 1957 general election.

== See also ==
- Families in the Oireachtas

Trade union offices
Preceded by James Larkin	General Secretary of the Workers' Union of Ireland; 1947–1969	Succeeded by Denis Larkin
Preceded by Louie Bennett	President of the Irish Trades Union Congress; 1949	Succeeded by Sam Kyle
Preceded by Helen Chenevix	President of the Irish Trades Union Congress; 1952	Succeeded by Con Connolly
Preceded by John Conroy	President of the Irish Congress of Trade Unions; 1960	Succeeded by Norman Kennedy

Dáil	Election	Deputy (Party)	Deputy (Party)	Deputy (Party)	Deputy (Party)	Deputy (Party)	Deputy (Party)	Deputy (Party)
2nd	1921	Thomas Kelly (SF)	Daniel McCarthy (SF)	Constance Markievicz (SF)	Cathal Ó Murchadha (SF)	4 seats 1921–1923		
3rd	1922	Thomas Kelly (PT-SF)	Daniel McCarthy (PT-SF)	William O'Brien (Lab)	Myles Keogh (Ind.)	4 seats 1921–1923		
4th	1923	Philip Cosgrave (CnaG)	Daniel McCarthy (CnaG)	Constance Markievicz (Rep)	Myles Keogh (Ind.)	Cathal Ó Murchadha (Rep)	Michael Hayes (CnaG)	Peadar Doyle (CnaG)
4th	1923 by-election	Philip Cosgrave (CnaG)	Daniel McCarthy (CnaG)	Constance Markievicz (Rep)	Myles Keogh (Ind.)	Cathal Ó Murchadha (Rep)	Hugh Kennedy (CnaG)	Peadar Doyle (CnaG)
4th	March 1924 by-election	James O'Mara (CnaG)	Daniel McCarthy (CnaG)	Constance Markievicz (Rep)	Myles Keogh (Ind.)	Cathal Ó Murchadha (Rep)	Hugh Kennedy (CnaG)	Peadar Doyle (CnaG)
4th	November 1924 by-election	James O'Mara (CnaG)	Daniel McCarthy (CnaG)	Constance Markievicz (Rep)	Myles Keogh (Ind.)	Cathal Ó Murchadha (Rep)	Seán Lemass (SF)	Peadar Doyle (CnaG)
4th	1925 by-election	James O'Mara (CnaG)	Thomas Hennessy (CnaG)	Constance Markievicz (Rep)	Myles Keogh (Ind.)	Cathal Ó Murchadha (Rep)	Seán Lemass (SF)	Peadar Doyle (CnaG)
5th	1927 (Jun)	James Beckett (CnaG)	Vincent Rice (NL)	Constance Markievicz (FF)	Myles Keogh (Ind.)	Thomas Lawlor (Lab)	Seán Lemass (FF)	Peadar Doyle (CnaG)
5th	1927 by-election	James Beckett (CnaG)	Vincent Rice (NL)	Thomas Hennessy (CnaG)	Myles Keogh (Ind.)	Thomas Lawlor (Lab)	Seán Lemass (FF)	Peadar Doyle (CnaG)
6th	1927 (Sep)	James Beckett (CnaG)	Robert Briscoe (FF)	Thomas Hennessy (CnaG)	Myles Keogh (CnaG)	Frank Kerlin (FF)	Seán Lemass (FF)	Peadar Doyle (CnaG)
7th	1932	James Beckett (CnaG)	Robert Briscoe (FF)	Thomas Hennessy (CnaG)	Myles Keogh (CnaG)	James Lynch (FF)	Seán Lemass (FF)	Peadar Doyle (CnaG)
8th	1933	James Beckett (CnaG)	Robert Briscoe (FF)	James McGuire (CnaG)	Thomas Kelly (FF)	James Lynch (FF)	Seán Lemass (FF)	Peadar Doyle (CnaG)
9th	1937	Myles Keogh (FG)	Robert Briscoe (FF)	Thomas Lawlor (Lab)	Thomas Kelly (FF)	Joseph Hannigan (Ind.)	Seán Lemass (FF)	Peadar Doyle (FG)
10th	1938	James Beckett (FG)	Robert Briscoe (FF)	James Lynch (FF)	Thomas Kelly (FF)	Joseph Hannigan (Ind.)	Seán Lemass (FF)	Peadar Doyle (FG)
10th	1939 by-election	John McCann (FF)	Robert Briscoe (FF)	James Lynch (FF)	Thomas Kelly (FF)	Joseph Hannigan (Ind.)	Seán Lemass (FF)	Peadar Doyle (FG)
11th	1943	Maurice Dockrell (FG)	Robert Briscoe (FF)	James Lynch (FF)	James Larkin Jnr (Lab)	John McCann (FF)	Seán Lemass (FF)	Peadar Doyle (FG)
12th	1944	Maurice Dockrell (FG)	Robert Briscoe (FF)	James Lynch (FF)	James Larkin Jnr (Lab)	John McCann (FF)	Seán Lemass (FF)	Peadar Doyle (FG)
13th	1948	Constituency abolished. See Dublin South-Central, Dublin South-East and Dublin South-West.						

Dáil	Election	Deputy (Party)	Deputy (Party)	Deputy (Party)	Deputy (Party)	Deputy (Party)
22nd	1981	Niall Andrews (FF)	Séamus Brennan (FF)	Nuala Fennell (FG)	John Kelly (FG)	Alan Shatter (FG)
23rd	1982 (Feb)	Niall Andrews (FF)	Séamus Brennan (FF)	Nuala Fennell (FG)	John Kelly (FG)	Alan Shatter (FG)
24th	1982 (Nov)	Niall Andrews (FF)	Séamus Brennan (FF)	Nuala Fennell (FG)	John Kelly (FG)	Alan Shatter (FG)
25th	1987	Tom Kitt (FF)	Séamus Brennan (FF)	Anne Colley (PDs)	John Kelly (FG)	Alan Shatter (FG)
26th	1989	Tom Kitt (FF)	Séamus Brennan (FF)	Nuala Fennell (FG)	Roger Garland (GP)	Alan Shatter (FG)
27th	1992	Tom Kitt (FF)	Séamus Brennan (FF)	Liz O'Donnell (PDs)	Eithne FitzGerald (Lab)	Alan Shatter (FG)
28th	1997	Tom Kitt (FF)	Séamus Brennan (FF)	Liz O'Donnell (PDs)	Olivia Mitchell (FG)	Alan Shatter (FG)
29th	2002	Tom Kitt (FF)	Séamus Brennan (FF)	Liz O'Donnell (PDs)	Olivia Mitchell (FG)	Eamon Ryan (GP)
30th	2007	Tom Kitt (FF)	Séamus Brennan (FF)	Alan Shatter (FG)	Olivia Mitchell (FG)	Eamon Ryan (GP)
30th	2009 by-election	Tom Kitt (FF)	George Lee (FG)	Alan Shatter (FG)	Olivia Mitchell (FG)	Eamon Ryan (GP)
31st	2011	Shane Ross (Ind.)	Peter Mathews (FG)	Alan Shatter (FG)	Olivia Mitchell (FG)	Alex White (Lab)
32nd	2016	Constituency abolished. See Dublin Rathdown, Dublin South-West and Dún Laoghaire.				

Dáil	Election	Deputy (Party)	Deputy (Party)	Deputy (Party)	Deputy (Party)	Deputy (Party)
13th	1948	Seán Lemass (FF)	James Larkin Jnr (Lab)	Con Lehane (CnaP)	Maurice E. Dockrell (FG)	John McCann (FF)
14th	1951	Seán Lemass (FF)	James Larkin Jnr (Lab)	Philip Brady (FF)	Maurice E. Dockrell (FG)	John McCann (FF)
15th	1954	Seán Lemass (FF)	James Larkin Jnr (Lab)	Thomas Finlay (FG)	Maurice E. Dockrell (FG)	Celia Lynch (FF)
16th	1957	Seán Lemass (FF)	Jack Murphy (Ind.)	Philip Brady (FF)	Maurice E. Dockrell (FG)	Celia Lynch (FF)
16th	1958 by-election	Seán Lemass (FF)	Patrick Cummins (FF)	Philip Brady (FF)	Maurice E. Dockrell (FG)	Celia Lynch (FF)
17th	1961	Seán Lemass (FF)	Patrick Cummins (FF)	Philip Brady (FF)	Maurice E. Dockrell (FG)	Joseph Barron (CnaP)
18th	1965	Seán Lemass (FF)	Frank Cluskey (Lab)	Philip Brady (FF)	Maurice E. Dockrell (FG)	Thomas J. Fitzpatrick (FF)
19th	1969	Richie Ryan (FG)	Ben Briscoe (FF)	Philip Brady (FF)	John O'Donovan (Lab)	4 seats 1969–1977
20th	1973	Richie Ryan (FG)	Ben Briscoe (FF)	Philip Brady (FF)	John Kelly (FG)	4 seats 1969–1977
21st	1977	Fergus O'Brien (FG)	Frank Cluskey (Lab)	Thomas J. Fitzpatrick (FF)	3 seats 1977–1981	
22nd	1981	Fergus O'Brien (FG)	Ben Briscoe (FF)	Thomas J. Fitzpatrick (FF)	Gay Mitchell (FG)	John O'Connell (Note: O'Connell served as Ceann Comhairle in the 22nd and 23rd Dáil from 1981 to 1983 and was returned automatically at the February 1982 and November 1982 general elections. He joined Fianna Fáil in January 1985.) (Ind.)
23rd	1982 (Feb)	Frank Cluskey (Lab)	Ben Briscoe (FF)	Thomas J. Fitzpatrick (FF)	Gay Mitchell (FG)	John O'Connell (Ind.)
24th	1982 (Nov)	Frank Cluskey (Lab)	Ben Briscoe (FF)	Fergus O'Brien (FG)	Gay Mitchell (FG)	John O'Connell (Ind.)
25th	1987	Frank Cluskey (Lab)	Ben Briscoe (FF)	Fergus O'Brien (FG)	Gay Mitchell (FG)	Mary Mooney (FF)
26th	1989	John O'Connell (FF)	Ben Briscoe (FF)	Fergus O'Brien (FG)	Gay Mitchell (FG)	Eric Byrne (WP)
27th	1992	John O'Connell (FF)	Ben Briscoe (FF)	Pat Upton (Lab)	Gay Mitchell (FG)	4 seats 1992–2002
27th	1994 by-election	Eric Byrne (DL)	Ben Briscoe (FF)	Pat Upton (Lab)	Gay Mitchell (FG)	4 seats 1992–2002
28th	1997	Seán Ardagh (FF)	Ben Briscoe (FF)	Pat Upton (Lab)	Gay Mitchell (FG)	4 seats 1992–2002
28th	1999 by-election	Seán Ardagh (FF)	Ben Briscoe (FF)	Mary Upton (Lab)	Gay Mitchell (FG)	4 seats 1992–2002
29th	2002	Seán Ardagh (FF)	Aengus Ó Snodaigh (SF)	Mary Upton (Lab)	Gay Mitchell (FG)	Michael Mulcahy (FF)
30th	2007	Seán Ardagh (FF)	Aengus Ó Snodaigh (SF)	Mary Upton (Lab)	Catherine Byrne (FG)	Michael Mulcahy (FF)
31st	2011	Eric Byrne (Lab)	Aengus Ó Snodaigh (SF)	Joan Collins (PBP)	Catherine Byrne (FG)	Michael Conaghan (Lab)
32nd	2016	Bríd Smith (AAA–PBP)	Aengus Ó Snodaigh (SF)	Joan Collins (Note: Founded Right to Change in May 2020.) (I4C)	Catherine Byrne (FG)	4 seats from 2016
33rd	2020	Bríd Smith (S–PBP)	Aengus Ó Snodaigh (SF)	Joan Collins (I4C)	Patrick Costello (GP)	4 seats from 2016
34th	2024	Catherine Ardagh (FF)	Aengus Ó Snodaigh (SF)	Máire Devine (SF)	Jen Cummins (SD)	4 seats from 2016
