= John Lawlor =

John or Johnny Lawlor may refer to:

- John Lawlor (actor) (1941–2025), American actor
- John Lawlor (athlete) (1934–2018), Irish Olympic athlete
- John Lawlor (cricketer) (1864–1908), Australian cricketer
- John Lawlor (sculptor) (c. 1820–1901), Irish sculptor and medallist
- Johnny Lawlor (1937–2022), Scottish footballer
- Kit Lawlor (John Christopher Lawlor, 1922–2004), Irish footballer
