= Ibec =

Irish Business Organisation

- Formation: 1993
- Location: 84/86 Baggot Street Lower, Dublin, Ireland
- President: Anne O'Leary, Head of Meta in Ireland
- CEO: Danny McCoy
- Website: www.ibec.ie

Ibec is an Irish business representative lobbying organisation and human resources services provider. It is directed and managed by a board, national council, and executive director team.

== History ==
Ibec is an orphan acronym dating from a 2016 rebranding of the Irish Business and Employers Confederation (IBEC). IBEC was founded in 1993 by the merger of the Federation of Irish Employers (FIE) and the Confederation of Irish Industry (CII).

The FIE and CII had overlapping membership; the FIE dealt with labour relations and the CII with other matters including lobbying the government. The FIE's history begins with the foundation of the Dublin Employers' Federation by William Martin Murphy in 1911, which was incorporated in 1928 as Federated Employers Ltd, renamed the Federated Union of Employers (FUE) in 1942 when it absorbed groups outside its Dublin base, and finally renamed FIE in 1989. The CII began in 1932 in the Anglo-Irish trade war as the Federation of Irish Industries (FII), a group advocating protectionism. The name changed successively to "Federation of Saorstát Industries" in 1934; "Federation of Irish Manufacturers" (FIM) in 1938; "Federation of Irish Industries" again in 1958; and finally "Confederation of Irish Industry" in 1969.

== Structure ==
The CEO of Ibec is Danny McCoy who assumed the role in June 2009.

With over 270 employees, Ibec engages with stakeholders in Ireland and internationally through six regional offices (Dublin, Cork, Galway, Waterford, Limerick and Donegal,) and a Brussels office, along with a network in the UK and US. In its marketing materials Ibec states that its members employ over 70% of the private sector workforce in Ireland.

Ibec's policies and strategic priorities are set by its board and national council which are implemented by Ibec's executive director team. The Ibec board is responsible for corporate governance and strategic direction. The board is chaired by Ibec President, Anne O'Leary, Head of Meta in Ireland.

As of 2025, there were 39 trade associations within the Ibec organisation.

Ibec's central and final decision-making authority is the over 100 member national council which signs off on key Ibec policy positions. This provides a forum for the exchange of views between the constituent members and groupings of Ibec on policy, sectoral and organisational issues.
