= Congress of Irish Unions =

Irish confederation of trade unions

The Congress of Irish Unions was a confederation of trade unions in Ireland.

== History ==
Congress was one of the two governing bodies that emerged after the split in the Irish trade union body the Irish Trades Union Congress in 1945. The split developed under pressure from an anticipated fresh labour-state relationship, and alleged 'British domination in ITUC'. The CIU consisted entirely of Irish-based unions, and retained 77,500 workers, including the members of the Irish Transport and General Workers' Union. The aim of the CIU was to create a trade union movement in Ireland which was Irish-based and nationalistic in outlook, in contrast to the more internationalist and socialist ITUC which had 146,000 members. The Government, contrary to expectation, did not legislate against the British unions, and from 1953 encouraged a détente between the two factions. The confederations amalgamated in 1959, becoming the Irish Congress of Trade Unions.

== Affiliates ==
On formation, the following unions affiliated to the Congress:

Building Workers' Trade Union
Dublin Typographical Provident Society
Electrical Trades Union (Ireland)
Electrotypers' and Stereotypers' Society
Irish Bookbinders' and Allied Trades Union
Irish Engineering Industrial Union
Irish National Union of Vintners', Grocers' and Allied Trades Assistants
Irish Seamen and Port Workers' Union
Irish Society of Woodcutting Machinists
Irish Transport and General Workers' Union
Irish Union of Distributive Workers and Clerks
Operative Plasterers' Trade Society
United Ship and House Painters' and Decorators' Trade Union

By 1954, the following unions held membership:

Union	Membership
Automobile Drivers' and Automobile Mechanics' Union	1,500
Building Workers' Trade Union	1,700
Dublin Typographical Provident Society	1,267
Electrical Trades Union (Ireland)	2,500
Electrotypers' and Stereotypers' Society	83
Guild of Irish Journalists	46
Irish Actors' Equity Association	210
Irish Bookbinders' and Allied Trades Union	1,075
Irish Engineering, Industrial and Electrical Trade Union	1,978
Irish Engineering and Foundry Union	2,960
Irish National Union of Vintners', Grocers' and Allied Trades' Assistants	3,844
Irish National Union of Woodworkers	950
Irish Seamen's and Port Workers' Union	2,950
Irish Society of Woodcutting Machinists	750
Irish Sub-Postmasters' Union	1,500
Irish Transport and General Workers' Union	148,442
Irish Union of Distributive Workers and Clerks	14,697
National Union of Sheet Metal Workers and Gas Meter Makers of Ireland	300
Operative Plasterers' Trade Society	1,300
Racecourse Bookmakers' Assistants' Association	200
Regular Dublin Coopers' Society	254
United House and Ship Painters' and Decorators' Trade Union of Ireland	423

== Secretaries ==
1945: Cathal O'Shannon
1946: Leo Crawford

== Presidents ==
Year	President	Union
1945–46	Gerard Owens	Electrical Trades Union (Ireland)
1947	Thomas Kennedy	Irish Transport and General Workers Union
1948	W. J. Whelan	Dublin Typographical Provident Society
1949	Owen Hynes	Building Workers' Trade Union
1950	Michael Colgan	Irish Bookbinders' and Allied Trades Union
1951	John Conroy	Irish Transport and General Workers Union
1952	Walter Beirne	Irish National Union of Vintners', Grocers' and Allied Trade Assistants
1953	William McMullen	Irish Transport and General Workers Union
1954	Gerald Doyle	Operative Plasterers' Trade Society
1955	John O'Brien	Irish Engineering, Industrial and Electrical Trade Union
1956	Michael Mervyn	Electrical Trades Union (Ireland)
1957	Laurence Hudson	United House and Ships Painters' and Decorators' Trade Union of Ireland
1958–59	Terence Farrell	Irish Bookbinders' and Allied Trades Union

Source: Donal Nevin et al., Trade Union Century, pp. 438–439

== Sources ==
From the EMIRE database, which is the online version of the European Employment and Industrial Relations Glossaries
