= IPU =

IPU may refer to:

== Organizations ==
- Inter-Parliamentary Union, the world organization of parliaments
- International Peasant Union, a political international of agrarian anti-communist parties
- Interplanetary Phenomenon Unit, claimed by some ufologists to be a division of the US Government involved with UFOs
- Irish Postal Union, a trade union
- Irish Print Union, a trade union
- Independence Party (Finland), Itsenäisyyspuolue (IPU)

=== Schools ===
- Indraprasta PGRI University, Indonesia
- International Pacific University, Japan
- International Psychoanalytic University Berlin, Germany
- Ishikawa Prefectural University, Japan
- Iwate Prefectural University, Japan
- Guru Gobind Singh Indraprastha University, India, formerly Indraprastha University

== Technology ==
- Intelligence Processing Unit, a microprocessor specialised for processing machine learning workloads, pioneered by UK based semiconductor startup Graphcore
- Interconnect processing unit, a compound hardware/software component employed in multiprocessor system-on-chip
- Image Processing Unit, a processor for processing digital images
- Infrastructure processing unit, a processor which can handle complex networking and infrastructure duties beyond what a traditional NIC would support

== Other uses ==
- International Pop Underground Convention, a music festival in Olympia, Washington, US
- Integrated Police Unit of the European Union missions.
- Invisible Pink Unicorn, the goddess of a parody religion aimed at satirizing theistic beliefs
- Isoproturon, a herbicide active ingredient

== See also ==
- Ipu, Ceará, a town in Brazil
- Ipu, a percussion instrument made from gourds
- Ipu (nurse), a royal nurse during the 18th Dynasty of ancient Egypt
- Akhmim, a city in Egypt, ancient name Ipu
