= 1920 Dublin Corporation election =

Part of the 1920 Irish local elections

- 15 January 1920

All 80 seats to Dublin Corporation 41 seats needed for a majority
	First party	Second party	Third party
Leader	Thomas Kelly		James Hubbard Clark
Party	Sinn Féin	Labour	Municipal Reform
Seats won	42	14	9
- Map showing the largest party, and affiliation of councillors, by electoral area. Sinn Féin received a majority of the vote in wards 1, 3, 6, and 7, and a plurality in 2, 5, 9, and 10. Independent Nationalists received a majority of the vote in ward 8, and Official Nationalists won a plurality in ward 4. Whilst Sinn Féin was the single largest party in ward 2, Municipal Reform and Unionist candidates together won more votes.
Lord Mayor of Dublin before election
Laurence O'Neill
Ind. Nationalist
Elected Lord Mayor of Dublin
Thomas Kelly (de jure)
Laurence O'Neill (de facto)
Sinn Féin

An election to Dublin Corporation took place on Thursday, 15 January 1920 as part of the 1920 Irish local elections. Dublin was divided into ten borough electoral areas to elect 80 councillors for a five-year term of office on the system of proportional representation by means of the single transferable vote (PR-STV).

Sinn Féin won a slight majority in the council, with 42 seats. Whilst the Sinn Féin majority was small, they emerged from the election as by far the largest party on the Dublin Corporation council.

Following the election Thomas Kelly, the Sinn Féin MP for Dublin St Stephen's Green, was unanimously elected by the council as the new Lord Mayor of Dublin. Kelly was elected despite being held at the time as a political prisoner in Wormwood Scrubs prison in England. Kelly was nominated for the position by the outgoing Lord Mayor Laurence O'Neill. Due to Kelly's imprisonment O'Neill continued as effective Lord Mayor.

== Boundaries ==
These were the first elections under the Local Government (Ireland) Act 1919, which introduced a form of proportional representation. Under the old ward system, each of 20 wards had elected one alderman and three additional councillors. In 1919, the Local Government Board of Ireland created 10 borough electoral areas (BEAs), taking a greater account of population in the city, which took effect at these elections. Each BEA had between 6 and 10 members. Two councillors from each BEA were designated as aldermen.

Revised boundaries
BEA	Seats	Wards	Former representation
No. 1	9	Arran Quay	4
No. 2	8	Clontarf East, Clontarf West, Drumcondra and Glasnevin	16
No. 3	9	Fitzwilliam, Mansion House, Royal Exchange, South City	16
No. 4	10	Inns Quay and Rotunda	8
No. 5	7	Merchant's Quay	4
No. 6	7	Mountjoy	4
No. 7	9	New Kilmainham and Usher's Quay	8
No. 8	8	North City and North Dock	8
No. 9	6	Wood Quay	4
No. 10	7	Trinity and South Dock	8

== Results by party ==
Party	Seats	±	1st pref	FPv%	±%
Sinn Féin	42	▲38	28,069	45.92	
Labour	14	▲5	7,693	12.58	
Municipal Reform	9	▲9	7,011	11.47	New
Ind. Nationalist	7		9,607	15.72	
Irish Nationalist	4	▼52	3,302	5.40	
Independent	2		4,087	6.69	
Irish Unionist	1	▼4	702	1.49	
Painters Society	1	▲1	265	0.43	New
Ind. Republican	0		275	0.45	
Ind. Socialist	0		182	0.30	
Independent Labour	0		8	0.01	
Totals	80		61,131	100.00	—N/a

== Results by borough electoral area ==
*: Incumbent councillor.

=== No. 1 Electoral Area ===
Arran Quay Ward.

No. 1 Electoral Area: 9 seats
Party	Candidate	FPv%	Count	
Party	Candidate	FPv%	1	2
Sinn Féin	Michael Staines	30.83	1,675	
Labour	Thomas P. O'Reilly (ITGWU)	13.62	740	
Labour	John Farren	10.84	519	589
Sinn Féin	William Paul	6.87	373	741
Irish Nationalist	J. Keogh	5.71	310	
Irish Nationalist	T. Rooney	5.14	279	
Municipal Reform	E. McGeogh	5.04	274	
Sinn Féin	Patrick McIntyre	4.90	266	
Labour	D. Logue	4.66	253	
Sinn Féin	Annie Eliza Ashton	4.38	238	
Sinn Féin	Ml. McHugh	2.87	156	
Sinn Féin	Francis Nolan	2.37	129	
Irish Nationalist	Thomas Kavanagh	2.12	115	
Electorate: 9,741 Valid: 5,433 Spoilt: 145 Quota: 544 Turnout: 5,578

=== No. 2 Electoral Area ===
Clontarf East Ward, Clontarf West Ward, Drumcondra Ward and Glasnevin Ward

The count was particularly long, with no candidates meeting the quota from counts 2 to 14.

No. 2 Electoral Area: 8 seats
Party	Candidate	FPv%	Count
Party	Candidate	FPv%	1
Sinn Féin	Seán McGarry	16.64	1,058
Municipal Reform	James Hubbard Clark	12.08	768
Irish Unionist	W. McCarthy	9.15	582
Municipal Reform	James Moran	7.04	448
Independent	David A. Quaid	6.97	443
Municipal Reform	Michael Moran	6.93	441
Sinn Féin	Thomas Loughlin	6.07	386
Sinn Féin	Robert Rooney	5.82	370
Independent	J. P. MacAvin	4.06	258
Municipal Reform	John Foley	3.93	250
Sinn Féin	S. Macaoilte	3.35	213
Sinn Féin	Gifford Wilson	2.70	172
Sinn Féin	Mary J. McKean	2.28	145
Independent	Michael Maher	2.09	133
Irish Unionist	W. P. Dinnage	1.89	120
Sinn Féin	Sean O'Shea	1.64	104
Independent	James Brady	1.64	104
Independent	Daniel Daly	1.12	71
Independent	C. Monks	1.07	68
Independent	Patrick Ring	1.04	66
Independent Labour	J. Manning (Note: While still appearing on the ballot, Manning withdrew from the election campaign after nominations had closed.)	0.13	8
Electorate: 9,680 Valid: 6,360 Spoilt: 86 Quota: 717 Turnout: 6,446

=== No. 3 Electoral Area ===
Fitzwilliam Ward, Mansion House Ward, Royal Exchange Ward and South City Ward.

No. 3 Electoral Area: 9 seats
Party	Candidate	FPv%	Count										
Party	Candidate	FPv%	1	2	3	4	5	6	7	8	9	10	11
Sinn Féin	Thomas Kelly	41.70	3,438										
Municipal Reform	Andrew Beattie	12.83	1,058										
Municipal Reform	Sir James Gallagher	8.65	713	-	907								
Municipal Reform	J. R. Stritch	7.95	655	-	-	-	-	-	-	-	846		
Labour	O. Hynes (Bricklayers' Union)	5.46	450	-	-	-	-	-	-	-	-	892	
Sinn Féin	Hanna Sheehy-Skeffington	4.12	340	1,551									
Sinn Féin	T. Adkins	3.64	300	-	-	-	-	-	-	-	-	-	830
Independent	William Corrigan	3.46	285										
Sinn Féin	Joe Clarke	3.40	280	-	-	876							
Independent	J. J. Higgins	2.55	210										
Socialist	Walter Carpenter	2.21	182										
Sinn Féin	M. J. White	1.64	135										
Sinn Féin	Robinsou Raul	1.15	95	-	-	-	-	-	-	-	-	-	713
Independent	C. Perkins	0.93	77										
Independent	P. J. Giles	0.32	26										
Electorate: 12,638 Valid: 8,244 Spoilt: - Quota: ≈825 Turnout: -

=== No. 4 Electoral Area ===
Inns Quay Ward and Rotunda Ward.

No. 4 Electoral Area: 10 seats
Party	Candidate	FPv%	Count												
Party	Candidate	FPv%	1	2	3	4	5	6	7	8	9	10	11	12	13
Ind. Nationalist	Laurence O'Neill	48.95	3,672												
Sinn Féin	Seán T. O'Kelly	17.48	1,311												
Sinn Féin	J. Brennan		498	801											
Sinn Féin	M. Flanagan		298	-	-	683									
Irish Nationalist	William P. Delaney		280	-	-	-	-	-	-	-	821				
Painters' Society	Jos Farrell		265	-	-	-	-	-	-	-	-	-	-	690	
Labour	John Lawlor		229	795											
Municipal Reform	James Grierson		185												
Sinn Féin	M. Dowling		143	-	-	-	-	-	-	-	-	-	-	-	620
Sinn Féin	Seán O'Mahony		136	-	-	-	-	-	-	-	-	-	-	737	
Irish Nationalist	P. J. Duffy		121	-	-	-	-	-	-	-	-	-	-	-	599
Sinn Féin	Jennie Wyse Power		110	-	-	-	-	-	-	-	-	-	-	761	
Sinn Féin	Kathleen O'Doherty		106												
Irish Nationalist	M. J. O'Hara		73												
Municipal Reform	Anne Egan		43												
Sinn Féin	Joseph C. Larkin		41												
Electorate: 12,856 Valid: 7,501 Spoilt: 185 Quota: 682 Turnout: 7,686

=== No. 5 Electoral Area ===
Merchant's Quay Ward.

No. 5 Electoral Area: 7 seats
Party	Candidate	FPv%	Count
Party	Candidate	FPv%	1
Sinn Féin	Joseph MacDonagh		1,067
Labour	J. Bohan (ITGWU)		616
Irish Nationalist	William O'Connor		596
Sinn Féin	J. P. Mooney		552
Sinn Féin	Patrick Gordon		375
Municipal Reform	R. H. White		374
Labour	T.D. Herbert		307
Ind. Republican	Arnold Lowe		275
Independent	H. C. Neill Watson		275
Independent	Sarah Harrison		223
Independent	J. Vaughan		194
Sinn Féin	Mrs. McGarry		190
Sinn Féin	Patrick Walsh		178
Irish Nationalist	E. Brooks		55
Independent	J. Reed		30
Electorate: 8,032 Valid: 5,307 Spoilt: 94 Quota: 664 Turnout: 5,401 (67.24%)

=== No. 6 Electoral Area ===
Mountjoy Ward.

No. 6 Electoral Area: 7 seats
Party	Candidate	FPv%	Count								
Party	Candidate	FPv%	1	2	3	4	5	6	7	8	9
Ind. Nationalist	L. G. Sherlock		1,507								
Sinn Féin	Kathleen Clarke		937								
Sinn Féin	P. Mahon		568	751							
Sinn Féin	James Malinn		486	-	769						
Ind. Nationalist	J. M. C. Briscoe		290	799							
Sinn Féin	John Byrne		222	-	-	-	-	-	-	-	493
Ind. Nationalist	William Chase		173	-	-	-	-	-	-	-	591
Sinn Féin	Joseph Toomey		143								
Sinn Féin	Ml. Slater		116	-	-	-	-	-	-	-	456
Municipal Reform	Miss Weldrick		93	-	-	-	-	-	-	-	
Sinn Féin	Mrs O'Shea Leamy		78								
Electorate: 8,784 Valid: 4,613 Spoilt: 113 Quota: 577 Turnout: 4,726

=== No. 7 Electoral Area ===
New Kilmainham Ward and Usher's Quay Ward.

No. 7 Electoral Area: 9 seats
Party	Candidate	FPv%	Count												
Party	Candidate	FPv%	1	2	3	4	5	6	7	8	9	10	11	12	13
Sinn Féin	W. T. Cosgrave		2,033												
Municipal Reform	B.F. Shields		679												
Sinn Féin	P. S. Doyle		625	765											
Labour	D. Magee		578	-	-	-	-	-	-	814					
Sinn Féin	James McGrath		531	1,059											
Labour	J. O'Connor (ITGWU)		409	-	-	-	-	-	-	-	-	-	-	-	686
Irish Nationalist	P. Medlar		314	-	-	-	-	-	-	-	-	-	-	-	624
Irish Nationalist	J. S. Kelly		284												
Labour	L. Keegan		249												
Sinn Féin	A. Fitzpatrick		231	-	-	-	-	-	-	-	-	-	759		
Irish Nationalist	J. Groome		221												
Sinn Féin	John Doran		163	-	-	-	-	-	-	666					
Irish Nationalist	C. Donaghy		117												
Sinn Féin	Michael Lynch		111												
Labour	Mary C. Kelly		14												
Electorate: 9,985 Valid: 6,428 Spoilt: 131 Quota: 650 Turnout: 6,559 (%)

=== No. 8 Electoral Area ===
North City Ward and North Dock Ward.

No. 8 Electoral Area: 8 seats
Party	Candidate	FPv%	Count	
Party	Candidate	FPv%	1	2
Ind. Nationalist	Alfie Byrne		3,180	
Sinn Féin	Francis Cahill		826	
Labour	P. T. Daly		499	1,344
Ind. Nationalist	James Gately		438	879
Sinn Féin	Patrick McDonnell		413	704
Sinn Féin	James V. Lawless		393	780
Sinn Féin	Joseph M. Stanley		299	
Labour	Michael Brohoon (ITGWU)		231	606
Municipal Reform	Dr. MacWalter		192	1,078
Municipal Reform	T.D. Lambert		146	
Sinn Féin	James Mallon		126	
Sinn Féin	Mary Walker		122	
Sinn Féin	Thomas Leahy		96	
Irish Nationalist	J. O'Doherty		45	
Labour	R. Graham		34	
Sinn Féin	Thomas O'Reilly		27	
Irish Nationalist	J. J. Fox		18	
Irish Nationalist	James Higgins		7	
Labour	Michael Mullen		7	
Independent	T. Healy		1	
Electorate: 11,488 Valid: 6,898 Spoilt: 196 Quota: 789 Turnout: 7,094 (%)

=== No. 9 Electoral Area ===
Wood Quay Ward.

No. 9 Electoral Area: 6 seats
Party	Candidate	FPv%	Count									
Party	Candidate	FPv%	1	2	3	4	5	6	7	8	9	10
Sinn Féin	Kathleen Clarke		1,374									
Labour	Thomas Lawlor		1,187									
Labour	Thomas Kennedy (ITGWU)		422	468	582	-	-	614				
Ind. Nationalist	T. Byrne		347	-	409	-	-	-	-	-	-	501
Irish Nationalist	William McCabe		321									
Sinn Féin	John J. Murphy		256	-	-	-	-	-	-	-	636	
Sinn Féin	John Grace		150	635								
Sinn Féin	Patrick McGuirk		105									
Labour	M. C. Scully		51	-	315							
Labour	M. Keavey		15									
Irish Nationalist	M. J. Creagh		12									
Electorate: 6,959 Valid: 4,250 Spoilt: 106 Quota: 606 Turnout: 4,356 (%)

=== No. 10 Electoral Area ===
Trinity Ward and South Dock Ward.

No. 10 Electoral Area: 7 seats
Party	Candidate	FPv%	Count
Party	Candidate	FPv%	1
Sinn Féin	Cathal Ó Murchadha		1,173
Labour	William O'Brien (ITGWU)		883
Sinn Féin	Thomas Cassidy		665
Independent	L. O'Toole		639
Independent	Myles Keogh		634
Sinn Féin	G. A. Lyons		433
Independent	T. M. O'Beirne		350
Municipal Reform	W. J. Maxwell-Lemon		317
Municipal Reform	Sir John Irwin		274
Sinn Féin	John Farrell		259
Sinn Féin	Patrick Power		169
Irish Nationalist	Jeremiah Looney		134
Municipal Reform	Frederick T. Rainford		101
Sinn Féin	William Murray		61
Electorate: 9,075 Valid: 6,097 Spoilt: 146 Quota: 763 Turnout: 6,243 (68.79%)
