= Edmund Browne =

Irish trade unionist

Personal details
- Born: 1937 (age 88–89)

Edmund Browne (born 1937) is an Irish former trade unionist.

Browne became active in the Irish Transport and General Workers' Union (ITGWU), and was elected as vice president in 1983, defeating Des Geraghty by a margin which surprised his supporters. In 1990, the ITGWU merged with the Workers' Union of Ireland to form SIPTU (Services, Industrial, Professional and Technical Union), and Browne was elected as joint General President alongside Bill Attley. Attley later became General Secretary, and Browne held the post alone until his retirement in 1998.

Browne served as Treasurer of the Irish Congress of Trade Unions (ICTU) from 1989 to 1995, and from 1997 to 1999 as ICTU President.

Trade union offices
Preceded by Christy Kirwan	Vice-President of the Irish Transport and General Workers' Union; 1983–1990	Succeeded by Position abolished
Preceded by Christy Kirwan	Treasurer of the Irish Congress of Trade Unions; 1989–1995	Succeeded by Bill Attley
New office	General President of SIPTU; 1990–1998; Served alongside: Bill Attley (1990–1994)	Succeeded by Jimmy Somers
Preceded by John Freeman	President of the Irish Congress of Trade Unions; 1997–1999	Succeeded by Inez McCormack
