= Cathal O'Shannon =

Irish politician, trade unionist and journalist (1890–1969)

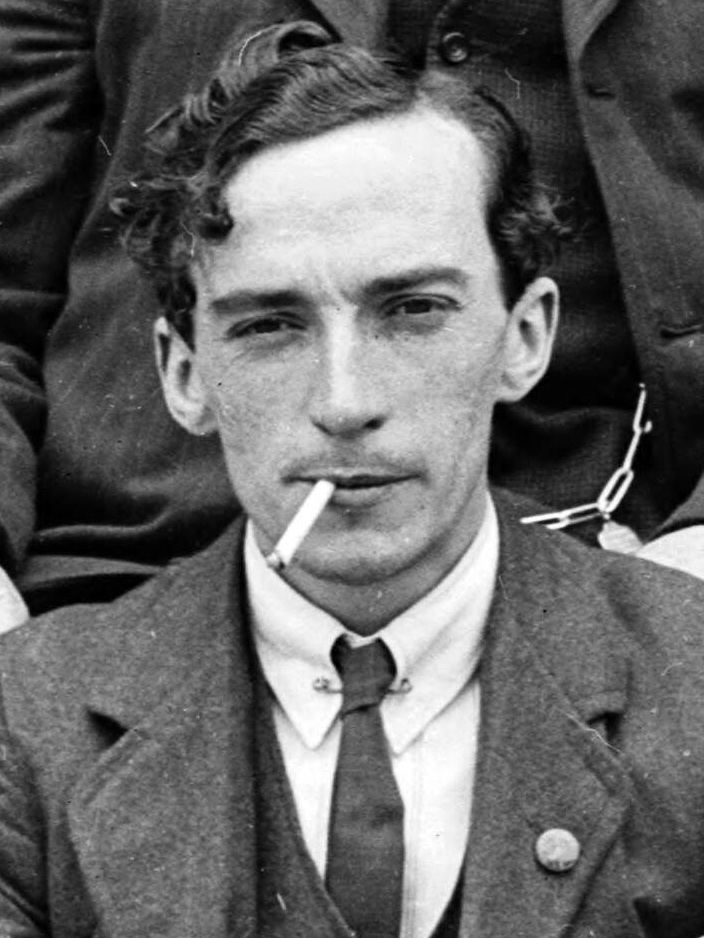
- O'Shannon in 1918

Teachta Dála
- In office June 1922 – August 1923
- Constituency: Louth–Meath

Personal details
- Born: Charles Francis Shannon; 9 June 1890 Randalstown, County Antrim, Ireland
- Died: 4 October 1969 (aged 79) Dublin, Ireland
- Party: Labour Party
- Other political affiliations: Socialist Party of Ireland (1912–1917)
- Spouse: Margaret Finn
- Children: 3, including Cathal
- Education: St Columb's College
- Occupation: Trade union leader, Journalist

Cathal O'Shannon (9 June 1890 – 4 October 1969) was an Irish politician, trade unionist and journalist.

== Early years ==
Charles Francis Shannon was born in Randalstown, County Antrim, he was the third child of Charles and Alice Shannon. As a child the family moved to his mother's hometown of Draperstown, County Londonderry where his father worked for the railway line. Growing up, both his family and locality influenced his interest in trade unionism, the Irish language, and Irish Republicanism. He was educated at Draperstown national school and St Columb's College, Derry. It was at Columb's that he studied history as a subject and developed an interest in journalism. Following the death of his father he moved to Belfast where he began to train for the civil service.

== Republicanism and the Revolutionary era ==
It was while he was in Belfast that he became a member of Conradh na Gaeilge and started writing articles for the Peasant, Sinn Féin and An Claidheamh Soluis publications. It also around this time, under the influence of Seán Mac Diarmada, Bulmer Hobson and Denis McCullough, that he became a member of the secret Republican society the Irish Republican Brotherhood as well as operator of the Belfast branch of Na Fianna Éireann, the Irish Nationalist boy scout group.

By 1910 he had abandoned his studies and was working as a clerk in the Belfast office of the Heysham Steamship Company. It was while working at this job that O'Shannon witnessed labour disputes and sectarian divides between Protestant and Catholic workers. This drew him further into trade unionism and socialism. In 1912 he joined the Irish Transport and General Workers' Union, where he became a full-time assistant to James Connolly, one of the most important figures in the Irish trade union movement. It was under Connolly's influence that he joined the Socialist Party of Ireland, which Connolly had founded.

In 1913, he was one of the founders of Irish Volunteers in Belfast. On Easter Sunday 1916, he mobilised with a hundred Volunteers at Coalisland, County Tyrone; they dispersed when there were no orders from Dublin. He was later arrested by the British authorities who interned him until the General Amnesty of 1917. He was arrested during the German Plot and went on a hunger strike. He was released seventeen days later.

Following his release, O'Shannon began to operate out of cities such as Dublin and Cork, where he worked to hold together the ITGWU in the wake of Connolly's death. At the same time, Connolly's death had caused a power struggle with the Socialist Party of Ireland which had been largely inactive since the outbreak of World War I. O'Shannon, William O'Brien and Sean O'Casey had come to form one wing of the party, while James' son Roddy Connolly and Seán McLoughlin formed another. Both sides sought to woo the Bolsheviks of the on-going Russian Revolution. By 1921 Connolly's faction won over control of the party and expelled O'Shannon and O'Brien, whom they branded as "Reformists", and they then departed for the Labour Party.

In the December 1918 United Kingdom general election, he campaigned for Sinn Féin in Belfast: for Éamon de Valera in Belfast West and for his ITGWU colleague and Connolly's aide de camp in 1916, Winifred Carney in Belfast Victoria. He is thought to have written Carney's manifesto which declared her resolve to fight partition "with the same weapons, and same spirit and determination with which I fought, and am ready to fight again, for the Republic".

Alongside Labour leader Thomas Johnson, O'Shannon helped draft the Democratic Programme, a declaration of economic and social principles that the newly created Dáil Éireann was asked to follow in return for Labour not contesting the 1918 general election. O'Shannon aided the drafting of the programme despite his opposition to the idea of Labour not contesting the election. O'Shannon was becoming increasingly militant, now declaring himself "an Irish Bolshevik" and stating that "the soviet idea was the only one that would confer freedom on Ireland". O'Shannon supported the outbreak of the "Irish soviets", which were a number of actions by striking Irish workers between 1919 and 1920 where they seized control of their workplaces, declared themselves "Soviets" and either ran these workplaces without input from their owners or negotiated for better conditions.

In 1920 O'Shannon began travelling to Britain to speak on behalf of the Irish Revolution, trying to win the support of the British Labour movement. It was in April 1920 that he was arrested and imprisoned for this, on the charge of sedition, and sent to Mountjoy Prison. However, he was released following an 8-day hunger strike.

In October 1921 the peace talks which would eventually lead to the Anglo-Irish Treaty had begun. O'Shannon called for the negotiators not to compromise on the recognition of the Irish Republic. When a deal was announced, O'Shannon supported "neutrality" by the Labour movement in the Irish Civil War and viewed the entire affair as a "distraction", stating instead that the real war which should have been fought should have been a class war.

== Elected as a TD ==
Although he had a reputation as a firebrand socialist radical, O'Shannon was elected to Dáil Éireann at the 1922 general election as a Labour Party TD for Louth–Meath with almost 40% of the vote, twice that of the candidate in second place. He became deputy leader of Labour in the Dáil and as deputy leader he was highly critical of the Cosgrave government, particular on the issue of the public safety bill which granted the National Army extraordinary powers in dealing with the Anti-Treaty IRA. He also spoke out at the execution of anti-treaty prisoners such as Rory O'Connor and Liam Mellows following the Battle of the Four Courts, which he condemned as "the greatest crime...committed in Ireland within these last ten years".

He failed to be re-elected when he stood for the Louth constituency at the 1923 general election amid a national collapse of the Labour party vote which saw their overall vote percentage half. Similarly, he was unable to bounce back in Meath at the September 1927 general elections.

== Later years ==
No longer a TD, O'Shannon remained a prominent figure in Labour however and became to focus on trade unionism while editing The Voice of Labour and The Watchword from 1930 to 1932. In 1941 he became Secretary of the Irish Trades Union Congress, and afterwards of the Congress of Irish Unions. He served for twenty-three years, until his death, as one of the workers' representatives when the Labour Court was established in 1946.

== Personal life ==
In 1924 O'Shannon married Margaret Doris Finn of Stockport, Cheshire, England. The two had met while O'Shannon was active in Britain during the war of independence. Together they had 3 children, one son and two daughters. Their son was Cathal O'Shannon who became a veteran Irish broadcaster and journalist and their daughters were Gráinne and Finola, who were both involved in acting and film production.

He died in Dublin on 4 October 1969 in St Laurence's hospital, and was buried in Deans Grange Cemetery.

== Gallery ==
British Army Military Intelligence file for Cathal O'Shannon

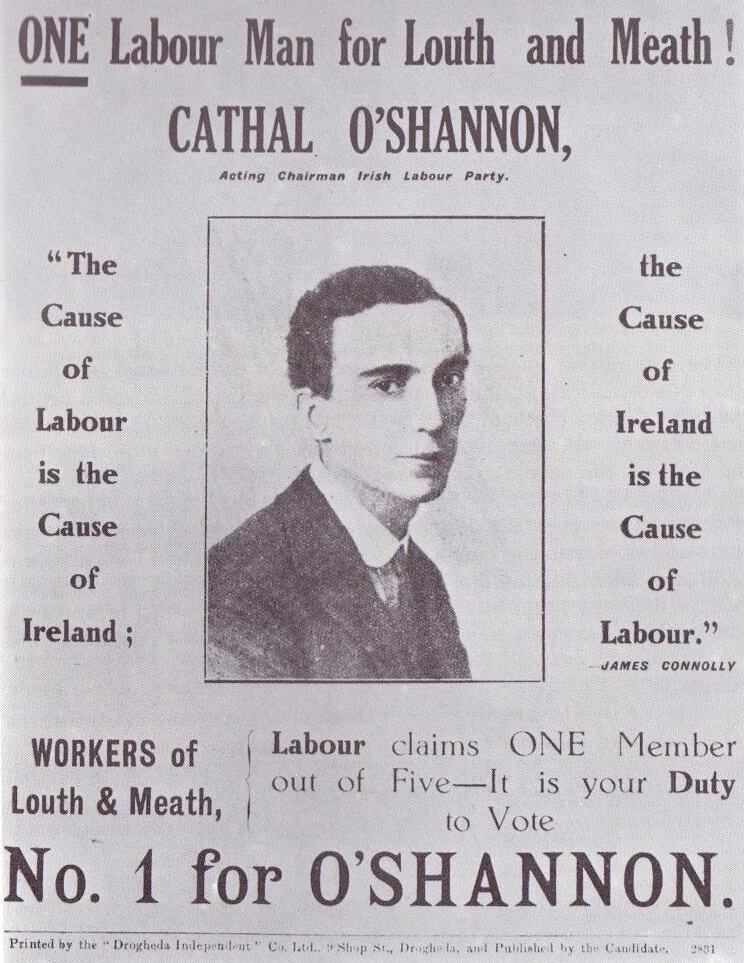
1922 election poster from O'Shannon's campaign in Louth–Meath

Trade union offices
Preceded by Thomas Foran	President of the Irish Trades Union Congress; 1922	Succeeded by Luke Duffy
Preceded by Eamonn Lynch	Secretary of the Irish Trades Union Congress; 1941–1945	Succeeded by Thomas Johnson
New office	Secretary of the Congress of Irish Unions; 1945	Succeeded by Leo Crawford

Dáil	Election	Deputy (Party)	Deputy (Party)	Deputy (Party)	Deputy (Party)	Deputy (Party)
2nd	1921	Justin McKenna (SF)	Eamonn Duggan (SF)	Peter Hughes (SF)	James Murphy (SF)	John J. O'Kelly (SF)
3rd	1922	Cathal O'Shannon (Lab)	Eamonn Duggan (PT-SF)	Peter Hughes (PT-SF)	James Murphy (PT-SF)	John J. O'Kelly (AT-SF)
4th	1923	Constituency abolished. See Louth and Meath				
