= Bill Attley =

Irish trade unionist and football referee

Personal details
- Other political affiliations: Labour Party (Ireland)
- Education: National College of Industrial Relations
- Occupation: Unionist and referee

William A. Attley (born 5 April 1938) is a former Irish trade unionist and football referee.

Born in Rathcoole, County Dublin, Attley studied at the National College of Industrial Relations. He became active in the Workers' Union of Ireland (WUI), being elected as a branch secretary in 1968, then Deputy General Secretary in 1977 and General Secretary from 1982. In 1990, he led a merger of the WUI with the Irish Transport and General Workers' Union, forming SIPTU (Services, Industrial, Professional and Technical Union), serving as joint General President until 1994, then as General Secretary until his retirement in 1998.

Outside trade unionism, Attley was active in the Labour Party, and was a keen football referee, ultimately working with UEFA to recruit and train referees, and in his retirement becoming chief referee assessor for the Football Association of Ireland.

Trade union offices
Preceded by Paddy Cardiff	General Secretary of the Workers' Union of Ireland; 1982–1990	Succeeded by Position abolished
New office	General President of SIPTU; 1990–1994; Served alongside: Edmund Browne	Succeeded by Edmund Browne
Preceded by Tom Garry and Christy Kirwan	General Secretary of SIPTU; 1994–1998	Succeeded by John McDonnell
Preceded by Edmund Browne	Treasurer of the Irish Congress of Trade Unions; 1995–1999	Succeeded by Jimmy Somers
