= Jimmy Somers =

Irish trade unionist (1939–2024)

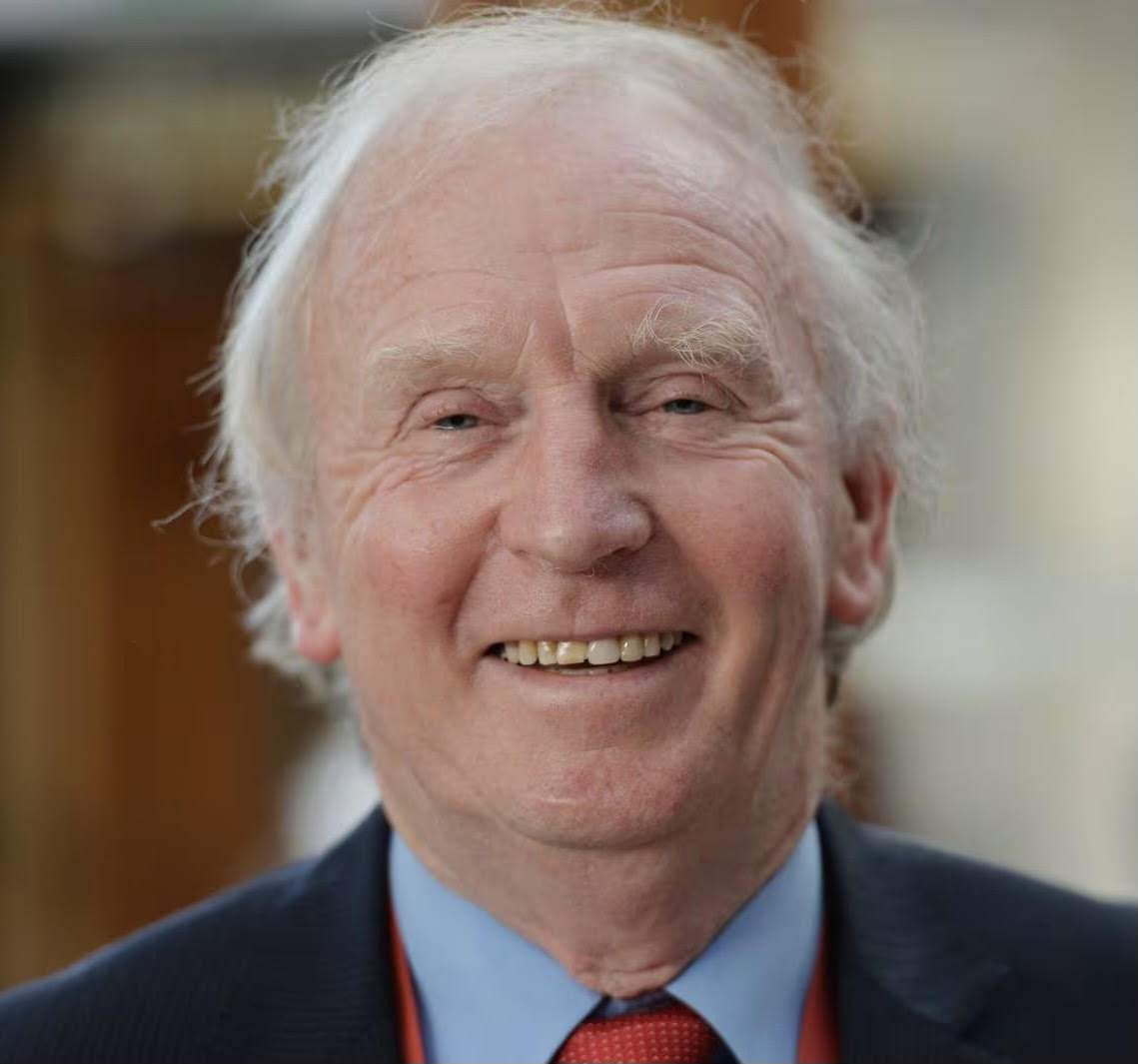
Somers, at the Labour Party Conference in 2014

Jimmy Somers (2 November 1939 – 12 January 2024) was an Irish trade unionist, former President of SIPTU and Labour Party activist.

== Biography ==
Born in Cabra, Dublin, Somers became active in the Irish Transport and General Workers' Union (ITGWU), soon being elected as a branch secretary, and leading the party delegation to Dublin Trades Council.

Somers also became active in the Labour Party, in which he was a leading supporter of Michael O'Leary. He stood for the party in Dublin North-West at the 1973 Irish general election, then in Dublin Central at the 1981 Irish general election and the November 1982 Irish general election, but was not elected on any occasion. He finally stood at the 1983 Dublin Central by-election, at which he took Labour's worst ever result in the constituency.

In 1990, the ITGWU became part of the new SIPTU (Services, Industrial, Professional and Technical Union), and in 1994 Somers became the union's Vice President, in which position he played a key role in negotiating partnership agreements with the government. In 1997, he was narrowly elected as President of SIPTU, retiring two years later to serve on the Labour Court and Labour Relations Commission.

Somers also served as Treasurer of the Irish Congress of Trade Unions from 1999 to 2001.

He died on 12 January 2024, in the Mater Hospital, Dublin, at the age of 84.

Trade union offices
New office	Vice President of SIPTU; 1994–1997	Succeeded by Des Geraghty
Preceded by Edmund Browne	General President of SIPTU; 1997–1999	Succeeded by Des Geraghty
Preceded by Bill Attley	Treasurer of the Irish Congress of Trade Unions; 1999–2001	Succeeded by John McDonnell
