= Building and Allied Trades' Union =

- Founded: 1998
- Headquarters: Dublin, Ireland
- Location: Ireland
- Members: 10,020 (2002)
- Affiliations: ICTU
- Website: batu.ie

The Building and Allied Trades' Union (BATU) is a trade union representing workers in the construction industry and furniture trade in Ireland.

== Forerunners ==
Bricklayers in Dublin appear to have been unionised since at least 1792, and the Old Bodymen was founded in 1802, becoming the Regular Operative Brick and Stonelayers by the 1860s, and the Incorporated Brick and Stonelayers of the City of Dublin in the following decade. In 1888, it registered as the Ancient Guild of Incorporated Brick and Stone Layers Trade Union, although its membership was never large, peaking at 1,367 in 1970.

In 1979, the Irish Union of Woodworkers merged with the Irish Society of Woodcutting Machinists, a small union founded in 1934 with a peak membership of 750, to form the National Union of Woodworkers and Woodcutting Machinists.

== Formation ==
In 1998, the Ancient Guild of Incorporated Brick and Stone Layers' Trade Union merged with the National Union of Wood Workers and Wood Cutting Machinists, to form the new "Building and Allied Trades' Union".

== General secretaries ==
1998: Paddy O'Shaughnessy
2011: Brendan O'Sullivan
