= Thomas Kennedy (Irish politician) =

Irish politician and trade unionist (1887–1947)

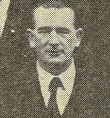

Senator
- In office 8 September 1943 – 18 September 1947
- Constituency: Labour Panel

Senator
- In office 12 December 1934 – 29 May 1936

Personal details
- Born: 1887
- Died: 18 September 1947 (aged 59–60)
- Party: Labour Party
- Children: Fintan Kennedy

Thomas Kennedy (1887 – 18 September 1947) was an Irish Labour Party politician and trade union official.

== Career ==
=== Union leadership ===
From 1905 to 1909, Thomas Kennedy worked as a leather trunk maker in Scotland, where he met James Larkin when Larkin was organising for the NUDL. Then Kennedy returned to Ireland and joined the Socialist Party of Ireland, which was formed in 1904 by the merger of the Irish Socialist Republican Party and the Irish Socialist Labour Party. Kennedy joined the Irish Transport and General Workers' Union (ITGWU) in 1913, which was a union related to the party. After that, Kennedy worked closely with William O'Brien, a member of the leadership in ITGWU and the head of the workers' support committee, and began forty years as William O'Brien's closest political partner.

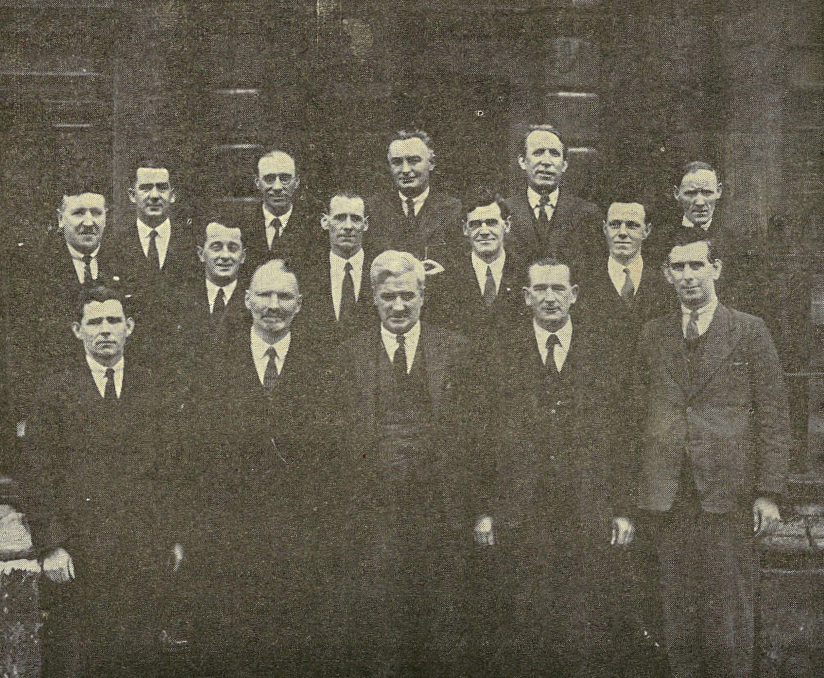
A photo of the ITGWU executive committee in 1933. Kennedy is second from the right in the first row, and O'Brien is second from the left.

Over the next few decades, he became active in trade union affairs and politics. While O'Brien was elected general treasurer of ITGWU in 1918, Kennedy started serving on the Executive Council. In 1919 Kennedy took part in the First Dáil as justice of Dáil Éireann, which was outlawed by the British government, and then elected as member of Dublin Corporation from 1920 to 1924. With the formation of the Irish Free State, O'Brien was elected as Teachta Dála (TD) for Dublin South at the 1922 general election. Kennedy acted as General Treasurer for him, until O'Brien lost his seat at the 1923 general election. In the same year Kennedy was elected as the vice chairman of the Labour Party. Kennedy was also a member of President's Economic Commission in 1928, Finance Committee and Resident Executive. From 1924, Kennedy had entered the center of power in the union leadership as vice president of ITGWU, and general president later in 1939.

=== The Emergency ===
On 1 September 1939, World War II began when Nazi Germany invaded Poland. To keep Ireland neutral, the Emergency Powers Act 1939 was passed, and a state of emergency was declared. It was known as the Emergency, and included censorship of the press and postal correspondence.

During the Emergency, under the influence of O'Brien, the Labour Party and the ITGWU changed their strategy, seeking to align themselves with Taoiseach Éamon de Valera and his Fianna Fáil party, in an attempt to maintain national unity and security, and gradually became more conservative. The ITGWU leadership became increasingly less supportive of workers and protests, sometimes even siding with the government in condemning protesting workers.

To deal with unemployment, de Valera proposed a labour camp scheme in 1940, modeled on the New Deal in United States. In order to promote this plan, the government organised an experiment. They planned to select 200 unemployed workers, mainly from Dublin, to join a labour camp and let them do intensive labour in exchange for wages. The minimum wage in the labour camp was extremely low even at the time, only four shillings a week. In comparison, in 1938, the minimum wage in the Works Progress Administration in the United States' New Deal was $19 per month (about one pound a week at the time), and the average wage in Ireland in 1938 was 54/1 (male) or 45/7 (female) per week. Such low wages and poor living conditions caused the plan to be collectively opposed by workers after it was promulgated. However, Garda quickly dispersed the protesters according to the Offences Against the State Act. Although the ITGWU protested the scheme at the beginning of the movement, they still maintained a compromising and ambiguous attitude. Soon, they no longer supported the protesting workers, but chose to support the government at the behest of O'Brien. Kennedy claimed that the problem of unemployment would have to be dealt with "on the basis of camp life", and urged support for the scheme with O'Brien at the Irish Trades Union Congress (ITUC) executive.

In 1940, de Valera was considering new Trade Unions Act. However, the old law restricting the rights of trade unions was not successfully enacted due to the obstruction of various trade unions, so a government official suggested that de Valera meet with O'Brien and Kennedy, and called them "the better elements of the Irish trade union movement". This showed that even in government's opinion, O'Brien and Kennedy were also relatively conservative and willing to cooperate with the government. After the negotiations with them in 1941, de Valera introduced two bills, the Trade Unions Act 1941 and Emergency Order Power No. 83. The Emergency Order Power No. 83 required employees, employers and unions to stop negotiating over wages, which simply means "freezing wages" so that wages remain unchanged during the state of emergency. The new Trade Unions Act introduced a licensing system, requiring unions to obtain the support of a sufficient number of workers and to pay a large deposit in order to operate in a particular industry. This made it difficult for smaller unions to survive. The licensing system was negotiated between O'Brien and Kennedy and the government to protect the interests of the ITGWU and limit foreign unions, but the deposit system was not negotiated, so Kennedy condemned the new Trade Union Act. However, O'Brien showed a serious attitude of compromise. So when the bill was introduced, O'Brien and the ITGWU leadership limited any discussion against new trade union law. Instead, since O'Brien had made an unsuccessful proposal a few years earlier to rationalise the structure of the Irish Trades Union Congress, he simply condemned Order No. 83 and then called for rationalization again. Influenced by O'Brien, the ITGWU leadership and executive committee members, including Kennedy, eventually compromised on the trade union law. However, Larkin and the WUI played a leading role in the unsuccessful campaign against the bill, led to Larkin's popularity among unions for a period of time afterwards, and the relative decline of the ITGWU and its leadership.

Senior Lecturer in Sociology at University College Dublin Kieran Allen pointed out the reasons why the ITGWU leadership including Kennedy, showed such a compromising attitude. The first is fear of the Garda and the army, which was used by de Valera to break a strike in 1935. The others was the overwhelming popularity of de Valera's neutrality policy among the people, and the common hostility towards British trade unions. During the Emergency, O'Brien believed that the situation after the outbreak of World War II was very similar to the situation in Ireland during World War I. He hoped that Ireland would not repeat the history from the 1916 Easter Rising to the Irish War of Independence in1922. Based on this, the ITGWU leadership showed strong support for de Valera. Kennedy proclaimed that "we in the union are in firm and determined agreement on this neutrality and we will do all in our power in maintaining it", and denounced the war as "an imperialist blood-lust".

=== Labour Party split ===
In the following period, Kennedy became increasingly anti-communist under the influence of O'Brien, and was sometimes even more radical than O'Brien. In 1944, the Labour Party split due to Larkin's return and O'Brien's accusation that the party had become communist, and O'Brien formed the National Labour Party, supported by Kennedy and the conservative leadership of the ITGWU. Later, while Fianna Fáil got an overall majority and National Labour Party lost one seat, Kennedy and McMullen began to look openly to Fianna Fáil but it was rejected by O'Brien. In March 1945, the Council of Irish Unions became a breakaway Congress of Irish Unions (CIU). In the debate over this move in the ITGWU Conference, Kennedy tried to increase support for the split with a bitter anti-communist attack which failed to allay the doubts of many delegates.

In 1946, O'Brien submitted his retirement application to Kennedy, and Kennedy succeeded O'Brien as general secretary.

== Other contributions ==
=== Shannon Scheme ===
At the end of 1923, the engineer Thomas McLaughlin working for Siemens-Schuckert approached the new Irish Free State's Minister for Industry and Commerce Patrick McGilligan with a proposal for a much more ambitious project. With the help of Siemens, the government started the Shannon hydroelectric scheme to build a hydroelectric plant on River Shannon. However, unskilled workers were treated unfairly and were paid very low wages. This led to a collective boycott by workers and unions. The government was accused of playing "fast and loose with established conditions of employment … in their latest outrage on the Shannon banks". It was noted by Labour Party deputies that government ministers who insisted that 32s per week was more than sufficient for a working man to live were themselves, at this time, paid £32 per week. While The Irish Times claimed that there was nothing wrong with the labour conditions on the Shannon Scheme, Kennedy, as ITGWU vice-president in 1925, condemned the Irish Times.

=== 1935 Dublin tram and bus strike ===
In the spring of 1935, nearly 3,000 tram and bus drivers in Dublin went on strike to support a driver who had been dismissed, expressing their long-standing dissatisfaction with low wages. The duration of this strike was unprecedented in Irish history. The strike targeted against the privatization and private monopolies of public transport services, while also demanding the cancellation of wage cuts from 1927 and 1929, extended holidays, higher wages, and improved working conditions for new employees. Kennedy, as the vice-president of the ITGWU took part in organising the strike and criticised the private monopoly of public transport services and said that the tram and bus services should be a state or municipal undertaking.

=== Influence on Seán Lemass ===
According to biographer John Horgan, Kennedy was friendly with Seán Lemass and along with O'Brien and other union leaders, had a profound influence on Lemass' policies, and on Lemass' attention to labour issues.

== Criticism ==
=== Trade union conflict ===
In 1924, when the conflict between James Larkin and O'Brien broke out, the former took a group of ITGWU members and broke away from it to establish a new labour organisation, the Irish Worker League and a new trade union, the Workers' Union of Ireland (WUI). A violent conflict ensued between O'Brien and Larkin, which resulted in 45 workers being imprisoned. In the WUI newspaper The Irish Worker, Larkin called them "O'Brien's victims". Then in a large meeting of the Automobile members of the ITGWU held in the Trades Hall, Capel Street, on Sunday, 15 June, a member of ITGWU James Mitchell gave a brief outline of the inner workings of the union and the many cases he could personally vouch for, where the members' interests were treacherously betrayed. He accused, O'Brien and Kennedy of having supported the Executive Council in defiance of the interests of the members of their own organization.

=== Sexism ===
In 1935, as women's employment increased, the male unemployment rate rose relatively. In order to solve the problem of male unemployment, the government proposed a bill that gave Seán Lemass almost unlimited power, allowing him to ban women from working in industry, while enforcing the ratio of men to women in other categories of industries, requiring employers not to hire more women than men without permission. This bill caused dissatisfaction among women workers and other sympathetic workers. People believed that this law gave the Minister for Industry and Commerce too much power, people had almost no way to appeal, and could even lead to a total ban on women workers. However, at the ITUC's 1935 Congress, held in the Guildhall in Derry, Kennedy argued that "it was the first measure to give male labour their rightful place in the new industries". Helena Molony of the Irish Women Workers' Union (IWWU) responded, telling delegates that "it was terrible to find such reactionary opinions expressed ... by responsible leaders of labour in support of a capitalist minister in setting up a barrier against one set of citizens".

== Seanad and death ==
Kennedy was elected to the Irish Free State Seanad in 1934 for nine years and served until the Free State Seanad was abolished in 1936. He was defeated at the 1938 Seanad election. He was elected to the 4th Seanad Éireann in 1943 by the Labour Panel, and was re-elected at the 1944 Seanad election. He died in office on 18 September 1947.

== Family ==
His son Fintan Kennedy was also a trade union official and senator.

Trade union offices
Preceded by Thomas Foran	General President of the Irish Transport and General Workers' Union; 1939–1946	Succeeded by William McMullen
Preceded by William O'Brien	General Secretary of the Irish Transport and General Workers' Union; 1946–1947	Succeeded by Frank Purcell
Preceded by Gerard Owens	President of the Congress of Irish Unions; 1947	Succeeded by W. J. Whelan
