= 1913 Sligo Dock strike =

The 1913 Sligo Dock strike in the port of Sligo in northwest Ireland was a labour dispute lasting 56 days from 8 March to 6 May 1913. During the strike, there were numerous clashes on the docks and riots in the town, resulting in one fatality. Occurring six months earlier than the Dublin Lockout, it was regarded as a precursor to that action and a successful application of the Irish Transport & General Workers' Union’s strategy for workers' rights by James Larkin and James Connolly. It resulted in victory for the workers. James Larkin considered the 1913 victory in Sligo to be a major achievement of the ITGWU.

== Background to the strike ==
Sligo was a busy port at this time and the dockworkers and sailors were organized into the National Union of Sailors and Fireman and the ITGWU. The ITGWU was stronger in Sligo than anywhere else along the western seaboard. The ITGWU was a radical syndicalist inspired union influenced by the international revolutionary union movements such as the IWW. It aimed to bring about a socialist organization of society and industry through the unionization of labour and using the weapon of the general strike. The county and the port were the most industrialized in Connacht. However, living conditions were terrible in Sligo with high rates of tuberculosis and poor housing. Hence, the town was receptive to Larkins message.

Arthur Jackson of the Sligo Steam Navigation Company, was the chief defender of business interests. Sligo’s labourers had organized in 1911, when an ITGWU speaker, Walter Carpenter, was invited to speak by the trades council. He was denounced as "an imported mischief maker" by Bishop Clancy of Elphin, who instructed Catholics to boycott a meeting addressed by Larkin. A small strike had occurred in 1912 and the unionisation of labour had caught Jackson off guard. He was determined to break the unions grip on labour and set about to provoke a strike, arranging "scab" or "blackleg" labour, liaising with authorities and contacting the Shipping Federation before the strike, which came about in 1913.

== The strike ==
The dispute began on 8 March 1913, when seamen on the SS Sligo demanded more help or higher wages for handling cattle. Their employer, the Sligo Steam Navigation Company, refused their demands. The sailors were members of the National Union of Sailors and Firemen, which had a good relationship with Jim Larkin's Irish Transport and General Workers’ Union (ITGWU). John Lynch, President of the local ITGWU branch was also the local delegate (or shop steward) for the NUSF. Five workers who stopped work were arrested, prosecuted for disobeying a "lawful order" and received seven days’ hard labour. The strike then spread to yards and businesses handling goods in the port, and involved carters and other labourers.

An attempt was made to break the strike by bringing in dockers from Liverpool by the Garvey and Verdon families who were stevedores in the port. 29 of them arrived on 19 March by train. This caused much unrest as fighting erupted between the factions. In one incident, a local union man named Patrick Dunbar was attacked, hit on the head with a shovel and killed, by members of the Garvey family. This escalated the situation considerably and solidified the determination of the workers and their families to continue the strike. The Sligo Champion reported that ‘things have now assumed an aspect which grossly threatens the commercial prosperity of the port and the town generally’. Extra soldiers and police R.I.C. were drafted in. Dozens of strikers were fined and/or imprisoned and in retaliation the property of local firms, including Pollexfen and Company, Harper Campbell Ltd., Suttons, Newsome and Sons, and Messrs Thomas Flanagan were attacked. The union organising a mass meeting in Sligo Town Hall and a boycott of shops that sold goods brought in on company ships, forcing the closure of some businesses. The striking workers received support from the republican priest Fr. Michael O'Flanagan.

== End of strike ==
The death of Dunbar led to offers of arbitration by various parties. A proposal was made to settle the dispute on the basis that:

- Employers could use ‘free labour’ if they chose
- The Verdon-Garvey group could continue working on the Steamship Company quay
- James Verdon could remain a Stevedore agent with the Sligo Steamship Company
- The strike issues would be reviewed
- A joint committee of three members of the Importers’ Association and three representatives of the men would conduct the review within three months
- No strike action would take place while the review took place
- The Review Committee could also review pay and conditions ‘from time to time’

The first point was rejected outright and so the strike continued. The high cost to the ratepayers of maintaining soldiers and police, along with the collapse of trade, eventually led to negotiations under Sir Josslyn Gore Booths agent, JA Cooper, and Alderman John Jinks. Suddenly, on 6 May, Jackson capitulated and an agreement was reached on 6 May that ‘free labour’ would not be employed on the docks, only ITGWU members.

== Legacy ==
The victory boosted the morale of dockers and carters fighting their own battle in Dublin at the time and encouraged the ITGWU in its struggle for workers rights and conditions in Ireland. The struggle and resulting victory implanted a solid tradition of union organization and socialist principles within the working communities of the town. The events of the Dock strike in 1913 are regarded as the foundation stone of the modern socialist and trade union movement in Sligo and the North West. In Sligo employers had a new found respect for the union and the power of organised labour. John Lynch was subsequently elected to the Borough Council. As part of the SIPTU 100 year commemoration of the dock strike a plaque was unveiled at the Sligo SIPTU headquarters and a grave stone was erected to Patrick Dunbar who died in the violent clashes during the strike.
