= Walter Carpenter (socialist) =

English-Irish Socialist, Trade Unionist and Politician

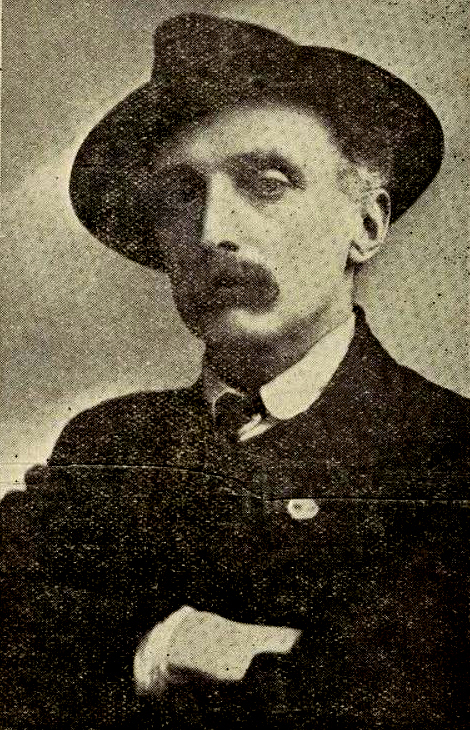
- Carpenter, c. 1914

Personal details
- Born: 3 April 1871; Kent, England, United Kingdom
- Died: 25 February 1926 (aged 54); Dublin, Ireland
- Resting place: Glasnevin Cemetery, Dublin
- Political party: Socialist Party of Ireland
- Spouse: Ellen Walsh
- Children: 9, including Walter Jr. and Peter
- Occupation: Chimney Sweep, Trade Unionist

Walter Carpenter (3 April 1871 – 25 February 1926) was a prominent socialist and trade union organiser active in Ireland in the early 20th century.

== Early life ==
Walter was born in Kent, England on 3 April 1871. He worked as a chimney sweep as had his father before him. By the 1890s he had moved to Dublin in Ireland and had married Ellen Walsh in a Roman Catholic ceremony on 10 June 1894. The couple would go on to have 9 children, 7 of whom survived into adulthood. According to the 1911 census, Walter identified himself as being able to speak both English and Irish. In that same census he also identified himself as a Non-denominational Christian. However, at many other points in his life, he seemed to identify as an atheist.

== Activism and Trade Union organisation ==
He became an organiser for the ITGWU. In 1909 he was a founding member of the Socialist Party of Ireland and, by 1911, he was secretary of the organisation. He was the main speaker at the 1911 founding of the Sligo branch of the union.

In July 1911, he was arrested and jailed for one month, having been found guilty of "using language calculated to lead to a breach of the peace and having endeavoured to degrade the King in the esteem of his subjects". Carpenter, in line with his Republican and Socialist outlook, had denounced monarchism ahead of the forthcoming visit of George V to Dublin. Upon his release, he was greeted by leading figures in Irish left-wing politics at the time such as James Connolly, Helena Molony and Jim Larkin, who had previously paid his bail of £40.

Walter participated in the "Inquiry into the Housing Conditions of the Working Classes of Dublin" which was instigated by Dublin Corporation after tenements had collapsed in Church Street in the city, killing seven people. The corporation itself was a major slum landlord at this time.

Carpenter was a proponent of the Temperance Movement in Ireland, advocating for society to forgo the consumption of alcohol. However, unlike some of his peers at the time, he was not a moraliser and did not attribute the use of alcohol as a moral failing. In fact, he suggested that the only way in which those residing in Dublin's slums could bare such terrible conditions was by "saturating" themselves in alcohol. He also believed that destructive alcoholism was a symptom of poverty, and not the other way around.

In 1913 he became the general secretary of the International Tailors, Machinists and Pressers Trade Union. This union was founded in 1908 by Russian Jewish clothing workers in the city's Little Jerusalem district, and was known colloquially as the "Jewish Union". The union later gave its support to independence, including financial support for "those taking strike action against the movement of war munitions by the British Army of Occupation during 1919". As part of his role as leader of the Union, Carpenter is reputed to have been a fierce opponent of antisemitism.

He was active during the 1913 Dublin Lockout. During the strike, he gave a speech welcoming the release of James Connolly, and another union leader William Partridge from prison. Connolly had been on hunger strike and the two of them had been arrested for "incitement to cause a breach of the peace". In this speech Walter revealed that the city's Chief Magistrate E.G. Swifte, notorious for harsh judgements during the strike and who had earlier jailed Connolly, was himself a shareholder in William Martin Murphy's Dublin United Tram Company.

In 1914, he stood for election during the Dublin Corporation elections, standing in the Fitzwilliam Ward. He received 23% of the vote against a candidate from the United Irish League. His opponent, James Gallagher, used ethnic and sectarian animosity, referring to Carpenter as "non-Irish" and a proponent of "Anti-Christian Socialism". He stood again in the 1920 Dublin municipal elections, but struggled in the now much-expanded field of candidates and because he was neither affiliated with either Sinn Féin nor The Labour Party, the two dominant parties that year.

In 1921 the Socialist Party of Ireland became the Communist Party of Ireland, with Roddy Connolly as its leader and Carpenter as its General Secretary as well as the editor of their newspaper "the Workers Republic". However, by February 1922 he resigned his post as General secretary, citing his trade union commitments.

== Death and legacy ==
He died 25 February 1926 at the age of 54 from heart failure.

Two of Walters oldest sons Walter Patrick Carpenter and Peter Carpenter became members of the Irish Citizen Army and fought in the 1916 Easter Rising. Walter Jr. served in the G.P.O. under the command of James Connolly.

== See also ==
- Dublin Lockout
- 1913 Sligo Dock strike
- Photo of Walter Carpenter (first from right seated)
- Walter Carpenter Free (Full text of speech by James Connolly on the release of Carpenter from Mountjoy in 1911)
