= John Carroll (trade unionist) =

Irish trade unionist (1925–2018)

Senator
- In office 8 October 1981 – 13 May 1982
- Constituency: Nominated by the Taoiseach

Personal details
- Born: 8 January 1925 Dublin, Ireland
- Died: 1 April 2018 (aged 93) Dublin, Ireland
- Party: Labour Party
- Spouse: Mary Catherine (Kitty) Rice
- Children: 2
- Education: Columbia University

John F. Carroll (8 January 1925 – 19 April 2018) was an Irish trade union leader. He was vice-president of the Irish Transport and General Workers' Union (ITGWU) from 1969 to 1981, when he became the union's president until its merger in 1990 with the Federated Workers' Union of Ireland to form the new Services, Industrial, Professional and Technical Union (SIPTU).

John F. Carroll was born in the Ballybough, an inner city district of northeast Dublin. He was the second of four children of John Carroll and his wife May (née Daly). His father worked for Dublin Corporation as a labourer, was an active member of the ITGWU, and had been a former member of the Communist Party of Ireland. John F. married Mary Catherine Rice.

After education at St Canice's national school and the O'Connell School, Carroll passed the examination to enter the Irish Civil Service. However a friend of his mother asked if he would instead work with the ITGWU. He began as a branch assistant, but by 1958 was Head of Industrial Movements, where one of his roles was monitoring wage rates. He gained a diploma in Industrial Engineering from Columbia University in New York City.

A lifelong Labour Party member, Carroll also served briefly as a senator. In 1981, he was nominated by the Taoiseach, Garret FitzGerald as a member of the 15th Seanad. The 15th Seanad was short-lived, and Carroll was not re-appointed in 1982 to the 16th Seanad.

Carroll died on 19 April 2018, aged 93.

Trade union offices
Preceded by Edward Browne ?	Vice-President of the Irish Transport and General Workers' Union; 1969–1981	Succeeded by Christy Kirwan
Preceded by Fintan Kennedy	President of the Irish Transport and General Workers' Union; 1981–1990	Office abolished
Preceded by Jim McCusker	President of the Irish Congress of Trade Unions; 1987	Succeeded by William Wallace
