= John McDonnell (trade unionist) =

Irish former trade union leader (born 1943)

John McDonnell (born 1943) is an Irish former trade union leader.

Born in Mallow, County Cork, McDonnell began working in the local Érin Foods factory. He joined the Irish Transport and General Workers' Union (ITGWU), and in 1974 was elected as secretary of his local branch. He focused on supporting union members in the food processing, local authority and health industries, and gradually came to national prominence. In his spare time, he completed a degree in economic and history with University College Cork.

The ITGWU became part of SIPTU in 1990, and McDonnell was appointed as its south west regional officer, the largest region in the union.

McDonnell stood to become general secretary of SIPTU in 1997, defeating Brendan Hayes and Carolann Duggan. Along with Hayes, he was considered part of the "mainstream" of the union. The first leader of SIPTU to be elected when not living in Dublin, McDonnell benefited from an 80% turnout among members in his south west region, but also won in some other areas, such as many Dublin branches.

As leader, McDonnell prioritised expanding the social partnership programme, believing that the unions could win more concessions, such as a £5 minimum wage and mandatory union recognition. Because SIPTU, at the time, expected leaders to retire when they reached the age of sixty, he committed from the start to serving a single five-year term.

In 2001, McDonnell was additionally elected as treasurer of the Irish Congress of Trade Unions (ICTU). After retiring from his union posts in 2003, the ICTU nominated him to serve on the board of Fáilte Ireland, the tourism development agency.

Trade union offices
Preceded by Bill Attley	General Secretary of SIPTU; 1998–2003	Succeeded by Joe O'Flynn
Preceded by Jimmy Somers	Treasurer of the Irish Congress of Trade Unions; 2001–2003	Succeeded by Joe O'Flynn
