= John Conroy (trade unionist) =

Irish trade unionist (19041969)

John Conroy (17 April 1904 – 13 February 1969) was an Irish trade union leader.

Born in Wicklow, he was the son of Thomas Conroy, a railway signalman, and Catherine Conroy (née McNamara). He started work early and held a variety of jobs until, in 1923, he was employed by the Irish Transport and General Workers' Union (ITGWU) as their full-time organiser in Wicklow. Although he and a colleague were charged with conspiracy, they were found not guilty, and Conroy continued his union career. After a period working in Limerick, he moved to Dublin to take charge of the union's Industrial Section. He served as ITGWU vice-president from 1946 to 1953 and general president from 1953 to 1959 and 1968 to 1969.

As President of the union, Conroy focused on a programme of modernisation, along with campaigning for a national minimum wage. He also worked with James Larkin Jnr, to promote the merger of the Irish Trades Union Congress and the Congress of Irish Unions, which was accomplished with the founding of the Irish Congress of Trade Unions in 1959.

This accomplished, Conroy served as the first president of the new organisation, and discussed a merger of the ITGWU with Larkin's Workers' Union of Ireland, although this did not occur until many years later.

== Family ==
Conroy had two daughters by his first marriage. His second wife, whom he married in 1959, was Sheila Williams, a hotel and restaurant worker. A prominent ITGWU activist, she was the first woman to sit on the union's national executive (1955–59). They had no children.

== Death ==
Conroy died 13 February 1969, aged 64, in the Adelaide Hospital, Dublin, after an illness, and was buried in Deans Grange Cemetery.

Trade union offices
Preceded by William McMullen	General President of the Irish Transport and General Workers' Union; 1953–1969	Succeeded by Fintan Kennedy
Preceded by Michael Colgan	President of the Congress of Irish Unions; 1951	Succeeded by Walter Beirne
New office	President of the Irish Congress of Trade Unions; 1959	Succeeded by James Larkin Jnr
Preceded by Walter Beirne	Treasurer of the Irish Congress of Trade Unions; 1960–1967	Succeeded by Fintan Kennedy
Preceded by Bob Thompson	President of the Irish Congress of Trade Unions; 1968	Succeeded by Jimmy Dunne
