= Michael Colgan (politician) =

Irish politician and trade unionist (died 1953)

Senator
- In office 21 April 1948 – 22 June 1953
- In office 8 September 1943 – 18 August 1944
- Constituency: Labour Panel

Personal details
- Died: 22 June 1953
- Party: Independent; National Labour Party

Michael Colgan (died 22 June 1953) was an Irish independent politician and trade union official. He was a member of Seanad Éireann from 1943 to 1944 and from 1948 to 1953. He was first elected to the 4th Seanad in 1943 by the Labour Panel.

He stood unsuccessfully for Dáil Éireann as an National Labour Party candidate for the Dublin North-East constituency at the 1944 general election, and also lost his seat at the 1944 Seanad election. He was re-elected to the Seanad in 1948 and in 1951 again by the Labour Panel. He died in office in June 1953.

He was the president of the Irish Trades Union Congress in 1942, and president of the Congress of Irish Unions in 1950.

Trade union offices
New office	General Secretary of the Irish Bookbinders' and Allied Trades Union; 1920–1953	Succeeded by Terence Farrell
Preceded by William O'Brien	President of the Irish Trades Union Congress; 1942	Succeeded by Michael Keyes
Preceded by Owen Hynes	President of the Congress of Irish Unions; 1950	Succeeded by John Conroy
