= Jack O'Connor (trade unionist) =

Irish trade unionist

Chairman of the Labour Party
- Incumbent
- Assumed office 23 April 2017
- Leader: Brendan Howlin
- Preceded by: Loraine Mulligan

General President of SIPTU
- In office 6 September 2003 – 14 December 2017
- Preceded by: Des Geraghty
- Succeeded by: Position abolished

President of ICTU
- In office 9 July 2009 – 26 October 2011
- Preceded by: Patricia McKeown
- Succeeded by: Eugene McGlone

Personal details
- Born: 24 January 1957 (age 69) Dublin, Ireland
- Party: Labour Party

Jack O'Connor (born 24 January 1957) is an Irish trade unionist who has served as Chairman of the Labour Party since April 2017. He previously served as General President of SIPTU from 2003 to 2017 and President of ICTU from 2009 to 2011.

Jack O'Connor (right) is presented with a painting of James Connolly by Sinn Féin Dáil leader Caoimhghín Ó Caoláin to mark the 100th anniversary of SIPTU

== Background ==
Born in northern County Dublin, O'Connor worked in various fields before taking full-time employment with the Federated Workers' Union of Ireland in 1980. In 1990, the union became part of SIPTU, and O'Connor was appointed as its regional organiser for the Midlands.

== Trade Unionism ==
In 2000, O'Connor became Vice President of SIPTU, and in 2003 he was elected as General President. O'Connor stepped down as General President on 14 December 2017 after completing three terms in the role.

He was appointed to the executive of the Irish Congress of Trade Unions in 2001, becoming Vice President in 2007 and President in 2009. He is also active in the Labour Party and has served on its executive.

== Labour Party activities ==
At the 2017 Labour Party annual Conference, O'Connor was elected as Party Chairperson, succeeding fellow SIPTU official Lorainne Mulligan. O'Connor was elected unopposed.

On 4 April 2018, O'Connor was selected as the party's general election candidate for Wicklow, however he stepped down as the candidate in September 2019, upon which Paul O'Brien was selected to run instead.

Trade union offices
Preceded by Des Geraghty	General President of SIPTU; 2003–2017	Succeeded by Position abolished
Preceded by Patricia McKeown	President of the Irish Congress of Trade Unions; 2009–2011	Succeeded by Eugene McGlone
