= Electrical Trades Union (Ireland) =

- Predecessor: Irish Engineering Industrial Union
- Merged into: Technical Engineering and Electrical Union
- Founded: 1923
- Dissolved: 2001
- Headquarters: 5 Cavendish Row, Dublin
- Location: Ireland
- Members: 11,533 (1991)
- Affiliations: ICTU

The Electrical Trades Union was a trade union representing electrical technicians and engineers in Ireland.

The union was founded in 1923 when the electrical section of the Irish Engineering Industrial Union split away. Initially, it was named the Electrical Trades Union (Dublin), but became the Electrical Trades Union (Ireland) in 1925. It joined the Irish Trades Union Congress, then joined the group of unions which formed the rival Congress of Irish Unions.

The union was initially very small, with only 240 members in 1930, but grew to 1,000 in 1940. From the 1960s onwards, the union began accepting workers in a wide variety of jobs only loosely connecting with electrical matters, and this enabled it to expand its membership above 6,000 by 1970. In 1974, the British Electrical Trades Union became part of the Electrical, Electronic, Telecommunications and Plumbing Union, and the Irish union took the opportunity to drop the disambiguator from its own name, officially becoming the "Electrical Trades Union" for this first time.

In 2001, the union merged with the National Engineering and Electrical Trade Union to form the Technical Engineering and Electrical Union (since named Connect).

== General Secretaries ==
1923: Seán Duffy
1920s: Patrick Keogh
c.1930: J. M. O'Duffy
1933: Gerry Owens
1950: Patrick Keogh
1957: George Lynch
1966: James McConway
1969: Thomas Heery
1985: Frank O'Reilly
