= Irish Graphical Society =

Trade union in Dublin, Ireland

Constitution of the Dublin Typographical Provident Society

The Irish Graphical Society was a trade union representing workers in the printing trades in Dublin.

The union was founded in 1809 as the Dublin Typographical Provident Society. It gradually increased in membership, reaching 900 in the 1890s, and 1,200 in the 1950s, by which time it included both skilled and semi-skilled workers.

It had its headquarters at 33 Little Denmark Street for a period.

In 1963, the union renamed itself as the "Irish Graphical Society", but still only represented workers in Dublin, workers in the industry elsewhere in Ireland joining the Typographical Association and its successor, the National Graphical Association (NGA). However, the NGA merged with some small unions in Dublin during the 1960s, and attempted to recruit further members in the city, resulting in demarcation disputes between the two unions. In 1983, the society merged with the Electrotypers' and Stereotypers' Society of Dublin and District and the Irish Bookbinders' and Allied Trades Union, forming the Irish Print Union; this ultimately joined the Services Industrial Professional Technical Union in 1998.

== General Secretaries ==
c.1900: Joseph Nannetti
1915: Michael O'Flanagan
1921: W. J. Whelan
1960: Nicholas McGrath
1975: Owen A. Curran
