= Stonecutters' Union of Ireland =

The Stonecutters' Union of Ireland (SUI) was a trade union representing stonemasons in Ireland.

The union was founded in 1894 as the Operative Stonecutters of Ireland. It was originally based in Cork, but in 1902 it absorbed the City of Dublin Stonecutters, and then moved its headquarters to Dublin. In 1918, it affiliated to the Irish Transport and General Workers' Union, but it became independent again in 1925. In 1933, it joined the Irish Trades Union Congress. In 1942, it was a founding affiliate of the Building Workers' Trade Union, but it disaffiliated in 1962. In 1965, the Workers' Union of Ireland accepted a proposal for the SUI to merge in, but in 1966 the union instead merged into the Ancient Guild of Incorporated Brick Layers' Trade Union. Always a small union, its membership peaked at 660 in 1900, but by 1966 had fallen to 157.

The union's most prominent leader was Thomas Farren, who served as general secretary from 1912 to 1918.
