= Mandate (trade union) =

- Mandate Trade Union
- Founded: 1994
- Headquarters: O'Lehane House, Cavendish Row, Dublin
- Location: Ireland
- Members: 40,000 (2005)
- Key people: Lorraine O’Brien, General Secretary
- Publication: Shopfloor
- Affiliations: ICTU
- Website: www.mandate.ie

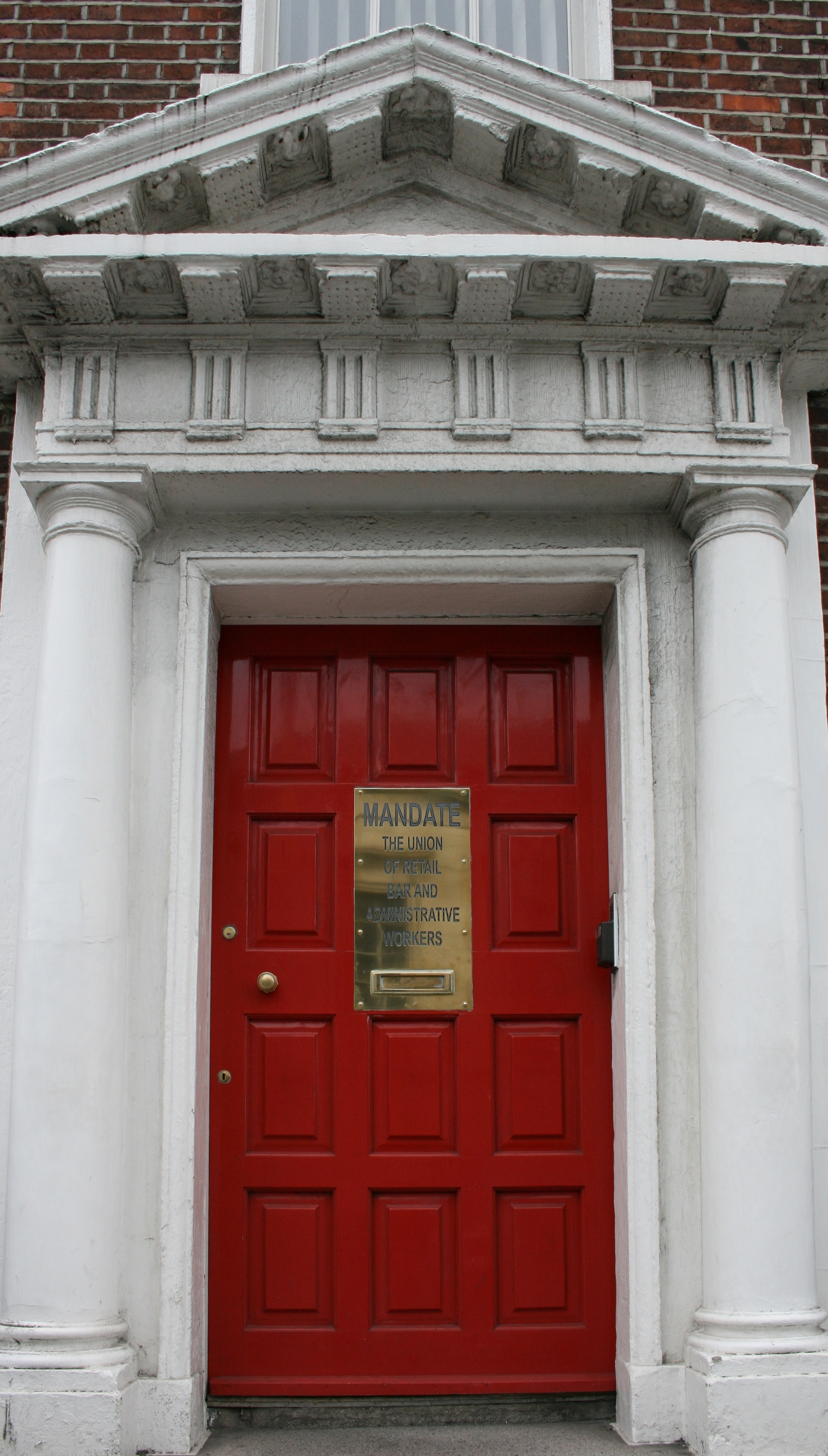
Door to home of "Mandate - The Union of Retail, Bar and Administrative Workers" in Dublin

Mandate is a trade union representing retail, administrative and distributive workers in Ireland.

The union was founded in 1994, when the Irish Distributive and Administrative Trade Union merged with the Irish National Union of Vintners', Grocers' and Allied Trades Assistants. The merger was criticised by some members because the word "union" was not contained in the title. Later, the union was renamed "Mandate Trade Union".

On formation, the union had 22,000 members, and this grew to 40,000 by 2005. Due to the turnover of staff in retail, at the time, it was recruiting around 16,000 members per year in order to maintain this level of total membership.

A new logo was designed in 2009.

In 2020 and 2021, Mandate members at Debenhams Ireland took part in a lengthy industrial dispute with their former employer, campaigning for four weeks' redundancy pay per year of service as had been agreed under a 2016 collective agreement.

== General Secretaries ==
1994: Owen Nulty
2005: John Douglas
2020: Gerry Light
2023-2024: Jonathan Hogan Interim General Secretary.
2024: Lorraine O’Brien
