= Connect (Irish trade union) =

- Predecessor: Electrical Trades Union and National Engineering and Electrical Trade Union
- Founded: 2001
- Headquarters: 6 Gardiner Row, Dublin
- Location: Ireland
- Members: 45,000 (2016)
- Publication: Fusion
- Affiliations: ICTU
- Website: connectunion.ie

Connect is a trade union representing construction, electrical, and technical workers in Ireland.

== History ==
The union came into existence in 2001, when it was named the Technical Engineering and Electrical Union (TEEU). It arose from an amalgamation between the Electrical Trades Union and the National Engineering and Electrical Trade Union. Both unions could trace their origins to 1920 when union activists in British based unions believed Irish workers needed autonomous representation in the emerging Irish state.

In 2016, members of the Union of Construction, Allied Trades and Technicians based in Ireland transferred to the TEEU. In 2018, the union changed its name to "Connect".

== Remit ==
The union represents a broad range of workers throughout industry and public service. It includes craftworkers, technicians, skilled operatives, general workers, technical, administration, and supervisory staff.

The TEEU is the largest engineering union in Ireland and the second largest in manufacturing, representing up to 40,000 workers.

== General Secretaries ==
1997: Owen Wills
2010: Eamon Devoy
2016: Paddy Kavanagh
