= W. J. Whelan (union leader) =

William J. Whelan (1887 – 13 March 1960) was an Irish trade union leader.

Born in Dublin, Whelan was the son of Patrick Whelan, who had fought with the Union Army during the American Civil War. He was educated at a Christian Brothers School, then completed an apprenticeship as a printer before working on the Irish Weekly Independent (successor of The Nation), followed by the Irish Daily Independent.

In 1909, Whelan attended the meeting which refounded the Dublin Typographical Provident Society as a trade union. In 1921, he left the Independent to become general secretary of the union. He took the union into the new Congress of Irish Unions, serving as president of Congress in 1948, then took part in the negotiations which merged it into the Irish Congress of Trade Unions.

Whelan announced that he would retire in June 1960, but he died in March that year. Under his leadership, membership of the union had increased from 900 to 1,500, all in the city of Dublin, and the union built up large financial reserves.

Trade union offices
Preceded by Michael O'Flanagan	General Secretary of the Dublin Typographical Provident Society; 1921–1960	Succeeded by Nicholas McGrath
Preceded by Thomas Kennedy	President of the Congress of Irish Unions; 1948	Succeeded by Owen Hynes
