= Leo Crawford =

Irish trade unionist (1903-1973)

- Born: 1903; Dublin, Ireland
- Died: May 1973 (aged 69–70)
- Occupation: Trade unionist

Leo Crawford (1903 – May 1973) was an Irish trade unionist.

Born in Dublin, Crawford was educated at a Christian Brothers school. He left at 15 to become a plasterer and joined the Operative Plasterers Trades Society. The following year, his union undertook a lengthy strike; unable to support himself, he emigrated to England to find work until the strike was over.

Crawford spent a further period in England in the mid-1920s, but by the 1930s was back in Ireland and became increasingly prominent in the trade union movement. He became a full-time official, and served as President of the Dublin Council of Trade Unions in 1939. In the same year, he was elected as President of the Operative Plasterers, serving for ten years. This union was a founder member of the Congress of Irish Unions, and Crawford served as its Secretary from 1946. In this role, he negotiated a merger between it and the rival Irish Trades Union Congress, the two amalgamating in 1959 to form the Irish Congress of Trade Unions (ICTU). He stood for election to the Seanad Éireann in 1951, but was not successful.

Crawford was joint secretary of the ICTU until his retirement in 1966.

Trade union offices
Preceded by Cathal O'Shannon	General Secretary of the Congress of Irish Unions; 1946–1959	Succeeded by Position abolished
Preceded by James Larkin Jnr	General Secretary of the Irish Congress of Trade Unions; 1959–1966; With: Ruaidhri Roberts	Succeeded by Ruaidhri Roberts
