= Joe Cunningham (trade unionist) =

Irish trade unionist

Joe Cunningham is an Irish trade union leader.

Born in Galway, Cunningham worked for Lydon House, a local catering and events company. He joined the Workers' Union of Ireland, and became a shop steward, then won election to the union's western area branch committee, before becoming the union's full-time official for the West.

In 1990, the union became part of the new Services, Industrial, Professional and Technical Union (SIPTU), with Cunningham covering the Midland counties, then becoming regional secretary for the Western region, later moving to the Northern region. In 2010, he was appointed as head of the union's Strategic Organising Department.

In 2020, Cunningham was elected as general secretary of the union, with his early period in office dominated by the COVID-19 pandemic. As leader of the union, he proposed that the government should borrow to invest in housing, health and education.

Trade union offices
Preceded by Joe O'Flynn	General Secretary of SIPTU; 2020–present	Incumbent
Preceded by Joe O'Flynn	Treasurer of the Irish Congress of Trade Unions; 2019–present	Incumbent
