= Walter Beirne =

Irish trade union leader

Walter Herbert Beirne (4 September 1907 – 29 October 1959) was an Irish trade union leader.

Born in Newbridge, County Kildare, the son of Patrick Joseph Beirne, a sergeant with the Royal Irish Constabulary, and Margaret Mary Catherine Clinch, Beirne was educated at Newbridge College before becoming an assistant in a grocery. He joined the Irish National Union of Vintners', Grocers' and Allied Trades Assistants (INUVGATA), and soon began working full-time for the union as a clerk. In 1937, after only two years, he was appointed as the union's general secretary, initially focusing on improving its financial position. He arranged for Banba Hall, belonging to the union, to be rebuilt, and the larger hall was frequently hired out to raise money.

Beirne became active in the Labour Party, standing in Dublin South at the 1943 and 1944 Irish general elections. He narrowly missed election on both occasions; on one, by only two votes on the final count. He was elected to Dublin Corporation, serving for three years.

Beirne took INUVGATA into the breakaway Congress of Irish Unions, of which he served as president in 1952. Congress became part of the Irish Congress of Trade Unions, and Beirne was elected as its first treasurer.

In his spare time, Beirne was a founder of the Catholic Workers' College, served on the Transport Tribunal, and was a director of Irish Shipping.

Trade union offices
Preceded by V. J. Forde	General Secretary of the Irish National Union of Vintners', Grocers' and Allied Trades Assistants; 1937–1959	Succeeded by James Candon
Preceded by John Conroy	President of the Congress of Irish Unions; 1952	Succeeded by William McMullen
Preceded by New position	Treasurer of the Irish Congress of Trade Unions; 1959	Succeeded by John Conroy
