= Joe O'Flynn =

Joe O'Flynn is an Irish trade union leader and former politician.

Born in the Fairhill area of Cork, O'Flynn joined a trade union when he was sixteen, and began working for it full-time six years later.

O'Flynn was active in the Labour Party, and was elected to Cork City Council in 1991. He stood in the 1994 Cork South-Central by-election, but took only 6.2% of the first preference votes, and was not elected. He served as Lord Mayor of Cork in 1998/1999.

Meanwhile, O'Flynn's union career continued to develop. He served as National Industrial Officer and then a Regional Officer of what became SIPTU. In 2002, he was elected as the union's general secretary. The following year, he was elected as treasurer of the Irish Congress of Trade Unions. He also served on Bord Gais Eireann.

Civic offices
Preceded by Dave McCarthy	Lord Mayor of Cork; 1998–1999	Succeeded by Damian Wallace
Trade union offices
Preceded by John McDonnell	General Secretary of SIPTU; 2002–2020	Succeeded by Joe Cunningham
Preceded by John McDonnell	Treasurer of the Irish Congress of Trade Unions; 2003–2019	Succeeded by Joe Cunningham
