= Irish Seamen and Port Workers' Union =

Irish trade union

- Merged into: SIPTU
- Founded: 1933
- Dissolved: 1999
- Location: Ireland

The Irish Seamen and Port Workers' Union, an Irish trade union, was founded in 1933.

Irish seamen were previously represented by the British-based National Sailors' and Firemen's Union (NSFU) (led by the right-wing Havelock Wilson) and other unions. However the NSFU (which changed its name to the National Union of Seamen in 1926) fell into disrepute by its failure to observe the General Strike in 1926, among other things, and in September 1928 the NSFU was officially expelled from the Trades Union Congress.

From the outset the Irish Seamen and Port Workers' Union campaigned for the establishment of an Irish Maritime Board, in opposition to the National Maritime Board (a bilateral board governing wages and working practices in the British shipping industry). The Irish Maritime Board was set up on 15 October 1948.

In 1951, the union had a victory in a wage claim, having rejected an initial Labour Court Recommendation. Around that time Des Branigan, seaman, archaeological diver and maritime historian, appeared on the scene and became involved in agitation dealing with Irish Shipping and the Irish Seamen and Port Workers’ Union, among others.

The union changed its name to the Marine, Port and General Workers Union (MPGWU) in 1955. In doing so, it hoped to focus on its shore-based members, particularly dockers. With the encouragement of the Congress of Irish Unions (CIU), in 1957 it formed the Irish Seamen's Union, which it hoped that the sailors in its membership would join. However, the new union was accused of being corrupt, and of being controlled by companies and political parties. The union was a failure, and was dissolved in 1959, its members and other seamen in the MPGWU leaving to form the new Seamen's Union of Ireland.

The MPGWU followed the CIU into the new Irish Congress of Trade Unions in 1959, but it left in 1970. Its membership declined, falling to only 3,114 in 1989. In 1999, it merged into SIPTU.

== General Secretaries ==
1934: Joseph Ellis
1940: Seán O'Moore
1944: John Kelly
1952: Patrick Costelloe
1954: Desmond Brannigan
1957: William Donoghue
1957: James Dunne
1971: Frank Ellis
1973: Séamus Redmond
1991: Michael Hayes
