= 1914 Dublin Corporation election =

Local election in Ireland

An election of 79 of the members of the Dublin Corporation took place on Thursday 15 January 1914 as part of that year's Irish local elections.

Prior to the election, Dublin experienced a major industrial dispute, the Dublin Lock-out, and the election saw the newly created Labour Party emerge as the council's second party.

The Dublin Corporaton had 80 seats, but this election left one council seat vacant.

== Council composition following election ==
Party	Seats	±	Votes	%	±%
Irish Nationalist	56	▼6			
Labour	9	▲7			
Irish Unionist	5	▼5			
Independent	5	▲3			
Sinn Féin	4	▼1			
Totals	79			100.0	—

== Ward results ==
=== Fitzwilliam Ward ===
==== Councillor ====
Fitzwilliam Ward Electorate: 2,108
Party	Candidate	Votes	%	±%
United Irish League	Mr J. M. Gallagher (incumbent)	939	77.22	
Ind. Socialist	Mr Walter Carpenter	277	22.78	
Majority		662	54.44	
Turnout		1,216	57.69	
United Irish League hold		Swing		

=== Mountjoy Ward ===
==== Alderman ====
Mountjoy Ward Electorate: 3,652
Party	Candidate	Votes	%	±%
Irish Nationalist	Mr J. J. Farrell (incumbent)	1,350		
Labour	Arthur Murphy	975		
Majority		375		
Turnout				
Irish Nationalist hold		Swing		

==== Councillor ====
Mountjoy Ward Electorate: 3,652
Party	Candidate	Votes	%	±%
Irish Nationalist	Rt. Hon. Lorcan Sherlock (incumbent Lord Mayor)	1,672		
Labour	J. J. Campbell	716		
Majority		956		
Turnout				
Irish Nationalist hold		Swing		

=== New Kilmainham ===
==== Councillor ====
The ward was previously held by Thomas O'Hanlon, a Labour member, however O'Hanlon was unable to be nominated due to not appearing on the electoral register.

New Kilmainham Ward Electorate: 1,545
Party	Candidate	Votes	%	±%
Irish Labour	Henry Donnelly	617	59.04	
	Joseph Gleeson	417	39.90	
	Patrick Joseph McIntyre (withdrew)	11	1.05	
Majority		200		
Turnout		1,045		
Irish Labour hold		Swing		

=== South City Ward ===
==== Councillor ====
South City Ward Electorate: 985
Party	Candidate	Votes	%	±%
Home Ruler	Andrew Beattie D.L. (incumbent)	337		
Ind. Nationalist	Timothy Joseph Sheil	333		
Majority		4		
Turnout		670		
Home Ruler hold		Swing		

=== Trinity ===
==== Councillor ====
Trinity Ward Electorate: 1,852
Party	Candidate	Votes	%	±%
Irish Labour	William Chase	667	61.93	
United Irish League	Francis Cole	410	38.07	
Majority		257	23.86	N/A
Turnout		1,077		
Irish Labour gain from Irish Nationalist		Swing		

=== Wood Quay Ward ===
==== Councillor ====
Wood Quay Ward Electorate: 3,869
Party	Candidate	Votes	%	±%
United Irish League	Peter O'Reilly (incumbent)	1,332		
Irish Labour	Thomas Irwin	1,089		
Majority		243		
Turnout				
United Irish League hold		Swing		
