= Irish National Painters' and Decorators' Trade Union =

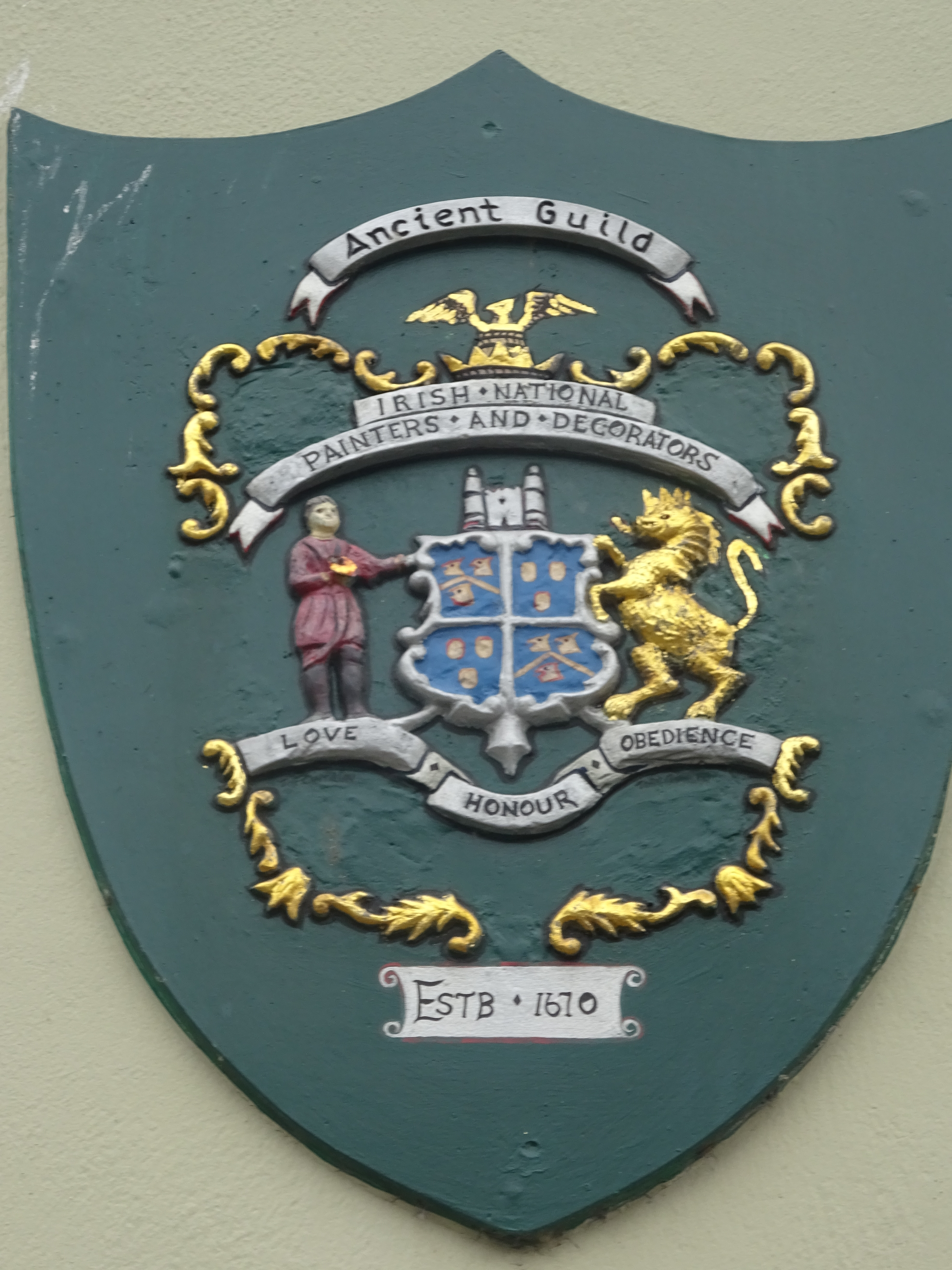
Arms

The Irish National Painters' and Decorators' Trade Union (INPDTU) was a trade union representing painters and decorators in Ireland.

The union originated in the 19th century as the Regular Operative House Painters' Society. In 1890, it was renamed as the Dublin Metropolitan House Painters; although it was de-registered in 1906, it appears to have continued in existence and re-registered in 1911. Membership at this time was low, peaking at 600 in 1897 and 1899.

In 1918, the union became the Irish National Painters', Decorators' and Allied Trades Union, for the first time accepting members outside Dublin. It affiliated to the Building Workers' Trade Union in 1924, but left again in 1942, and shortened its name to the "Irish National Painters' and Decorators' Trade Union" in 1926. In 1936, the Dublin Whiteners' Trade Union merged in, while in 1966 both the Cork House Painters' Trade Union and Limerick Operative House Painters' Society joined.

The union became part of the Services, Industrial, Professional and Technical Union in 1991.
