= William McMullen (politician) =

Irish trade unionist and politician (1888–1982)

- McMullen, c. 1959

Senator
- In office 25 February 1953 – 1 September 1953
- In office 14 August 1951 – 16 September 1952
- Constituency: Labour Panel

Member of the Northern Ireland Parliament for Belfast West
- In office April 1925 – May 1929

Personal details
- Born: 22 July 1888 Belfast, County Antrim, Ireland
- Died: 12 December 1982 (aged 94) Dublin, Ireland
- Party: Northern Ireland Labour Party; Irish Labour Party
- Spouse: Annie Mullen
- Children: 3

William McMullen (22 July 1888 – 12 December 1982) was an Irish trade unionist and politician. A member of the Labour movement, McMullen primary work was a trade unionist, but he was also a successful politician who secured office in the Parliament of Northern Ireland. Despite coming from a Presbyterian family, McMullen was also an avowed Irish republican, bitterly opposing the partition of Ireland in the 1920s and joining the Republican Congress in the 1930s. In the 1940s McMullen became the leader of the Irish Transport and General Workers' Union and in the 1950s, he became a member of the Irish senate.

== Early life ==
Born into a Presbyterian family in Belfast, McMullen began working in the shipyards and became an active trade unionist. In 1907 he met James Larkin during the 1907 carters' strike in Belfast. While working at the Harland and Wolff shipyard in 1910 he met James Connolly and was thereafter Connolly's most prominent supporter in Belfast, acting as the first Chairman of the Independent Labour Party in the city. Because of this move into radical politics, McMullen was unable to find work in Belfast and in 1914 he emigrated to the Britain.

However, McMullen returned to Ireland in 1920 and resumed political activity. He had intended to stand in the 1921 Northern Ireland general election as a Belfast Labour Party candidate, however, Labour made the decision to mostly withdraw from the election in order to make way for Sinn Féin. The Belfast Labour Party was dissolved in 1924 and McMullen was a founding member of its successor, the Northern Ireland Labour Party on 8 March 1924. That same year, McMullen successfully became a poor law guardian in the Catholic ward of Smithfield.

== Member of the Northern Irish parliament ==
In 1925 McMullen was successful in two elections, firstly he became a member of Belfast Corporation and then at the 1925 Northern Ireland general election, McMullen stood in Belfast West for the Northern Ireland Labour Party. Despite coming bottom of the poll, he was elected on transfers from Joe Devlin, the only Nationalist Party candidate. In Parliament, he was fiercely critical of the partition of Ireland and he challenged the Ulster Unionist Party over unemployment. In 1928, he joined the rest of the party in walking out, earning themselves suspensions from the body.

Between 1927 and 1928, he was the President of the Irish Trades Union Congress.

Following the restructuring of constituencies, McMullen stood in Belfast Falls in 1929. The Nationalist Party stood Richard Byrne, a publican and landlord. Devlin offered to secure McMullen a seat in the Senate of Northern Ireland should he stand down, but McMullen refused the offer. He produced a newspaper, the Northern Worker, claiming that Byrne was a slum landlord. Byrne secured an injunction to stop distribution two days before the election and beat McMullen by around 1,400 votes. McMullen's loss can be partly attributable to the fact that proportional representation in Northern Ireland was ended after 1925, forcing most candidates to run on either explicitly Catholic or Protestant lines.

== Continued political activism ==
McMullen continued to be politically active after the loss of his seat in parliament. In late 1932, Catholics and Protestants began to riot alongside each other in Belfast during the "outdoor relief disturbances"; "outdoor relief" was a form of welfare and the Great Depression meant access to welfare was desperately in need. McMullen was an active part of the disturbances, leading strikes and marches to demand "a living wage".

In June 1934 McMullen stood in a by-election for a seat in Belfast Central, but was not successful, placing second behind Thomas Joseph Campbell. McMullen lost by 14%, and as it happens, 14% of the vote in that by-election went to Labour man Harry Diamond.

In September 1934, McMullen was a founding member of the Republican Congress, an attempt by left-wing Irish republicans outside of Fianna Fáil to create a unified front. However, the party was immediately racked by ideological infighting and dissipated almost as soon as it had started.

== Trade union leader ==
In 1937 McMullen moved to Dublin to take up a post as the national organiser of the Irish Transport and General Workers' Union; in 1939 he became vice-president and in 1946 he became the ITGWU's President.

== Irish senator ==
After the 1951 Irish general election he was elected to Seanad Éireann on the Labour Panel as a member of the Republic's Labour Party. He was declared bankrupt in the High Court on 16 September 1952, which ipso facto vacated his seat, despite his having promptly discharged his bankruptcy. He was returned unopposed on 4 February 1953 in the by-election to fill the vacancy. On 1 September 1953 he resigned to join the board of Córas Iompair Éireann.

Parliament of Northern Ireland
Preceded by Thomas Henry Burn; Joseph Devlin; Philip James Woods; Robert Lynn	Member of Parliament for Belfast West; 1925–1929; With: Joseph Devlin; Philip James Woods; Robert Lynn	Constituency abolished
Party political offices
Preceded by Sam Kyle	Chair of the Northern Ireland Labour Party; 1925–1927	Succeeded by Matthew Courtney
Trade union offices
Preceded by J. T. O'Farrell	President of the Irish Trades Union Congress; 1928	Succeeded by Luke Duffy
Preceded by Thomas Kennedy	President of the Irish Transport and General Workers' Union; 1946–1953	Succeeded by John Conroy
Preceded by Walter Beirne	President of the Congress of Irish Unions; 1953	Succeeded by Gerald Doyle
