= John Lawlor (trade unionist) =

Irish Handball player

John Lawlor (1860–1929), was an Irish handball player, and trade unionist. Born in Pennsylvania, USA, in 1860, he returned with his parents to Ireland, which was then part of the United Kingdom, in 1862. In 1884 he became the Irish Professional Handball Champion. He moved to America where he played handball professionally. Married to Alice, they had a son John while in America.

He set up a Cab company in Broadstone, Dublin, and joined the Cab Drivers and Owners Union. In 1915 he became vice-president of the Dublin Trades Council and Labour League and in 1916 he became president of the Dublin Council of Trade Unions, he served on Dublin Corporation from 1920 to 1924 for the Inns Quay, Dublin, elected as a Labour candidate. He was president of the Workers' Union of Ireland from 1924 until his death in 1929. Lawlor stood for election unsuccessfully in 1923 in Dublin North for the Dublin Trades Council, and September 1927 in Dublin South as an Independent Labour Candidate.

In 1924 he became the first president of the Irish Amateur Handball Association (IAWA).

He died in 1929 and is buried in Glasnevin, his friend political associate Jim Larkin gave his funeral oration.

He is remembered along with his opponent Phil Casey for the early world handball championships, in the Casey/Lawlor Cup.
