= Building Workers' Trade Union =

The Building Workers' Trade Union (BWTU) was a trade union in Ireland.

The union was founded in 1942, with the aim of bringing together construction unions, in part due to the expectation that requirements of the Trade Union Act 1941 would mean only one union would be permitted to formally negotiate for the industry. It brought together seven unions:

- Ancient Guild of Incorporated Brick Layers' Trade Union
- Irish National Painters' and Decorators' Trade Union
- Irish National Union of Woodworkers
- Limerick City Guild of Carpenters and Joiners
- Limerick Operative House Painters
- Stonecutters' Union of Ireland
- United Operative House and Ship Painters' and Decorators' Trade Union of Ireland

It initially affiliated to the Irish Trade Union Congress, but in 1945 joined the Congress of Irish Unions split. From 1959, it was affiliated to the new Irish Congress of Trade Unions. Membership peaked at 2,096 in 1950, but then fell as many of the affiliates left, until only the Brick Layers remained. In 1981, the union adopted the name of its sole affiliate, the Ancient Guild of Incorporated Brick Layers' Trade Union. In 1998, it merged with the National Union of Wood Workers and Wood Cutting Machinists, to form the Building and Allied Trades' Union.

== General Secretaries ==
1942: Mark Daly
1949: Francis O'Connor
