= Irish Bookbinders' and Allied Trades Union =

Irish trade union

- Cumann Ceirde Cluduigte Leabar Agus a Com-Ceard i n-Eirinn
- Predecessor: National Union of Bookbinders and Machine Rulers
- Merged into: Irish Print Union
- Founded: 1920
- Dissolved: 1983
- Headquarters: 20 North Frederick Street, Dublin
- Location: Ireland
- Members: 1,000 (1950s)
- Affiliations: Irish Congress of Trade Unions

The Irish Bookbinders' and Allied Trades Union (Irish: Cumann Ceirde Cluduigte Leabar Agus a Com-Ceard i n-Eirinn) was a trade union representing print workers in Ireland.

The union was founded in 1920 as the Irish Bookbinders' and Paper Rulers' Trade Union, by Dublin-based members of the UK-based National Union of Bookbinders and Machine Rulers. It became the "Irish Bookbinders' and Allied Trades Union" in 1938. From 1941, the Irish government required unions to obtain a license, and the National Union thereafter withdrew from Ireland, the Irish Bookbinders thereafter recruiting throughout the country; by the 1950, it had around 1,000 members.

Originally part of the Irish Trades Union Congress, the union was a founding member of the rival Congress of Irish Unions. The two confederations later merged to form the Irish Congress of Trade Unions, of which the union maintained membership.

In 1983, the union merged with the Irish Graphical Society and the Electrotypers' and Stereotypers' Society of Dublin and District to form the Irish Print Union.

== General Secretaries ==
1920: Michael Colgan
1953: Terence Farrell
1960s: J. Cullen
