= Fintan Kennedy =

Irish politician and trade unionist (died 1984)

Senator
- In office 5 November 1969 – 8 October 1981
- Constituency: Labour Panel

Personal details
- Died: 24 March 1984
- Party: Labour Party
- Parent: Thomas Kennedy (father)

Fintan Kennedy (died 24 March 1984) was an Irish politician and trade unionist.

The son of Thomas Kennedy, a prominent trade unionist, Kennedy joined the Irish Transport and General Workers' Union in 1934, rising to serve as General Secretary of the union from 1959, then as General President from 1969. During his secretaryship, membership of the union grew steadily.

In 1966, Kennedy served as President of the Irish Congress of Trade Unions, while he served as Treasurer from 1968. He was elected to the Labour Panel of the Seanad Éireann in 1969 and representing the Labour Party. He retired from all his positions in the labour movement in 1981.

Trade union offices
Preceded by Frank Purcell	General Secretary of the Irish Transport and General Workers' Union; 1959–1969	Succeeded by Michael Mullen
Preceded by John Conroy	Treasurer of the Irish Congress of Trade Unions; 1967–1982	Succeeded by Patrick Clancy
Preceded by John Conroy	General President of the Irish Transport and General Workers' Union; 1969–1981	Succeeded by John Carroll
Preceded by Dominick Murphy	President of the Irish Congress of Trade Unions; 1966	Succeeded by Bob Thompson
