= Operative Plasterers and Allied Trades Society of Ireland =

OPATSI
- Operative Plasterers and Allied Trades Society of Ireland
- Founded: 13 September 1893
- Headquarters: 18 Merrion Square, Dublin
- Location: Ireland
- Key people: Martin Murphy (President), Brian Fahy (V. President) Billy Wall (General Secretary) Barry Murphy (Deputy General Secretary)
- Affiliations: ICTU
- Website: opatsi.ie

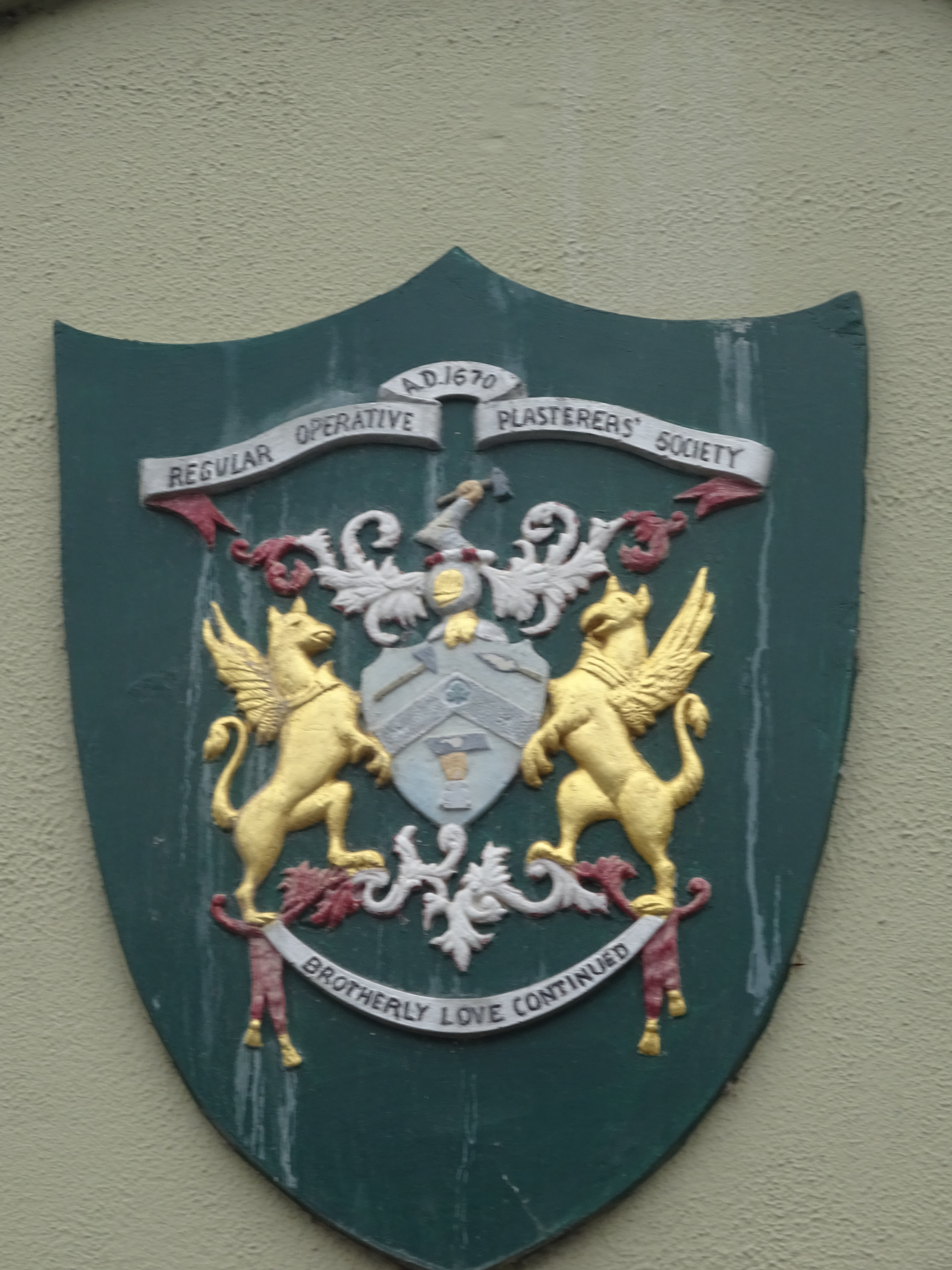
Arms of the Regular Operative Plasterers' Society

The Operative Plasterers and Allied Trades Society of Ireland (OPATSI) is a trade union representing plasterers and allied trades such as Tilers, Slaters, Metal Stud Fixers and Ceiling fixers in Ireland.

The union was founded in 1893 as the Regular Stucco Plasterers' Trade Union of the City of Dublin. In its early years, it met at the Trades Hall on Capel Street in Dublin, and was led by Harry Murtagh and James O'Neill. From its early days, the union has claimed to have descended from St Bartholomew Guild of Plasterers and Bricklayers which, it claims, was founded in 1670.

Gerard Doyle became secretary of the union in 1928, and under his leadership it was renamed as the Operative Plasterers Society. Leo Crawford became president in 1938, and brought it to prominence within the Irish trade union movement. Under his leadership, the union was a founder of the Congress of Irish Unions. In the 1950s, its main rival, the British-based National Association of Operative Plasterers, decided to withdraw from Ireland, and its Irish members transferred to the Dublin-based union, which took the name "Operative Plasterers and Allied Trades Society of Ireland" to reflect its broader remit.

Today the union is based in Merrion Square, where a number of other Unions reside. The Union has remained an autonomous craft union and continues to defend the craft of Plastering vigorously considering the craft encapsulates many different disciplines. 2018 saw the Union celebrating 125 years representing craft workers.

In more recent times, the union have embarked on a campaign to highlight the issue of bogus self employment in the construction sector. A number of cases have been referred to the Workplace Relations Commission. Plasterers have now been properly designated as employees in order to vindicate their rights as workers under law. Below are some decisions.

== General Secretaries ==
1901: George Leahy
1912: Thomas Irwin
1928: Gerard Doyle
1973: James Irwin
1981: Richard Kearney
2010: Billy Wall

== Presidents ==
1938: Leo Crawford
1969: James Cheevers
1979: Eamonn Sinclair
1992: Jimmy Irwin
1999: Gerry Lumsden
2009: Sean Irwin
2019: Eugene Moloney
2020: Martin Murphy
