= National Engineering Union =

The National Engineering Union (NEU) was a trade union in Ireland.

The union was founded in 1922 as the Irish General Railway and Engineering Union, a split from the Irish Engineering Industrial Union. It initially had only 612 members, most of whom worked for the Great Southern and Western Railway. In 1925, it applied to affiliate to the Irish Trade Union Congress (ITUC), but was rejected as other union already represented engineering workers. In 1933, it renamed itself as the Irish Engineering and Foundry Union (IE&FU). It reapplied to the ITUC in 1939, but the Plumbers', Glaziers' and Domestic Engineers' Union objected to its membership, a situation resolved by transferring the IE&FU's heating section to the plumbers' union. In 1945, the union affiliated to the new Congress of Irish Unions, and by 1947 membership had grown to 2,500.

The union renamed itself as the "National Engineering Union" in 1956, and in 1966 it merged into the National Engineering and Electrical Trade Union. However, the merger was not legally finalised until 1976, and the NEU existed on paper until 1977.

== General Secretaries ==
1922: Thomas Quinn
1923: Thomas Balfe
1925: Edward Gaynor
1933: Thomas Fleming
1937: Patrick O'Hagan
1942: John Cassidy
