= Owen Hynes =

Irish trade union leader

Owen Hynes (1875 – February 1970) was an Irish trade union leader.

Hynes was a member of the Ancient Guild of Incorporated Brick and Stone Layers. He came to prominence as a member of the trade union committee during the 1913 Dublin lock-out. The union's secretary, Dick Carroll, was shot in 1916 for his part in the Easter Rising, and Hynes succeeded him. A less public figure than many of his contemporaries, he devoted much of his time to committee work, in negotiations, with the Irish Trades Union Congress and at the International Labour Organization.

Hynes was active in the Labour Party, and was elected to the Dublin Poor Law Union in 1920, a year in which Sinn Féin won the vast majority of seats. He stood in the 1925 Seanad election, but took only 1,273 votes and was eliminated on the eighteenth of sixty-five counts. He served on the Dublin Corporation for some years until he lost his seat in 1933. At the 1943 Irish general election, he stood in Dublin South, but did not come close to election.

He hoped to unite all the Irish building workers in a single union. In support of this aim, he was one of the leading founders of the Congress of Irish Unions, and soon after formed the Building Workers' Irish Union. The president of Congress in 1949, he retired in about 1955.

In his spare time, Hynes studied Gaelic culture and the Irish language.

Trade union offices
| Preceded by W. J. Whelan | President of the Congress of Irish Unions; 1949 | Succeeded by Michael Colgan |
