= Irish National Union of Vintners', Grocers' and Allied Trades Assistants =

The Irish National Union of Vintners', Grocers' and Allied Trades Assistants (INUVGATA), also known as the Barmen's Union, was a trade union representing retail and bar staff, principally in Ireland.

The union originated in 1863 in Dublin as the Grocers' Assistants' Association. In 1885, it became the Grocers' and Vintners' Association of Dublin, and it later became the "Irish National Union of Vintners', Grocers' and Allied Trades Assistants". The union merged into the British National Amalgamated Union of Shop Assistants, but many of its former members wished to retain an independent Irish organisation, and split away in 1917, reforming under the old name.

Under the presidency of Patrick Moran, the union gained a reputation for militancy, gaining recognition following a lock-out in 1918, and striking for ten weeks over pay in 1920. The union joined the Irish Trades Union Congress in 1919, but left again in 1923. In 1945, it affiliated to the Congress of Irish Unions, and then transferred to its successor, the Irish Congress of Trade Unions.

Over time, the union became strongly associated with bar staff. Although the majority of its members were based in Ireland, it also had branches in London, which attracted membership from workers at Irish pubs in the city.

The union merged with the Irish Distributive and Administrative Trade Union in 1994, forming MANDATE.

== General Secretaries ==
1917: Patrick Hughes
1929: Valentine J. Forde
1932: Eamonn Cooney
1937: Walter Beirne
1959: James Candon
1962: Michael Cleary
1977: Patrick Coffey
1981: Jack Cagney
1991: Aidan McCormack
1993: John Douglas
