= Christy Kirwan =

Irish politician and trade unionist (died 2014)

Senator
- In office 23 February 1983 – 25 April 1987
- Constituency: Nominated by the Taoiseach

Personal details
- Born: Dublin, Ireland
- Died: 24 November 2013 Dublin, Ireland
- Party: Labour Party

Christopher Kirwan (died 24 November 2013) was an Irish Labour Party politician and trade unionist. He served as a member of Seanad Éireann from 1983 to 1987. He was nominated by the Taoiseach Garret FitzGerald to the 17th Seanad in 1983. He did not contest the 1987 Seanad election.

He was a lifelong trade unionist and in 1981 was the General Secretary of the Irish Transport and General Workers' Union (ITGWU).

Trade union offices
Preceded by John Carroll	Vice-President of the Irish Transport and General Workers' Union; 1982–1983	Succeeded by Edmund Browne
Preceded by Michael Mullen	General Secretary of the Irish Transport and General Workers' Union; 1983–1990	Position abolished
Preceded by Patrick Clancy	Treasurer of the Irish Congress of Trade Unions; 1985–1989	Succeeded by Edmund Browne
New office	General Secretary of SIPTU; 1990–1994; Served alongside: Tom Garry	Succeeded by Bill Attley
Preceded by Jimmy Blair	President of the Irish Congress of Trade Unions; 1991	Succeeded by Tom Douglas
