= Irish National Union of Woodworkers =

The Irish National Union of Woodworkers (INUW) was a trade union representing woodworkers in Ireland.

Woodworkers in Ireland were originally unionised in the British-based Amalgamated Society of Woodworkers (ASW). In 1922, the majority split away to form the INUW. It affiliated to the Irish Trades Union Congress in 1931, finally overcoming the opposition of the ASW. In 1942, it was prominent in the formation of the Building Workers' Trade Union (BWTU), to which it affiliated. The INUW general secretary, Mark Daly, also became general secretary of the BWTU. However, it disaffiliated from the BWTU in 1965.

In 1965, the union absorbed the Irish Packing Case Makers', Nailing Machinists' and Box Makers' Trade Union. During this period, it was affiliated to the Irish Congress of Trade Unions. In 1971, it was a founding affiliate of the new Federation of Irish Industrial and Building Operatives' Trade Union, a loose federation which collapsed after a couple of years.

In 1974, the union changed its name to the Irish Union of Woodworkers. The union's membership grew steadily over the years, reaching a peak of 2,000 in 1979. That year, it merged with the Irish Society of Woodcutting Machinists, forming the National Union of Woodworkers and Woodcutting Machinists.

== General Secretaries ==
1922: John Moore
1931: P. Moore
1934: Mark Daly
1957: Peter McGrath
1975: George Lamon
