= Indraprasta PGRI University =

Coordinates: 6°18′8.79″S 106°50′59.01″E

- Universitas Indraprasta PGRI
- Type: Private university
- Established: 1982 under the name of STKIP PGRI Jakarta and became university in 2004
- Rector: Prof. Dr. H. Sumaryoto
- Location: Tanjung Barat and Pasar Rebo, Jakarta, Indonesia
- Colors: Blue
- Website: www.unindra.ac.id

Indraprasta PGRI University (formerly STKIP PGRI Jakarta) (Indonesian: Universitas Indraprasta PGRI) is an Indonesian university founded in 1982. It offers open degree programs. The campus is in Tanjung Barat, South Jakarta and Pasar Rebo, East Jakarta. Faculties include education and social sciences, engineering, mathematics and natural science and language and arts.

== History ==
STKIP PGRI Jakarta (Indonesian: Sekolah Tinggi Keguruan Dan Ilmu Pendidikan Persatuan Guru Republik Indonesia) (English: College of Teacher Training and Teacher's Education Association of the Republic of Indonesia) officially became Indraprasta PGRI University on November 6, 2004, based on SK Mendiknas RI No.142/D/O/2004 by the Ministry of National Education of Indonesia.
