= Des Geraghty =

Irish former politician and trade union leader (born 1943)

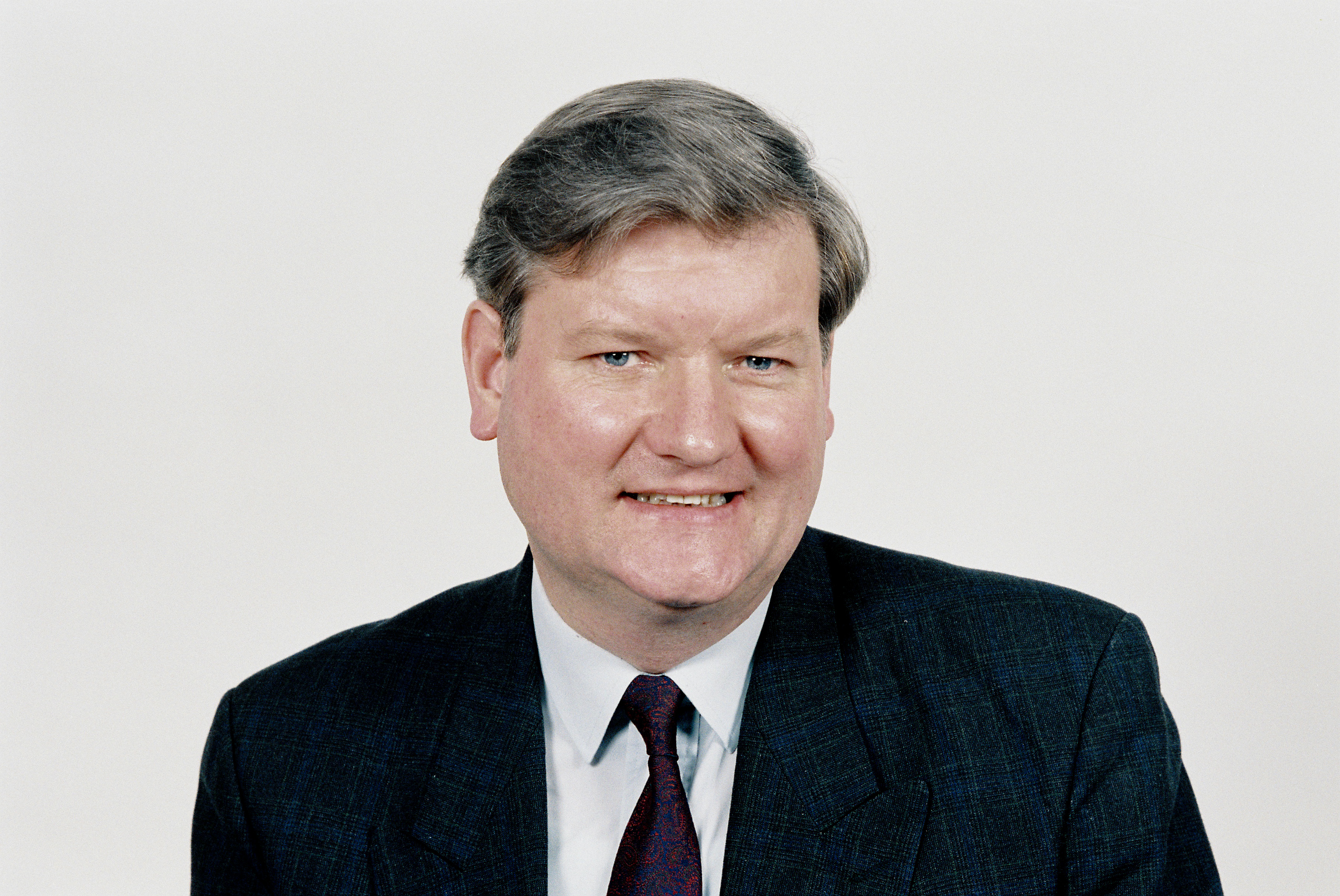
- Geraghty in 1992

Member of the European Parliament
- In office 18 February 1992 – 9 June 1994
- Constituency: Dublin

Personal details
- Born: 27 October 1943 (age 82) Dublin, Ireland
- Party: Workers' Party; Democratic Left; Labour Party

Desmond Geraghty (born 27 October 1943) is an Irish former politician and trade union leader. He was president of SIPTU from 1999 to 2004. He stood unsuccessfully at the 1984 European Parliament election for the Dublin constituency as a Workers' Party candidate. He briefly served as General Secretary of the Workers' Party from 1991 to 1992, succeeding Seán Garland and played a prominent role in events leading up to the split in that party. In 1992 Geraghty joined the newly founded Democratic Left party.

He was appointed to the European Parliament in 1992 for the Dublin constituency following the resignation of Proinsias De Rossa. He was a member of the Committee on Economic and Monetary Affairs and Industrial Policy in the European Parliament. He did not contest the 1994 European Parliament election. He stood unsuccessfully as a Labour Party candidate in the 2002 Seanad election for the Labour Panel.

Geraghty was a member of the board of the Central Bank of Ireland from 2009 to 2019. He is a former member of the RTÉ Board. He has published several books including one about folk singer Luke Kelly. He is also a member of the board of Poetry Ireland.

== Bibliography ==
- 40 Shades of Green, Des Geraghty, Real Ireland Design, 2007
- Luke Kelly: a Memoir, Des Geraghty, Basement Press, 1994, ISBN 1-85594-090-6

Trade union offices
Preceded by Jimmy Somers	Vice President of SIPTU; 1997–1999	Succeeded by Jack O'Connor
Preceded by Jimmy Somers	General President of SIPTU; 1999–2003	Succeeded by Jack O'Connor
