= Irish Print Union =

- Merged into: SIPTU
- Founded: November 1983
- Dissolved: 1998
- Headquarters: 35 Gardiner Street Lower, Dublin
- Location: Ireland
- Key people: Owen Curran (General Secretary)
- Affiliations: Irish Congress of Trade Unions

The Irish Print Union was a trade union representing print workers in Ireland.

The union was founded in 1983 when the Irish Graphical Society merged with the Irish Bookbinders' and Allied Trades Union and the Electrotypers' and Stereotypers' Society of Dublin and District. However, the union struggled with declining employment in the industry, in particular as computerisation was introduced. Membership of the union fell, and in 1998 it merged into the Services, Industrial, Professional and Technical Trade Union.

== General Secretaries ==
1983: Owen Curran
