= National Engineering and Electrical Trade Union =

Trade Union

- Merged into: Technical, Engineering and Electrical Union
- Founded: 1920
- Dissolved: 2001
- Headquarters: 6 Gardiner Row, Dublin
- Location: Ireland
- Members: 14,044 (1978)
- Affiliations: ICTU

The National Engineering and Electrical Trade Union (NEETU) was a trade union representing engineering workers in Ireland.

The union was formed in 1920 as the Irish Engineering Industrial Union. Its first couple of years were turbulent, with the Irish Stationary Engine Drivers and the Operative Society of Mechanical Heating and Domestic Engineers, Whitesmiths, Ironworkers, and Pipe Fitters both joining, but the Irish General Railway and Engineering Union and the Electrical Trades Union both splitting away.

In 1948, the union renamed itself as the Irish Engineering, Industrial and Electrical Trade Union. The National Engineering Union (a renaming of the Irish General Railway and Engineering Union) amalgamated into the union in 1966, and the union renamed itself as the National Engineering and Electrical Trade Union. However, the merger was not recognised by the government, and the National Engineering Union continued to exist on paper until 1976.

In 2001, the union merged with the Electrical Trades Union, forming the Technical, Engineering and Electrical Union.

== General Secretaries ==
1924: Patrick O'Hagan
1927: John O'Brien
1960: Anthony Tuke
1967: Kevin McConnell
1966: John Cassidy and Kevin McConnell
1977:
