= SIPTU =

Ireland's largest trade union

- Services, Industrial, Professional and Technical Union
- Founded: 1990
- Headquarters: Dublin, Ireland
- Location: Ireland
- Members: 206,881
- General Secretary: John King
- Affiliations: ICTU,
- Website: www.siptu.ie

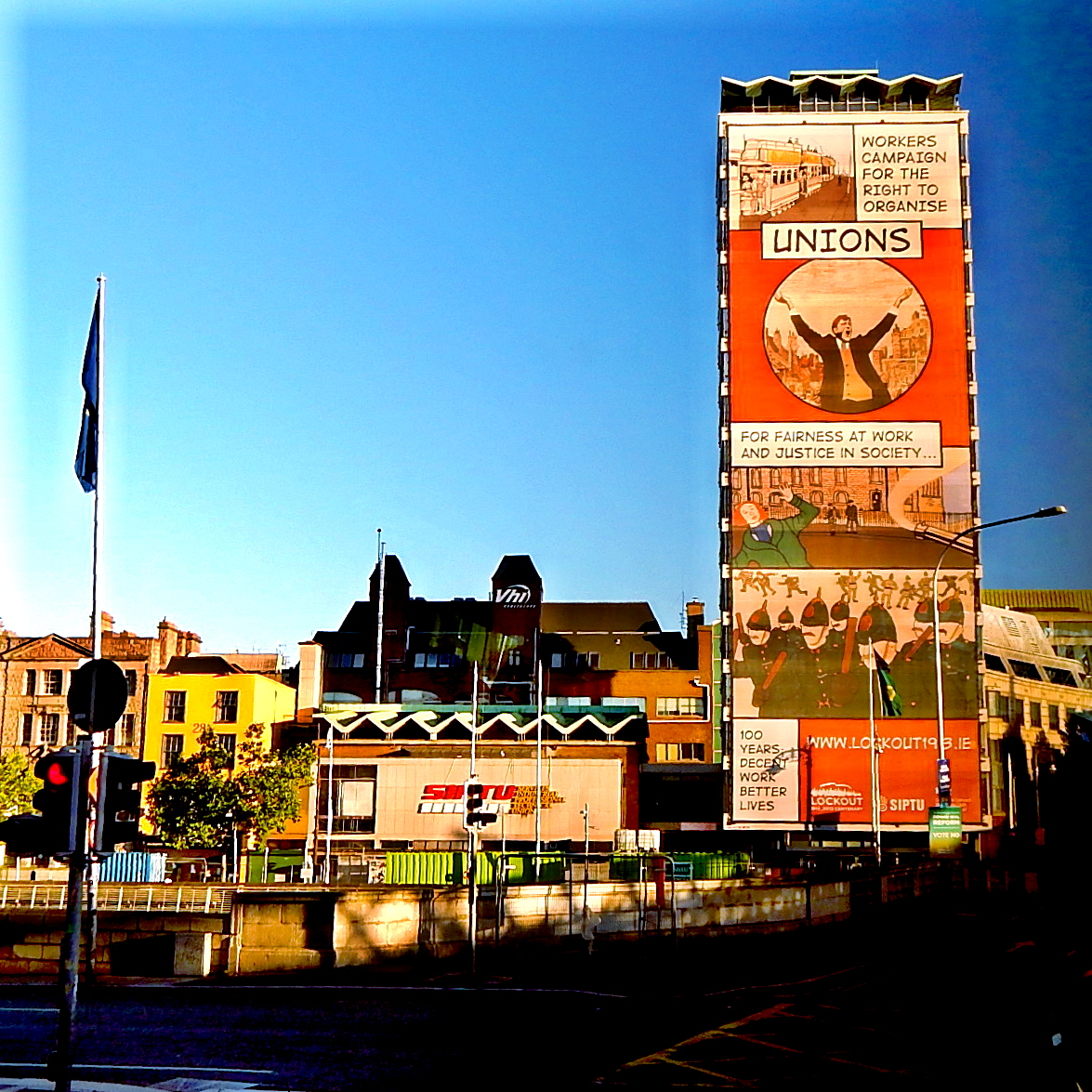
SIPTU headquarters at Liberty Hall, Dublin

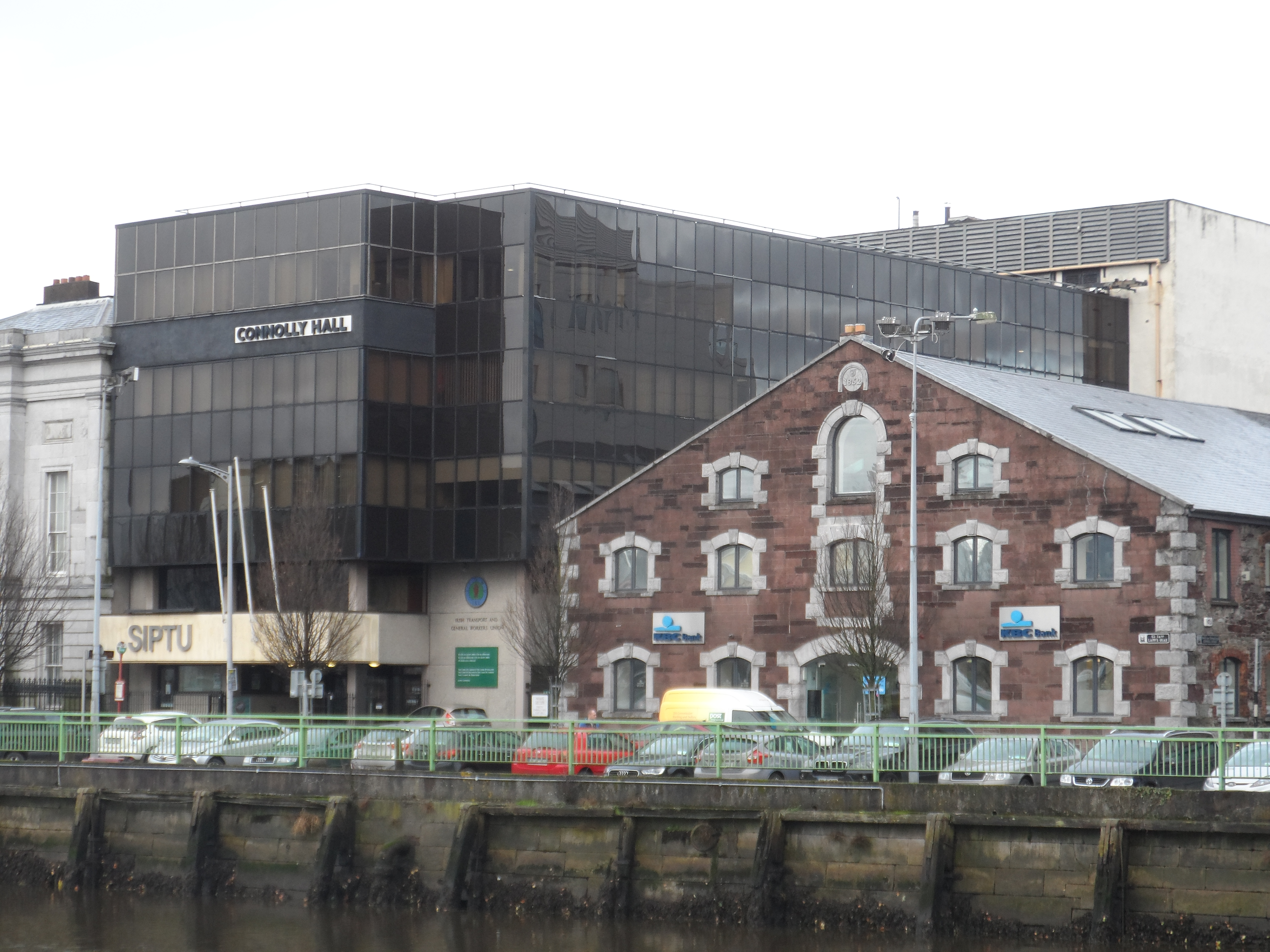
SIPTU's Connolly Hall, Cork

SIPTU (/ˈsɪptuː/; Services, Industrial, Professional and Technical Union; Irish: An Ceardchumann Seirbhísí, Tionsclaíoch, Gairmiúil agus Teicniúil) is Ireland's largest trade union, with around 200,000 members. Most of these members are in the Republic of Ireland, although the union does have a Northern Ireland District Committee. Its head office, Liberty Hall, is in Dublin, and the union has five industrial divisions, three in the private sector and two in the public sector. SIPTU is affiliated to the Irish Congress of Trade Unions.

== History ==
The Union has its roots in two separate trade unions both founded by the trade union leader and socialist activist James Larkin; the Irish Transport and General Workers' Union and the Federated Workers' Union of Ireland. The two unions merged in 1990 to create SIPTU. The merge was first proposed in the 1950s, and almost happened in 1969.

SIPTU is a general union which organises across the public and private sectors in Ireland and has large numbers of members working in construction, health, education, transport and manufacturing. It has a long-term commitment to delivering social solidarity and has developed a leadership role in the areas of rights for unemployed persons, people with disabilities and older persons. The union, as part of promoting fairness at work and justice in society, includes migrant workers in Ireland and campaigns on the twin issues of the exploitation of migrant workers, particularly those from Poland, Latvia and Lithuania, and the consequent displacement of Irish workers from employment.

The union established an Organising Unit in 2004 and its former president, Jack O'Connor, set as his objective the transformation of SIPTU - hitherto firmly committed to a servicing agenda - into an organising union.

== Mergers ==
Since its formation, several smaller unions have merged into SIPTU:

1991: Irish National Painters' and Decorators' Trade Union
1993: Irish Writers' Union
1997: Automobile, General Engineering and Mechanical Operatives' Union
1998: Irish Print Union, Marine, Port and General Workers' Union, Professional Footballers' Association of Ireland
2002: Musicians' Union of Ireland

== Leadership ==
=== General secretaries ===
1990: Tom Garry and Christy Kirwan
1994: Bill Attley
1998: John McDonnell
2002: Joe O'Flynn
2020: Joe Cunningham
2026: John King

=== General presidents ===
1990: John Carroll and Bill Attley
1990: Bill Attley and Edmund Browne
1994: Edmund Browne
1997: Jimmy Somers
1999: Des Geraghty
2003: Jack O'Connor
2017: Position abolished

=== Vice presidents ===
1990: Tom Murphy and Edmund Browne
1990: Tom Murphy
1994: Jimmy Somers
1997: Des Geraghty
2000: Jack O'Connor
2003: Brendan Hayes
2010: Patricia King
2015: Gene Mealy
2017: Position abolished

== See also ==
- List of trade unions
