= Irish Transport and General Workers' Union =

Irish trade union (1909–1990)

- Ceardchumann Iompair agus Ilsaothair na hÉireann
- Predecessor: National Union of Dock Labourers
- Merged into: SIPTU
- Founded: January 1909
- Dissolved: 1990
- Location: Ireland
- Key people: James Larkin

The Irish Transport and General Workers Union (ITGWU) was a trade union representing workers, initially mainly labourers, in Ireland.

== History ==
The union was founded by James Larkin and James Fearon in January 1909 as a general union. Initially drawing its membership from branches of the Liverpool-based National Union of Dock Labourers, from which Larkin had been expelled, it grew to include workers in a range of industries. The ITGWU logo was the Red Hand of Ulster, which is synonymous with ancient Gaelic Ulster. The Red Hand was adopted as the permanent logo of the union in 1919: previously, the Union used arms of the four Provinces of Ireland in rotation. Permanent choice of the Red Hand of Ulster was motivated by the fact that it was the logo used during the Dublin Lockout, and as such became synonymous with the organisation.

The ITGWU was at the centre of the syndicalist-inspired Dublin Lockout in 1913, the events of which left a lasting impression on the union and hence on the Irish Labour Movement.

After Larkin's departure for the United States in 1914 in the wake of the Lockout, James Connolly led the ITGWU until his execution in 1916 in the wake of the Easter Rising. In turn, William O'Brien became the union's leading figure, and ultimately served as general secretary for many years. Throughout World War I, the ITGWU consistently opposed Irish belligerence, and staunchly supported the advanced nationalist cause. In fact, ITGWU members, in the uniform of the Irish Citizen Army, played a leading role in the Easter Rising, while the Transport Union led a national strike that crippled an attempt to introduce conscription to Ireland in 1918.

In 1923, Larkin formed a new union, the Workers' Union of Ireland, to which many of the ITGWU's Dublin members affiliated. The ITGWU nevertheless remained the dominant force in Irish trade unionism, especially outside the capital. William O'Brien and James Larkin remained bitter personal enemies, and when Larkin and his supporters were readmitted into the Labour Party in the early 1940s, O'Brien engineered a split in the party, with the new National Labour Party claiming that the main party had been infiltrated by communists. A further split occurred in the Irish Trades Union Congress when that body accepted the WUI's membership in 1945. The ITGWU left the Congress and established the rival Congress of Irish Unions.

From the 1950s on proposals to merge the two unions were floated. Finally, in 1990, the ITGWU merged with the Workers' Union of Ireland to form SIPTU (Services, Industrial, Professional and Technical Union).

The ITGWU should not be confused with the British-based Transport and General Workers Union, which organised in Ireland under the name Amalgamated Transport and General Workers Union (ATGWU) and is now Unite the Union.

== Mergers ==
The union absorbed numerous smaller trade unions:

1914: Dublin Coal Factors' Association
1915: Kilkenny Brewery Labourers' Trade Union
1917: Irish Glass Bottle Makers' Society, Rathmines and District Workers' Union
1918: Stonecutters' Union of Ireland (split 1925)
1919: Brewery Workers' Association (Cork), Carpet Planners of the City of Dublin, Dublin Saddlers and Harness Makers' Trade Society, Irish Land and Labour Association, Irish National Agricultural and General Workers' Union, Mullingar Trade and Labour Union, Queenstown and District Government Labourers' Union
1920: United Building Labourers and General Workers of Dublin Trade Union
1921: Amalgamated Society of Pork Butchers (Limerick and Waterford)
1922: Meath Labour Union
1923: Irish Automobile Drivers' Society
1925: Irish Mental Hospital Workers' Union
1938: Dublin Coal Factors' Association, Dublin United Tramway and Omnibus Inspectors' Association
1941: Limerick Corporation Employees' Union
1943: Tipperary Workingmen's Protective and Benefit Society
1950: Cumann Teicneori Innealoireachta
1953: Clothing Workers' Union (Derry)
1976: National Union of Gold, Silver and Allied Trades (Irish branches)
1977: Irish Shoe and Leather Workers' Union
1979: Irish Actors' Equity Association
1981: Irish Racecourse Bookmakers' Assistants' Association
1982: Irish Federation of Musicians and Associated Professionals (later split)

== Leadership ==
=== General Secretaries ===
1909: James Larkin
1924: William O'Brien
1946: Tom Kennedy
1948: Frank Purcell
1959: Fintan Kennedy
1969: Michael Mullen
1983: Christy Kirwan

=== General presidents ===
1909: Thomas Foran
1939: Tom Kennedy
1946: William McMullen
1953: John Conroy
1969: Fintan Kennedy
1981: John Carroll

=== Vice-Presidents ===
1924: Tom Kennedy
1940: William McMullen
1947: John Conroy
1953: Edward Browne
1969: John Carroll
1981: Tom O'Brien
1982: Christy Kirwan
1983: Edmund Browne
