= Sheila Dowling =

Irish republican (c. 1896–1957)

- Born: Sheila Bowen c. 1896
- Died: 26 June 1957 (aged 60–61); Hume Street hospital, Dublin, Ireland
- Burial place: Glasnevin Cemetery
- Organization: Irish Women Workers' Union
- Political party: Sinn Féin; Saor Éire (1931); Labour Party (1939)
- Military career
- Branch: Cumann na mBan
- Conflicts: Irish Civil War

Sheila or Sighle Dowling (c. 1896 – 26 June 1957) was an Irish republican, socialist, trade unionist, feminist and a member of Cumann na mBan.

== Early career ==
Dowling was born Sheila Bowen around 1896. She worked as a stenographer in the Dáil courts in north Dublin city during the War of Independence, working for the republican solicitor Michael Noyk. During a raid on an IRA depot in Blackhall Place, Dowling was arrested and taken to Dublin Castle. She successfully disposed of important papers by eating them. She was opposed to the Anglo-Irish Treaty, and was arrested leaving Dublin on her way to speak in Glasgow for Sinn Féin during the Civil War. Dowling was one of the group of 81 republican women prisoners in Kilmainham Gaol who resisted their transfer to the North Dublin Union as they did not want to be separated from two of their colleagues who were on hunger strike. The group was forcibly moved with marked violence by male prison officers in May 1923. She was on the executive of Cumann na mBan by the late 1920s. Dowling was active in the labour movement, working as the personal secretary to the general secretary of the Irish Transport and General Workers' Union, William O'Brien, working as an organiser for the Irish Women Workers' Union (IWWU), representing the Union on the Dublin trades' council and representing the Irish Trade Union Congress at the international labour conferences in Prague and Geneva. Around 1930, she married Frank Dowling. He later worked as the manager of Dublin's Metropole cinema. They had one daughter.

== Career post Irish independence ==
Within the IWWU Dowling was a close associate of the militant socialist and pro-republican Helena Molony, which brought her into conflict with the more moderate Louie Bennett and Helen Chenevix. The tensions between the two groups in the early 1930s were focused on Dowling's and Molony's pro-Soviet sympathies and associations with Irish communists. She was an active member in the Irish section of Friends of Soviet Russia, visiting the USSR in the summer of 1930 with a delegation with Hanna Sheehy-Skeffington and Charlotte Despard. Impressed by the apparent promise of gender equality in the USSR, Dowling lectured on life there, generating more controversy.

In September 1931, Dowling was one of the four women on the founding executive of Saor Éire. When the group was banned by the Free State government, Dowling withdrew from the executive. After the legal re-interpretation of union rules on members receiving marriage benefit, Dowling was forced to resign as IWWU president and trustee in March 1932. This highlighted the contradiction between IWWU's support for gender equality with its reluctance to facilitate married women entering the workforce. It has been speculated that it was Bennett who exploited the issue to force Dowling out. She continued to work with other groups, such as the British Boycott Committee, and opposed the ratification of the 1937 Irish constitution on the grounds of how it would affect women and their role in society. She campaigned with the Labour Party in Dublin when it opposed the 1939 Offences Against the State Act.

Dowling lived at 8 Belgrave Road, Rathmines, Dublin from the early 1940s. She died from breast cancer at Hume Street hospital on 26 June 1957 and is buried in Glasnevin Cemetery. Senator Frank Purcell remembered Dowling as "the nicest and most sincere little woman I ever met…a grand character".
