= Alice Brady (labour activist) =

- Born: 5 February 1898; Dublin, Ireland
- Died: 1 January 1914 (aged 15); Sir Patrick Dun's Hospital, Dublin
- Known for: death during the Dublin Lock-out

Alice Brady (1898–1914) was a labour activist that was shot and killed during the 1913 Dublin Lock-out. She was shot accidentally in the hand by a worker and died two weeks later of tetanus. The worker was charged but acquitted of her murder. Members from the Irish Women Workers' Union used her funeral as a show of strength. A service was held on Saturday, 4 January 2014 to mark the centenary of Brady's funeral, and RTÉ One broadcast a documentary on the lockout involving descendants of participants and members of Brady's family.

== Life and career ==
Brady was born in 1898 in Dublin, Ireland into a working-class family to parents Michael and Elizabeth (née Flynn). Alice was the eldest of six children, four surviving past infancy. Brady worked for Jacob's factory in Dublin and was a member of the Irish Transport and General Workers' Union (ITGWU). Brady was among the first people to die as a result of the social conflict surrounding the 1913 Lockout. She died at 16 years of age after being shot during a riot associated with the Lock-out.

== Lockout and death ==
Brady was 16 when she was shot in the hand during a minor riot in Dublin city, in which she had not been involved. She was returning home after receiving a food relief parcel. Some sources, such as Francis Devane say the incident happened in Great Brunswick Street but other publications at the time say it happened in Mark Street. The riot was caused when a group of women screamed at coal workers, who apparently broke the strike. One worker, Patrick Traynor, panicked and shot into the crowd twice. In the court case it was argued that Traynor did not intend to shoot at anyone and did not aim at Brady. However Traynor was charged, and later acquitted, of the murder of Brady. She died on 1 January 1914, two weeks after being shot, in Sir Patrick Dun's Hospital as a result of her developing tetanus (lockjaw) from the bullet wound.

== Funeral ==
Thousands gathered to pay respect at Brady's funeral on 5 January 1914. There was a funeral cortège from her home in 21a Luke Street to Glasnevin Cemetery. Reportedly 500 members from the Irish Women Workers' Union attended the funeral and the union used the occasion as a show of strength. Many prominent faces of the Lockout were amongst the mourners, including James Larkin, Delia Larkin, Countess Markievicz, and James Connolly. Both Larkin and Connolly delivered orations at the graveside. In his speech Connolly said, "Every scab and every employer of scab labour in Dublin is morally responsible for the death of the young girl we have just buried." Larkin spoke candidly at Brady's funeral, "Though she was only a young girl she had shown great strength of character, and if she had been spared, she would, I believe, have been a great woman." Brady's death was often cited within publications and speeches of the time, one of the most noted being by Connolly who described her as a "as true a martyr for freedom."

== Commemorative celebrations ==
A service was held on Saturday, 4 January 2014 organised by the 1913 Committee, SIPTU trade union, and Equality Department and the Glasnevin Trust to mark the centenary of Brady's funeral. RTÉ One broadcast a documentary on Monday 16 December 2013, "My Lockout" involving descendants of participants, including members of Brady's family, as well as experts on the Lockout to give historical context.
