= R. M. Fox =

Richard Michael Fox
- Born: 13 November 1891
- Died: 28 December 1969 (aged 78)
- Citizenship: British; Irish
- Education: Ruskin College
- Occupations: Journalist, Author, Historian
- Spouse: Patricia Lynch

Richard Michael Fox (13 November 1891 – 28 December 1969), better known as R. M. Fox, was a British-Irish journalist and historian of the Irish left.

== Biography ==
=== Background ===
Fox was born in Leeds in 13 November 1891, the second of four sons to a schoolteacher mother and engineering workman father. His family moved to London as a child, where he left school at age 14. Following this he began to work in factories where he became interested in socialism. His parents were active in the Co-operative Movement, and as a young man Fox joined the Socialist Party of Great Britain and the Industrial Workers of the World (IWW).

Fox attended the Lancastrian Elementary School and left at age 14 to work in a metal factory. He took night classes in economics and history, wrote poetry for small socialist publications, and became involved in the struggle for workers' rights. After studying engineering at night school, he worked at the Erith armaments complex in southeast London. Fox organized with the IWW and was an activist with the Herald League, which supported the syndicalist Daily Herald newspaper, advocating for Woman's suffrage, striking workers, and Irish independence. He also promoted international labour unity and campaigned against militarism.

=== Conscientious objector ===
On the outbreak of World War I, Fox denounced it as an imperialist war in which workers had no interest. As an armaments worker, Fox was initially exempt from conscription, but he later renounced his exemption, leading to his arrest in November 1916. He was tried and imprisoned three times throughout the war. He was abruptly released in April 1919; later that year he authored his first book, Factory Echoes, and enrolled at Ruskin College in Oxford where he studied Economics and Political Science. During the same post-prison period, Fox he was introduced by fellow IWW member Henry Lynch to his sister, writer Patricia Lynch.

While at Ruskin, Fox became the editor of New Oxford and gained a reputation as a labour journalist. He was invited to Soviet Russia in 1921 to observe the results of the recent Russian Revolution, and in 1922 he visited Dublin and established contacts with leading leftist figures there. Fox was introduced to left-wing circles by Delia Larkin and through her met Alice Stopford Green, Hanna Sheehy-Skeffington, Dorothy Macardle, and Maud Gonne MacBride, with the latter two becoming his lifelong friends. Fox supported the Irish War of Independence following the death by hunger strike of Terence MacSwiney and subsequent atrocities carried out by the Black and Tans on behalf of the British authorities.

=== Immigratating to Ireland ===
Following his graduation from Ruskin, Fox married Patricia Lynch and they spent time in London, Paris, Brussels, and Germany before eventually settling in Dublin. Fox's articles appeared in the Irish Statesman and in the late 1920s he began publishing his books through Virginia Woolf's Hogarth Press. In 1931 Fox became sub-editor of the Irish Press, a newspaper closely aligned with Fianna Fáil. Fox would remain in the role until 1937 when he was struck by ill health.

His autobiography, Smoky Crusade, was published in 1937.

Active in literary, dramatic, and left-republican circles, Fox joined the National Union of Journalists (NUJ) and the Irish branch of PEN International in the early 1930s. He later served as a committee member and chairman of Irish PEN in 1965, frequently representing Ireland at international PEN congresses. With support from Frank Gallagher, the Irish Press’s first editor, the paper unusually recognized the NUJ. Fox saw the 1934 Dublin newspaper strike as pivotal in fostering union solidarity among Irish journalists. Serving as Dublin NUJ secretary around 1941, he was Ireland's sole delegate at the 1942 NUJ annual meeting in Britain, where he influenced the union’s decision to register with the Irish government. This decision energised the Dublin union, leading to Fox's NUJ nomination for the Cultural and Educational Panel panel in the 1943 Seanad Éireann election, though he was not elected.

During "The Emergency", the Irish Directorate of Military Intelligence was concerned about The Irish Press having Fox, Maire Comerford, Brian O'Neill, Geoffrey Coulter, and Tom Mullins on its staff. Fox faced criticism that he was an apologist for Soviet communism by figures like Fr. Denis Fahey and other right-wing opponents, while also receiving some critique from the left for his biography of Larkin.

Fox also commented on and published on the state of Irish literature and theatre. In 1948, he reviewed Teresa Deevy and commented that while her plays were remarkable, they were not frequently staged. "I ask myself why the work of a modern Irish dramatist of such creative power is not seen more often on the Irish stage."

In 1956, Fox was invited to visit Maoist China for the centenary of George Bernard Shaw, joining pacifists including Hubert Butler, David William Greene, and Arland Ussher. His subsequent China Diary (1959) gives a positive portrayal of the results of the Chinese Communist Revolution, writing that "China is working out a plan of social progress which eliminates social conflict and provides a basis for social harmony".

A committed pacifist, Fox later obtained Irish citizenship, served as vice president of the Irish Campaign for Nuclear Disarmament, and actively promoted Connolly's legacy in Ireland’s left-wing press.

In 1957 he published Jim Larkin: The Rise of the Underman, the first biography of Larkin. Sean O'Casey argued that Fox’s Jim Larkin portrayed Larkin as “a lighted match instead of the flaming torch the man was,” and Jack Carney found it “highly superficial,” claiming Fox “highlights the commonplace and ignores the important.” Though Peter Berresford Ellis deemed Fox’s work an “essential first step in studies of the Irish left,” a contemporary critic described Fox as more of a background journalist than a prominent figure in the Irish labour movement.

=== Death ===
Fox died on 28 December 1969 aged 78 due to left ventricular failure and bronchopneumonia influenza at Bon Secours Hospital. He is buried in Glasnevin Cemetery.

== Subjects ==
Fox's journalism appeared in Factory Echoes and Other Sketches (1919), The Triumphant Machine (1928), and Drifting Men (1930), addressing topics like Taylorism, the insecurity of industrial work, and the subjugation of people to machines under mass production. He also authored memoirs and historical works: Smoky Crusade (1937) detailed his life up to the early 1920s; Rebel Irishwomen (1935) profiled figures like Sheehy-Skeffington, Eva Gore-Booth, Constance Markievicz, Nora Connolly O'Brien, and Helena Molony; and Green Banners: The Story of the Irish Struggle (1938) presented a popular account of 1916 to 1921, sympathetic to the Irish Citizen Army and anti-Treaty left-republican views.

In the late 1930s, after being approached by the Irish Citizen Army's Old Comrades Association, Fox interviewed veterans and accessed records to write the officially sanctioned History of the Irish Citizen Army (1943), rich with personal testimonies. His James Connolly: The Forerunner (1946) defended James Connolly’s role in the Easter Rising, albeit with a simplified analysis. Fox also published labour and republican pamphlets, including Labour in the National Struggle (1947) and Years of Freedom: The Story of Ireland 1921–1948 (1948), which continued the narrative from Green Banners. His Jim Larkin: The Rise of the Underman (1957), based on interviews with James Larkin Jnr, portrayed Larkin within the English school of socialism rather than as a syndicalist, while Louie Bennett: Her Life and Times (1958), though largely anecdotal, offered valuable insights into her early years.

== See also ==
- C. Desmond Greaves

== Selected bibliography ==
- Factory Echoes, 1919.
- Drifting Men (1930)
- Rebel Irishwomen, 1935.
- Smoky Crusade, 1937.
- Green Banners: The story of the Irish struggle, 1938.
- The History of the Irish Citizen Army, 1943.
- James Connolly: The Forerunner, 1943
- Years of Freedom: the story of Ireland 1921–48, 1948.
- Labour in the National Struggle (1950s)
- Jim Larkin: The Rise of the Underman, 1957.
- Louie Bennett: Her Life and Times, 1958.
- China Diary, 1959.
