= Daiken =

Daiken may refer to

== People ==
- Leslie Daiken (1912–1964), Irish-Jewish advertising copywriter, poet, and editor, formerly Yodaiken
- Melanie Ruth Daiken (1945–2016), English composer and musician
- Daiken Okudaira (born 2003), Japanese actor

== Other uses ==
- Daiken, the high school equivalency test in Japan
- Daiken Bio, a Taiwanese health supplement company
- Daiken Company Limited, a Japanese company of the Second World War, now Itochu
