= Jacob's =

Biscuit manufacturer

Jacob's "1885" registered trademark used on several lines of biscuits

Jacob's is an Irish brand of biscuits and crackers primarily sold in Ireland and the United Kingdom. Jacob's is owned in the Irish market by Jacob Fruitfield Food Group, part of Valeo Foods; in the UK market by Pladis, through Pladis (UK) Limited; and in the Asian market by Mondelēz International.

== History ==
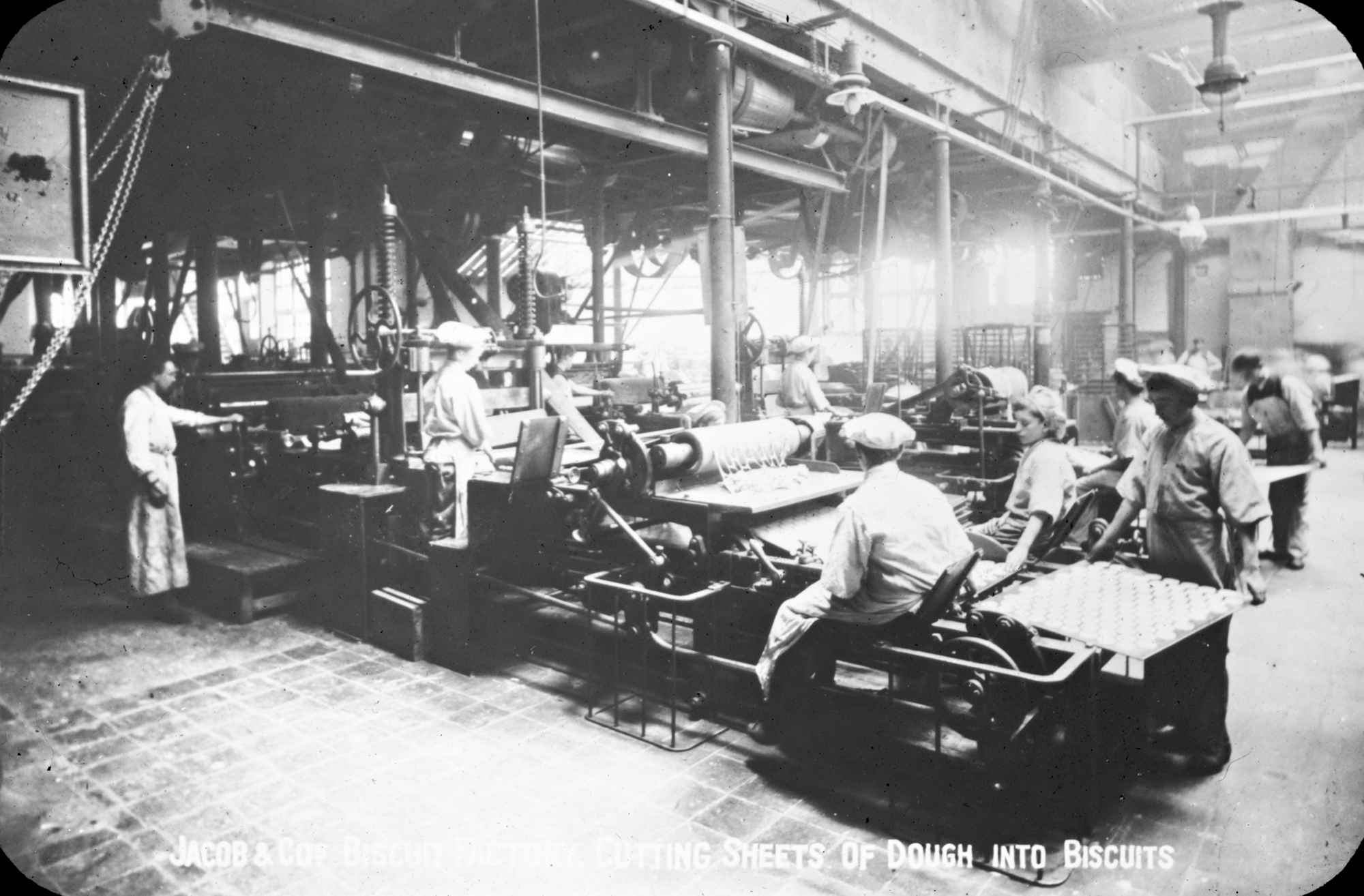
View of the production floor, Jacob's Ireland factory, 1910

Jacob's originated in the mid-nineteenth century as a small bread and sea-biscuit bakery run by William Beale Jacob in Waterford, Ireland. William's brother Robert joined the business in 1851, forming the partnership of W. & R. Jacob. In 1852, the brothers acquired new premises at Peter's Row in Dublin, Ireland, and in 1853 opened the W. & R. Jacob's Steam Biscuit Factory. The Dublin factory was one of several prominent buildings occupied by rebels during the Easter Rising in 1916.

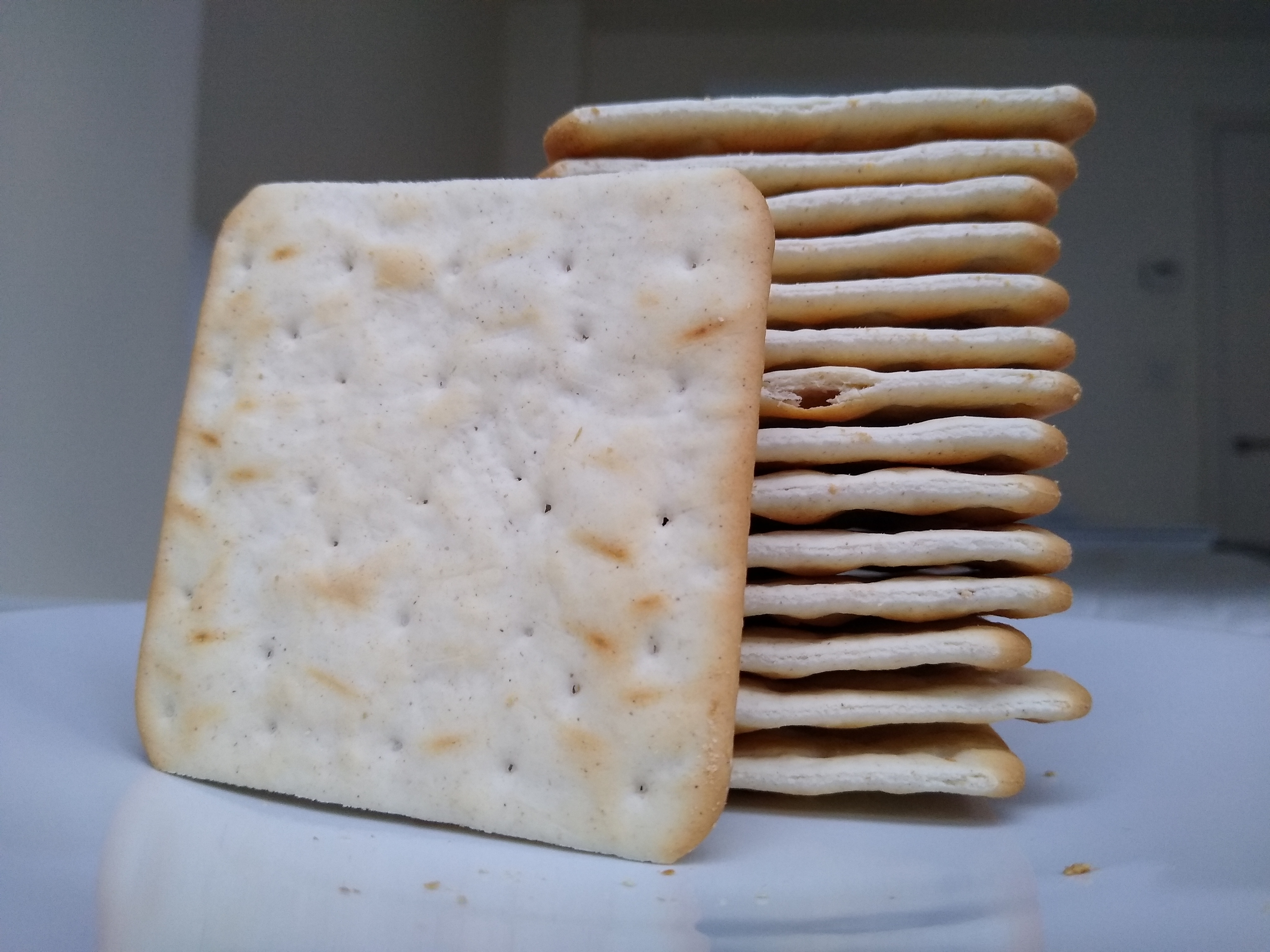
Jacob's cream crackers

Jacob's first English factory opened in 1914 in Aintree, Liverpool, and remains the primary UK producer of Jacob's products including Cream Crackers and Twiglets. In 1922, a separate English company was formed and the Dublin and Liverpool branches separated. After the separation, the Dublin branch retained the name W. & R. Jacob while the Liverpool branch became known as Jacob's Bakery Ltd.

From the 1960s to the early 2000s, both bakeries underwent a series of mergers. In 1960, Jacob's Bakery joined Associated Biscuits, which was purchased by Nabisco in 1982. Associated Biscuits was subsequently acquired by Danone in 1989 and renamed The Jacob's Bakery Ltd. Meanwhile, W. & R. Jacob merged with Boland's Bakery in the 1970s to form Irish Biscuits Ltd., and in 1973 moved to a factory in the Dublin suburb of Tallaght.

In 1991, the two companies again came under common ownership when Danone also acquired Irish Biscuits. In 2004, Danone and United Biscuits announced that they had agreed for the latter to acquire the UK and Ireland operations of Irish Biscuits and Jacob's Biscuits brands, known collectively as the Jacob's Biscuit Group. Just days after the acquisition was announced, however, Danone, United Biscuits, and Fruitfield Foods reported that Jacob's Biscuit Group would be split, with United Biscuits acquiring only the UK portion of the group and Fruitfield Foods acquiring the Irish portion. Fruitfield Foods was subsequently renamed the Jacob Fruitfield Food Group; Michael Carey was CEO and part-owner . Other major shareholders include Lioncourt with a 36% stake.

In 2007, Jacobs took McVities to court for infringement of copyright. McVities launched Cream Crackers and Fig Rolls in the Irish market in similar packaging. It was revealed that McVities were also making the same products under contract for Jacobs and had even designed Jacobs labels for them.

In May 2009, Jacobs ceased production of biscuits at its home in Tallaght. Production was moved to Portugal, Poland, the UK, France and Malta for cost reasons. Some minor production remains in Ireland with Wafer biscuits made in County Donegal, Real Irish products in Drogheda and premium oat biscuits in County Cork. 220 people lost their jobs as a result of the closure in 2009.

Jacob Fruitfield Food Group is now part of the Valeo Food Group, which was established in September 2010 through the merger of Batchelors and Origin Foods. It is the owner of brands that project an Irish identity - despite now being made elsewhere, with the factories in Tallaght and Ringsend all closed. Brands such as Jacob's, Bolands and Chef were all once made in Ireland, but are now imported. Products such as "Old Time Irish" marmalade continue to be sold on the Irish market, despite no longer being produced in Ireland.

In November 2014, United Biscuits, including the UK Jacob's brand, was acquired by Turkish conglomerate Yıldız Holding. In January 2016, United Biscuits was brought under Pladis, Yildiz Holding's new global snacking subsidiary. United Biscuits' UK operating business subsequently became Pladis (UK) Limited.

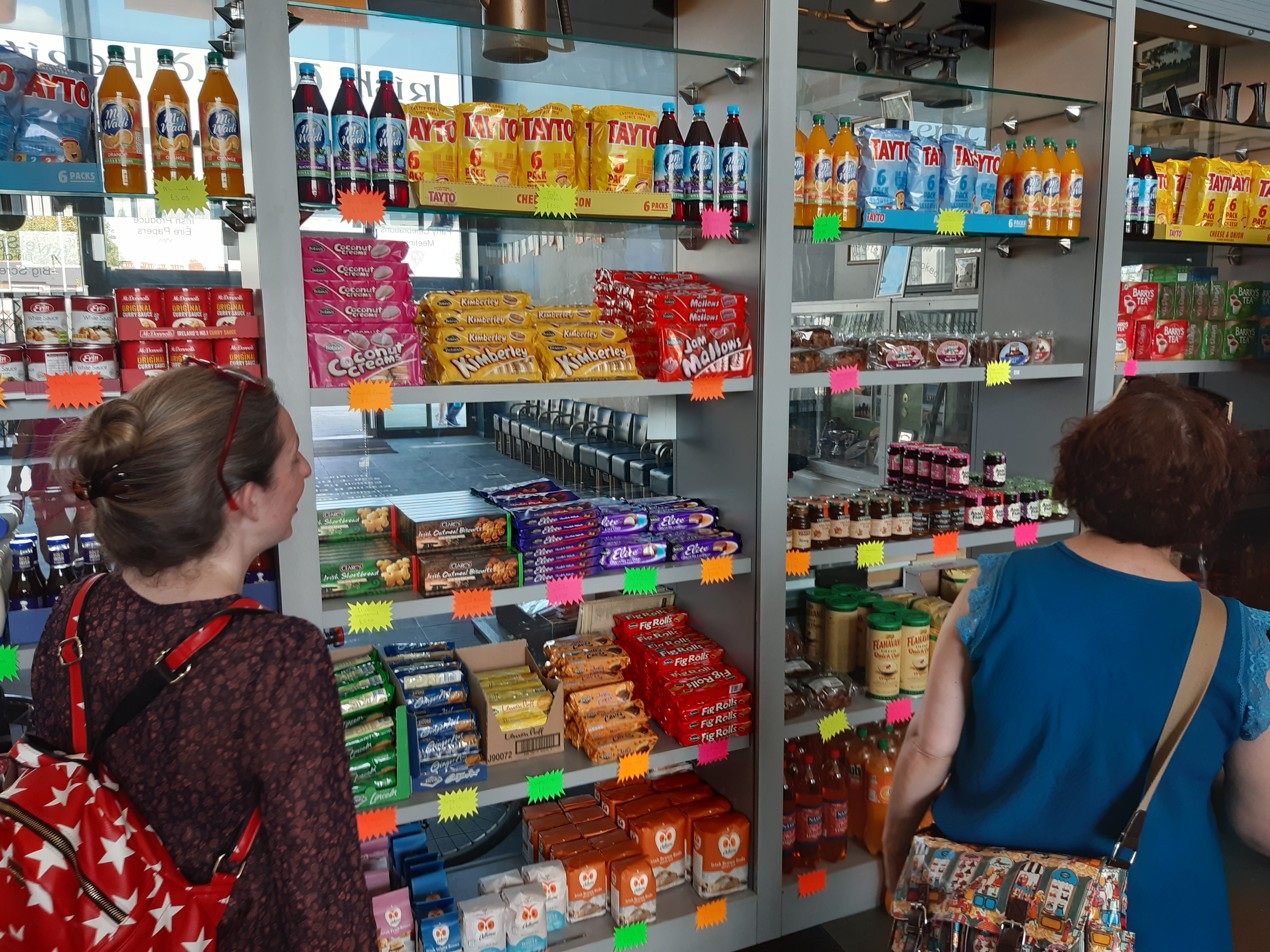
Irish visitors to Manchester peruse Irish products for sale, including Jacob's biscuits, at the Irish World Heritage Centre, Cheetham Hill

Outside of the UK and Ireland, Danone retained Jacob's brand ownership in Asia, operating a manufacturing facility in Malaysia until its biscuit division was acquired by Kraft Foods in 2007. Following that acquisition, production and sales of Jacob's biscuits in Malaysia are undertaken by Mondelēz International.

In 2015, the Jacob's factory in Liverpool reported producing over 55,000 tonnes of products each year, and in 2022 reported producing 4,000 tonnes of crackers each year. In 2015, the Liverpool factory received a £10 million investment from United Biscuits to boost output further.

In 2026, the company marks its 175th anniversary.

=== Industrial relations ===
The activist and trade union organiser Rosie Hackett worked as a messenger at Jacob's for some years in the early twentieth century. At that time, working conditions in the Dublin factory were poor. On 22 August 1911, Hackett helped organise the withdrawal of women's labour in the Jacob's factory to support their male colleagues who were already on strike. With the women's help, the men secured better working conditions and a pay rise. Two weeks later, at the age of eighteen, Hackett co-founded the Irish Women Workers' Union (IWWU) with Delia Larkin. During the 1913 Dublin lock-out, Hackett helped mobilise workers at Jacob's to come out in solidarity with other workers; Jacob's workers were, in turn, locked out by their own employers. In 1914, Jacob's sacked Hackett for her role in the lock-out.

In 2009, after 156 years of making biscuits in Ireland, Jacob Fruitfield shut its Tallaght plant. As a result of the closure, 220 jobs were lost, with the company retaining around 100 staff in a variety of roles.

In November 2022, workers at the Aintree factory went on strike after three months of pay negotiations with management failed to reach an agreement. Workers were on strike for 11 weeks, backed by the GMB union. During the strike, the company temporarily shifted some production to Portugal. In 2023, Pladis announced plans for job cuts, beginning with a phase of voluntary redundancies through the end of 2025. GMB reported that 361 of around 760 workers were to be made redundant under the plan.

== Products ==
=== Toppable crackers ===
- Cream crackers
- Biscuits For Cheese
- Savoury Favourites
- Flatbreads
  - Salt & Pepper
  - Mixed Seeds
- Crispbreads
  - Chive
  - Mixed Seed
  - Mixed Grain
- Ciabatta
  - Sundried Tomato & Basil
  - Original
- Krackawheat
- Choice Grain
- Sourdough
- Butter Puffs
- Cornish Wafers
- High Fibre

=== Snackable crackers ===
- Savours
  - Salt and Pepper
  - Sour Cream & Chive
  - Cheese
  - Sweet Chilli
- Cheddars
  - Pickle
  - Cheese
  - Smoky BBQ

=== Mini Cheddars ===
- Mini Cheddars Original 6 Pack
- Mini Cheddars Red Leicester 6 Pack
- Mini Cheddars Smoky BBQ 6 Pack
- Mini Cheddars Nacho Cheese & Jalapeño
- Mini Cheddars Chipotle Chicken Wings
- Mini Cheddars Lime & Chilli
- Mini Cheddars Strathdon Blue Cheese
- Mini Cheddars Dragon's Breath Chilli Cheddar
- Mini Cheddars Ploughman's Cheshire Cheese

=== Mini Cheddars Sticks ===
- Rich & Tangy Cheddar
- Grilled Cheddar & Sizzling Steak

=== Cracker Crisps ===
- Salt & Vinegar
- Sour Cream & Chive
- Sour Cream & Chive Caddies

=== Bites ===
- Red Leicester
- Mature Cheddar & Caramelised Onion
- Smoked Paprika
- Sweet Chilli & Sour Cream

=== Crinklys ===
- Variety Pack (6 Pack including 2 × Cheese & Onion, 2 × Chilli Beef and 2 × Salt & Vinegar)
- Cheese & Onion 6 Pack

=== Twiglets ===
- Twiglets Multipack
- Twiglets Caddies

=== Cheeselets ===
- Cheeselets Caddies
- Cheeselets 125g

=== Mallow biscuits ===
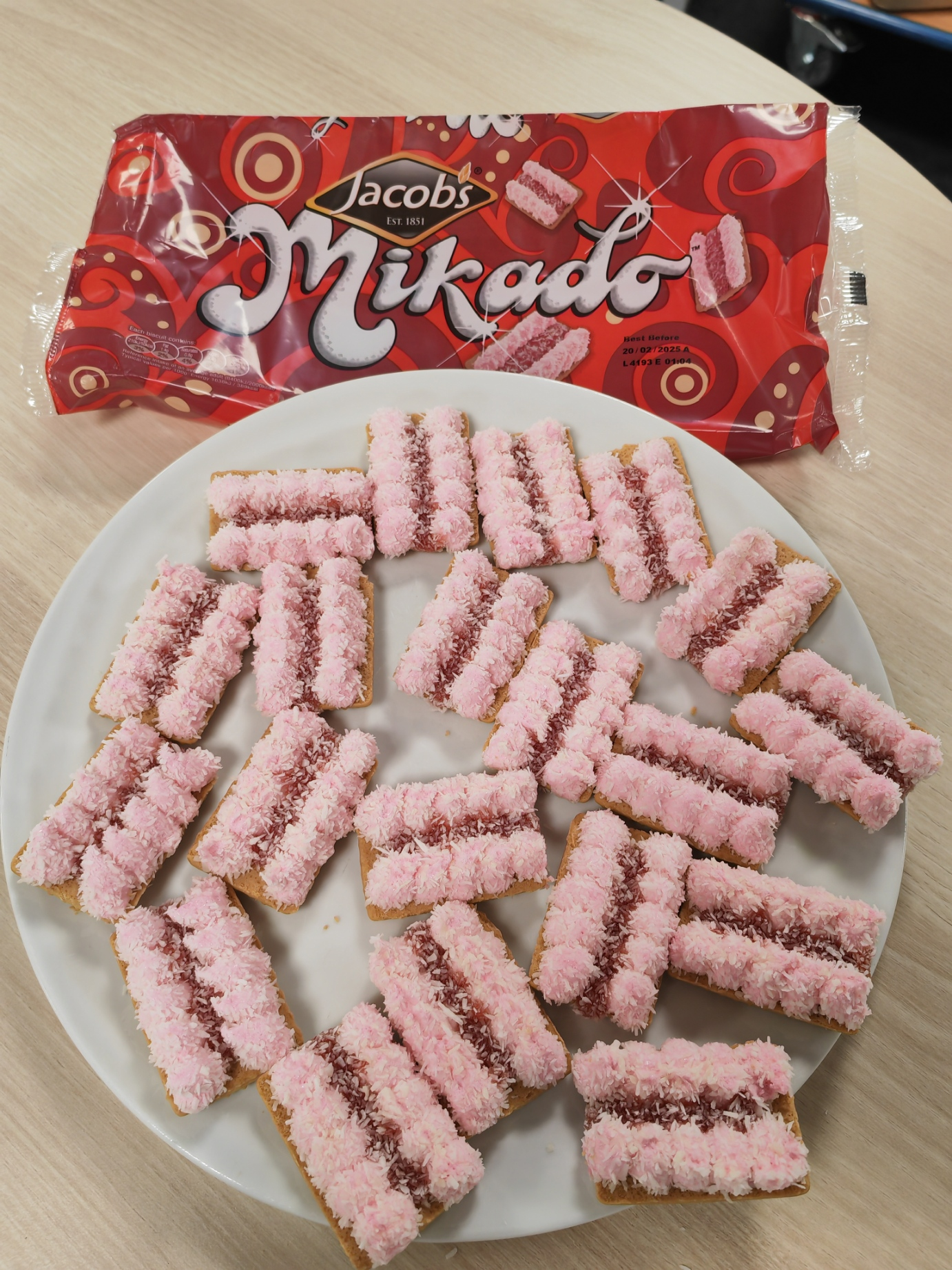
A package of Jacob's Mikado biscuits.

- Mikado, featuring marshmallow, desiccated coconut and raspberry jam
- Kimberley, ginger flavour biscuits sandwiching a mallow center, which has a coarse sugar crystal coating
- Elite, a chocolate-enrobed Mikado. (Other Elite variants are available.)
- Coconut cream, biscuits with a Pink and White a mallow center and a desiccated coconut coating
- X's & O's, sold in phases during the 1970s and 1990s
- Camelot, square version of Mikado, sold during the late 1980s and early 1990s
- Chocolate Mallows

=== Other biscuits ===
- Digestive
- Fig Rolls; during the late 1980s, Jacob's also sold Fruity Bites, followed by Apple Rolls in the early to mid-1990s. They sold a Chocolate version of them in the mid-1990s and a bar version in the early 2000s
- Polo
- Rich Tea
- Shortbread
- Shortcake, originally sold from the late 1970s to the early 1990s, returned to stores in 2026.
- Goldgrain
- Crunchers, originally sold in the 1980s and 1990s, returned to stores in 2025.
- Rings
- Ginger Nut
- Lincoln
- Hovis
- Marietta
- Windmill lasted for a short time in the early 1980s
- Lemon Puff
- Custard cream
- Bourbon
- Nice
- Wafer used for an ice cream sandwich
- Jaffa Cakes

=== Bars ===
- Club Milk has Dark, Original, Orange, Mint, and White Chocolate versions, as well as Wafer and Chunky versions
- Trio
- Busker (1984–1987)
- Telax sold during the late 1970s and most of the 1980s

== Advertising ==
From the mid-1970s onward, Jacob's ran a number of television advertising campaigns, particularly in Ireland. One Irish campaign used the phrase "How To Get The Fig Into The Fig Rolls".

In the late 1970s and early 1980s, Frank Kelly and Maureen Potter appeared in a series of adverts, including one in which a German professor, played by Kelly, disputes the pronunciation of "Jacob's" while in South America.

A mid-1970s campaign for Club Milk used the slogan "best after all", and a mid-1980s campaign for Telax bars used a space-science theme.

In the late 1980s and early 1990s, Jacob's used the slogan "Take The Biscuit".

The Chocolate Collection was advertised in 1992 with the slogan "It's The Same Chocolate With A Different Biscuit Under It", and Camelot biscuits were advertised around the same time with a cartoon themed on the Children of Lir.

In the late 2000s, "Some Kind of Wonderful" was used as a slogan.

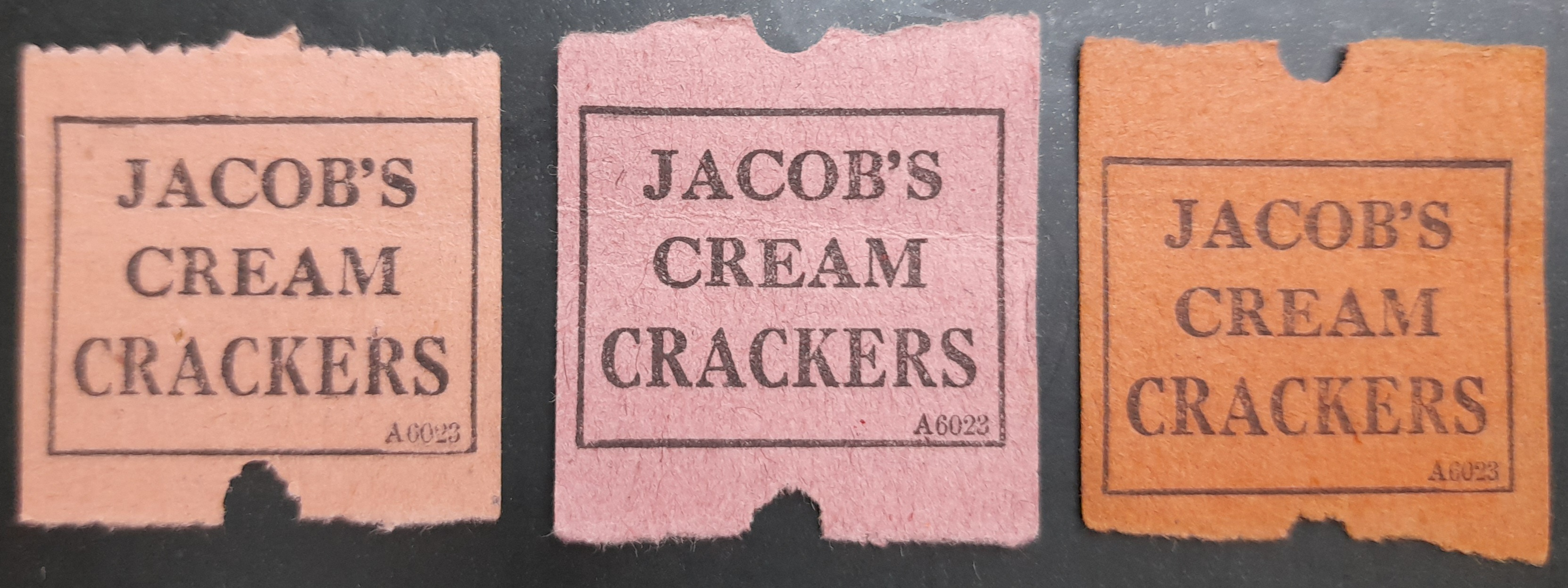
Jacob's Cream Crackers adverts on the backs of pre-decimal Isle of Man bus tickets.

In the pre-decimal era (before 1971), Jacob's Cream Crackers were advertised on the backs of bus tickets on the Isle of Man.

In 2026 back adverting to celebrate 175th anniversary.

== See also ==
- Jacob's Awards
