= Brian O'Neill (journalist) =

Irish journalist & author

Brian O'Neill was an Irish journalist and Communist activist who worked mostly in London and Dublin between the 1920s and the 1970s.

== Life ==
O'Neill's origins are uncertain, with conflicting sources suggesting he was possibly born in the United States or England. In the early 1930s, John Charles McQuaid, Dean and President of Blackrock College, Dublin, later to become Archbishop of Dublin, had a Vigilance Committee which kept an eye on journalists active in Ireland, and it reported to McQuaid that O'Neill had trained in Moscow on Pravda and had gone on to work at the All Russian Co-operative Society in London until 1927, when it was broken up by the British, who saw it as a Soviet trade and espionage agency. According to the report, he then moved on to Glasgow, where he was in trouble with the police, and in 1931 arrived in Dublin, where he took the new name of Brian O'Neill and worked as a journalist and as a paid activist and pamphleteer of the Communist Party.

The Irish Workers' Voice, a communist Irish newspaper, was relaunched soon after the W. T. Cosgrave government fell in March 1932, with O'Neill as its editor. By the beginning of 1933, O'Neill was also the Ireland correspondent of Reynold's News, a left-wing English Sunday newspaper owned by the Co-operative Press, and was a leading member of the Revolutionary Workers' Groups (RWG), later to become the Communist Party of Ireland. In late March 1933, the RWG headquarters, Connolly House in Great James Street, was attacked by a mob, and O'Neill played the leading part in the defence of the building, armed with a woodman's axe.

Also in 1933, O'Neill published a book, The War for the Land in Ireland, with an introduction by Peadar O'Donnell, who said in his introduction "… it is not without significance that this task is undertaken by Brian O'Neill, a member of the youthful Communist movement in Ireland." In the book, O'Neill concluded that peasant land ownership of economically viable holdings would not solve what he saw as the fundamental problem of the land. The solution he proposed was a "radical inroad on property rights", with Irish agriculture developing on the Soviet socialist pattern.

In a memorandum of the Irish Department of Justice in 1936, O'Neill was reported to be originally from Manchester, educated at University College Dublin, a member of the Central Executive Committee of the Communist Party of Ireland, and at the time teaching "The ABC of Communism" as a lecturer at the Workers' College.

In 1939, Mairin Mitchell was highly critical of the Irish leftists, including O'Neill, for their views on the Molotov–Ribbentrop Pact, and wrote to Desmond Ryan in September "Brian O'Neill, Bloomsbury, and Daiken will sing Russia right or wrong."

In 1941, O'Neill was still editor of The Irish Workers' Voice, the Communist newspaper, but it folded that year when the Communist Party of Ireland split and ceased to function, soon after the Soviet Union was forced into the Second World War.

In 1942, O'Neill was taken on as a journalist by The Irish Press, and by the late 1940s he was the newspaper's Foreign News Editor. On 3 February 1948, a Third Secretary at the US Legation in Dublin, R. M. Beaudry, reported a conversation with Father McLaughlin of Boyle, County Roscommon, who considered that The Irish Press had been infiltrated by "communistic elements", including O'Neill. He said O'Neill had been born in New Jersey and was also writing for the Communist Party USA’s Daily Worker (Note: O'Neill was credited for at least one article in the Daily Worker, a 1932 piece about the de Valera government) and was a foreign correspondent for the Soviet news agency TASS.

During the Emergency, the Irish Directorate of Military Intelligence was concerned about The Irish Press having O’Neill, Maire Comerford, R. M. Fox, Geoffrey Coulter, and Tom Mullins on its staff.

In 1964, O'Neill wrote a tribute to Leslie Daiken (1912–1964), and he was still working for The Irish Press in the 1970s.

In 1971, O’Neill was involved in a public dispute about the authenticity of the "Castle document", which Thomas Kelly of Sinn Féin had read to Dublin Corporation in April 1916, claiming it had been leaked from Dublin Castle and detailed British plans to arrest leaders of the Irish Volunteers, Sinn Féin, and the Gaelic League. In an article in The Irish Press of 15 April 1971, O’Neill quoted an answer given in the House of Commons to the effect that the document had been a ruse de guerre. In reply, Geraldine Plunkett Dillon insisted the document had been genuine and had been decoded by her brother, Joseph Plunkett; and Síle Nic Ghabhann, writing in Irish, defended her father, Eugene Smyth, who had claimed to have leaked the document. On 29 April, O’Neill responded, citing Desmond Ryan, Diarmuid Lynch, Maureen Wall, Leon Ó Broin, and F. X. Martin, and insisted that the document had been a forgery by Joseph Plunkett and Sean Mac Diarmada. A 21st-century assessment by Fearghal McGarry is that the Castle document was an edited version of a genuine one leaked by Smyth outlining British plans in the event of conscription.
