= Helen Chenevix =

Irish suffragist and trade unionist

Helen Sophia Chenevix
- Born: 13 November 1886
- Died: 4 March 1963 (aged 76)
- Resting place: Deansgrange Cemetery
- Education: Alexandra College, Trinity College Dublin
- Known for: Her work as a suffragette and trade unionist
- Parent(s): Henry Chenevix, Charlotte Sophia Ormsby

Helen Sophia Chenevix (13 November 1886 – 4 March 1963) was an Irish suffragist and trade unionist. In 1911, she worked with Louie Bennett to form the Irish Women's Suffrage Federation. The two later founded the Irish Women Workers' Union.

Chenevix was also elected to Dublin Corporation, and twice served as acting Lord Mayor of Dublin in 1942 and 1950. In 1951, she served as President of the Irish Trades Union Congress, and from 1955 to 1957 she was Secretary of the Women Workers' Union. She was also active in the International League for Peace and Freedom and the Irish Pacifist Movement.

== Early life ==
Helen Sophia Chenevix was born on 13 November 1886 in Blackrock, County Dublin, and was the daughter of Henry Chenevix, a Bishop in The Church of Ireland and possibly a descendant of the Irish chemist Richard Chenevix. Her mother was Charlotte Sophia, née Ormsby.

Chenevix attended Alexandra College in Milltown in Dublin, where fellow suffragist and partner Louie Bennett had obtained her education twenty years previously. Chenevix subsequently continued her studies at Trinity College where she was a part of the first group of women to graduate and attain a B.A degree in 1909. Chenevix became interested and immersed in the suffragette movement and was a key member in the Irish Women's Suffrage Federation. Chenevix helmed many marches and debates on the subject of women's rights, in regular collaboration with fellow suffragist Bennett, whom she partnered with in most political activities. From 1911, socialism and feminism were growing movements, and many feminists were of a socialist political view. This led to the popular support of suffragette associations during the 1910s and a rise in support for Chenevix and the Irish Women's Suffrage Federation.

== Career ==
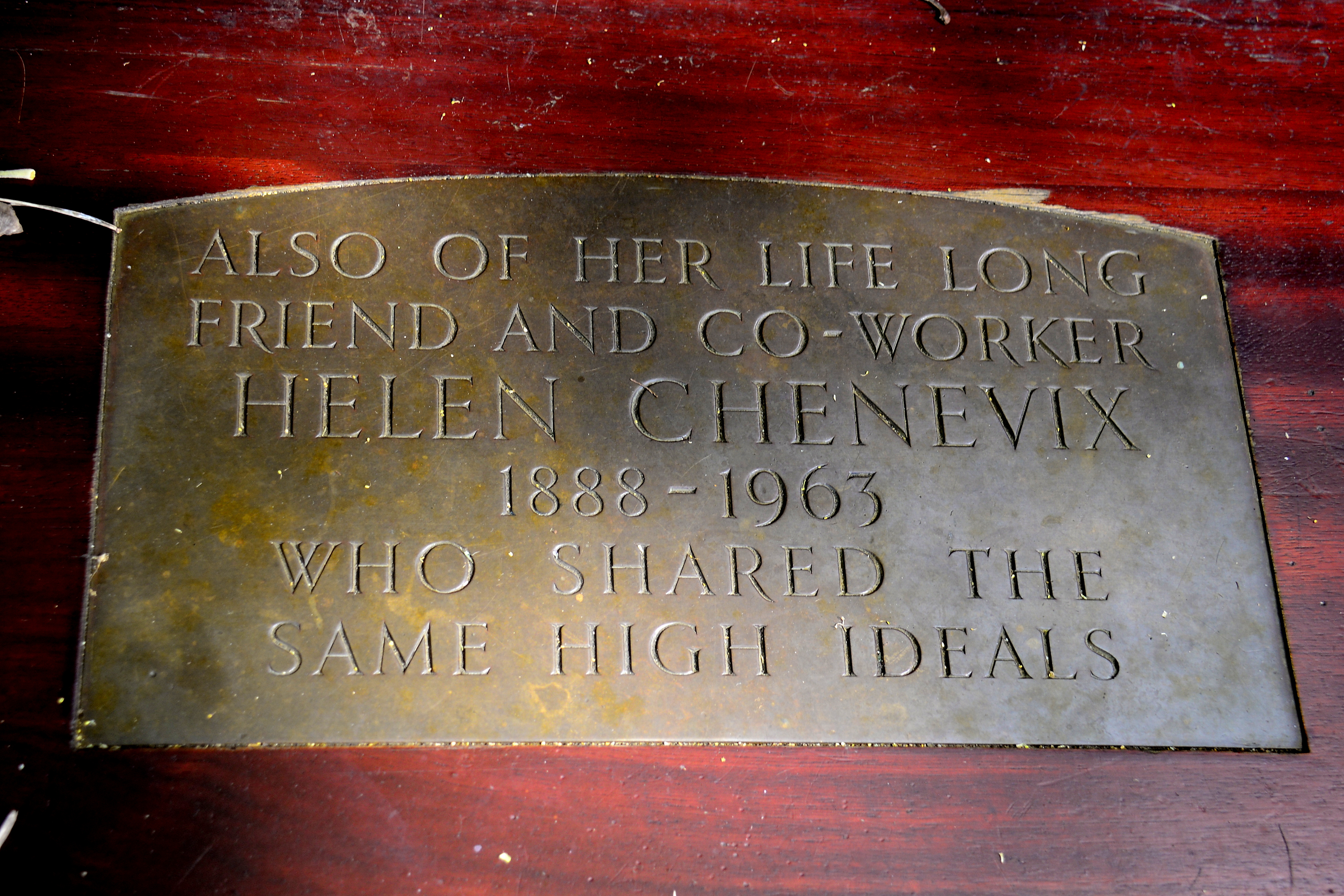
Louie Bennett and Helen Chenevix seat, St Stephen's Green, Dublin

Chenevix was a women's rights activist. In 1911 she co-founded the Irish Women's Suffrage Federation, which supported the foundation of Dublin's Irish Women's Reform League and Belfast's Women's Suffrage Society. Chenevix believed the school leaving age should be raised to 16 years of age and campaigned for this to be changed in the 1920s. She understood the struggles that poorer families had and demanded financial compensation for them.

Helen co-founded the Irish Women's Workers Union in 1916, and by 1918 it was recognised as a trade union, with over 5,000 members. They aimed to support women working in poor working conditions. They negotiated with employers for better pay and working hours.

In 1945, Chenevix, Bennett and other members of the Irish Women's Workers' Union began a strike over the poor working conditions employees had to endure whilst working in the laundries. This successful strike lasted 3 months in total, and the whole nation was awarded with two weeks paid annual holidays at the end. Chenevix and Bennett were highly praised for being "strong, powerful women" for managing and maintaining the strike.

In 1949, Chenevix served as vice president to the Irish Trade Union Congress and in 1951 she was appointed president.

Chenevix was also elected to Dublin Corporation, and twice served as acting Lord Mayor of Dublin (in 1942 and 1950). She was also active in the Women's International League for Peace and Freedom and the Irish Pacifist Movement.

After Bennett's retirement in 1955, Chenevix acquired her position as general secretary of the Irish Women Workers' Union.

== Later life and death ==
After she retired from the Irish Women Workers' Union in 1957, Chenevix concentrated on working for peace and nuclear disarmament.

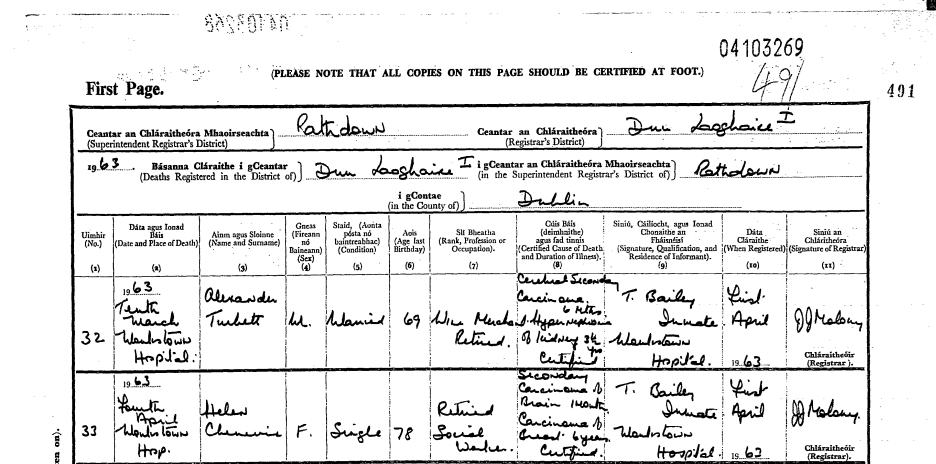
Death certificate of Helen Chenevix

A memorable event in Chenevix's later life was her input at a conference of the Irish Trade Union Congress and the Irish Congress of Trade Unions. A heated argument broke out amongst delegates, suggesting that the idea of world peace was a "communist" ideal. As Chenevix, a "frail, gentle, grey-haired figure", approached the stand, the conference was in uproar. As she spoke calmly and convincingly for the need for peace, the disorder began to die. Once she had finished, the room broke out into a storm of thunderous applause. Her resolution, which had previously been viewed as "communist", was finally recognised and passed unanimously.

Chenevix worked tirelessly throughout her life to fight for women's rights, to improve working conditions for Irish women and for the right to live in a peaceful world without war or disruption. As she worked right up to her death, she was appointed a member of the Industrial Accidents Commission just three days before her bereavement.

She died of brain cancer on 4 March 1963 in Walkinstown Hospital, She was buried in Deansgrange cemetery on 7 March of the same year. Her funeral was held in Monkstown Parish Church and was conducted by the Reverend RWM Wynne. Amongst those who attended the funeral were members of the Dáil and Senate, representatives of the Trade Union movement and many of Chenevix's personal friends.

== Personal life ==
Chenevix was the only child of her parents, Henry and Sophia. They were a comfortable South Dublin family that had no financial difficulties as her father was the Bishop of the Church of Ireland. She was still living with her parents in the family home in Dublin when she founded the Irish Women's Suffrage Federation with Bennett.

Chenevix and Bennett were constant companions, leading to speculation that the pair were romantically involved. It is now assumed that they were a couple. It has been said that the couple were part of an influential network of lesbians living in Dublin. Bennett moved into the house beside Chenevix, and they also lived together for a period of time with Chenevix caring for Bennett before she died from an illness in 1956. In Pax et Libertas, Chenevix wrote that Bennett was "the best loved woman in Dublin" and "Peace and Freedom were here twin ideals".

Chenevix died on 4 March 1963.

== Legacy ==
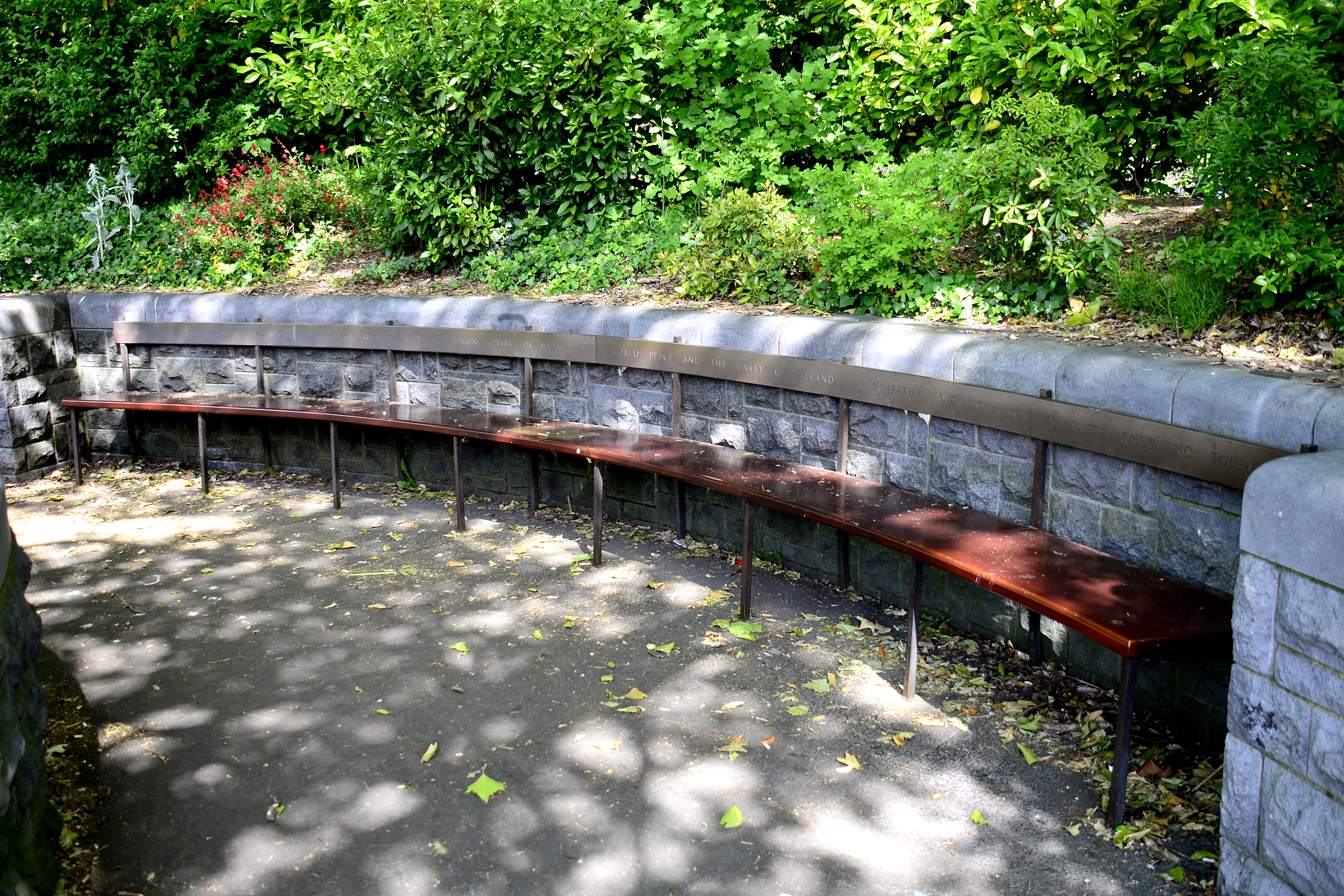
Louie Bennett and Helen Chenevix seat, St Stephen's Green Park, Dublin

A bench has been placed in St Stephens Green park in honour of Chenevix and Bennett for their hard work in fighting for women's rights. The bench reads, 'Also of her lifelong friend and co-worker Helen Chenevix, 1888 - 1963 who shared the same high ideals,'. The two women were described as "Two of the most remarkable Irish women of this century" after Chenevix's death. A memorial in The Irish Times newspaper said that Chenevix "will be missed not only for the work she did, but for the noble qualities she possessed. Her friends will have a deep and irreparable sense of loss".

A walking tour was organised by Ingenious Ireland on International Women's Day 2015 to celebrate the lives of Chenevix, Bennett, Helena Molony and Kathleen Clarke and to honour their work on behalf of the laundries. The tour was entitled "Obstreporous Lassies" and focused on the work the Irish Women Workers' Union.

== See also ==
- List of peace activists

Trade union offices
Preceded by Louie Bennett	Secretary of the Irish Women Workers' Union; 1955–1957	Succeeded by Kay McDowell
Preceded by Sam Kyle	President of the Irish Trades Union Congress; 1951	Succeeded by James Larkin Jnr
