= Kay McDowell =

Irish trade union leader

Kathleen "Kay" McDowell
- Born: Kathleen Mary McDowell; 16 August 1897; Phibsborough, Dublin, Ireland
- Died: 7 March 1975 (aged 77); Jervis Street Hospital, Dublin, Ireland
- Occupation: trade union leader

Kathleen "Kay" McDowell (16 August 1897 – 7 March 1975) was an Irish trade union leader.

== Early life and family ==
Kay McDowell was born Kathleen Mary McDowell on 16 August 1897 at 20 Connaught Street, Phibsborough, Dublin. Her parents were William, a wine merchant, and Mary McDowell (née Kirwan). McDowell's paternal family came from Ulster, and owned a chain of off-licences and grocery stores on the northside of Dublin. Her grandfather, William J. McDowell, was a journalist who edited the Belfast Morning News before moving to Dublin in 1883 to join the staff of the Freeman's Journal. He eventually became the editor, but was dismissed when he supported Charles Stewart Parnell, and sued the paper for wrongful dismissal, the first successful case of this kind in Ireland. McDowell and her younger brother, Willie, were orphaned at a young age. They were raised by their paternal grandfather, at 11 Charleville Rd and at 11 Belfast Terrace, North Circular Road. After their grandfather died, she and her brother remained at Belfast Terrace, living with relatives.

McDowell attended the Holy Faith convent, Glasnevin. She later studied commerce at a technical school in Bray, County Wicklow and at Rosses College, Skerries, County Dublin. She was deeply affected by the death of her brother in France in 1918 during World War I. This led to her abandoning her plans to work for her paternal uncle who was a Dublin solicitor, and she instead moved to London to work for a law firm there. She returned to Dublin in 1921, bowing to pressure from her family, who were against an unsuitable marriage she was considering.

== Career ==
Her uncle was solicitor to the Irish Women Workers' Union (IWWU), and it was through him that she was introduced to Louie Bennett, the union's general secretary. In 1922 McDowell joined the staff of the union as an organiser. She was assigned as supervisor of the clerical works in the union's office in 1923, with the aim of rationalising all administrative procedures and cutting operational costs. Over time, McDowell held numerous administrative and official positions within the union, with specific interest in representing and working with mental health nurses, textile workers, and printers. In 1941, she was appointed the IWWU representative to the council of action formed by Dublin Trades Council (DTC) which was organised to oppose the Irish government's trade union bill. During the course of this work, McDowell highlighted the danger the bill held for smaller trade unions with the requirement of monetary deposits in the high court before negotiating licences could be secured, which would have the effect of freezing a large portion of a union's assets.

In 1948, McDowell was one of the founders of The People's College, and sat on the first central council. She was the chair of the DTC's women's council of action in the late 1940s. When Bennett became IWWU consultative secretary in August 1950, McDowell became a joint acting secretary with Helen Chenevix. From January 1951 to May 1954, McDowell took an extended leave of absence to sit on the government's prices advisory committee. When Bennett retired, McDowell became IWWU assistant general secretary, serving under Chenevix from 1955 to 1957. She succeeded Chenevix as the union's general secretary in 1957, a position she held until 1969. In comparison to Bennett, McDowell was seen as a very democratic leader, known to often defer to her members by saying "Now it's over to you ladies."

During McDowell's tenure, many of the industries represented by the union saw widespread automation, leading to part-time or irregular shift work, which was often taken up by married women returning to the workforce. The IWWU under McDowell opposed many of these practices initially, but later negotiated the introduction of a shorter working week in combination with wage increases, better job security, and demarcation for women in full-time work. She protested gendered pay scales, which saw women paid less than male counterparts, as well as lower cost-of-living allowances allocated to women than men, arguing that the cost of living was the same regardless of gender. In 1964, she was sceptical of the national wage agreement that had been worked out between Irish unions and employers, primarily as it did not give women the £1 minimum basic increase guaranteed to men.

In 1958, McDowell became the first woman to sit on the administrative council of the Labour Party. She was elected to the first national executive of the newly formed Irish Congress of Trade Unions (ICTU) in 1959, serving on the Congress's committee on industrial organisation throughout the 1960s. This led to accusations that she was in discussions to merge IWWU into a larger union, which she strenuously denied. She was convinced that the women's union was necessary as she noted that male negotiators from other unions always accepted wage settlements that agreed to women's pay being 50% that of men's, while IWWU secured 75% for women. Despite this, IWWU's numbers continued to decline from a peak in 1950 of 6700 to 3550 in 1970. During her time as head of the union, McDowell saw a ten-week lockout of IWWU members in printing in 1965, and in 1966 a strike of sugar confectioners. The IWWU secured a successful claim in the labour court against ICTU in 1967 on behalf of female clerical workers in ICTU who were paid less than the scheduled rate. IWWU negotiated improvements for its members in the late 1960s in areas including increases in marriage benefit, strike pay, sick pay, and the introduction of retirement bonuses. After her retirement from IWWU in 1970, she was succeeded by Maura Breslin.

McDowell lived on Northumberland Road, Dublin, and later at 57 Pembroke Road. She died in Jervis Street Hospital on 7 March 1975, and is buried in Deans Grange Cemetery.

Trade union offices
Preceded by Helen Chenevix	Secretary of the Irish Women Workers' Union; 1957-1970	Succeeded by Maura Breslin
