= Padraigín Ní Mhurchú =

Irish trade union leader (1949–2019)

- Born: 20 February 1949
- Died: 4 June 2019 (aged 70)

Padraigín Ní Mhurchú (20 February 1949 – 4 June 2019) was an Irish trade union leader.

Born in Rakeeragh, County Monaghan, Ní Mhurchú was educated at St Louis Girls' National School in Carrickmacross. She joined the Irish Civil Service in 1967 and joined the Civil Service Executive Union, serving on its executive committee from 1972. This inspired her to focus full-time on trade unionism, and she became an assistant branch secretary for the Workers' Union of Ireland (WUI), soon being promoted to branch secretary. She also served on the Women's Advisory Committee of the Irish Congress of Trade Unions (ICTU).

In 1980, Ní Mhurchú was appointed as deputy general secretary of the Irish Women Workers' Union, then became general secretary in 1982. With the union having a falling membership and financial difficulties, Ní Mhurchú refocused its activity on recruiting part-time workers, then in 1985 arranged for it to merge into the WUI.

In 1984, Ní Mhurchú became the first woman to serve on the Labour Court, appointed by the ICTU, serving until 2012. In the early 1990s, she undertook a law degree at Trinity College Dublin, but suffered a brain haemorrhage and stroke in 1992, leading to her spending more than a year in hospital.

Trade union offices
Preceded by Maura Breslin	General Secretary of the Irish Women Workers' Union; 1982–1985	Succeeded by Union merged
