= Sheila Conroy =

Irish trade union leader and activist

- Born: Sheila Williams; 22 April 1918; Bantry, County Cork, Ireland
- Died: 11 May 2012 (aged 94); Tara Care Centre, Bray, County Wicklow
- Occupations: trade union leader, activist

Sheila Conroy (22 April 1918 – 11 May 2012) was an Irish trade union leader and activist. She was the first women elected to the Irish Transport and General Workers' Union's national executive committee and in 1976 she became chair of the RTÉ Authority, making her the first woman to chair an Irish semi-state body.

== Early life and education ==
Sheila Conroy was born Sheila Williams in Bantry, County Cork on 22 April 1918 (or possibly 4 April 1917). She was the only child of Harry and Jane Williams. Her father was a Welsh petty officer in the Royal Navy who was stationed in Bantry from 1914 to 1918. Her mother's family disowned her due to the marriage. After the death of her mother from tuberculosis soon after Conroy was born, she was fostered by a local family until she was 6, with her father sending an allowance from his new posting. She had suffered from pneumonia as an infant, and was cared for by and later attended the national school of the Sisters of Mercy in Bantry. She moved to the convent in Cobh, where she attended St Maries of the Isle secondary school in Cork city. She suffered further ill health, throat infections and scarlet fever, which led to her leaving school after a year at age 14. She never tried to make contact with her maternal family, fearing they would reject her.

== Early career and union work ==
She was apprenticed to a small confectionery firm in Cork in 1937, with the allowance from her father paying for her accommodation. She lost that job in 1939, and took up a position as a trainee waitress at the Victoria Hotel, Cork. Owing to the working conditions at the hotel, Conroy organised a secret operation to affiliate the staff with the Irish Transport and General Workers' Union (ITGWU). She moved to Dublin in 1944, working at the Capitol Theatre as a waitress and started studying at the College of Catering on Cathal Brugha Street. She was the shop steward for ITGWU members at the Capitol, and became involved in the union's branch which served hotel, restaurant and catering staff (no. 4 branch) in Dublin, the membership of which was predominately women. At the 1952 AGM, she was elected to the branch committee, and was a delegate at the ITGWU annual conference in the summer of the same year.

Conroy was disappointed by the low attendance of women members at the union's annual conference in 1953, noting that if the ITGWU women members organised separately, they would be the second largest union in Ireland after the ITGWU. In 1954, she was the only woman delegate at the Congress of Irish Unions, when she commented that the marriage bar never affected women in low-status, low-paid jobs in catering, retail, cleaning, or domestic service. Conroy was the first woman elected to the ITGWU's national executive committee (NEC) in June 1955. At the Labour Court she negotiated on behalf of her branch that same year, and helped establish regional sectoral industrial councils to set wages and employment conditions, as well as campaigning for the creation of a national pension scheme for all workers. She topped the poll at the NEC elections in 1958, acknowledging that this meant a large amount of men voted for her.

She and the union's general president, John Conroy, introduced new rules regarding the payment of marriage gratuities to women members at the ITGWU congress in 1958. They married on 29 July 1959 at the church of Christ the King, Cabra. Conroy resigned from the union before their wedding, and instead volunteered at Our Lady's Hostel for Homeless Boys in Eccles Street, Dublin. Her husband died in February 1969.

== Later career ==
Conroy missed out on the second Labour Party nomination to stand in Dublin South-East in the 1969 general election, losing out to Noel Browne. She worked for a time as a playgroup leader at Our Lady's Hospital for Sick Children, Crumlin before she was recruited by Ruaidhrí Roberts in November 1969 to take up the post at The People's College as part-time secretary-organiser. Conroy focused her efforts on organising evening classes, increasing the student numbers and the range of classes offered. Due to increasing funding given to the College secured by her, Conroy was able to work full-time from 1975. She secured a government grant in 1979, and throughout the 1980s built up business sponsorship. In 1984, President Patrick Hillery became the college's patron. By the late 1980s, she had grown the student enrolment to 2000, starting at 200 when she took up the position. From 1984, she served as the college's president. She also sat on the executive and served as vice-president of Aontas, and promoted exchanges and links between Aontas and international adult education institutions.

Conroy was appointed to the Commission on the Status of Women, chaired by Thekla Beere, in 1970. The commission was tasked with assessing women's pay and employment conditions, and resulted in 49 recommendations being made to the government in its 1972 report. The report led to the abolition of differing pay scales based on gender and marital status, the implementation of equal pay, and the removal of the marriage bar. Conroy opposed Ireland's entry into the EEC, serving as chair of Irish Women Against the Common Market, fearing that it would mark increased food prices and result in more poverty. She was also the chair and public relations officer of the National Association of Widows in Ireland, a group she co-founded, and lobbied throughout the 1970s for the rights of widows to be made the same as widowers.

In May 1973, she was appointed to the RTÉ Authority on the recommendation of Michael O'Leary. She went on to become the chair from 1976 to 1979, the first woman to chair an Irish semi-state body. On 2 November 1978 she used her speech at the launch of the RTÉ 2 television channel to voice her belief in community-led programming, and that RTÉ should further support adult education initiatives, as well as promote the Irish language through a bilingual approach. In January 1979, she launched a working group to investigate the role of women in broadcasting. Throughout her tenure, she insisted on being called "chairman". She served on the authority again from 1979 to 1982.

Conroy sat on a variety of bodies, such as the Commission on Adult Education from 1981 to 1983, the Health Education Bureau from 1975 to 1978, and the Rent Tribunal from 1984 to 1988. She collaborated with Dermot Kinlen at St Patrick's Institution visiting committee to highlight and combat the issue of widespread illiteracy and lack of training among the juvenile inmates. Appalled by the institutional brutality, she refused to serve a second term.

She was awarded an honorary fellowship of the College of Industrial Relations in 1988, and an honorary doctorate by the National University of Ireland in 2001. Conroy lived in Sandymount Avenue, Ballsbridge, Dublin, moving to the Tara Care Centre, Bray, County Wicklow during her last years. She died there on 11 May 2012, and is buried with her husband at Deans Grange Cemetery.
