= Eveleen O'Brien =

Irish psychiatrist (1901–1981)

- Born: 1901; Tubbercurry, County Sligo
- Died: 31 July 1981 (aged 79–80); Dublin, Ireland
- Education: University College Dublin
- Scientific career
- Fields: Psychiatry

Eveleen O'Brien MD (1901 – 31 July 1981) was an Irish psychiatrist who worked in Irish asylum medicine, and cared for patients suffering from epilepsy. She also explored the crossover between neurology and psychiatry.

== Early life ==
Eveleen O'Brien, sometimes recorded as Evelyn O'Brien, was born in 1901 in Tubbercurry, County Sligo as the fourth child of six in a Catholic family. Her mother was Mary Josephine Ahearne, and her father was Thomas O’Brien.

== Education ==
She studied Latin and mathematics at the Ursuline Convent in Thurles and went to enrol in medicine in University College Dublin. She graduated in 1924 at the age of 23. To enhance her education, she finished neurology training in the Neurological Hospital, Queens Square, London, and then studied psychiatry in the Maudsley Hospital, London, where she earned a Diploma in Psychological Medicine from the Royal College of Physicians in 1929. Later, in 1942, she earned her doctorate in medicine (MD or Medicinae Doctor) from the National University of Ireland with her thesis titled “Epilepsy and its theories, results of treatment”.

== Career ==
The Irish asylum system was expanding in the early 1930s when O’Brien began her career there. In 1930, she began her first professional assignment in the asylum system working as an assistant medical officer in Portrane Mental Hospital. It served as her introduction to epilepsy and started a lifelong passion.

The Grangegorman Mental Hospital was founded in 1810 after the passage of the Criminal Lunatics Act in 1800. It was one of the first institutions to provide systematic care for the mentally ill and intellectually disabled poor in Ireland. O'Brien worked there between 1933 and 1966, and then went on to become governor of the Central Mental Hospital, Dundrum, Dublin, in January 1968 where she stayed until 1971.

O'Brien published consistently throughout her career, including several papers in the Journal of Mental Science and, in 1939, she authored the first systematic review of insulin therapy in Ireland.

== Personal life ==
O'Brien died at 80 years of age on 31 July 1981 in her home in Sutton, Dublin. She lived with and is believed to have been in a relationship with Helena Molony, until Molony's death in 1967.
