= Maura Breslin =

Irish feminist and trade unionist

- Born: Mary Breslin; 29 December 1914; Dublin, Ireland
- Died: 10 February 1984 (aged 69)

Maura Breslin (29 December 1914 – 10 February 1984) was an Irish nurse, feminist and trade unionist.

== Life ==
Maura Breslin was born Mary Breslin on 29 December 1914 in a Dublin workhouse, the illegitimate daughter of Maggie Breslin. She first worked as a staff nurse in St. Brendan's Hospital, Dublin, where she began her lifelong activism in trade unions by joining Irish Women Workers' Union (IWWU). She sat as an IWWU delegate to the Dublin Council of Trade Unions. She was elected president of the union in 1958. In January 1969, she was appointed the union's assistant general secretary, later becoming the general secretary in 1971, succeeding Kay McDowell.

Throughout her life, Breslin campaigned for equal rights for women in the workplace and in the trade union movement in Ireland. She sat as a member of the Irish Congress of Trade Unions' (ICTU) women's advisory committee. In 1973, she was elected to the executive of ICTU, the first woman to be elected since the ICTU's foundation in 1959. Breslin was an active member of the "equal pay for equal work" campaign during the 1960s and 1970s, an issue that was not resolved until a European court ruling. In March 1972, she addressed the commission on the status of women on the topics of equality in the training, recruitment and promotion of women. She particularly focused on the lack of opportunities for young women to take up trade apprenticeships. Throughout the 1970s, Breslin continued to campaign on behalf of those on low wages, targeting large corporate employers such as the Bank of Ireland computer centre.

Breslin was forced to retire in 1980 after 3 years of ill health. She unsuccessfully ran for a senate seat on the labour panel in 1981. She died on 10 February 1984.

Trade union offices
Preceded by Kay McDowell	Secretary of the Irish Women Workers' Union; 1970–1982	Succeeded by Padraigín Ní Mhurchú
