= The People's College =

Adult education organisation

- Formation: 1948; 78 years ago
- Type: Adult education
- Legal status: Non-profit
- Location(s): 31 Parnell Square, Dublin 1, Ireland
- Region served: Ireland
- President: Fionnuala Richardson
- Affiliations: Irish Congress of Trade Unions
- Website: www.peoplescollege.ie

The People's College is a voluntary organisation in Ireland that provides opportunities for adults to continue their education and training.

The college was founded in 1948 by members of the trade union movement in Ireland so that workers could further their education under the leadership of Ruaidhri Roberts. Today it provides general adult education such as languages, social and political studies, literature, art appreciation and cultural activities as well as personal development, basic education, and communication skills. While it still mainly serves trade union members and their families, courses are also available to the general public.

Based in Dublin, the college holds courses around the country. These are normally hosted by local trade union organisations.

== Affiliations ==
The college is a member of International Federation of Worker's Education Associations (IFWEA) since 1972. The People's College is a registered charity and a member of AONTAS, the National Adult Education Organisation. The office of the college is attached to Congress House, the headquarters of Irish Congress of Trade Unions (ICTU), which supports the college, along with other unions.

== People associated with the college ==
A founder Ruaidhri Roberts served as president from its foundation in 1948 until 1986.

Trade unionist Kay McDowell was one of the founders of the college, and sat on the inaugural central council.

Sheila Conroy who joined as secretary and organiser of the college in 1969 was officially appointed president of the college in 1988. In 2019 Fionnuala Richardson was elected as president of the college, succeeding Jim Dorney, who was appointed in 2013. Former General Secretary of ICTU, Peter Cassells served as vice-president of the college, and acting president following the death of Conroy in 2012 until 2013.

== Other activities ==
The college has an active debating society, founded in 1993 and a choir of about 50 members, who meet in the Teachers Club buildings in Parnell Square, and have also performed in Denmark, Italy and France. People in the college also arrange hill walking outings.
