= Lincoln biscuit =

Irish shortcake biscuit brand

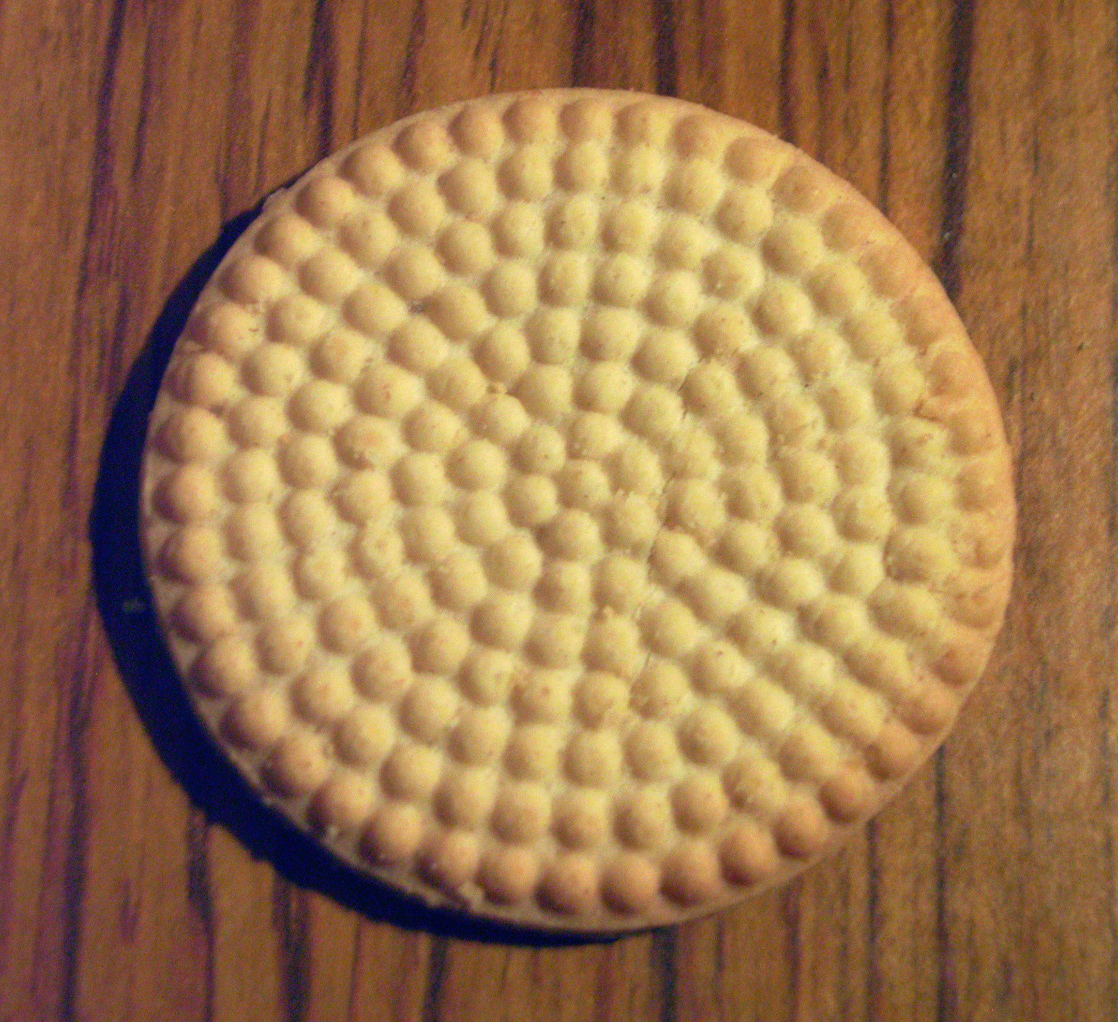
- A Lincoln biscuit
- Type: Biscuit
- Region or state: Europe
- Created by: William and Robert Jacob
- Main ingredients: Wheat flour, palm oil, sugar, salt, and soy lecithin
- Food energy (per serving): 36 kcal (150 kJ)
Nutritional value
(per serving)
- Protein: 0.5 g
- Fat: 1.4 g
- Carbohydrate: 5.2 g

A Lincoln biscuit is a circular shortcake biscuit, most commonly decorated on one side with a pattern of raised dots. It is commonly purchased in Ireland. Lincoln biscuits can be found in Irish supermarkets and are manufactured by Jacob's. The basic recipe has come under academic scrutiny and commercial analysis.

The McVitie's version had the word 'Lincoln' embossed on the centre of the biscuit.

In Argentina, Kraft Foods produces Galletitas Lincoln, rectangular Lincoln biscuits that have the dot pattern, under the Terrabusi brand name.

== Bibliography ==
- Baker, J. S.; Boobier, W. J.; Davies, B. Development of a healthy biscuit: an alternative approach to biscuit manufacture Nutrition Journal March 2006, 5:7 doi:10.1186/1475-2891-5-7
- Fearn T.; Miller A. R.; Thacker D.: Rotary moulded short dough biscuits Part 3: The effects of flour characteristics and recipe water level on the properties of Lincoln biscuits. Flour Milling and Baking Research Association Report (FMBRA) 1983, 102:8–12.
- Lawson R.; Miller A. R.; Thacker D.: Rotary moulded short dough biscuits Part 2: The effects of the level of ingredients on the properties of Lincoln biscuits. Flour Milling and Baking Research Association Report (FMBRA) 1981, 93:15–20.
- Miller A. R.; Thacker D.; Turrell S. G.: Performance of single wheat flours in a small-scale baking test for semi-sweet biscuits. Flour Milling and Baking Research Association Report (FMBRA) 1986, 123:17–24.
- Lawson R.; Miller A. R.; Thacker D.: Rotary moulded short-dough biscuits Part 4: The effects of rotary moulder control settings on the properties of Lincoln biscuits. Flour Milling and Baking Research Association Report (FMBRA) 1983, 106:9–17.
