= Hovis biscuit =

British manufactured digestive biscuit

- Type: Digestive biscuit

The Hovis biscuit is a British manufactured digestive biscuit.

Manufactured under license from 1980 from Hovis by Nabisco's then Irish subsidiary Jacob's, they are shaped like a miniature flat copy of the traditional Hovis loaf, and like the bread have the word "HOVIS" stamped on their top surface.

Now produced by United Biscuits, Hovis biscuits are sweet enough to be eaten on their own, with their slow release carbohydrates, dunked, and are plain enough to be taken as a savoury snack with a cheese topping.
