= Leslie Daiken =

Irish advertising copywriter, editor, activist, and writer (1912–1964)

Leslie Herbert Daiken (29 June 1912 – 15 August 1964) was an Irish advertising copywriter, editor, and writer on children's toys and games, in his youth in the 1930s a poet active in leftist politics and editor of the duplicated circular Irish Front. Born Leslie Yodaiken, Daiken was sometimes known to friends as Yod. He also published work under the name Ned Kiernan. In the last year of his life, Daiken became a lecturer at the University of Ghana and died in post.

== Early life ==
Born in Dublin's Little Jerusalem into a Russian-Jewish family, Daiken was the son of Samuel and Rosa Yodaiken. His father was a dealer in rubber and scrap metal, with premises in Dublin and Glasgow, and he was educated at two independent fee-paying schools, St Andrew's College and Wesley College, and then in 1930 he entered Trinity College Dublin. In his first year, one of his lecturers in French literature was Samuel Beckett. Daiken was an active member of the Dublin University Socialist Society and a founding member of the college's Gaelic Society.

In 1932, and again in 1933, as Yodaiken he won the Vice-Chancellor's Prize for English Prose, and while at Trinity, he published short stories and verse (seen as wild and strange) in Choice, The Dublin Magazine, and The New English Weekly.

In 1933, Daiken was present at the house of Charlotte Despard in Eccles Street, Dublin, also used as a Workers' College, when it was attacked by a mob of Blueshirts. Daiken led the immediate defence of the building, which was saved on that occasion by the intervention of IRA men posing as the police.

In 1934, as Yodaiken, he graduated with a BA from Trinity in English and French Literature, with a Second Class degree. After graduating, Daiken worked briefly as a schoolteacher in Dublin. In April 1935, his short story “Angela” was published in The New English Weekly under the pen name of Ned Kiernan. That year, Daiken migrated to London.

== Life in England ==
Soon after his arrival in London, Daiken was one of the three founders of a duplicated publication called Irish Front, together with two other poets, Charlie Donnelly and Ewart Milne.

In England, Daiken started to shorten his surname from Yodaiken to Daiken, for his publications, but he did not make this change formally until doing so by deed poll in 1943.

In December 1935, The Irish Times reviewed a production in Camden Town of Ireland Unfree, a stage version by Daiken of Patrick Pearse’s poem "The Rebel". It stated that "Mr Daiken carries Pearse’s theme beyond his idealistic conclusion to the revolutionary viewpoint of the Irish workers."

Daiken kept up his links with leftist Irish writers and dissidents and edited the collection of working-class political verse Goodbye Twilight: songs of the struggle in Ireland (1936), illustrated by Harry Kernoff. The Irish Press described this as "forty young poets with blazing eyes and clenched fists". In another review, Louis MacNeice called the book a "collection of proletarian poems – some communist, some Irish republican, and all written in a defiant spirit of opposition ... a violent reaction against Yeats and all that he stood for."

Daiken did not go to fight in the Spanish Civil War, although his Irish Front colleague Charlie Donnelly did, and was killed; but he was active in fundraising for the Connolly Column, the Irish section of the International Brigades. He was also a contributor to the branch of Republican Congress in London, an Irish republican and Marxist-Leninist pressure group which aimed to engage Irish emigrants working in the city on socialist issues.

In 1939, Mairin Mitchell was highly critical of the Irish leftists, and in particular Daiken, for their views on the Molotov–Ribbentrop Pact, and wrote to Desmond Ryan in September "Brian O'Neill, Bloomsbury, and Daiken will sing Russia right or wrong."

In October 1939, at the time of the wartime National Registration Act, Daiken was living in a studio at Old Castle Wharf, Twickenham, and described himself as "Script-writer and advertising copywriter".

During the Second World War, Daiken enlisted in the Corps of Signals of the Irish Army, a neutral force, and also worked for Reuters as a correspondent on education. In 1944, Daiken edited They Go, the Irish, a collection of essays, including one from Sean O'Casey. In 1945, a collection of Daiken's verse was published under the title Signatures of All Things. In the summer of that year, Samuel Beckett gave Daiken his unpublished novel Watt, in the hope that Daiken could find a publisher for it, but he failed to do so. They continued to write to each other and met in London and Paris in the 1950s. Daiken also kept up with another friend from Trinity, Con Leventhal.

After he became a father in 1945, Daiken's main interest moved on from political activism to children's games and toys, and by 1951 the basement of his London home had become a toy museum. He wrote on the subject and made television and radio programmes for the BBC about it. His film One potato, two potato, a compilation of children's street rhymes, won the Festival Mondial du Film prize in 1958. His radio play The Circular Road was about a Jewish-Irish child.

In the 1950s Daiken founded the National Toy Museum and Institute of Play, today part of the Toy Collection at Hove Museum and Art Gallery.

Daiken returned to Ireland many times as a visitor. In the early 1960s he completed a radio play about the Jewish community of Dublin in the 1920s, which was broadcast on RTÉ.

In October 1963, Conor Cruise O'Brien, Vice Chancellor of the University of Ghana, recruited Daiken as a lecturer in education, and not long before his death Daiken made a film called "The Piano" about teaching white and black children in a school in Africa. He died in August 1964, while spending the summer vacation at home in London.

In a tribute to Daiken, his 1930s communist associate Brian O'Neill wrote "He was always busy, always with a half dozen irons in the fire, always trying to give a hand to some Irish writer who needed it."

In the early 1990s, Katrina Goldstone interviewed Daiken's brother, Aubrey Yodaiken, and later reported:

I was left with a faint sense of melancholy, as my interviewee had become distressed speaking about his brother, Leslie Daiken, and recalling his irrepressible and exasperating personality, his many projects, half-started novels...

Aubrey Yodaiken was distressed by the lack of appreciation of his brother's many cultural efforts and by the fact that his “scattershot literary endeavours” seemed to have come to naught.

== Private life ==
In 1944 at Kensington Daiken married Lilyan Marion Jean Adams (born 1908), a Canadian actor. They lived at 19 Prince Albert Road, Primrose Hill, London, and had two daughters, Melanie (1945), who became a musician, and Elinor (1947). Daiken died at age 52 in London on 15 August 1964, leaving an estate valued at £3,865, and was cremated. His widow survived him until 1981.

== Collected papers ==
The National Library of Ireland holds a collection of Daiken's papers, in particular his publications and correspondence, presented to it in 1995 by his elder daughter, by then Melanie Cuming, and his younger brother, Aubrey Yodaiken. The papers are mostly in English, French, German, Dutch, Italian, Hebrew, and Irish.

== Selected works ==
- Goodbye Twilight: songs of the struggle in Ireland (London: Lawrence and Wishart, 1936), ed.
- Shamrocks for Mayakovsky: Anniversary Lines 1933–1943 (1943)
- They Go, the Irish: a miscellany of war-time writing (London: Nicholson & Watson, 1944), ed.
- Signatures of All Things (Hoddesdon: The Clock House Press, 1945, verse)
- Children's Games Throughout the Year (London: B. T. Batsford, 1949), with cover illustration by Kate Greenaway
- Teaching Through Play: A Teacher's Handbook on Games (1954)
- London Pleasures for Young People (London: Thames Hudson, 1957)
- The Lullaby Book (London: E. Ward, 1959), collection of lullabies, with my sical research by Mary Hillis and Sebastian Brown
- Pageantry and Customs: A Swift Picture Book (London: Longacre Press, 1960)
- Out She Goes: Dublin street rhymes, with a commentary (1963)
- Children's Toys Throughout the Ages (London: Spring Books, 1963)
- World of Toys (1963)
