= Louie Bennett =

Irish suffragette (1870–1956)

- Born: Louisa Elizabeth Bennett; 7 January 1870
- Died: 25 November 1956 (aged 86); Dublin, Ireland
- Education: Alexandra College
- Organization(s): Irish Women's Workers Union, Irish Trades Union Congress, Irish Women's Suffrage Federation
- Political party: Labour Party

Louie Bennett (7 January 1870 – 25 November 1956) was an Irish suffragette, trade unionist, journalist and writer. Born and raised in Dublin, she established the Irish Women's Suffrage Federation in 1911. She was a joint editor and contributor to the Irish Citizen newspaper. She wrote two books, The Proving of Priscilla (1902) and A Prisoner of His Word (1908), and continued to contribute to newspapers as a freelance journalist. She played a significant role in the Irish Women Workers' Union, and was the first woman president of the Irish Trade Union Congress.

== Early life ==
Louisa "Louie" Elizabeth Bennett was born on 7 January 1870 in Temple Road, in the new upper-class suburb of Rathmines in Dublin, into a Church of Ireland family. The eldest of nine surviving children of ten, she had four sisters and five brothers. Her father, James Bennett, ran the family business as a fine art auctioneer and valuer on Ormond Quay. Her mother, Susan Boulger, came from a family of some social standing in Dublin. The family later moved to the suburb of Killiney, overlooking Dublin Bay. Her mother's family disapproved of her parents' marriage; Susan Boulger came from a British Army family who did not approve of their daughter marrying "into trade".

She was initially educated at home with her brothers and sisters, but later went to a boarding school in England, and for a time, to Alexandra College in Dublin. She briefly studied music in Bonn, Germany. As a young girl she immersed herself in novels by Dickens, Meredith, Austen and Thackeray, and was introduced to women's rights by reading George Eliot. She published two novels, The Proving of Priscilla (published by Harpers, 1902) and A Prisoner of His Word (Maunsel, 1908).

== Suffrage movement and the Irish Citizen ==
=== Suffrage movement ===
The terms suffragette (militant) and suffragist (non-militant) are used to describe those who campaigned for the rights of women to vote. From the late 1800s, suffrage societies were emerging in Ireland in response to changing social and political times. Louie Bennett and Helen Chenevix absorbed the Irishwomen's Suffrage and Local Government Association (IWSLGA) and scattered local suffrage societies into the Irish Women's Suffrage Federation (IWSF), an umbrella group for most of the non-militant suffrage societies, in 1911: the year suffragettes refused to participate in the census in protest at their lack of a vote. After Carrie Chapman Catt and Jane Addams formed a Women's Peace Party in the United States in January 1915, suffragists divided on the correct stance for women towards war. British suffragettes and unionist-leaning campaigners in Ireland abandoned or postponed all suffrage work. In the Irish Citizen, Bennett stated unequivocally that "Women should never have abandoned their struggle for justice, war or no war".

Some members of the Irish suffrage movement were also involved in the independence movement, though others were unionists. As the fighter for both suffrage and freedom Sidney Czira (John Brennan) put it in an interview with RTÉ Television, the suffragists wanted to get into the British parliament, and the independence movement wanted to get out of it.

=== Involvement with the Irish Citizen ===
In 1920, Bennett took over financial and editorial control of the Irish Women's Franchise League's paper, the Irish Citizen. It had been founded in 1912 to further the causes of suffrage and feminism in Ireland and was first edited by James Cousins and Francis Sheehy Skeffington. In March 1913, Cousins left Ireland, leaving Sheehy Skeffington as the sole editor. Sheehy Skeffington was murdered in 1916 by British soldiers during the Easter rising. Control of the paper was then taken by Francis's widow Hanna Sheehy Skeffington, with Bennett's help. Bennett had been outspoken against the policy of the Irish Citizen in the past and had actually withdrawn her subscription to the paper the previous year. In 1916 Hanna Sheehy Skeffington relinquished her role to travel to America and campaign for justice after the death of her husband. That left Bennett as the joint editor of the paper with fellow IWFL member Mary Bourke-Dowling. During the time that Bennett took over, the paper had a number of debts, and had shrunk from its original eight pages to four, with one of these pages consisting entirely of advertisements. To combat this, Bennett wanted more space to be given towards trade unions (to increase sales) and in 1920 the IWWU and the Irish Nurses' Organisation started using the paper as their official journal – despite Sheehy Skeffington writing in it that it needed to stay distinctly unaffiliated to any party. In 1920 Bennett told Sheehy Skeffington that she would like to take over control of the paper and turn it into a feminist Labour paper. This proved the last straw for Sheehy Skeffington, who ended their agreement. Sheehy Skeffington's own interests started to shift away from the paper as a member of the Sinn Féin in 1920.

Bennett was left in control of the paper until its demise a few months later. Funding decreased due to its dwindling support and the ethos of the paper changing to a trade union organ. The printing press was destroyed by the Black and Tans during the War of Independence. The final issue was published in September 1920.

== Trade union work ==
=== Irish Women Workers' Union ===
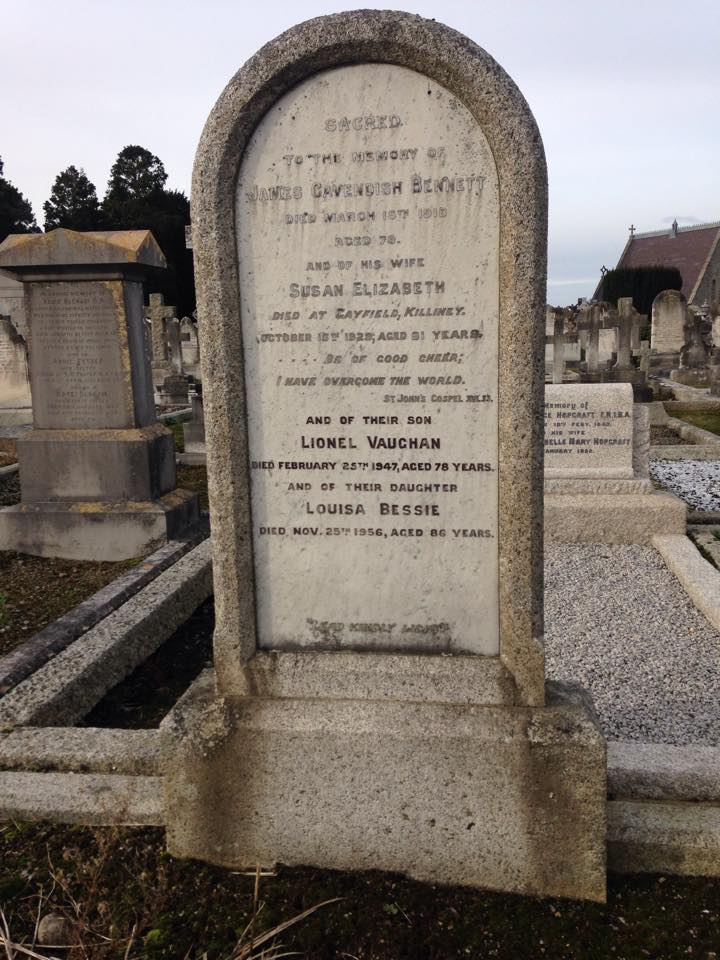
Louie Bennett's headstone, located at Deans Grange Cemetery, Dublin

The Irish Women Workers' Union was founded at a public meeting held on 5 September 1911 in the old Concert Hall on Great Brunswick Street (later the academy cinema on what is now called Pearse Street). The union would not only give women a greater voice in the workplace but would also help to win them the vote and improve their status in society, according to Constance Markievicz. Following her attendance at the Trade Union Congress in Sligo 1916, Bennett became publicly identified with the Irish Women's Worker's Union. Helena Molony had approached Bennett to become involved and they, along with Helen Chenevix and Rosie Hackett, became key figures in a re-organised IWWU after 1916.

The Union's role as a voice for women was centred on attempts to win improved pay and conditions for women workers, parity with male workers and the right to apply for the same jobs and be accorded the same status as men. On 20 November 1935, the IWWU, under Bennett, staged street protests against discriminatory sections of Seán Lemass's Conditions of Employment bill. In 1945, the Union organised a successful three-month strike for improved conditions and won the entitlement, subsequently enjoyed by all Irish workers, to two weeks' paid annual holidays. On the political front, the Union was also an effective lobbying organisation that sought to make progress on a range of issues of direct relevance to Irish women by working to influence the wider trade union movement as well as successive governments. Bennett continued to be involved in a leadership role until 1955.

=== The Irish Trades Union Congress ===
She was a member of the national executive of the Irish Trades Union Congress from 1927 to 1932, and from 1944 to 1950. In 1932, Bennett became its first woman president and was elected to the position again in 1948.

== Political activity ==
In 1927, she was elected to the executive committee of the Labour Party. In 1943, she was elected as a Labour Party member of the Dún Laoghaire borough council.

She was a pacifist and in later life she campaigned against nuclear power.

== Personal life, death and legacy ==
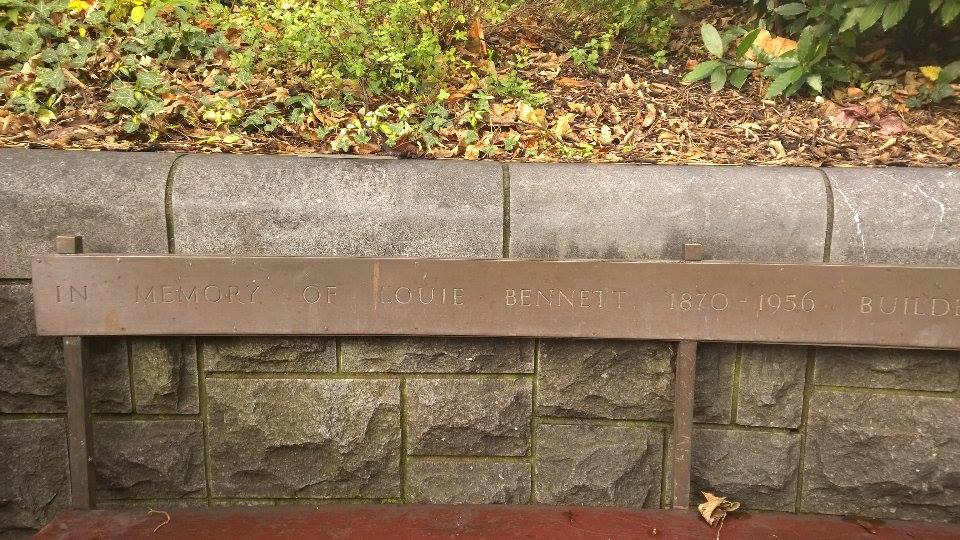
Memorial to Louie Bennett in Dublin's Stephen's Green.

Bennett lived with her long-time romantic partner Helen Chenevix in Killiney, County Dublin.

Bennett died on 25 November 1956, aged 86. Her funeral was attended by many trade union and Labour figures including William Norton. She is buried at Deans Grange Cemetery, sharing a grave with her mother, father and brother Lionel Vaughan Bennett. In the year following her death, R.M. Fox published a book titled Louie Bennett, Her Life and Times, based on her reminiscences to him in the final year of her life.

In 1958 a park bench memorial in St Stephen's Green was commissioned to pay tribute to her life and service.

In 1996, she was commemorated with a stamp by An Post. The 32 pence stamp described her as a suffragette and trade unionist.

== See also ==
- List of suffragists and suffragettes

Trade union offices
Preceded by Helena Molony	Secretary of the Irish Women Workers' Union; 1917–1955	Succeeded by Helen Chenevix
Preceded by Denis Cullen	President of the Irish Trades Union Congress; 1932	Succeeded by Seán Campbell
Preceded by John Swift	President of the Irish Trades Union Congress; 1948	Succeeded by James Larkin Jnr
