= Maureen Wall =

Irish historian

- Born: 1918; Dublin, Ireland
- Died: June 1972 (aged 53–54)
- Occupations: Writer, historian
- Writing career
- Genre: History
- Subject: 18th-century Irish history

Maureen Wall (née McGeehin; 1918 – June 1972) was an Irish historian known for her work on 18th-century Ireland. She is regarded as a pioneer in the modern study of the Penal Laws in Ireland.

== Life and work ==
Born Maureen McGeehin in County Donegal, Wall became a leading authority on 18th-century Irish history.

Wall was educated at an Irish-speaking boarding school in Falcarragh. She trained as a primary school teacher at Carysfort College before pursuing a university degree through evening studies. She was also a member of her local branch of the Gaelic League. In 1944, Wall contracted tuberculosis, which led to extended stays in hospitals in Dún Laoghaire and Switzerland. Her illness ultimately forced her to leave teaching. She later took a position with the Irish Folklore Commission, where she met her future husband, the commission's librarian, Tom Wall.

She married in 1954 and, through her thesis supervisor, secured a position in the Department of Irish History at University College Dublin (UCD). Wall eventually became one of the university's most respected lecturers. Her academic titles varied over the years, as historian Dudley Edwards was determined to retain her in the department and secured whatever posts were available to ensure her employment.

In 1961, she launched the Dublin Historical Association pamphlet series with her influential work on the Penal Laws. For this, she was awarded the National University of Ireland historical prize. Her interpretations of key events in Irish history remained standard for many years.

Wall is commemorated by a medal awarded to the top-performing student in the second-year history examination at UCD. The prize was endowed by her friends in her memory.

== Bibliography ==
- Wall, Maureen. "Partition: The Ulster Question (1916–1926)." In The Irish Struggle, 1916–1926, edited by Desmond Williams. London: Routledge & Kegan Paul, 1966.
- Wall, Maureen (1967). The Penal Laws, 1691–1760. Dublin Historical Association.
- Wall, Maureen; O'Brien, Gerard; Dunne, Tom (1952). Catholic Ireland in the Eighteenth Century: Collected Essays of Maureen Wall. Geography Publications. ISBN 978-0-906602-10-2.
- Wall, Maureen, and J. G. Simms. A Glimpse of Town and Country in Eighteenth-Century Ireland. 1971.
- Wall, Maureen. "The Rise of a Catholic Middle Class in Eighteenth-Century Ireland." Irish Historical Studies, vol. 11, no. 42, 1958, pp. 91–115. Cambridge University Press.
