= Melanie Ruth Daiken =

English composer and music educator

Melanie Ruth Daiken (27 July 1945 – 25 June 2016) was an English conductor, composer and music educator. She taught at the Royal Academy of Music and became Deputy Head of Composition in 1986. Her compositions have been performed on radio and she was commissioned to write an opera by the Edinburgh Festival.

== Life ==
She was born in London, the daughter of a Canadian mother and Leslie Daiken, a Russian-Jewish writer from Ireland. She began violin lessons at an early age, and studied piano with Vivian Langrish and composition with Hugh Wood at the Royal Academy of Music. She also studied at the University of London, the University of Ghana, and was awarded a scholarship to study at the Paris Conservatoire with Yvonne Loriod and Olivier Messiaen in 1964. During this time she became friends with Samuel Beckett, who was her friend of Daiken's father. After completing her studies, she took a teaching position with the Royal Academy of Music and became Deputy Head of Composition in 1986. Daiken also taught at Morley College and London University.

Daiken's compositions are often settings of writing, including work by Paul Eluard, F. Garcia Lorca, Rupert Brooke and Samuel Beckett. Her 1975 composition Gems of Erin was based on Beckett’s poems from Echo’s Bones and Other Precipitates. The Edinburgh Festival commissioned Daikon to write an opera, Mayakovsky and the Sun. Alexander Goehr led the performance by the Music Theatre Ensemble. Some of her chamber works were performed on Radio 3. Her 1983 Requiem for piano was called "striking".

Her pupils included Jeffrey Ching, Leandro Espinosa, Andrew Robert McBirnie and Roxanna Panufnik.

== Works ==
- Eusebius, opera
- Playboy of the Western World, opera
- Mayakovsky and the Sun, opera
