= Irish Women Workers' Union =

The Irish Women Workers' Union was a trade union which was set up at a meeting on 5 September 1911 in Dublin, Ireland. The meeting had been organized by Delia Larkin. The union was created because other trade unions of the time excluded women workers.

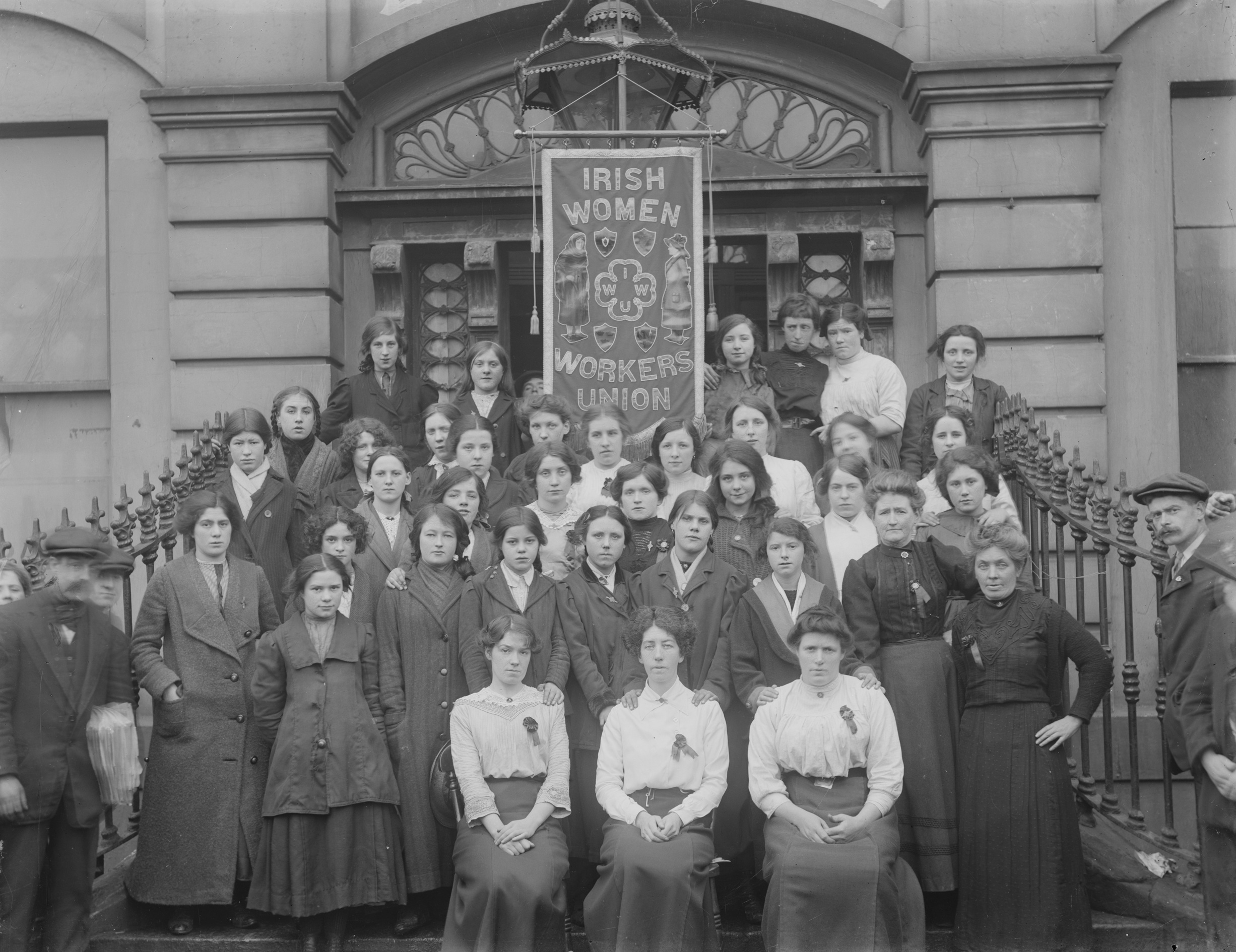
Members on the steps of Liberty Hall, ca. 1914

James Larkin, brother of Delia, was the union's first president, while Delia was its first secretary. A founder member and activist was Rosie Hackett. In 1911 Rosie was working as a messenger for the Jacob's biscuit factory. The male workers withdrew their labour in pursuit of better working conditions and Rosie was one of the first women to come out in sympathy with them and helped organise the women workers to withdraw their labour in protest. The women were successful and they received better working conditions and an increase in pay.

In Dublin a move by management at Jacob's to force three young women to remove their union badges played an important part in starting the 1913 lockout. By the end of the day more than 1,100 women had lost their jobs and the dispute took on a wider significance when their cause was taken up by dockworkers who refused to handle Jacob's goods. The union supported the striking workers and carried out industrial actions of its own, while once again Rosie Hackett helped to organise the women in Jacobs to strike and protest against poor working conditions. Helena Molony, an Abbey actor and nationalist, became involved with Sheila Dowling, and with Constance Markievicz helped to organise soup kitchens at Liberty Hall during the dispute. Their friend and co worker was the republican activist Jennie Shanahan.

In 1937 the union, led by Louie Bennett, objected to passages in the new Irish Constitution, and were joined by the Irish Women Graduates' Association and others. They noted that: "the omission of the principle of equal rights and opportunities enunciated in the Proclamation of 1916 and confirmed in Article 3 of the Constitution of the Saorstat Éireann was deplored as sinister and retrogressive."

The union's membership peaked at 6,000 in 1955, then continually fell until it merged into the Federated Workers' Union of Ireland in 1984.

== Secretaries ==
1911: Delia Larkin
1915: Helena Molony
1917: Louie Bennett
1955: Helen Chenevix
1957: Kay McDowell
1970: Maura Breslin
1982: Padraigín Ní Mhurchú
