= Helena Molony =

Irish republican, feminist and labour activist, editor (1883–1967)

- Molony, c. 1940s

Secretary of the Irish Women Workers' Union
- In office 1915–1917
- Preceded by: Delia Larkin
- Succeeded by: Louie Bennett

Personal details
- Born: 15 January 1883 Dublin, Ireland
- Died: 29 January 1967 (aged 84) Dublin, Ireland

Military service
- Branch/service: Irish Citizen Army
- Battles/wars: Easter Rising

Helena Mary Molony (15 January 1883 – 29 January 1967) was an Irish republican, feminist and labour activist. She fought in the 1916 Easter Rising and later became the second woman president of the Irish Trades Union Congress.

== Early life ==
Molony was born at 8 Coles Lane, off Henry Street, in the centre of Dublin, to Michael Molony, a grocer, and Catherine McGrath. Her mother died early in Helena's life. Her father later remarried, but both members of the couple became alcoholics, something which would influence Helena years later.

== Inghinidhe na hÉireann ==
In 1903, inspired by a pro-nationalist speech given by Maud Gonne, Molony joined Inghinidhe na hÉireann (Daughters of Ireland) and began a lifelong commitment to the nationalist cause. In 1908 she became the editor of the organisation's monthly newspaper, Bean na hÉireann (Woman of Ireland). "Bean na hÉireann brought together a nationalist group; Constance Markievicz designed the title page, and wrote the gardening column; Sydney Gifford (under the nom de plume "John Brennan") wrote for the paper and was on its production team; contributors included Eva Gore-Booth, Susan L. Mitchell, and Katharine Tynan, as well as Patrick Pearse, Thomas MacDonagh, AE, Roger Casement, Arthur Griffith and James Stephens. The paper included an eclectic selection of articles – fashion notes (involving Irish materials and Irish-made clothes), a labour column, cookery, politics, fiction, poetry...

Molony was central to the school meals activism of the movement; with Maud Gonne, Marie Perolz and others, she organised the supply of daily school meals to children in impoverished areas, and pressured Dublin Corporation and other bodies to provide proper meals (meat and vegetables, and on Fridays rice and milk) to hungry children in Dublin.

== Republicanism and Labour ==
Molony also had a career as an actress, and was a member of the Abbey Theatre. However her primary commitment was to her political work. She was a strong political influence, credited with bringing many into the movement, including Constance Markievicz and Dr Kathleen Lynn, who wrote: ‘We used to have long talks and she converted me to the national movement. She was a very clever and attractive girl with a tremendous power of making friends.’

As a labour activist, Molony was a close colleague of Markievicz and of James Connolly, whose secretary she was for a time. In November 1915 Connolly appointed her secretary of the Irish Women Workers' Union, in succession to Delia Larkin. This union had been formed during the strike at Jacob's Biscuit Factory 1911 and was part of the 1913 Dublin Lock-out. Molony managed the union's shirt factory in Liberty Hall, founded to give employment to the strikers put out of work and blacklisted after the strike. "Not one of them is a penny the better for her part in either fight [the 1916 Rising, where all served, and the strike at Jacob's]," wrote Molony in her statement to the Bureau of Military History. "In such a manner is the real aristocracy of a country born." She was friendly with the family of Thomas MacDonagh and his wife, Muriel, and was the godmother of their daughter Barbara, whose godfather was Patrick Pearse; describing Liberty Hall, where Connolly spent much of his time, she wrote: "Connolly, after hours, could be free for private visitors… Pearse called many times, also Joe Plunkett and Tom MacDonagh. These men were all intimate friends of mine, so it seemed quite natural for me to encourage them to buy socks and ties from us."

In the same account, Molony describes leafletting O'Connell Street – then, on the GPO side, only frequented by British soldiers and their girlfriends: "Misses Elizabeth O'Farrell and Sighle Grennan and myself were spotted by police. We took to our heels, and were chased through Henry Street, Mary Street and right up to the Markets in Capel Street. We got away clear, as we were young and swift, and the police were hampered by long heavy overcoats. On the whole we feared more the soldiers with their canes."

Molony met with Constance Markievicz and Bulmer Hobson at her brother's house in Sherrard Street to discuss the setting up of a nationalist boys organisation. Fianna Éireann, the cadet body of the Irish Volunteers, was founded at 34 Lower Camden Street, Dublin, on 16 August 1909. It was during this period of working together in building the Fianna that Molony and Hobson grew close and became romantically linked. However, the relationship was not to last. Molony confided to a friend in the 1930s that she believed they were to be wed, but that Hobson had 'broken her heart' and left her.

== 1916 Easter Rising ==
Molony was a member of Connolly's Irish Citizen Army, and was secretary of its women's group. During the 1916 Easter Rising, she was one of a Citizen Army group that attacked Dublin Castle. During the defence of City Hall, her commanding officer, Sean Connolly was killed, and Molony was captured and imprisoned for a week in the Ship Street Barracks, before being transferred to Richmond Barracks and then to Kilmainham Gaol. She was later moved to Mountjoy Prison and then to HM Prison Aylesbury from where she was released in December 1916.

== Later life ==
After the Irish Civil War, Molony became the second female president of the Irish Trades Union Congress. She remained active in the republican cause during the 1930s, particularly with the Women's Prisoner's Defence League and the People's Rights Association.

From the 1930s, Molony was in a relationship with doctor Eveleen O'Brien, with whom she lived until her 1967 death.

She retired from public life in 1946, but continued to work for women's labour rights; she died in Dublin on 29 January 1967 following a stroke. Molony is buried in the republican plot at Glasnevin Cemetery.

Trade union offices
Preceded by Delia Larkin	Secretary of the Irish Women Workers' Union; 1915–1917	Succeeded by Louie Bennett
Preceded by Michael Drumgoole	President of the Irish Trades Union Congress; 1937	Succeeded by Jeremiah Hurley
