= Irish Women's Suffrage Federation =

Organisation to unite suffrage societies in Ireland

The Irish Women's Suffrage Federation (IWSF) was an organisation founded in 1911 to unite scattered suffrage societies in Ireland.

== See also ==
- Women's suffrage organizations
- Timeline of women's suffrage
- List of suffragists and suffragettes
