= Delia Larkin =

Irish trade unionist, journalist and actress

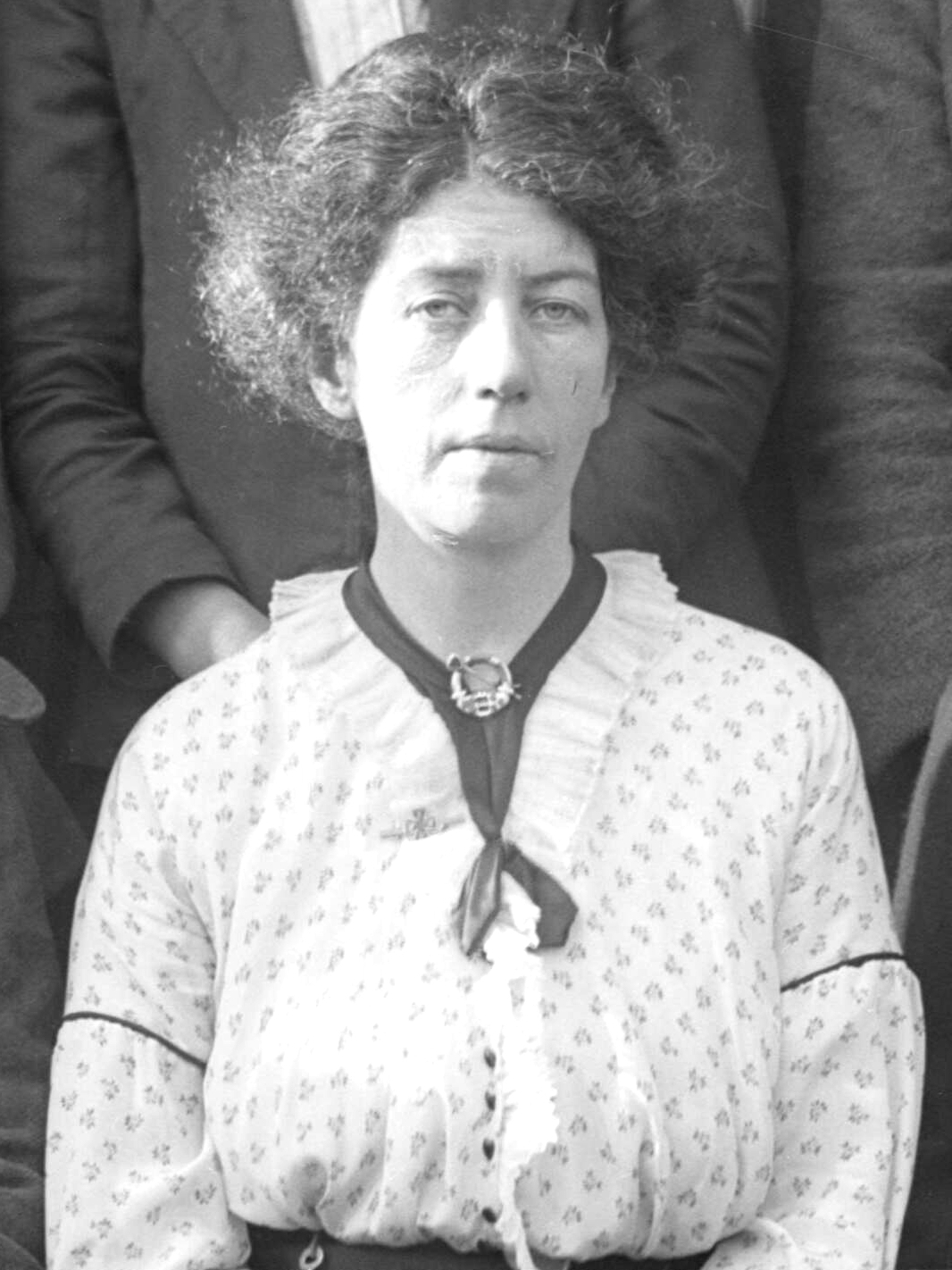
- Larkin in the 1910s

General Secretary of the Irish Women Workers' Union
- In office 1911–1915
- Succeeded by: Helena Molony

Personal details
- Born: February 27, 1878
- Died: October 26, 1949 (aged 71)
- Resting place: Glasnevin Cemetery, Dublin

Delia Larkin (27 February 1878 – 26 October 1949) was a trade union organiser, journalist and actress, born to Irish parents in Liverpool, England. She was influenced by the activities of her brother, James Larkin, to move to Ireland, and was prominent during the 1913 Dublin Lockout. She was active in Irish trade union activities and was a founding secretary of the Irish Women Workers' Union.

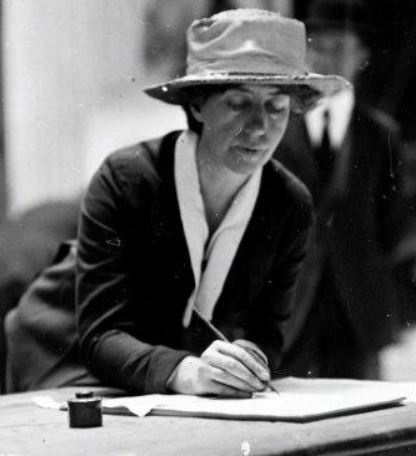
Larkin signing the Women's Anti-Conscription Pledge in City Hall, Dublin

== Background ==
Delia Larkin was born on February 28, 1878, in the Toxteth area of Liverpool, England, to James Larkin, a fitter, and Mary Ann McNulty, originally from County Down. Following the death of her father in 1887, when she was just nine, Delia, the youngest of six siblings, took on work to help support her family. Influenced deeply by her brother James Larkin's socialist politics and literary pursuits, Delia developed a strong sense of social justice. Her early life experiences and exposure to her brother's activism motivated her to later join the Irish trade union movement after moving to Rostrevor, County Down, in 1907.

== Career ==
=== General Secretary Role ===
In 1911, Delia became the first general secretary of the Irish Women Workers' Union (IWWU), which was founded with her brother James Larkin's support. Under her leadership, the union advocated for improved wages and working conditions for women, organizing campaigns that increased the visibility of women's rights in the workplace. Her passionate speeches and writings, including contributions to *The Irish Worker*, helped galvanize support for the IWWU.

Her brother James established a newspaper, The Irish Worker and People's Advocate, as a pro-labour alternative to the capitalist-owned press. This organ was characterised by a campaigning approach and the harsh denunciation of unfair employers and of Larkin's political enemies. She wrote a weekly column for the paper until its suppression by the authorities in 1914.

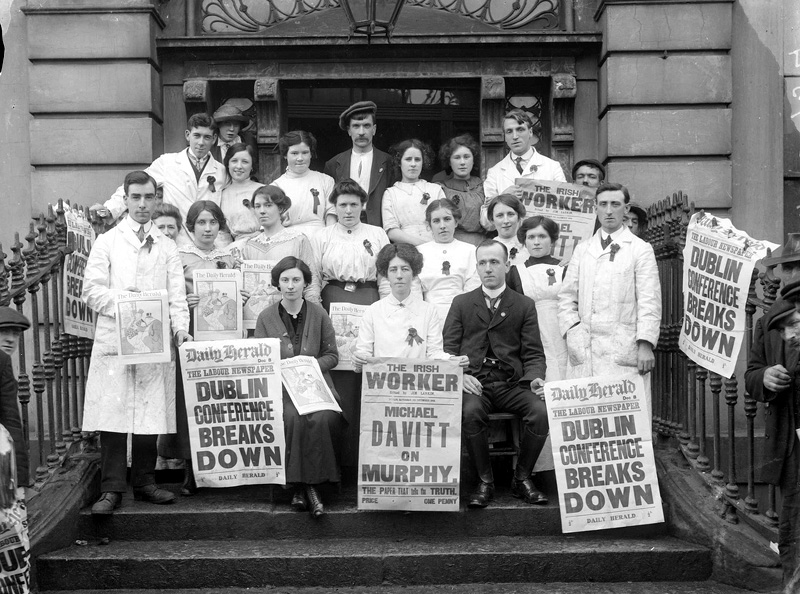
Delia Larkin (front, centre) with workers at Liberty Hall, 1913

=== Dublin Lockout ===
During the 1913 Dublin Lockout, Delia Larkin played a pivotal role in supporting workers. When her brother James traveled to England for support, she managed Liberty Hall, coordinating relief operations that provided food and resources to union members and their families. Despite facing significant challenges, including resistance from other unions, her efforts helped sustain the strikers during one of the most critical labour disputes in Irish history.

=== Cultural Contributions ===
Believing that trade unions should also foster cultural and social development, Delia Larkin founded the Irish Workers' Choir and the Irish Workers Dramatic Company in 1912. Through these initiatives, she organized Irish-language classes, drama productions, and music programs at Liberty Hall, enriching the cultural lives of workers and their families.

However, in 1914, Delia Larkin was threatened with legal action by Lady Gregory for using her play, *The Workhouse Ward*, without permission. Delia had hoped to raise money with the play to help victims of the Lockout.

She left Ireland to work as a nurse in England before the 1916 Rising and returned in 1918. After conflicts with the ITGWU, she helped James and another brother, Peter, found the Workers' Union of Ireland.

She was a committed suffragist and spoke out repeatedly to demand the inclusion of female suffrage in the proposed Home Rule Bill.

== Personal life and death ==
In 1921, she married Patrick Colgan, a member of the Irish Citizen Army. When they moved to Ballsbridge, James Larkin joined them and lived out his last years in their flat.

She died at home and is buried in Glasnevin Cemetery.

== Bibliography ==
- James Larkin, Emmet O'Connor, Cork University Press, Cork, 2002.
- Lockout: Dublin 1913, Pádraig Yeates, Gill and Macmillan, Dublin, 2000.
- The Rise of the Irish Trade Unions, Andrew Boyd, Anvil Books, Dublin, 1985.
- Brockie, Gerard; Walsh, Raymond (2004), Modern Ireland, Gill & Macmillan, ISBN 0-7171-3516-0
- "Dublin Lockout 1913". Patrick Yeates History Ireland Magazine, Vol. 9 No. 2 Summer 2001.

Trade union offices
New office	Secretary of the Irish Women Workers' Union; 1911–1915	Succeeded by Helena Molony
