= Dublin lock-out =

Major industrial dispute which took place in Dublin, Ireland

The Dublin lock-out
- Part of the Great Unrest
- Dublin Metropolitan Police break up a union rally
- Date: 26 August 1913 – 18 January 1914
- Location: Dublin, United Kingdom of Great Britain and Ireland
- Caused by: Poor working conditions; Lack of workers' rights; Inability to unionise
- Goals: Improved working conditions; Granting of right to unionise
- Methods: Strikes, rallies, walkouts
- Result: Strikers go back to work; Many workers sign pledges not to join ITGWU; ITGWU badly damaged; Principle of unionisation accepted; Formation of the Irish Citizen Army

Parties
Workers organizations: ITGWU; UBLU; Irish Citizen Army; Supported by: TUC	Employers & companies: DUTC; DBTEA; Supported by: Dublin Corporation; Dublin Metropolitan Police; Roman Catholic Church

Lead figures
James Larkin; James Connolly; Jack White	William Martin Murphy

Number
20,000 workers	300 employers

Casualties and losses
	200 policemen injured
- 2 dead, several hundred injured

The Dublin lock-out was a major industrial dispute between approximately 20,000 workers and 300 employers that took place in Dublin, Ireland. The dispute, lasting from 26 August 1913 to 18 January 1914, is often viewed as the most severe and significant industrial dispute in Irish history. Central to the dispute was the workers' right to unionise.

== Background ==
=== Poverty and housing ===
Many of Dublin's workers lived in terrible conditions in tenements. For example, over 830 people lived in just 15 houses in Henrietta Street's Georgian tenements. At 10 Henrietta Street, the Irish Sisters of Charity ran a Magdalene laundry that was inhabited by more than 50 single women. An estimated four million pledges were taken in pawnbrokers every year. The infant mortality rate among the poor was 142 per 1,000 births, extraordinarily high for a European city. The situation was made considerably worse by the high rate of disease in the slums, which was worsened by the lack of health care and cramped living conditions. The most prevalent disease in the Dublin slums at the time was tuberculosis (TB), which spread through tenements very quickly and caused many deaths among the poor. A report, published in 1912, found that TB-related deaths in Ireland were 50% higher than in England or Scotland. The vast majority of TB-related deaths in Ireland occurred among the poorer classes. The report updated a 1903 study by Dr John Lumsden.

Poverty was perpetuated in Dublin by the lack of work for unskilled workers, who did not have any form of representation before trade unions were founded. The unskilled workers often had to compete with one another for work every day, with the job generally going to whoever agreed to work for the lowest wages.

=== James Larkin and formation of ITGWU ===
James Larkin, the main protagonist on the side of the workers in the dispute, was a docker in Liverpool and a union organiser. In 1907, he was sent to Belfast as a local organiser of the British-based National Union of Dock Labourers (NUDL). In Belfast, Larkin organised a strike of dock and transport workers. It was also in Belfast that Larkin began to use the tactic of the sympathetic strike in which workers who were not directly involved in an industrial dispute with employers would go on strike in support of other workers, who were striking. The Belfast strike was moderately successful and boosted Larkin's standing among Irish workers. However, his tactics were highly controversial and so Larkin was transferred to Dublin.

Unskilled workers in Dublin were very much at the mercy of their employers. Employers who suspected workers of trying to organise themselves could blacklist them to destroy, in practice, their ability to gain future employment. Larkin set about organising the unskilled workers of Dublin, which was a cause of concern for the NUDL, which was reluctant to engage in a full-scale industrial dispute with the powerful Dublin employers. It suspended Larkin from the NUDL in 1908. Larkin then left the NUDL and set up an Irish union, the Irish Transport and General Workers' Union (ITGWU).

The ITGWU was the first Irish trade union to cater for both skilled and unskilled workers. In its first few months, it quickly gained popularity and soon spread to other Irish cities. The ITGWU was used as a vehicle for Larkin's syndicalist views. He believed in bringing about a socialist revolution by the establishment of trade unions and calling general strikes.

The ITGWU initially lost several strikes between 1908 and 1910 but after 1913 won strikes involving carters and railway workers like the 1913 Sligo dock strike. Between 1911 and 1913, membership of the ITGWU rose from 4,000 to 10,000, to the alarm of employers.

Larkin had learned from the methods of the 1910 Tonypandy riots and the 1911 Liverpool general transport strike.

=== Larkin, Connolly and Irish Labour Party ===
Another important figure in the rise of an organised workers' movement in Ireland at the time was James Connolly, an Edinburgh-born Marxist of Irish parentage. A talented orator and a fine writer, he became known for his speeches on the streets of Dublin in support of socialism and Irish nationalism. In 1896, Connolly established the Irish Socialist Republican Party and the newspaper The Workers' Republic. In 1911, Connolly was appointed the ITGWU's Belfast organiser. In 1912, Connolly and Larkin formed the Irish Labour Party to represent workers in the imminent Home Rule Bill debate in the British Parliament. Home rule, although passed in the House of Commons, was postponed by the start of the First World War. The plan was then suspended for one year, then indefinitely, after the rise of militant nationalism after the 1916 Rising.

=== William Martin Murphy and employers ===
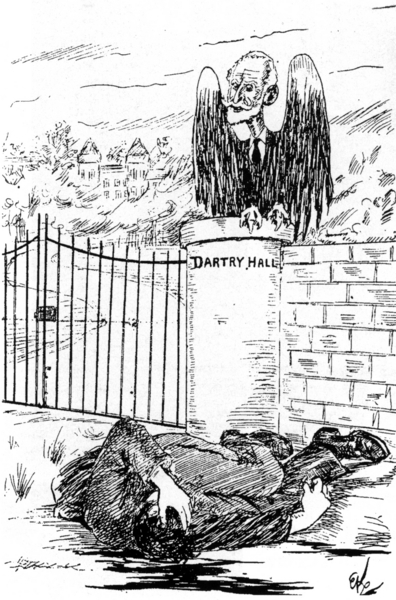
Cartoon of William Martin Murphy preying over James Larkin.

Among the employers in Ireland opposed to trade unions such as Larkin's ITGWU was William Martin Murphy, Ireland's most prominent capitalist, born in Castletownbere, County Cork. In 1913, Murphy was chairman of the Dublin United Tramway Company and owned Clery's department store and the Imperial Hotel. He controlled the Irish Independent, Evening Herald and The Irish Catholic newspapers and was a major shareholder in the B&I Line. Murphy was also a prominent Irish nationalist and a former Home Rule MP in Parliament.

Even today, Murphy's defenders insist that he was a charitable man and a good employer and that his workers received fair wages. However, conditions in his many enterprises were often poor or worse, with employees given only one day off in 10 and being forced to labour up to 17 hours a day. Dublin tramway workers were paid substantially less than their counterparts in Belfast and Liverpool and were subjected to a regime of punitive fines, probationary periods extending for as long as six years and a culture of company surveillance involving the widespread use of informers.

Murphy was not opposed in principle to trade unions, particularly craft unions, but he was vehemently opposed to the ITGWU and saw its leader, Larkin, as a dangerous revolutionary. In July 1913, Murphy presided over a meeting of 300 employers during which a collective response to the rise of trade unionism was agreed. Murphy and the employers were determined not to allow the ITGWU to unionise the Dublin workforce. On 15 August, Murphy dismissed 40 workers whom he suspected of ITGWU membership, followed by another 300 over the next week.

== Middle ==
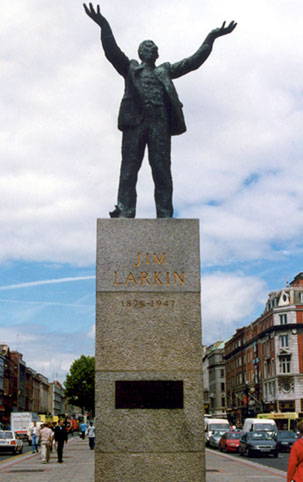
Statue of James Larkin on O'Connell Street (Oisín Kelly 1977)

=== Escalation ===
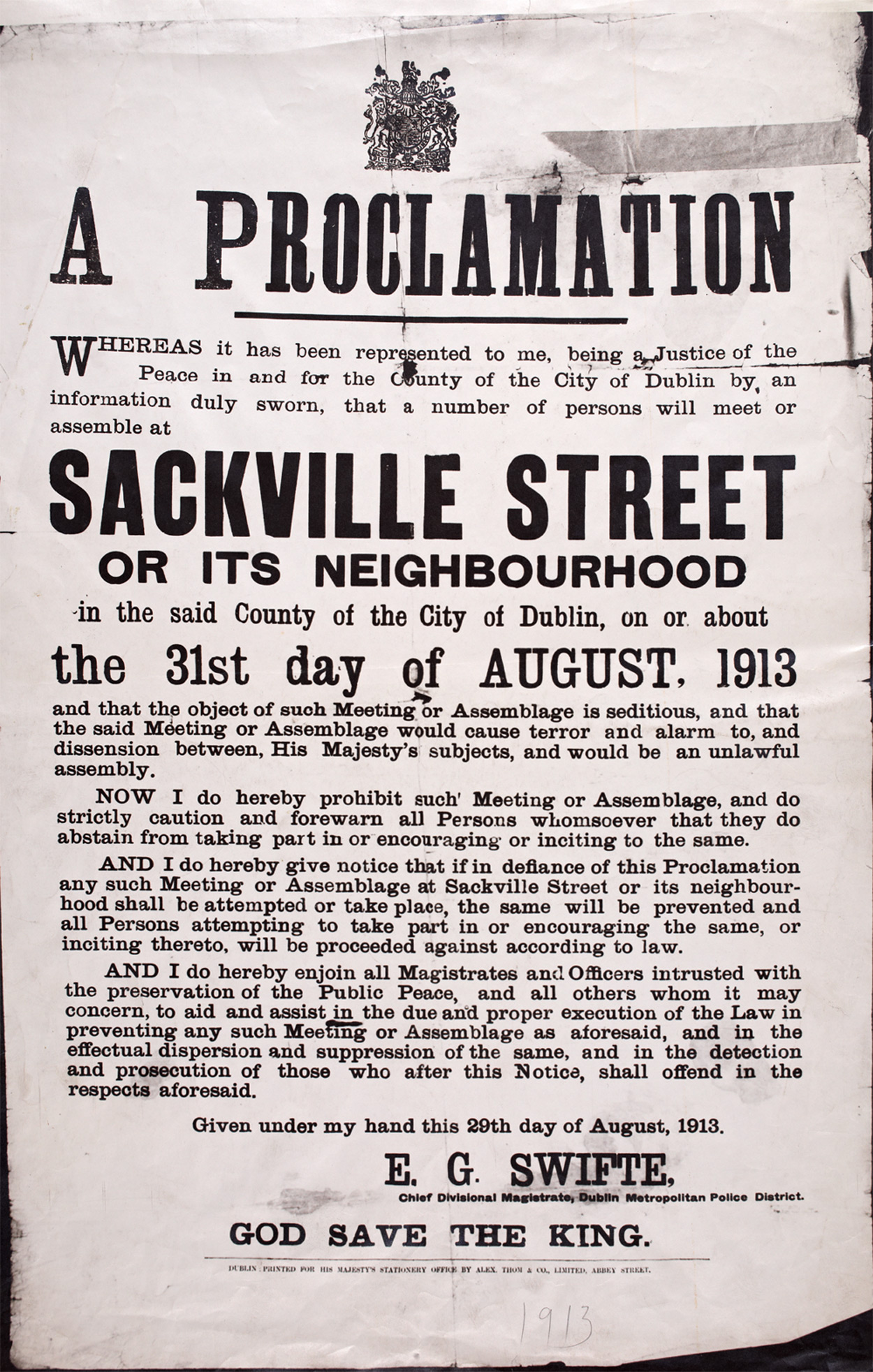
Proclamation banning a meeting in Sackville Street on 31 August 1913

The resulting industrial dispute was the most severe in the history of Ireland. Employers in Dublin locked out their workers and employed blackleg labour from Britain and elsewhere in Ireland. Dublin's workers, despite being some of the poorest in the United Kingdom at the time, applied for help and were sent £150,000 by the British Trades Union Congress (TUC) and other sources in Ireland, doled out dutifully by the ITGWU.

The "Kiddies' Scheme" for the starving children of Irish strikers to be temporarily looked after by British trade unionists was blocked by the Roman Catholic Church and especially the Ancient Order of Hibernians, which claimed that Catholic children would be subject to Protestant or atheist influences when in Britain. The Church supported the employers during the dispute and condemned Larkin as a socialist revolutionary.

Notably, Guinness, the largest employer and biggest exporter in Dublin, refused to lock out its workforce. It refused to join Murphy's group but sent £500 to the employers' fund. It had a policy against sympathetic strikes and expected its workers, whose conditions were far better than the norm in Ireland, not to strike in sympathy; six who had done so were dismissed. It had 400 of its staff who were already ITGWU members and so it had a working relationship with the union. Larkin appealed to have the six reinstated but without success.

The Industrial Workers of the World (IWW) leader, Bill Haywood, was in Paris when he heard of the lockout. He collected 1000 francs to aid the strikers and travelled to Dublin where he addressed a crowd in front of City Hall.

Strikers used mass pickets and intimidation against strike-breakers, who were also violent towards strikers. The Dublin Metropolitan Police carried out a baton charge at worker's rallies. On 31 August 1913, the DMP attacked a meeting on Sackville Street (now known as O'Connell Street) that had been publicly banned. It caused the deaths of two workers: James Nolan and John Byrne. Over 300 more were injured.

The baton charge was a response to the appearance of James Larkin, who had been banned from holding a meeting, to speak for the workers. He had been smuggled into William Martin Murphy's Imperial Hotel by Nellie Gifford, the sister-in-law of Thomas MacDonagh, and spoke from a balcony. The event is remembered as Bloody Sunday, a term used for three subsequent days in 20th-century Ireland and for the murderous charge of police in the Liverpool general strike. Another worker, Alice Brady, was later shot dead by a strike-breaker as she brought home a food parcel from the union office. Michael Byrne, an ITGWU official from Kingstown, died after he had been tortured in a police cell.

Connolly, Larkin and ex-British Army Captain Jack White formed a worker's militia, the Irish Citizen Army, to protect workers' demonstrations.

For seven months, the lock-out affected tens of thousands of Dublin families. Murphy's three main newspapers, the Irish Independent, the Sunday Independent and the Evening Herald, portrayed Larkin as the villain. Influential figures such as Patrick Pearse, Countess Markievicz and William Butler Yeats supported the workers in the media.

== End ==
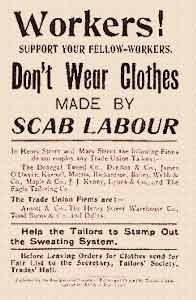

The lock-out eventually concluded in early 1914, when the TUC in Britain rejected Larkin and Connolly's request for a sympathetic strike. Most workers, many of whom were on the brink of starvation, went back to work and signed pledges not to join the ITGWU. It was badly damaged by its defeat in the Lockout and further hit by the departure of Larkin to the United States in 1914 and the execution of Connolly, one of the leaders of the Easter Rising in 1916.

The union was rebuilt by William O'Brien and Thomas Johnson. By 1919, its membership had surpassed that of 1913.

Many of the blacklisted workers joined the British Army since they had no other source of pay to support their families, and they found themselves in the trenches of World War I within the year.

Although the actions of the ITGWU and the smaller UBLU had been unsuccessful in achieving substantially better pay and conditions for workers, they marked a watershed in Irish labour history. The principle of union action and workers' solidarity had been firmly established. No future employer would ever try to "break" a union as Murphy had attempted to with the ITGWU. The lock-out had damaged commercial businesses in Dublin, with many forced to declare bankruptcy.

== W. B. Yeats' "September 1913" ==
September 1913, one of the most famous of W. B. Yeats' poems, was published in The Irish Times during the lock-out. Although the occasion of the poem was the decision of Dublin Corporation not to build a gallery to house the Hugh Lane collection of paintings (Murphy was one of the most vocal opponents of the plan), it has sometimes been viewed by scholars as a commentary on the lock-out. In the poem, Yeats wrote mockingly of commerciants who "fumble in a greasy till, and add the halfpence to the pence" and asked:

Was it for this the wild geese spread
The grey wing upon every tide;
For this that all that blood was shed,
For this Edward Fitzgerald died,
And Robert Emmet and Wolfe Tone,
All that delirium of the brave?
Romantic Ireland's dead and gone,
It's with O'Leary in the grave.

== See also ==
- Great Unrest
