= Kevin Callinan =

Irish trade unionist

General Secretary of Fórsa
- Incumbent
- Assumed office 2019
- Preceded by: Shay Cody, Tom Geraghty and Eoin Ronayne

President of the Irish Congress of Trade Unions
- In office 2021–2023
- Preceded by: Gerry Murphy
- Succeeded by: Justin McCamphill

Personal details
- Born: 29 June 1960 (age 66)
- Occupation: Trade unionist

Kevin Callinan (born 29 June 1960) is an Irish trade unionist who has served as general secretary of Fórsa since 2019. He was president of the Irish Congress of Trade Unions (ICTU) from 2021 to 2023.

== Early life and career ==
Callinan grew up in the Northside area of Dublin, and began his working life with Dublin Corporation, as a library assistant. He joined the Local Government and Public Services Union, and later began working for the union. When the union became part of the new Irish Municipal, Public and Civil Trade Union (IMPACT), he was steadily promoted until he became deputy general secretary.

== Trade union leadership ==
In 2018, IMPACT became part of the new Fórsa union, and Callinan continued as deputy general secretary. The following year, he was designated into the top post of general secretary. Later in the year, he was also elected as secretary of the public service committee of the Irish Congress of Trade Unions (ICTU).

He was elected as president of ICTU in 2021, in which post he called for increased wealth taxes to fund improved public services.

=== 2026 public sector strikes ===
In 2026, Callinan played a leading role in the 2026 Irish public sector strikes as general secretary of Fórsa and chair of the ICTU Public Services Committee. He was involved in coordinating industrial action over public sector pay, including a nationwide strike on 14 October, and subsequently participated in efforts to resume negotiations with the government.

== Personal life ==
Callinan is a fan of Manchester United F.C. and has described Alex Ferguson as one of the people he most admires.

Trade union offices
Preceded by New position	Deputy General Secretary of Fórsa; 2018–2019	Succeeded by Eoin Ronayne and Matt Staunton
Preceded by Shay Cody; Tom Geraghty; Eoin Ronayne	General Secretary of Fórsa; 2019–present	Succeeded by Incumbent
Preceded by Gerry Murphy	President of the Irish Congress of Trade Unions; 2021–2023	Succeeded by Justin McCamphill
