= Housing Agency =

Irish state housing agency

The Housing Agency
- An Gníomhaireacht Tithíocht agus Comhphobail Inbhuanaithe

Non-commercial state agency overview
- Formed: 1 August 2012; 14 years ago
- Preceding agencies: National Building Agency; Affordable Homes Partnership; Centre for Housing Research
- Jurisdiction: Republic of Ireland
- Headquarters: 53 Mount Street Upper, Dublin 2
- Non-commercial state agency executives: Carol Tancock, Chair; Martin Whelan, Chief Executive
- Parent department: Department of Housing, Local Government and Heritage
- Website: www.housingagency.ie

The Housing Agency, legally the Housing and Sustainable Communities Agency, is an Irish non-commercial State agency which supports the delivery of housing and housing services. It operates under the aegis of the Department of Housing, Local Government and Heritage and works with the Department, local authorities, approved housing bodies (AHBs) and other organisations in the housing sector.

The agency provides housing research and policy advice, technical and procurement services, supports housing acquisition and delivery programmes and administers or implements a number of national housing schemes. These include the Mortgage to Rent scheme, the Croí Cónaithe (Cities) apartment viability programme and remediation programmes for homes affected by pyrite and defective building materials.

The organisation began operating on an administrative basis in May 2010 following the rationalisation of three existing housing bodies. It was placed on a statutory footing on 1 August 2012 by the Housing and Sustainable Communities Agency (Establishment) Order 2012.

== History ==
=== Rationalisation of housing bodies ===
The Housing Agency developed from a Government programme to rationalise bodies operating in the housing sector following the financial and property-market crisis of the late 2000s.

In September 2009 the Government announced plans to amalgamate a number of housing-related organisations in order to reduce duplication and consolidate expertise.

The new Housing and Sustainable Communities Agency began operating administratively in May 2010. It brought together functions previously carried out by the Affordable Homes Partnership, the Centre for Housing Research and the National Building Agency.

The Affordable Homes Partnership and Centre for Housing Research were closed, while the National Building Agency was wound down and its remaining functions, staff and assets transferred into the new organisation.

During this interim period, the Agency operated through a company called Housing and Sustainable Communities Limited, as it did not yet possess the statutory powers required to employ staff and perform all of its intended functions directly.

=== Statutory establishment ===
The Local Government (Miscellaneous Provisions) Act 2012 enabled the Minister for the Environment, Community and Local Government to establish the agency formally under the Local Government Services (Corporate Bodies) Act 1971.

The Housing and Sustainable Communities Agency (Establishment) Order 2012 established the body with effect from 1 August 2012. The order specifies that it is to be known in English as the Housing and Sustainable Communities Agency and referred to as the Housing Agency.

Its first annual report after statutory establishment stated that the new structure allowed staff formerly employed through interim arrangements to receive direct contracts of employment with the agency.

== Functions ==
The 2012 establishment order authorised the Housing Agency to provide services on behalf of the housing minister, local authorities and designated public and housing bodies.

The statutory services listed in the order include:

- shared and central services;
- research, advisory, information and training services;
- consultancy, technical and strategic-planning services;
- procurement services;
- agency services;
- preparation and publication of residential-property indices when requested by the Minister;
- social and economic regeneration, including development and improvement of land and infrastructure; and
- assisting in the resolution of problems associated with unfinished housing developments.

Its remit has subsequently expanded through legislation, Government policy and the assignment of additional programmes. The Agency describes its principal contemporary activities as housing research and analysis, housing-supply support, local-authority and AHB support, mortgage programmes, property acquisition, technical and procurement services and building-remediation schemes.

== Housing delivery and acquisition ==
=== Land Aggregation Scheme ===
The Housing Agency became the owner and manager of land acquired through the Land Aggregation Scheme (LAGS), which was introduced in 2010 following the collapse in development-land values.

The scheme allowed local authorities to transfer development land on which they had outstanding Housing Finance Agency loans to the Housing Agency. The State cleared the associated debt, reducing the financial burden on councils whose planned social and affordable housing developments had not proceeded.

A total of 73 sites, comprising approximately 247 hectares, were accepted into the scheme. By 2020 ownership of all 73 had transferred to the Housing Agency.

The Agency assessed the portfolio in 2018 as having the potential to provide approximately 5,365 homes. Development has involved transfers of sites to local authorities and AHBs and cooperation with the Land Development Agency.

By August 2023, 676 social homes had been completed on 14 LAGS sites. The Comptroller and Auditor General found that almost half of the land area remained without formal development plans, despite the scheme having been established thirteen years earlier.

=== Housing acquisitions ===
The Housing Agency operates acquisition programmes through which residential properties can be purchased for social or affordable housing purposes.

A revolving acquisition fund introduced during the 2010s enabled the Agency to purchase properties before transferring them to local authorities or approved housing bodies.

It has also acquired homes under the Cost Rental Tenant in Situ Scheme, introduced in 2023 for households whose landlord intends to sell but who are not eligible for conventional social housing. Under the programme, the State can purchase the property and allow the existing tenant to remain under a cost-rental tenancy. By late 2024 the Housing Agency had acquired 120 homes through the scheme at a total cost of approximately €31.7 million.

== Mortgage to Rent ==
The Housing Agency administers aspects of the Government's Mortgage to Rent scheme, which is designed for homeowners whose mortgages are unsustainable and who qualify for social-housing support.

Under the scheme, the borrower voluntarily surrenders ownership of the property to the mortgage lender. The home is then purchased by an approved provider, while the former owner is permitted to remain in it as a social-housing tenant.

By 30 June 2026, 7,938 cases had been submitted to the scheme and 3,021 transactions had been completed. The Agency reported that 8,242 people, including 3,591 children, were living in homes retained through completed Mortgage to Rent cases.

== Croí Cónaithe ==
The Housing Agency administers the Croí Cónaithe (Cities) scheme on behalf of the Department of Housing.

Launched in 2022 under the Government's Housing for All programme, the scheme provides funding towards apartment developments where the cost of construction exceeds the expected market sale value. It is intended to make otherwise unviable apartment projects capable of proceeding while reserving supported units for sale to owner-occupiers.

The programme covers developments in Dublin, Cork, Galway, Limerick and Waterford and was designed with funding capacity for up to 5,000 apartments.

By July 2026 the Agency said more than 2,600 apartments had been confirmed for delivery under the programme.

== Building remediation ==
The Housing Agency performs significant technical and administrative functions in State programmes intended to address defects in residential construction.

=== Pyrite Remediation Scheme ===
Under the Pyrite Resolution Act 2013, the Housing Agency carries out remediation works on homes accepted into the Pyrite Remediation Scheme on the direction of the Pyrite Resolution Board.

The scheme covers homes significantly damaged by swelling of pyritic material used as hardcore beneath ground-floor slabs. By 2026 the Agency reported that 2,851 dwellings had been remediated since the programme was established.

=== Defective concrete blocks ===
The Agency also has functions under the Defective Concrete Blocks Grant Scheme, which provides assistance for qualifying homes damaged by defective concrete blocks.

Its role includes determining whether a dwelling meets the statutory damage threshold and assessing the appropriate remediation option and grant amount.

The Housing Agency has additionally been assigned technical and administrative work connected with Government programmes addressing fire-safety, structural and water-ingress defects in apartments and duplexes constructed during the period from 1991 to 2013.

== Research and policy ==
Housing research and analysis have formed part of the Agency's remit since its establishment, reflecting the absorption of the former Centre for Housing Research.

The Agency produces research, data and policy analysis on housing supply, affordability, tenure, demographics, sustainable communities and the operation of housing programmes. It also provides advice to the Department of Housing and technical guidance and training to housing practitioners.

Its research and advisory work is intended to support evidence-based policy development and local-authority housing planning.

== Regulation of approved housing bodies ==
From 2014, the Housing Agency acted as the interim regulator of approved housing bodies pending the creation of a statutory regulatory system.

Its Regulation Office administered a voluntary regulatory framework dealing with governance, financial viability, property management and organisational performance.

By the 2018–2019 assessment cycle, 262 AHBs representing 33,945 homes had been assessed through the voluntary framework.

The Housing (Regulation of Approved Housing Bodies) Act 2019 created an independent statutory regulator, the Approved Housing Bodies Regulatory Authority (AHBRA). AHBRA was established in 2021 and assumed responsibility for the statutory registration and regulation of AHBs from 1 January 2022.

Staff of the Housing Agency's voluntary Regulation Office were provided for in the transition to the new regulator.

== Governance ==
The Housing Agency is a non-commercial State agency under the aegis of the Department of Housing, Local Government and Heritage.

It is governed by a board appointed by the Minister for Housing, Local Government and Heritage. The board is responsible for strategic oversight and has an audit and risk committee.

The original 2012 establishment order provided for between seven and nine board members. A 2022 amendment increased the maximum membership to eleven.

Carol Tancock was appointed chair in April 2026, having served as interim chair since June 2025.

Martin Whelan is the Agency's chief executive. He succeeded Bob Jordan, who left the position in September 2024.

== Scrutiny of the Land Aggregation Scheme ==
The management and development of the Land Aggregation Scheme portfolio has been criticised by the Comptroller and Auditor General and the Oireachtas Committee of Public Accounts.

A 2023 Comptroller and Auditor General report found that, thirteen years after the scheme was established, 676 homes had been completed despite the Agency having previously assessed the sites as capable of delivering 5,365 homes. Almost half of the portfolio by land area had no formal development proposal, while the Housing Agency still owned 60 LAGS sites with an estimated market value of more than €56 million.

The report noted that the scheme had succeeded in reducing local-authority debt but concluded that a significant proportion of the State expenditure used to acquire the sites might not ultimately contribute to housing delivery.

The Committee of Public Accounts subsequently expressed concern at the rate of development.

In a 2024 submission to the Public Accounts Committee, the Housing Agency reported that development had been completed on 17 sites, providing 736 homes, with further sites under construction, transferred to the Land Development Agency or at various stages of planning.

== See also ==
- Department of Housing, Local Government and Heritage
- Irish defective block crisis
- Land Development Agency
- Mortgage to Rent
