= Thomas Lawlor =

Thomas Lawlor may refer to:

- Thomas Lawlor (politician) (died 1945), Irish Labour Party politician
- Thomas Lawlor (bass-baritone) (1938–2020), Irish opera singer who retired to the U.S.
- Tom Lawlor (born 1983), American martial artist
