= Mortgage cashback =

Some mortgage lenders, particularly in the United Kingdom, give a one-off lump sum payment to new borrowers at the beginning of a mortgage.

Called cashback, this lump sum is often marketed as free cash, but it is in fact funded by the mortgage interest paid by the borrower.

== Amount ==
The size of the lump sum is dependent on the size of the mortgage and is usually offered only on certain mortgages in a mortgage lender's range.

Cashback on mortgages is popular with first time buyers, who put the cashback towards buying furniture, as these types of buyers often do not have any surplus funds after paying the deposit on their new home.

== Why lenders offer mortgage cashbacks ==
Mortgage lenders often provide incentives to allure new customers or retain existing ones. These incentives, which may not always be advertised, vary significantly in value. They serve as part of a broader strategy to dissuade individuals from choosing a competitor. These offers apply whether you're purchasing or constructing a new house, restructuring your current mortgage, financing an investment property, or considering refinancing.

Here are some of the common promotional offers used by mortgage lenders:

- A discounted interest rate for the first six months or year
- A contribution to your legal fees
- Financial help with any early repayment break fees your current lender might charge
- A parcel of points for a reward scheme
- Reduced home and contents insurance premiums for a limited time
- No mortgage application, set up or documentation fees
- A one-off mortgage cashback payment

== See also ==
- Mortgage to Rent
