= Development of non-profit housing in the United States =

Non-profit housing developers build affordable housing for individuals under-served by the private market. The non-profit housing sector is composed of community development corporations (CDC) and national and regional non-profit housing organizations whose mission is to provide for the needy, the elderly, working households, and others that the private housing market does not adequately serve. Of the total 4.6 million units in the social housing sector, non-profit developers have produced approximately 1.547 million units, or roughly one-third of the total stock. Since non-profit developers seldom have the financial resources or access to capital that for-profit entities do, they often use multiple layers of financing, usually from a variety of sources for both development and operation of these affordable housing units.

== Non-profit development vs. for-profit development ==
Both the non-profit sector and for-profit sector build affordable housing, although missions, operations and financial and technical abilities differ. The core difference between a for-profit and a non-profit organization is that for-profit entities operate to produce returns to owners or shareholders, whereas non-profits either reinvest profits into the organization and/or donate money to serve their mission. This inherent difference of organizational objective dictates the operational strategy of their projects; for-profits are likely to create affordable housing that maximizes profits, where non-profits aim to serve the most vulnerable populations. Examples of strategies that for-profit entities use to maximize profits include locating their projects in neighborhoods with strong rental markets, mixing market-rate units into their buildings to increase operating income, and developing an exit strategy to maximize sale proceeds from their building. Conversely, non-profits are more likely to develop in distressed neighborhoods, dedicate all of their units to low-income tenants and operate projects for the long-term in order to fulfill the mission of affordability.

As a result of their business strategy, non-profits lack the financial and technical resources of for-profits, thus, forcing them to rely on multiple funding sources such as public and private grants and subsidies in order to cover development costs. Using multiple funding sources is risky because it creates complex financing which can be both timely and expensive. Most of these public and private sources exist exclusively for non-profit entities and although this provides an advantage for the non-profit industry, for-profits would often refrain from spending the uncompensated time and effort for such complicated deals.

== Issues during pre-development ==
Pre-development efforts such as acquiring land, forming partnerships, performing due diligence and gaining entitlements is the important first steps developers make before a project is launched. A major problem for non-profit developers is that their deals are thinly capitalized and funding pre-development costs is difficult; these costs include architecture, engineering, site control and feasibility analysis. Non-profits also confront marketability, feasibility and financing problems that usually deter for-profit developers. Pre-development is essential for packaging a project proposal, and funding is necessary to work through any issues during this time. Lack of pre-development funding can lead to weak project proposals and failure to seize opportunities to acquire land. Also, lack of funds increases development risks and decreases the likelihood of attracting capital investors or securing loans from private banks.

Beginning in the 1980s, national, state and local intermediaries formed to improve the financial and technical plight of non-profit housing developers. These organizations improved the mobilization of capital including project and operating support, pre-development finance, and provided technical assistance for finance packaging. As a result, non-profit developers began to increase their technical competence and reduce the risk to potential public and private sector investors.

National intermediaries include organizations such as the Local Initiatives Support Coalition (LISC), the Enterprise Foundation, Neighborhood Reinvestment Corporation (NRC) and the Housing Assistance Council (HAC). These organizations help non-profit housing developers access tax credits, corporate equity investment, secondary mortgage markets and lender commitments as well as offering training courses on real estate development and finance and community organizing and social service provision. Furthermore, these groups help non-profits form partnerships with each other and public and private parties, helping to foster support and funding for non-profit housing development.

== Ownership ==
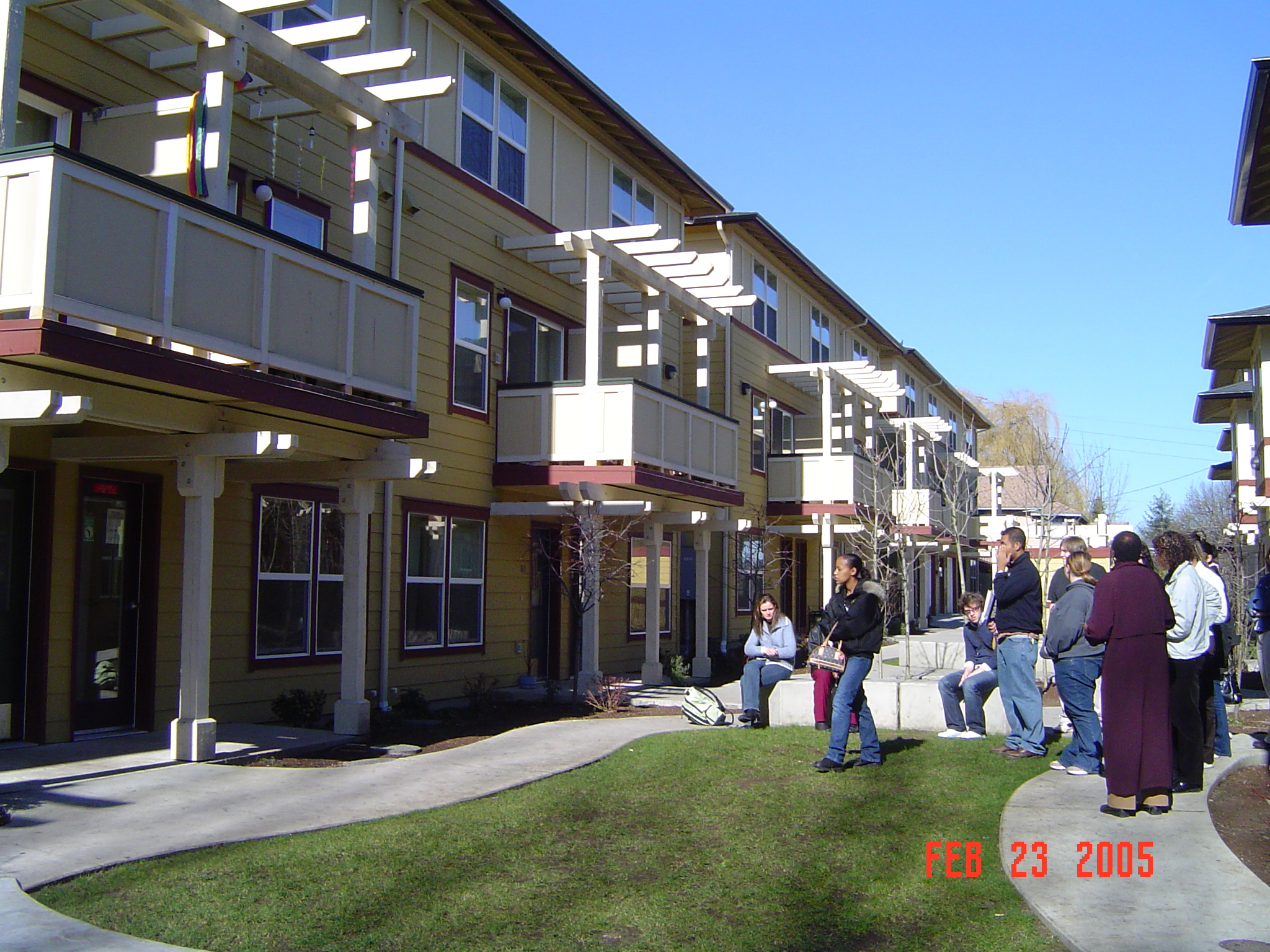
An example of a non-profit multi-family housing development in Tacoma, WA

Non-profits generally form partnerships to develop and own affordable housing projects. Some considerations that non-profits evaluate before creating an ownership entity include the ease and speed with which decisions can be made, efficient provision of property management operations, and the number of investors required to meet equity needs and investment objectives of the investors relative to project cash flow, appreciation, and attitudes towards personal liability. Furthermore, impacts of tax considerations for the ownership entity itself as well as individual investors are also evaluated; this includes apportioning ordinary income liability and capital gains liability.

Forms of legal ownership structures that non-profits create include general partnerships, limited partnerships and limited liability companies (LLC). In a general partnership, two or more entities come together to form a new business entity where each partner is jointly and severally liable for all legal and financial obligations. Also, each member has a right to participate in all partnership decisions unless specified otherwise in the partnership agreement. Partnerships are not tax entities, so all tax consequences are passed directly to individual partners; partners agree to shares of tax consequences, as well as cash flow and appreciation of the project. Limited partnerships are similar to a general partnership except that one or more partners act as a general partner, and the rest of the partners are limited partners. Limited partners are treated differently than general partners in that they are only liable for the capital invested and cannot participate in routine operations or decisions of the partnership without losing their limited liability protection. The partnership agreement defines the responsibility of each partner and how the share profits and tax consequences. An LLC combines the advantages of a corporation for personal liability purposes (liability is limited to the amount of capital invested) and those of a partnership for tax purposes (the entity is not taxed).

== Financing ==
Since non-profits lack the funds to develop and operate their buildings they seek funding from external sources such as local, state and federal governments and private entities. Projects often have layered subsidies in the form of equity, debt, grants and tax concessions (non-profits are tax-exempt entities per section 501(c)(3) of the IRS tax code).

=== Federal ===
==== Low-Income Housing Tax Credit ====
Through LIHTC, investors receive a tax shelter of one dollar ($1) for every tax credit received over a 10-year period. The price of individual tax credits may vary and does not necessarily have to be a 1:1 exchange. The dollar amount of tax credits available to a state is determined by that state's population. Developers apply to state agencies, such as a state Housing Finance Agency, for allocation of tax credits. After receiving the tax credits, the developer then sells the credits to investors. No less than 10% of a state's tax credit allocations must be allocated towards housing development by non-profit organizations.

When selling LIHTCs, developers typically enter into a limited partnership (LP or LLC) with an investor (see discussion above regarding ownership) where the investor becomes 99% partner. While LIHTC can be used to entice investors to a project, they seldom cover total development costs and developers must find additional sources of "gap financing".

==== Section 8 ====
Currently, the Housing Choice Voucher program (through Section 8) provides funds to Public Housing Authorities (PHAs) which pay single and multi-family homeowners the difference between 30% of a tenants’ income and “fair market rent” for providing affordable housing. There are two methods of distributing Section 8 funds: through project-based assistance and through tenant-based assistance. Non-profit organizations are not directly allocated project-based assistance; therefore, a partnership with a PHA is required to take advantage of this program. PHAs may use up to 20% of their voucher allocation towards project-based vouchers.

For non-profit developers that own the land where their housing development is located, Section 8 generally affects a project's income since rental subsidies are being provided. Project-based vouchers allow owners to dedicate a portion or all of their property for affordable rental housing and receive subsidies for doing so. In the event a tenant decides to move out of a subsidized unit, that unit remains affordable. In contrast, with tenant-based vouchers, the subsidy is tied to the tenant, thus the tenant may move from one household to another and still be eligible for housing assistance.

==== Section 202 & Section 811 ====
Section 202 and 811 are HUD programs that provide capital grants for non-profits to finance the construction, rehabilitation or acquisition of supportive housing for the elderly (Section 202) and the disabled (Section 811). These programs ensure that non-profit owners of elderly and disabled housing under these programs will not have to pay for long-term financing, by eliminating the need for debt and rental subsidies in order to support very low-income tenants.

=== Federal pass-through ===
The following funding programs described are provided by HUD, but allocated to states and local jurisdictions for distribution to projects. Housing developers apply for funds through the states and local jurisdictions; however, the subsidy funding actually comes from federal monies.

==== Community Development Block Grant ====
The CDBG program was established by the Housing and Community Development Act of 1974 and replaced eight federal programs which granted funds to states and local communities based on project-specific proposals and had strict regulations on how the money could be allocated. In contrast, the CDBG program allows states and municipalities to budget CDBG funds based on their consolidated plan (a mandatory plan which outlines the community's housing needs, its 5-year strategy, and a 1-year plan focused on resources and implementation). Community participation is required when creating a consolidated plan. HUD then determines how the funds are distributed to the various applicant communities using a couple formulas which measure the extent of the poverty, population, housing overcrowding, age of housing, and population growth lag compared to metropolitan areas.

No less than 70% of CDBG funds granted to a community must benefit low- and moderate-income people (up to 80% AMI, or Area Median Income). The remaining amount may be used to prevent or eliminate slums or blight or for community needs caused by natural disaster. Funds may be used for the acquisition, disposition, or retention of real property; the remodeling of existing residential and non-residential buildings; social services; and economic development.

Local governments are prohibited from utilizing CDBG funds for new residential development (except for “last resort housing”, or when comparable replacement housing for a CDBG project can only be accomplished by new construction). However, non-profit and other organizations that are part of a neighborhood revitalization, community economic development or energy conservation project are permitted to use the funds for housing.

In early 2011, President Barack Obama had proposed a budget for the 2012 fiscal year which included cutting the CDBG program by 7.5%, or $300 million.

==== HOME funds ====
The HOME Investment Partnerships Program, another community block grant program, was created by Congress in 1990 and authorized as Title II of the Cranston-Gonzalez National Affordable Housing Act. Similar to CDBGs, a consolidated plan is required prior to distribution of HOME funds. Unlike CDBGs, HOME funds are granted to states and local jurisdictions specifically for the provision of affordable owned and rental housing for low- and moderate-income households by. States receive 40% of funds and cities and other local governments receive 60%. Allocation of funds is based on a needs based formula (similar to the CDBG program). States are eligible for the higher amount of the formula allotment or $3 million; and local jurisdictions are eligible for at least $500,000. Of the money allocated to a state or local jurisdiction, at least 15% must be distributed to community-based non-profit organizations (Community Housing Development Organizations, or CHDOs).

HOME funds may be used to assist people in buying a home, to develop owner-occupied and rental housing (including acquisition of land and demolition of existing real property to allow for a HOME-funded project; and payment relocation expenses), to rehabilitate existing homes, and to provide “tenant-based rental assistance” (or TBRA). Development projects must be aimed towards households with no more than 80% AMI, and for rental projects, at least 90% of the benefiting families must have an income less than 60% AMI. For rental projects with five or more units being assisted, at least 20% of the households must have incomes less than 50% AMI.

Other requirements for HOME funds include the match of funds from other sources, minimum affordability terms for projects, limits on TBRA, and a time limit on when the funds must be allocated and spent by. For every dollar of HOME funds received, jurisdictions must provide a 25 cents match in non-federal sources. Newly constructed rental housing must remain affordable for at least 20 years. For owner-occupied housing (newly constructed and remodeled), acquired rental housing, and remodeled rental housing, the minimum affordability term ranges from 5 to 15 years depending on the amount of funds received in relation to the number of assisted units. Unlike Section 8 vouchers, TBRA is limited to two years and may not be used for project-based rental assistance. Finally, HOME funds must be committed (including reserving funds for CHDOs) within two years and be spent within five years.

Oftentimes, HOME funds is not enough to bring rents down to the maximum allowed based on AMI; therefore additional funding must be acquired and used in conjunction with HOME funds, such as the LIHTC. Both HOME and CDBG funds have been criticized for being unable to provide subsidies large enough to provide housing for households with incomes equal to or less than 30% AMI.

=== Other public funding sources ===
==== Tax-exempt bonds ====
The purpose of tax-exempt bonds, or private activity bonds, is to promote job creation and increase economic development in local areas; therefore, they are not limited to housing creation. These bonds are issued by state Housing Finance Agencies (similar to LIHTCs) or by local government development agencies. Since the interest on the bonds is exempt from state and local taxes, lenders who purchase the bonds pass on this savings onto borrowers through lower interest rates. Tax-exempt bonds are similar to conventional loans in that the borrower must pay back the principle plus interest to the lender; however, tax-exempt bonds typically have longer financing periods compared to conventional loans. In general, this type of bonding is utilized for projects over one million dollars.

There are bonds which exist exclusively for use by non-profit organizations to provide residential rental housing. When used for such purposes, the IRS code places use limitations on at least 95% of the bond proceeds. Among the uses permitted, one places minimum affordable occupancy levels. Similar to LIHTCs, at least 40% of the units must be occupied by households with incomes 60% AMI or less, or at least 20% of the units must be occupied households with no more than 50% AMI.

The federal government limits the amount of tax-exempt bonds a state can issue within a given year. Due to the 2008 financial crisis, state housing finance agencies became "virtually frozen… out of the Housing Bond market", causing many agencies to either suspend or significantly decrease the amount of bonds issued.

==== Housing trust funds ====
Housing trust funds (HTFs) are established at all levels of government (national, state, county and local). These funds are created specifically for the provision of affordable housing to low- and moderate-income households and are based on collected revenue sources. HTFs generally have far fewer restrictions than other forms of public financing and may be used for a wide range of development activities. For example, eligible activities under the National Housing Trust Fund include but are not limited to: property acquisition, development/rehabilitation costs, construction costs, and some operating expenses.

Most trust funds have a minimum requirement of affordability ranging from 5 to 30 years. A majority of the HTFs target those at and below 80% AMI; however, approximately a quarter of HTFs target the homeless or those with incomes at 50% AMI or below.

Similar to Section 8 funds, since trust funds are generally administered by governmental or quasi-governmental agencies, to utilize the funds, non-profit development projects much be completed in partnership with housing authorities, community development departments or corporations, redevelopment agencies, or a number of other possible governing agencies. (For more information regarding governing agencies, see Housing trust fund – Administration or governance)

=== Private ===
Private assistance in the form of grants and low-interest loans for affordable housing is usually funded by local community foundations and national non-profits. Local community foundations focus primarily on improving specific neighborhoods, whereas national non-profits have broader objectives. For-profit corporations also offer funding opportunities through related non-profit foundations or partnerships such as Living Cities, a housing fund created by the partnership of financial institutions, insurance companies and HUD. Also, if a private company conducts a large share of their business in a particular area they may also contribute land, money and expertise to non-profit developers.

== Operation ==
In the final phase of development the non-profit sponsor establishes the long-term viability of the project. This includes securing permanent financing for the project and planning for future building operations and management. Non-profits will either manage the building themselves or contract a management company to oversee operations. Property management requires marketing, tenant selection, rent collection, maintenance, finance, rule enforcement, strategic planning, etc.

A critical component of operating affordable housing is managing a project's financing. Developers create an operating model to determine a property's financial viability through projected future cash flows. An operating model computes annual cash flow or operating income by subtracting operating expenses (maintenance, water, sewer, electricity, insurance, etc.) from income generated by rents and other income such as laundry, vending and parking services. Positive operating income is necessary to cover the mortgage payments on the property and if income is not enough to cover debt than the bank can foreclose on the property. Lenders measure the ability of a project's operating income to make mortgage payments by using a debt-service-coverage ratio, which is a calculation of annual operating income divided by annual mortgage payments; the higher the ratio the lower the risk of project foreclosure.

Maintaining stable revenue throughout the lifetime is challenging for a non-profit. Often, affordable housing exists in weak housing markets and in neighborhoods characterized by high crime rates, vacant and abandoned properties and low rent prices. Housing in these markets is generally unattractive and thus difficult to rent, therefore buildings lose money due to high vacancy. Projects in poor markets can also experience high costs associated with increased screening of renters and preparation of units due to high tenant turnover. Also, affordable projects frequently rely on government subsidies to cover the portion of rent that low-income tenants cannot afford (usually the difference between 30% of tenant income and market rents); projects are exposed to risk of losing future cash flows if governments cut tenant assistance programs. Furthermore, inadequate property management can affect operating income through the ineffectiveness of collecting rents or managing costs.

Risks associated with loss of operating income are the physical deterioration of the building and inability to meet debt obligations. Lack of revenue inhibits the property manager's ability to make repairs or capital improvements to the building, causing the property to fall into disrepair. To mitigate this risk, non-profit owners often establish a reserve account to cover capital expenditures in the event that a property does not generate enough income to cover maintenance costs. Furthermore, in the event that debt service cannot be covered, the lender can foreclose on the property, taking the affordable units off of the market and hurting the mission of the non-profit. Non-profits can reduce the risk of foreclosure by securing long-term debt with public entities because public entities share similar missions as the non-profit and will be more inclined to restructure the financing, rather than foreclosing. Also, if the non-profit owns multiple buildings, diversifying the location of the buildings, type of tenants and source of project funding can diminish the risk of the entire organization failing if subsidies run dry or markets collapse.
