= Peter McLoone =

Irish trade union leader

Peter McLoone (born 1950) is a former Irish trade union leader.

Born in Ballyshannon, McLoone began working as a psychiatric nurse in 1969. He joined the Local Government and Public Services Union, and in 1978 was elected as its assistant general secretary. This became part of the Irish Municipal, Public and Civil Trade Union (IMPACT), and in 1996 he was elected as the union's general secretary.

McLoone was a leading proponent of the Irish "Social Partnership" strategy, and generally worked closely with governments during his tenure. In 2005, he was chosen as the chair of FÁS. He resigned following an expenses scandal at the body, although he claimed that he was unaware of any excessive expense claims.

McLoone served as president of the Irish Congress of Trade Unions (ICTU) from 2005 until 2007, and later as chair of the ICTU's public services committee. In 2009, the Social Partnership agreements collapsed, and he retired from his trade union posts the following year. He joined the Labour Relations Commission, the Irish Times trust, and became a governor of the National College of Ireland.

McLoone's brother, Michael, served as County Manager for Donegal County Council.

Trade union offices
Preceded by Phil Flynn	General Secretary of IMPACT; 1996 – 2010	Succeeded by Shay Cody
Preceded by Brendan Mackin	President of the Irish Congress of Trade Unions; 2005 – 2007	Succeeded by Patricia McKeown
Political offices
Preceded by Brian Geoghegan	Chair of FÁS; 2005–2009	Succeeded by Paul O'Toole
