= Dan Murphy (trade unionist) =

Daniel Anthony Murphy (born 10 November 1946) is a former Irish trade union leader.

Born in Cork, Murphy left school at the age of nineteen, and through competitive examination, secured a position as an Executive Officer in the Aviation Division of the (then) Department of Transport & Power. He moved to the Personnel Division in 1968 but, before the end of the year, left to take up the post of General Secretary of a relatively small Civil Servants'Trade Union, then known as "The Executive & Higher Officers Association", later the "Civil Service Executive Union" & then the "Public Service Executive Union".

Murphy was one of the first Leaders of Civil & Public Service Trade Unions to recognise the significance of affiliating with the Irish Congress of Trades Unions (ICTU), and within a few years, his Association/Union joined ICTU. He was a Founder-Member, and for many years, Secretary, of the highly significant Public Services Committee, which had a major influence on Public Pay Policy.

Despite the reality that his own Union had only a tiny number of votes in elections to the Executive Council of ICTU, Murphy consistently secured a place on that Council, and was later elected as President of the ICTU in 1981/82. He championed the Social Partnership system. On his retirement in 2009, Fiona Lee said that "It is doubtful if we could have had Social Partnership for the past 20 years without Dan Murphy's vision and dedication". In 2010, he was appointed as chair of the civil service platform for implementing the Croke Park Agreement.

Trade union offices
Preceded by Michael Magner	General Secretary of the Public Service Executive Union; 1968–2009	Succeeded by Tom Geraghty
Preceded by Jack Curlis	President of the Irish Congress of Trade Unions; 1981–1982	Succeeded by David Wylie
