= Ryanair and unions =

The Irish airline Ryanair recognises several pilot unions, while it has more limited recognition of cabin-crew and on ground staff. In 2017, Ryanair reversed its long time anti-union stance and recognized pilot unions for the first time.

== Ireland ==
Ryanair faced down Irish trade unions on multiple occasions. In the 1990s against SIPTU after a strike in Dublin Airport, and in a landmark ruling "Ryanair v. The Labour Court", the court determined Ryanair had a right to operate a non-union company.

In 2022 Ryanair announced a tentative collective agreement with pilots union Fórsa union.

== Belgium ==
In 2011, Belgium cabin-crew members of Ryanair sued in local court, demanding that Ryanair observe Belgian labour laws instead of Irish labour laws, the country of the headquarters.

== Italy ==
In August 2018, Ryanair signed its first agreement with Italian pilot union ANPAC.
