= Irish Municipal, Public and Civil Trade Union =

Former Irish trade union (1991-2018)

IMPACT
- Irish Municipal, Public and Civil Trade Union
- Merged into: Fórsa
- Founded: 1991
- Dissolved: 2018
- Headquarters: Nerney's Court, Dublin, Ireland
- Location: Ireland
- Members: 63,626
- Affiliations: ICTU, PSI

The Irish Municipal, Public and Civil Trade Union (IMPACT) was a trade union in the Republic of Ireland. It primarily organised workers in education, health, local government and the civil service. It also had members who worked for voluntary and community organisations, telecommunications and aviation.

== History ==
The union was founded in 1991 by the merger of the Local Government and Public Services Union, the Union of Professional and Technical Civil Servants and the Irish Municipal Employees Trade Union. Unlike many Irish unions, it focused on the Republic of Ireland, although some pilots and cabin crew were based outside the Republic.

IMPACT's stated aims were to promote the interests of IMPACT members, maintain and improve their conditions of employment, provide and maintain services to members, promote excellence and effectiveness in public services, promote equality of opportunity in the workplace and promote equity and equality in society.

The union's retired members' vocational group was active in campaigns to protect retirement incomes and public services for retired workers and older people. IMPACT was affiliated to Age Action Ireland and has links with Active Retirement Ireland.

Three per cent of every member’s union subscriptions – including those of retired members - were assigned to IMPACT's developing world fund, which donated over €5.5 million to development, educational and solidarity projects in the developing world since its establishment in 1981.

At the start of 2018, IMPACT merged with the Civil and Public Services Union and the Public Service Executive Union to form Fórsa.

== Croke Park agreement ==
IMPACT was one of the unions involved in the negotiation of the Public Service Agreement 2010-2014 (better known as the Croke Park agreement). The agreement requires public sector workers to cooperate with reforms to reduce the costs of public services. The agreement prevents any additional pay cuts to public sector salaries (which were reduced in 2009 by an average of 14%)and prohibits compulsory redundancies. Since 2008, the number of public sector workers has been reduced by approximately 20,000. In June 2012, the Croke Park implementation body, which oversees the implementation of the agreement, reported an annualised reduction of just under €1.5bn in payroll and non-pay related costs in the Irish public sector.

== General Secretaries ==
1991: Phil Flynn
1995: Peter McLoone
2010: Shay Cody
