= Union of Professional and Technical Civil Servants =

- Dissolved: 1991
- Type: Trade union

The Union of Professional and Technical Civil Servants was a trade union representing civil servants in Ireland.

The union was founded in 1919 as the Institution of Professional Civil Servants, a name it shared with a British union founded the same year.

In 1979, the union renamed itself as the "Union of Professional and Technical Civil Servants". By 1990, it had more than 7,000 members.

In 1991, the union amalgamated with the Irish Municipal Employees' Trade Union and the Local Government and Public Services Union, forming the Irish Municipal, Public and Civil Trade Union.

== General Secretaries ==
1967: Ralph Pares
1975: John C. Duffy
1977: Greg Maxwell
