= Katie Morgan (trade unionist) =

Irish trade union official

Katie Morgan is an Irish trade union official who has served as a deputy general secretary of Fórsa since January 2026. She is also a vice-president of the Irish Congress of Trade Unions (ICTU) and a member of the board of the Health and Safety Authority.

Morgan previously headed Fórsa's Services and Enterprises Division, where her responsibilities included industrial relations and organising in state agencies, former state enterprises, private-sector employment and the community and voluntary sector.

== Trade union career ==
Morgan worked as an organiser and later an assistant general secretary with Fórsa. By 2019 she was involved in the union's campaigning in the early-years childcare sector, where Fórsa was seeking increased State investment and improved pay and professional recognition for childcare workers.

She was listed as an assistant general secretary in Fórsa's 2018–2020 biennial report.

In December 2020, Fórsa's National Executive approved her appointment as a national secretary, with responsibility for the union's Services and Enterprises Division. She subsequently became head of the division in 2022.

As head of Services and Enterprises, Morgan represented workers in aviation, State agencies, commercial semi-State companies and private-sector employment. She was involved in negotiations concerning pilots employed by Emerald Airlines, which operates Aer Lingus Regional. In July 2023, planned strike action by pilots was suspended to allow negotiations with management, with Morgan stating that the union was seeking a collective labour agreement covering pilots' terms and conditions.

She was also involved in negotiations concerning the transfer of Irish Coast Guard search-and-rescue aviation personnel after the State awarded a new service contract to Bristow Ireland. Fórsa sought guarantees that existing pilots and winch crew would transfer with their terms and seniority protected under employment-transfer rules.

An agreement between Bristow and Fórsa covering the transfer was announced in January 2024. Morgan described the agreement as providing job security and protection for existing pay, terms and conditions.

Morgan has also represented Fórsa in discussions concerning union recognition. In 2025 she participated in an Industrial Relations News conference discussion with Ryanair executive Darrell Hughes on the airline's experience of recognising trade unions following its 2017 change of policy.

That year she also led Fórsa's public campaign seeking trade-union recognition at the Land Development Agency. In May 2025, RTÉ reported that Morgan had criticised the State body for refusing to allow union representatives access to its workplace or agree a collective-bargaining arrangement.

In late 2025, Fórsa appointed Morgan as deputy general secretary following an internal competition and ratification by its National Executive Committee. She succeeded Matt Staunton and took up the position on 1 January 2026. Her responsibilities include operations, campaigns and communications.

== Irish Congress of Trade Unions ==
Morgan was elected to the ICTU Executive Council in 2021. She subsequently became one of Congress's vice-presidents and has served on its General Purposes Committee, Executive Council and Health and Safety Committee.

As a vice-president she was involved in the ICTU-led Better in a Trade Union organising campaign and the establishment of an annual Trade Union Week. ICTU credited Morgan with bringing affiliated unions together to manage the campaign and its 2024 and 2025 Trade Union Weeks.

From 2024 she formed part of the ICTU delegation to the Labour Employer Economic Forum, the State's high-level forum bringing together government, trade unions and employers. In 2026 she appeared with senior ICTU representatives at Government Buildings during discussions over pay, living standards and possible industrial action.

== Health and Safety Authority ==
Morgan was appointed to the board of the Health and Safety Authority for a three-year term beginning on 20 December 2025. The authority lists her as one of its employee representatives.

== See also ==
- Fórsa
- Irish Congress of Trade Unions
