= Harold O'Sullivan =

Irish trade union leader and local historian

Harold O'Sullivan (1924 – 20 October 2009) was an Irish trade union leader and local historian.

Born in Dublin, O'Sullivan was educated at a Christian Brothers school, then joined the Irish Defence Forces during The Emergency, serving in the Cavalry Corps. In 1946, he left the Army to work for Bord na Móna, also joining the Local Government and Public Services Union (LGPSU). He soon transferred to work for Kildare County Council as a health inspector, then moved to Dundalk to work for Louth County Council.

O'Sullivan gradually came to prominence in the LGPSU, serving on its executive committee and as president from 1962 before he was elected as general secretary in 1964, in which role he was known for his calls for a national wages policy. He devoted much time to the Irish Congress of Trade Unions (ICTU), serving on its executive from 1968, as its first official representative to the Union of Students in Ireland in 1972, and as President of ICTU in 1978. While in that post, he supported two large demonstrations in favour of a more progressive tax system, but withdrew support from a third.

In 1983, O'Sullivan stood down from his trade union posts to join the National Planning Board. He later became acting director-general of the Institute for Industrial Research and Standards, and completed a master's degree and doctorate with Trinity College Dublin, with a focus on Irish history. He published several books on local history, including History of Local Government in the County of Louth and John Bellew: a Seventeenth-Century Man of Many Parts.

O'Sullivan died in 2009. In 2016, a workspace in Louth County Library was dedicated to his memory.

Trade union offices
Preceded by Thomas Reynolds	General Secretary of the Local Government and Public Services Union; 1964 – 1983	Succeeded by Phil Flynn
Preceded by John Mulhall	President of the Irish Congress of Trade Unions; 1978 – 1979	Succeeded by Jack Curlis
