= Civil and Public Services Union =

Former Irish public sector trade union (1922–2018)

Civil Public and Services Union
- Merged into: Fórsa
- Founded: 1922
- Dissolved: 2018
- Headquarters: Dublin, Ireland
- Location: Ireland
- Members: 13,775
- Affiliations: ICTU

The Civil and Public Services Union (CPSU) was an Irish trade union for clerical and administrative grades in the civil service, the wider public sector and the private sector. It was a member of the Irish Congress of Trade Unions.

The union was founded in 1922 by the Dublin branch of the Civil Service Clerical Association.

At the start of 2018, the CPSU merged with the Irish Municipal, Public and Civil Trade Union and the Public Service Executive Union to form Fórsa.

== General Secretaries ==
1922: Tom O'Shea
1924: D. J. Cregan
1924: J. Hogan
1926: J. Burke
1928: Archie Heron
1941: D. Ó Connáill
1948: D. A. Morrissey
1953: W. J. Farrell
1961: H. V. Murtagh
1967: P. B. Gillespie
1969: Billy Lynch
1988: John O'Dowd
1999: Blair Horan
2012: Éoin Ronayne
