= Irish Municipal Employees' Trade Union =

The Irish Municipal Employees' Trade Union was a trade union representing employees of Dublin City Council in Ireland.

The union was founded in 1883 as the United Corporation Workmen of Dublin Trade Union. It joined the Irish Trades Union Congress in 1894, and took the name "Irish Municipal Employees' Trade Union" in 1918. In 1942, the Dublin Fire Brigade Men's Trade Union merged into it.

The union claimed that it should exclusively be able to negotiate on behalf of workers with Dublin City Council, something opposed by the Workers' Union of Ireland and the Irish Transport and General Workers' Union. Despite this, its membership steadily grew, from 670 in 1900, to 1,768 in 1920 and 2,521 in 1970.

In 1991, the union merged with the Local Government and Public Services Union and the Union of Professional and Technical Civil Servants to form the Irish Municipal, Public and Civil Trade Union.

== General Secretaries ==
1897: Robert Canty
1914: Dan Magee
1920: Thomas Lawlor
1939: Frank Foley
1949: Bernard Colgan
1978: Sean Redmond
