= Public Service Executive Union =

Former Irish public service trade union (1890-2018)

- Merged into: Fórsa
- Founded: 1890
- Dissolved: 2018
- Headquarters: 30 Merrion Square, Dublin
- Location: Ireland
- Members: 10,000
- Publication: Executive Committee Newsletter
- Affiliations: Irish Congress of Trade Unions

The Public Service Executive Union (PSEU) was a trade union representing civil servants in Ireland.

The union originated in 1890, when a Dublin branch of the Second Division Civil Servants' Association was founded. In 1918, it became the independent Association of Executive Officers of the Civil Service In 1931, it was renamed as the Civil Service Executive and Higher Officers' Association. The union was active in the Civil Service Federation and its successor, the Civil Service Alliance, but didn't affiliate to the Irish Congress of Trade Unions until 1969. In 1943, the union began publishing a monthly journal, Public Service Review.

From 400 members in 1922 to 894 by 1946 and 1,538 in 1970, the union's membership increased over time. In 1972, the union was again renamed, as the Civil Service Executive Association, then in 1974 it became the Civil Service Executive Union. Under the leadership of Dan Murphy, it embarked on a series of mergers, absorbing Cómhaltas Cána in 1979, the Administrative Officers' Association, the Association of Third Secretaries - Foreign Affairs, and the District Court Clerks - Provincial and Metropolitan in 1980, the Social Welfare Officers' Association in 1981, and the Irish Customs and Excise Union in 1989.

Following a membership ballot in 2017, the union merged with the Civil and Public Services Union and the Irish Municipal, Public and Civil Trade Union to form Fórsa on 1 January 2018.

== General Secretaries ==
1949: Ben O'Quigley
1961: Dympna Headen
1964: Michael Magner
1968: Dan Murphy
2009: Tom Geraghty
