= Phil Flynn =

Irish businessman

Philip Flynn (born 1940 in Dundalk, Ireland) is an Irish businessman. He was previously a vice-president of Sinn Féin, a trade unionist, an industrial relations consultant, a government advisor and a financier. He was the eldest of five children of a nationalist mother and Fine Gael father.

He joined Sinn Féin at the age of 14 and lent support to some of those involved in the IRA Border campaign of the 1950s. He was taken in for police questioning on a number of occasions owing to his political activities. In 1974, he was tried with IRA membership, but acquitted, by the Special Criminal Court. During the trial, the state alleged that he was IRA Director of Finance. In Liverpool, he was arrested and held for three days under the Prevention of Terrorism Act. In 1975, he came to public prominence when he acted as a mediator in the Tiede Herrema kidnap siege.

In 1984, he was elected general secretary of the Local Government and Public Services Union. His election caused problems for the Fine Gael-Labour administration as Flynn was also vice-president of Sinn Féin and as such, government officials and ministers refused to talk to him. Shortly after, he was elected to the executive of the Irish Congress of Trade Unions (ICTU). In the same year, he stepped down as Sinn Féin vice-president, telling the party's Ard fheis that his experience and support would always be available to the movement.

In 1987, he was reported to have resigned from Sinn Féin. From 1993 to 1995, he was president of ICTU, representing the Irish Municipal Public and Civil Trade Union. In 1996, he was appointed chairman of the Industrial Credit Corporation (ICC) by Ruairi Quinn. ICC was subsequently acquired by the Bank of Scotland in 2001.

In February 2005, Flynn's office was raided by officers of the Criminal Assets Bureau (CAB) as part of an investigation into alleged IRA money-laundering. Flynn was a non-executive directors Chesterton Finance Company Ltd, a company at the centre of the CAB investigation. As a result, he resigned as chairman of the Irish Government committee on decentralisation, as non-executive chairman of Bank of Scotland (Ireland) and as director of the VHI. During the search of his officers, Flynn was found to be the illegal possession of a pen gun and mini tear gas canisters. At related court hearing In December 2005, he admitted to possession and agreed to pay €5,000 to a charity.

Ted Cunningham, the Cork based financial adviser convicted of laundering £3 million of the sum stolen by the IRA in the 2004 Northern Bank robbery stated "Phil Flynn is the boss behind everything" in a garda interview about the robbery introduced in evidence in Cunningham's trial.

Party political offices
Preceded by Gerry Adams and Dáithí Ó Conaill	Vice President of Sinn Féin; 1983–1985	Succeeded by John Joe McGirl
Trade union offices
Preceded by Harold O'Sullivan	General Secretary of the Local Government and Public Services Union; 1984–1991	Post abolished
New post	General Secretary of IMPACT; 1991–1995	Succeeded by Peter McLoone
Preceded by Tom Douglas	President of the Irish Congress of Trade Unions; 1993–1995	Succeeded by John Freeman
