= Land Development Agency =

Irish state housing and land-development agency

- An Ghníomhaireacht um Fhorbairt Talún

Agency overview
- Formed: 13 September 2018; 8 years ago
- Jurisdiction: Republic of Ireland
- Headquarters: George's Court, 54–62 Townsend Street, Dublin 2
- Agency executives: Cormac O'Rourke, Chair; John Coleman, Chief executive
- Parent department: Department of Housing, Local Government and Heritage
- Website: lda.ie

The Land Development Agency (LDA; An Ghníomhaireacht um Fhorbairt Talún) is an Irish State-owned housing and land-development body. It was established by the Government in September 2018 to coordinate the use of public land, assemble land for development and increase the supply of housing, particularly affordable and social housing.

The agency was initially established under the Local Government Services (Corporate Bodies) Act 1971 by the Land Development Agency (Establishment) Order 2018. The Land Development Agency Act 2021 subsequently placed the organisation on a statutory footing and provided for a new State-owned designated activity company to carry out its functions. The original 2018 body was dissolved on 31 March 2022 and its functions, assets, liabilities and staff transferred to the statutory agency.

The LDA develops housing directly on State-owned and acquired land and also partners with private housebuilders through programmes such as Project Tosaigh. By July 2026, it reported that it had completed 3,215 homes since 2022, had more than 6,500 homes under construction across over 20 developments and had a development pipeline capable of delivering more than 28,000 additional homes.

== History ==
=== Establishment ===
The Government announced the creation of the LDA on 13 September 2018 as part of Project Ireland 2040. It was initially capitalised with €1.25 billion and given responsibility for developing under-used State land and assembling strategic landbanks for future housing development.

At its launch, the Government stated an ambition for the agency to facilitate the delivery of approximately 150,000 homes over 20 years. Taoiseach Leo Varadkar compared the potential significance of the body with the establishment of State enterprises such as the Electricity Supply Board, Aer Lingus and IDA Ireland.

John Coleman, previously chief financial officer of the National Asset Management Agency (NAMA), became interim chief executive when the LDA was established and was formally appointed chief executive in September 2019.

=== Statutory agency ===
The Land Development Agency Act 2021 was enacted in July 2021. Its stated purposes included increasing the supply of land available for housing, developing and regenerating public land, managing housing, assisting local authorities and establishing a national register of relevant public land.

The legislation also gave the agency powers to acquire land, including rights of first refusal over certain public land proposed for disposal and powers of compulsory purchase. It imposed affordability requirements on certain housing developments on relevant public land and allowed the LDA to establish subsidiary companies.

The new statutory LDA was incorporated in March 2022. The earlier body created in 2018 was formally dissolved on 31 March 2022.

== Functions and powers ==
The LDA's statutory functions include:

- developing and regenerating State and other land for housing;
- developing, owning and managing housing;
- working jointly with local authorities, State bodies and private-sector developers;
- acquiring land for development;
- providing services and expertise to local authorities;
- maintaining a register of relevant public land;
- reporting to Government on public sites with housing-development potential; and
- using compulsory-purchase powers where permitted by law.

Under the 2021 Act, public bodies covered by the legislation generally must notify the LDA before disposing of relevant public land. The agency can assess whether the land should instead be retained or acquired for housing or other purposes falling within its mandate.

The Act defines relevant public bodies broadly and includes government departments, local authorities and State organisations such as An Post, Bord na Móna, Coillte, Córas Iompair Éireann, daa, ESB, RTÉ and the Central Bank of Ireland.

== Housing programmes ==
=== Direct development ===
A central part of the LDA's remit is the direct development of housing on State-owned or acquired sites.

Projects have included the redevelopment of former State properties such as St Kevin's Hospital in Cork, Devoy Barracks in Naas and the former Central Mental Hospital site in Dundrum, Dublin. The agency has also developed housing in partnership with local authorities, including the large Shanganagh development in south County Dublin.

The Shanganagh development, undertaken with Dún Laoghaire–Rathdown County Council, comprises approximately 600 social, cost-rental and affordable homes and was one of the first major schemes on which the LDA delivered homes directly.

The LDA has also acquired large development sites independently of other public bodies. In December 2023 it completed the purchase of land at Clongriffin in north Dublin with the potential for more than 2,000 homes.

In 2025, as part of the winding down of NAMA, assets transferred to the LDA included 1,366 social homes and two large development sites capable of accommodating up to approximately 4,500 homes.

=== Project Tosaigh ===
Project Tosaigh was launched in late 2021 as part of the Government's Housing for All strategy. It was designed to unlock private housing developments which had planning permission but had stalled because of financing, viability or other constraints.

Under the programme, the LDA enters agreements with private housebuilders to provide financial certainty or construction funding, with the resulting homes subsequently used for cost rental or affordable purchase. The original programme targeted 5,000 homes by the end of 2026.

Project Tosaigh developments have involved companies including Cairn Homes, Glenveagh, Ballymore, O'Flynn Group and other private developers.

By 2026, the programme included projects such as 607 cost-rental apartments at Seven Mills in Dublin 22, 542 homes at Southwest Gate on the Naas Road and 779 apartments at Richmond Village in Fairview.

== Cost-rental housing ==
The LDA became one of the State's principal providers of cost-rental housing, a tenure in which rent is linked to the cost of providing, financing and maintaining the homes rather than to prevailing market rents.

Its first cost-rental homes were offered at Archers Wood in Delgany, County Wicklow, in early 2023. The initial 142-home scheme offered rents that the agency said were approximately 30 per cent below comparable market rents.

The first LDA cost-rental houses in Dublin were released at Parklands in Citywest in March 2023. Demand exceeded the number of homes available, and RTÉ reported rents of up to approximately 57 per cent below prevailing local market levels.

By July 2026 approximately 90 per cent of the homes completed by the agency were being made available on a cost-rental basis.

== Public land register ==
Section 50 of the 2021 Act requires the LDA to establish and maintain a Register of Relevant Public Land. The register is an online mapping system identifying publicly owned land in census towns with populations of more than 10,000.

The register covers land owned by government departments, local authorities and a range of commercial and non-commercial State bodies. It is intended to support strategic land management, housing planning and the identification of under-utilised land.

The LDA's first Report on Relevant Public Land, published in 2023, identified 83 State-owned sites which it estimated had long-term potential for as many as 67,000 homes.

A second report in 2025 assessed 102 parcels across 55 census towns. Depending on development constraints and assumptions, the sites were assessed as having potential for approximately 10,860 to 70,830 homes.

== Funding ==
The LDA was launched in 2018 with planned capitalisation of €1.25 billion.

As its housing-delivery role expanded, the Government substantially increased its available capital. In December 2023, the Government approved arrangements which provided for funding commitments of approximately €5 billion, including additional investment through the Ireland Strategic Investment Fund.

Under the Government's housing plan announced in 2025, a further €2.5 billion was allocated, bringing the LDA's total capital capacity to approximately €8.75 billion. The Government stated that the additional resources were intended to support delivery of about 14,000 homes under the agency's then-current business plan.

By June 2026, the LDA reported group assets of just over €2.9 billion and projected capital expenditure of approximately €1.5 billion for the year.

== Governance ==
The statutory LDA is structured as a designated activity company. Its board is chaired by Cormac O'Rourke, who became chair when the statutory company was incorporated in March 2022. John Coleman has served as chief executive since the organisation's establishment.

The agency is subject to the Freedom of Information Act 2014, audit by the Comptroller and Auditor General and a statutory auditor, and oversight by the Oireachtas Committee of Public Accounts.

Its headquarters are at George's Court on Townsend Street in Dublin.

== Criticism and political debate ==
=== Public land and local government ===
The legislation placing the LDA on a statutory basis generated debate over the use of publicly owned land and the role of elected local authorities.

During consideration of the Land Development Agency Bill in 2021, opposition politicians and a majority of Dublin City Council councillors criticised provisions allowing greater central-government involvement in decisions concerning local-authority land. Critics argued that the legislation could weaken local democratic control and permit public land to be developed with excessive involvement from private developers.

The Government argued that the LDA was intended to supplement rather than replace local authorities and that a dedicated national body was necessary to develop large and complex sites and increase social and affordable housing output.

The final legislation incorporated affordability requirements for residential development on relevant public land.

=== Pace of delivery ===
The agency was also criticised during its early years for the pace at which housing was delivered. In 2023, five years after the LDA's launch, The Irish Times noted that delivery remained well below the 150,000-home, 20-year ambition announced by Government in 2018 and that the agency had faced delays while awaiting its statutory framework and progressing sites through planning and infrastructure processes.

Housing output increased later in the decade. By July 2026 the agency said it had delivered 3,215 homes, had 6,500 under construction and expected to complete at least another 13,000 between mid-2026 and the end of 2030.

=== Trade-union recognition ===
In May 2025, Fórsa accused the LDA of refusing to recognise the union formally or allow its representatives access to the workplace to meet members. Fórsa national secretary Katie Morgan argued that the position was inappropriate for a publicly funded State body.

The LDA responded that it respected employees' legal right to join a trade union but had declined to enter an exclusive recognition agreement requested by Fórsa, stating that no such agreement was legally required and that it preferred to maintain direct engagement with staff.

== See also ==
- Homelessness in Ireland
- Cost rental
- National Asset Management Agency
- Housing Agency
- Department of Housing, Local Government and Heritage
