= Housing Finance Agency =

Irish state housing-finance company

Housing Finance Agency plc
- Type: State-owned company
- Industry: Housing finance
- Founded: 8 February 1982; 44 years ago
- Area served: Ireland
- Key people: Frank Allen (chairperson); Deirdre Collier (chief executive)
- Owner: Government of Ireland
- Parent: Department of Housing, Local Government and Heritage
- Website: www.hfa.ie

The Housing Finance Agency (HFA) is an Irish State-owned company which provides long-term finance for social, affordable and student housing and other housing-related purposes. It lends primarily to local authorities, Approved Housing Bodies (AHBs) and higher-education institutions.

The agency was provided for by the Housing Finance Agency Act 1981 and incorporated on 8 February 1982. It operates under the aegis of the Department of Housing, Local Government and Heritage, while its shares are held on behalf of the State by the Minister responsible for public expenditure.

Originally created principally to finance house-purchase loans for households which had difficulty obtaining commercial mortgages, the HFA later developed into a wholesale public-sector lender. Its remit now includes funding social and cost-rental housing delivered by local authorities and AHBs, local-authority mortgage schemes, and purpose-built student accommodation.

At the end of 2024 the HFA had a loan book of approximately €8.6 billion. During that year it advanced €1.46 billion in loans and reported that its financing had supported the completion of 4,525 new homes.

== History ==
=== Establishment ===
The Housing Finance Agency Bill was introduced in 1981 against a background of high mortgage interest rates and restricted access to housing finance for households unable to satisfy the lending criteria of commercial banks and building societies.

The legislation provided for the establishment of a limited company whose principal functions would include making house-purchase loans, supplying funds to housing authorities so that they could make such loans, and raising finance for those purposes. The agency's initial statutory borrowing ceiling was £200 million.

The Housing Finance Agency Act 1981 was enacted on 27 December 1981 and required the Minister for the Environment to establish the agency as a company under the Companies Acts. The company commenced operations on 8 February 1982.

Its nominal share capital under the original legislation was £100, divided into 100 £1 shares.

=== House-purchase lending in the 1980s ===
During its early years the HFA's principal activity was the financing of mortgages for owner-occupiers, either directly or through local authorities.

The scheme was aimed particularly at households on modest incomes who could not obtain sufficient mortgage finance from conventional lenders. In 1983 the Minister for the Environment described the agency and local-authority lending schemes as important sources of finance for people in lower-income groups who would not normally be served by commercial mortgage institutions.

The agency funded its early lending partly through long-term index-linked bonds. The Housing Finance Agency (Amendment) Act 1982 clarified its power to issue securities whose redemption value was linked to the Consumer Price Index and provided for the State guarantee to apply to increases in their value.

By 1984 the agency had provided approximately 11,000 house-purchase loans with a value of £217 million. A 1986 Oireachtas committee report concluded that long-term index-linked borrowing was an appropriate means of financing what were effectively 30-year mortgages.

In 1985 the State planned to provide £86 million through the HFA to finance approximately 4,185 house-purchase loans.

Some of the early index-linked mortgage arrangements later attracted criticism because borrowers could see the nominal capital balance of their loans increase with inflation. Their experience was still being cited as a concern during debates over later shared-ownership housing schemes in the early 1990s.

=== Restructuring and shift to wholesale finance ===
The agency was restructured in 1986 and ceased making new direct loans to individual members of the public. Its role increasingly became one of raising finance centrally and lending it onward through local authorities and other housing providers.

When the Housing (Miscellaneous Provisions) Bill 1992 was introduced, the Government stated that the HFA had not engaged in direct public lending since its 1986 restructuring. The legislation therefore removed that function while expanding its ability to finance the full range of local-authority housing functions.

The same reforms increased the HFA's statutory borrowing limit from £1 billion to £1.5 billion and enabled it to support programmes including shared ownership and the acquisition and development of land for housing.

The agency subsequently financed local-authority mortgage products and social-housing schemes, including the Capital Loan and Subsidy Scheme (CLSS). Under the CLSS, which operated from 1991 to 2009, local authorities borrowed from the HFA to provide capital finance to voluntary housing bodies. Approximately 10,200 homes were ultimately delivered under the scheme.

== Approved Housing Bodies ==
The role of Approved Housing Bodies became an increasingly important part of the HFA's business, particularly following the financial crisis and the expansion of non-profit social-housing delivery.

Section 17 of the Housing (Miscellaneous Provisions) Act 2002 enabled the HFA to lend directly to qualifying voluntary housing organisations and co-operative housing societies.

Housing organisations seeking direct HFA finance are subject to financial and governance assessment. Larger qualifying organisations may receive Certified Body status, after which individual projects are considered for lending.

Direct lending to AHBs increased significantly during the 2010s. In 2016, HFA approvals to the sector reached €260 million for schemes providing 1,740 homes, compared with €116 million in approvals the previous year.

By 2018 the agency had approved €615 million of AHB social-housing finance for 3,292 homes. The HFA stated that it had approved approximately €1.28 billion for 7,958 AHB homes since beginning its modern programme of direct AHB lending in late 2011.

AHB lending later became the dominant area of new HFA activity. In 2024 the agency advanced approximately €1.3 billion to AHBs, and HFA-backed organisations completed 4,525 homes.

In the first half of 2025 the agency advanced €709 million in new loans, including €682 million to AHBs. It approved lending intended to support 1,807 social homes and 962 cost-rental homes.

== Cost-rental and affordable housing ==
The HFA became an important source of long-term finance for Ireland's developing cost-rental sector, in which rents are based broadly on the cost of financing, constructing and managing accommodation rather than prevailing private-market rents.

The State's first cost-rental programme for Approved Housing Bodies was announced in 2021. Initial projects involved Clúid, Respond and Tuath Housing and were intended to provide hundreds of homes at rents at least 25 per cent below comparable market rates.

Long-term fixed-rate HFA finance subsequently became a significant element of the cost-rental funding model. In 2025 the HFA and European Investment Bank announced a further €400 million funding facility designed to support social and affordable housing and allow the HFA to provide qualifying borrowers with fixed-rate finance for terms of up to 40 years.

== Local-authority home loans ==
Although the HFA no longer lends mortgages directly to households, it has continued to finance mortgage schemes administered by local authorities.

These have included shared-ownership arrangements, affordable-loan schemes and, from 2018, the Rebuilding Ireland Home Loan, subsequently replaced by the Local Authority Home Loan. Such schemes provide mortgages to creditworthy households which cannot obtain sufficient finance from commercial mortgage lenders.

The HFA initially borrowed €200 million to fund the Rebuilding Ireland Home Loan. Demand for the scheme subsequently exceeded early expectations, leading to debate over the availability and monitoring of funding.

== Student accommodation ==
The agency's remit was expanded by section 51 of the Planning and Development (Housing) and Residential Tenancies Act 2016 to permit lending to higher-education institutions for student accommodation.

The HFA began lending to universities in 2018. During that year it sanctioned €135 million for the construction of 1,173 student bedrooms.

In 2021 the Council of Europe Development Bank agreed a €75 million facility with the HFA to support the construction of university student accommodation.

A further initiative agreed with the European Investment Bank in 2023 provided for a €434 million programme, including a €200 million EIB loan, intended to support at least 2,700 additional student beds.

By the end of 2024 five universities had received HFA loan approvals totalling approximately €256 million for 2,218 student bedrooms.

== Funding and borrowing ==
The HFA is designed to be self-financing. It does not ordinarily receive an Exchequer subvention for its operating costs, instead adding a margin to its cost of borrowing sufficient to cover administration and financial risk.

Its funds have been raised from several sources, including:

- the National Treasury Management Agency (NTMA);
- the European Investment Bank (EIB);
- the Council of Europe Development Bank (CEB); and
- historically, domestic and international capital markets.

Borrowings by the HFA may be guaranteed by the Minister for Finance under the 1981 Act.

The EIB has provided a series of framework loans to the agency for social and affordable housing. A €200 million facility was signed in 2019, another €200 million in 2021, and a €400 million facility in December 2024 intended to contribute to the financing of approximately 2,900 homes.

The agency's statutory borrowing ceiling has been increased repeatedly as its role has expanded. Government approved an increase from €10 billion to €12 billion in 2023.

The Housing Finance Agency (Amendment) Act 2025 increased the statutory borrowing limit again, from €12 billion to €13.5 billion. The Oireachtas was told that the additional borrowing capacity could facilitate finance for an estimated 5,650 additional homes.

By November 2025 its funding limit under the NTMA Guaranteed Notes Programme had increased from €5 billion in 2020 to €12.2 billion.

== Role under Housing for All ==
Under the Government's Housing for All strategy, the HFA became one of the principal public financing channels for new social and affordable housing.

In 2022 the Government said the agency was expected to lend approximately €5 billion into housing over the lifetime of the strategy, representing about one quarter of the investment then envisaged under the plan.

For 2024 the Government's housing capital programme anticipated approximately €1.5 billion of HFA investment alongside Exchequer and Land Development Agency expenditure.

The Government stated in November 2025 that HFA funding had supported more than 27,400 social and affordable homes since the agency's establishment and projected approximately €2 billion of HFA investment during 2026.

== Governance ==
The HFA is incorporated as a public limited company but is wholly State owned. Its board is appointed by the Minister for Housing, Local Government and Heritage with the consent of the minister responsible for public expenditure.

The board includes representatives with experience in local government, housing, public administration and finance. Frank Allen has served as chairperson since 2022.

Deirdre Collier was appointed chief executive in October 2024, succeeding Barry O'Leary, who had led the agency for more than a decade. Collier had previously been chief financial officer of Clúid Housing and had held senior banking positions at KBC Bank Ireland and Ulster Bank.

The agency is subject to the Code of Practice for the Governance of State Bodies, freedom-of-information legislation, and public-sector accountability requirements.

Its annual financial statements are audited and presented to the Oireachtas through the Department of Housing, Local Government and Heritage.

== See also ==
- Department of Housing, Local Government and Heritage
- Land Development Agency
- Approved Housing Bodies
- National Treasury Management Agency
