= Thomas Lawlor (politician) =

Irish politician and trade unionist (died 1945)

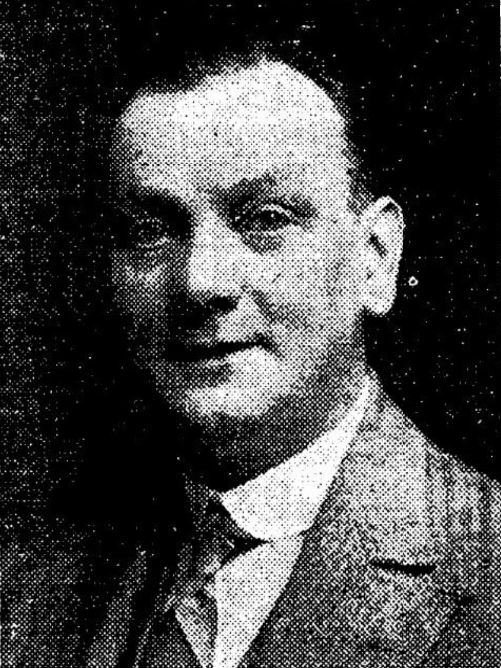
- Lawlor in 1937

Teachta Dála
- In office July 1937 – June 1938
- In office June 1927 – September 1927
- Constituency: Dublin South

Personal details
- Born: Dublin, Ireland
- Died: 29 October 1945 Dublin, Ireland
- Party: Labour Party

Thomas Lawlor (died 29 October 1945) was an Irish Labour Party politician and trade union official.

In 1925 the Labour Party identified high taxation as a government weakness and decided to contest the Dublin South and Dublin North by-elections. Lawlor, as general secretary of the Irish Municipal Employees' Trade Union was the candidate in Dublin South, with Denis Cullen of the Irish Bakers Union running in Dublin North. Neither of them were elected.

Lawlor was first elected to Dáil Éireann as a Labour Party Teachta Dála (TD) for the Dublin South constituency at the June 1927 general election. He lost his seat at the September 1927 general election. He was an unsuccessful candidate at the 1932 general election but re-gained his seat at the 1937 general election. He lost his seat again at the 1938 general election.

At the 1943 general election he was an unsuccessful independent candidate in the Carlow–Kilkenny constituency.

Trade union offices
| Preceded by Dan Magee | General Secretary of the Irish Municipal Employees' Trade Union; 1920–1939 | Succeeded by Frank Foley |

| Dáil | Election | Deputy (Party) | Deputy (Party) | Deputy (Party) | Deputy (Party) | Deputy (Party) | Deputy (Party) | Deputy (Party) |
|---|---|---|---|---|---|---|---|---|
| 2nd | 1921 | Thomas Kelly (SF) | Daniel McCarthy (SF) | Constance Markievicz (SF) | Cathal Ó Murchadha (SF) | 4 seats 1921–1923 | | |
| 3rd | 1922 | Thomas Kelly (PT-SF) | Daniel McCarthy (PT-SF) | William O'Brien (Lab) | Myles Keogh (Ind.) | 4 seats 1921–1923 | | |
| 4th | 1923 | Philip Cosgrave (CnaG) | Daniel McCarthy (CnaG) | Constance Markievicz (Rep) | Myles Keogh (Ind.) | Cathal Ó Murchadha (Rep) | Michael Hayes (CnaG) | Peadar Doyle (CnaG) |
| 4th | 1923 by-election | Philip Cosgrave (CnaG) | Daniel McCarthy (CnaG) | Constance Markievicz (Rep) | Myles Keogh (Ind.) | Cathal Ó Murchadha (Rep) | Hugh Kennedy (CnaG) | Peadar Doyle (CnaG) |
| 4th | March 1924 by-election | James O'Mara (CnaG) | Daniel McCarthy (CnaG) | Constance Markievicz (Rep) | Myles Keogh (Ind.) | Cathal Ó Murchadha (Rep) | Hugh Kennedy (CnaG) | Peadar Doyle (CnaG) |
| 4th | November 1924 by-election | James O'Mara (CnaG) | Daniel McCarthy (CnaG) | Constance Markievicz (Rep) | Myles Keogh (Ind.) | Cathal Ó Murchadha (Rep) | Seán Lemass (SF) | Peadar Doyle (CnaG) |
| 4th | 1925 by-election | James O'Mara (CnaG) | Thomas Hennessy (CnaG) | Constance Markievicz (Rep) | Myles Keogh (Ind.) | Cathal Ó Murchadha (Rep) | Seán Lemass (SF) | Peadar Doyle (CnaG) |
| 5th | 1927 (Jun) | James Beckett (CnaG) | Vincent Rice (NL) | Constance Markievicz (FF) | Myles Keogh (Ind.) | Thomas Lawlor (Lab) | Seán Lemass (FF) | Peadar Doyle (CnaG) |
| 5th | 1927 by-election | James Beckett (CnaG) | Vincent Rice (NL) | Thomas Hennessy (CnaG) | Myles Keogh (Ind.) | Thomas Lawlor (Lab) | Seán Lemass (FF) | Peadar Doyle (CnaG) |
| 6th | 1927 (Sep) | James Beckett (CnaG) | Robert Briscoe (FF) | Thomas Hennessy (CnaG) | Myles Keogh (CnaG) | Frank Kerlin (FF) | Seán Lemass (FF) | Peadar Doyle (CnaG) |
| 7th | 1932 | James Beckett (CnaG) | Robert Briscoe (FF) | Thomas Hennessy (CnaG) | Myles Keogh (CnaG) | James Lynch (FF) | Seán Lemass (FF) | Peadar Doyle (CnaG) |
| 8th | 1933 | James Beckett (CnaG) | Robert Briscoe (FF) | James McGuire (CnaG) | Thomas Kelly (FF) | James Lynch (FF) | Seán Lemass (FF) | Peadar Doyle (CnaG) |
| 9th | 1937 | Myles Keogh (FG) | Robert Briscoe (FF) | Thomas Lawlor (Lab) | Thomas Kelly (FF) | Joseph Hannigan (Ind.) | Seán Lemass (FF) | Peadar Doyle (FG) |
| 10th | 1938 | James Beckett (FG) | Robert Briscoe (FF) | James Lynch (FF) | Thomas Kelly (FF) | Joseph Hannigan (Ind.) | Seán Lemass (FF) | Peadar Doyle (FG) |
| 10th | 1939 by-election | John McCann (FF) | Robert Briscoe (FF) | James Lynch (FF) | Thomas Kelly (FF) | Joseph Hannigan (Ind.) | Seán Lemass (FF) | Peadar Doyle (FG) |
| 11th | 1943 | Maurice Dockrell (FG) | Robert Briscoe (FF) | James Lynch (FF) | James Larkin Jnr (Lab) | John McCann (FF) | Seán Lemass (FF) | Peadar Doyle (FG) |
| 12th | 1944 | Maurice Dockrell (FG) | Robert Briscoe (FF) | James Lynch (FF) | James Larkin Jnr (Lab) | John McCann (FF) | Seán Lemass (FF) | Peadar Doyle (FG) |
| 13th | 1948 | Constituency abolished. See Dublin South-Central, Dublin South-East and Dublin South-West. | | | | | | |

| Dáil | Election | Deputy (Party) | Deputy (Party) | Deputy (Party) | Deputy (Party) | Deputy (Party) |
|---|---|---|---|---|---|---|
| 22nd | 1981 | Niall Andrews (FF) | Séamus Brennan (FF) | Nuala Fennell (FG) | John Kelly (FG) | Alan Shatter (FG) |
| 23rd | 1982 (Feb) | Niall Andrews (FF) | Séamus Brennan (FF) | Nuala Fennell (FG) | John Kelly (FG) | Alan Shatter (FG) |
| 24th | 1982 (Nov) | Niall Andrews (FF) | Séamus Brennan (FF) | Nuala Fennell (FG) | John Kelly (FG) | Alan Shatter (FG) |
| 25th | 1987 | Tom Kitt (FF) | Séamus Brennan (FF) | Anne Colley (PDs) | John Kelly (FG) | Alan Shatter (FG) |
| 26th | 1989 | Tom Kitt (FF) | Séamus Brennan (FF) | Nuala Fennell (FG) | Roger Garland (GP) | Alan Shatter (FG) |
| 27th | 1992 | Tom Kitt (FF) | Séamus Brennan (FF) | Liz O'Donnell (PDs) | Eithne FitzGerald (Lab) | Alan Shatter (FG) |
| 28th | 1997 | Tom Kitt (FF) | Séamus Brennan (FF) | Liz O'Donnell (PDs) | Olivia Mitchell (FG) | Alan Shatter (FG) |
| 29th | 2002 | Tom Kitt (FF) | Séamus Brennan (FF) | Liz O'Donnell (PDs) | Olivia Mitchell (FG) | Eamon Ryan (GP) |
| 30th | 2007 | Tom Kitt (FF) | Séamus Brennan (FF) | Alan Shatter (FG) | Olivia Mitchell (FG) | Eamon Ryan (GP) |
| 30th | 2009 by-election | Tom Kitt (FF) | George Lee (FG) | Alan Shatter (FG) | Olivia Mitchell (FG) | Eamon Ryan (GP) |
| 31st | 2011 | Shane Ross (Ind.) | Peter Mathews (FG) | Alan Shatter (FG) | Olivia Mitchell (FG) | Alex White (Lab) |
| 32nd | 2016 | Constituency abolished. See Dublin Rathdown, Dublin South-West and Dún Laoghaire. | | | | |
