= Mortgage to Rent =

Mortgage to Rent is part of the Home Owners' Support Fund, run by the Scottish Government. It is used by homeowners who are threatened with eviction due to non-payment of their mortgages.

Under the scheme, a homeowner's property is bought by a housing association, which then rents the property back to the owner, who is able to stay on as a social tenant.

== Qualification ==
To qualify, the homeowner needs to have:

- legal action threatened
- proof of primary residence
- no inhibition contract against sale of the property
- consent of all property owners (e.g., both husband and wife)

== Mortgage shortfall ==
Many people find themselves being asked to pay large sums by their mortgage lender after being repossessed or handing in their house keys. Often people think that once they have left the house, their liability ends. However, this is not the case if the house is sold for less than the outstanding mortgage. The remaining debt is usually referred to as a mortgage shortfall.
