= Fórsa =

Irish trade union

- Predecessor: CPSU; IMPACT; PSEU
- Founded: 1 January 2018
- Headquarters: Nerney's Ct, Rotunda, Dublin 1
- Location: Ireland
- Members: 89,000
- Affiliations: ICTU
- Website: forsa.ie

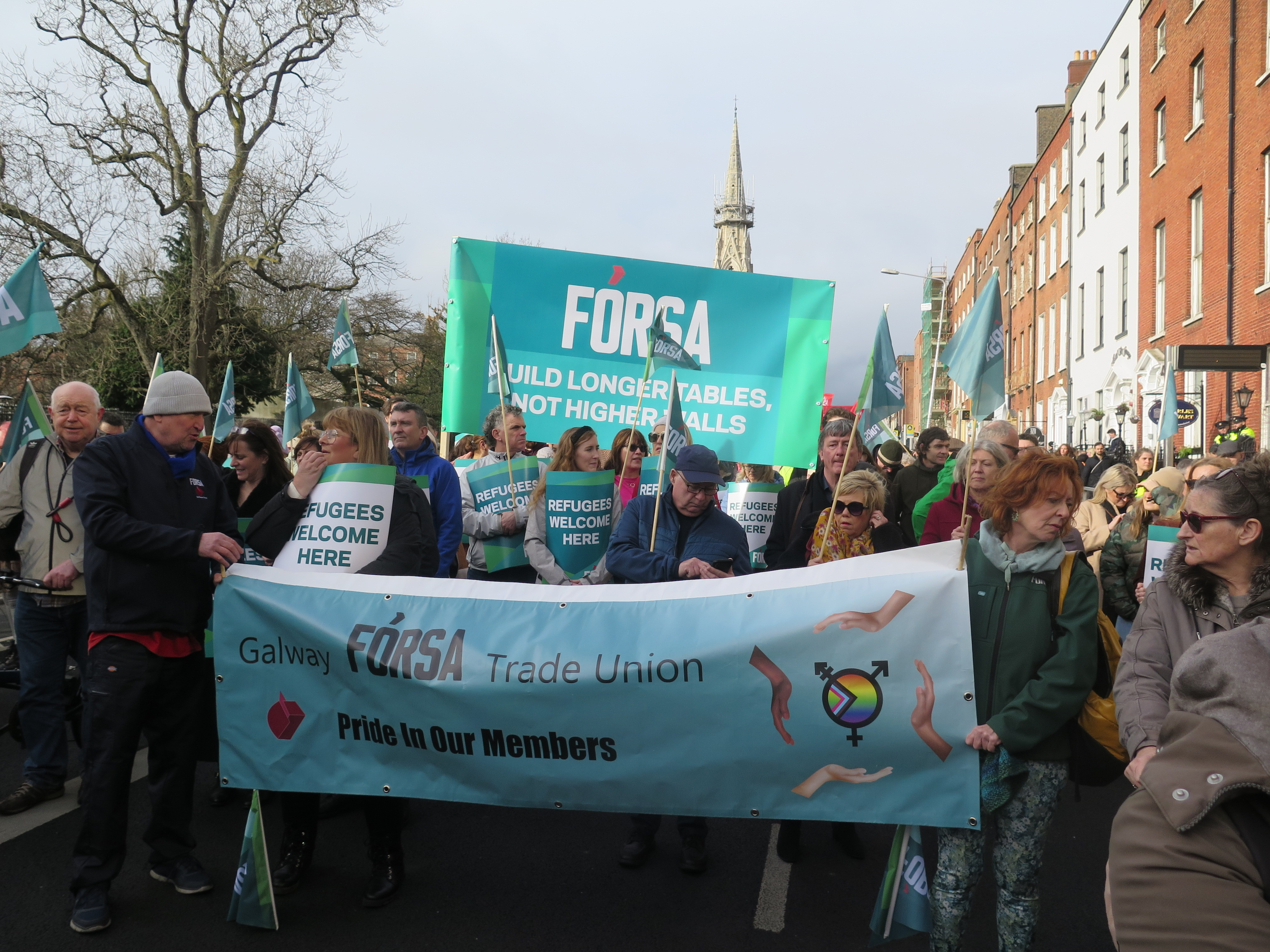
Members of Fórsa marching in 2023

Fórsa (pronounced [ˈfˠoːɾˠsˠə]; "Force") is an Irish trade union for public service staff. With over 89,000 members, it is the largest public service union in Ireland, and second largest trade union in the state. It was created following a ballot of the Public Service Executive Union (PSEU), the Irish Municipal, Public and Civil Trade Union (IMPACT) and the Civil and Public Services Union (CPSU) in November 2017, where the majority of each union voted to amalgamate.

== Union Composition ==
The union represents hundreds of different grades, professions, and occupations covering about 30,000 civil servants, 30,000 health workers, 12,000 education staff, 10,000 local authority workers, and 6,500 people in semi-state organisations and private companies. It contains six autonomous divisions, called:

1. The Civil Service Division
2. Health & Welfare
3. Local Government
4. Education
5. Municipal Employees
6. Services and Enterprises (semi and commercial semi-state agencies and companies and private sector employment)

Each division's representatives have a biennial conference where it decides its policy regarding that division. On alternate years there is a National conference for the entire union that decides on policy issues for the entire union. The union is governed by a national executive, made up of elected representatives from each of the divisions. Each division is represented on the National Executive in a manner broadly proportionate to the membership strength of each division.

Division	Representatives
Civil Service Division	6
Health & Welfare Division	6
Local Government Division	3
Education Division	3
Municipal Employees Division	2
Services and Enterprises Division	3

The organization has a combined staff of 120 (67 officials and 53 administration). The three outgoing General secretaries of the predecessor unions, Tom Geragthy (PSEU), Eoin Ronayne (CPSU) and Shay Cody (IMPACT) are the initial general secretaries for Fórsa, but following the transfer of Geragthy to the Labour Court, and the retirement of Shay Cody, Eoin Ronayne opted to change his title to "Deputy General secretary" to bring clarity to the structure following the appointment the new union head. Kevin Callinan.

The union has a combined income of more than €20m a year and estimated assets of more than €80m, of which more than €50m will be held in a fund for use in disputes with employers and legal cases.

== Background ==
Talks on forming the new union were sparked by a 2011 report of the commission on the Trade Union Movement, which was set up by the Irish Congress of Trade Unions to look at the way public service unions were organised. There were 19 unions operating across the public sector at the time. The commission recommended that unions affiliated to the ICTU that were working in common areas should collaborate more closely and explore possible mergers, so they could serve their members better and have more impact.

== Reaction ==
In response to the amalgamation, Ged Nash, the Spokesperson on Employment and Social Protection for the Labour Party said "The decision by IMPACT, CPSU and PSEU to amalgamate into one union, Fórsa, is a positive move for public sector workers and for the trade union movement generally." Patricia King, general secretary of the Irish Congress of Trade Unions described the merger as "a hugely significant and positive step forward for the trade union movement."

== Issues ==
=== Ryanair ===
In late 2017, the large airline company, Ryanair, which was founded in Ireland announced that for the first time it would recognise Trade unions. In Ireland, Ryanair is negotiating with Fórsa and its Irish Airline Pilots' Association (Ialpa) branch. Ryanair executives and Forsa met for the first time in late 2017, and again in January 2018, aiming to thrash out a "historical negotiating framework" that will later lead to talks on pilot pay and working conditions. Initial talks were described by the union as being "constructive" and that the two sides exchanged views on how a final agreement should look.

On 9 January, in a letter to all Ryanair pilots employed in Dublin, chief commercial pilot officer Peter Bellew offered pilots at the base a new agreement which he said could secure them pay increases of up to 20%. Pilots in Dublin had rejected an earlier deal as part of a dispute over conditions at the airline. One key issue was the refusal to recognise unions to negotiate collectively on behalf of workers. Fórsa had initially agreed to ballot the pilots, but a spokesperson described the Ryanair offer as an "interim measure" pending engagement on pay following completion of a union recognition agreement, stating "the union has convened meetings with its members in Ryanair, and Fórsa has told management we will ballot on a no-strings pay package as an interim measure, pending engagement on pay following completion of a recognition agreement." The union further emphasized that all future pay agreements should go through it, adding "as Fórsa is now recognised by the company for collective bargaining, pay must be negotiated with the union".

However, in February, Ryanair by-passed the union and sent an offer to individual pilots asking them to sign up to the deal which would run until 2022, a package that explicitly freezes any further pay discussions with the union, contradicting the proposed recognition of the pilots union. Consequently, the pilots union agreed not to ballot its members.

Fórsa says it wants to quickly conclude a formal recognition agreement before opening talks with the airline on pay and working conditions. The union has informed Ryanair that it would reconsider putting a package to ballot if it received written assurances that Fórsa was the "sole and exclusive representative body for collective bargaining purposes including pay, terms and conditions" for Ryanair pilots employed in Ireland, assurances that accepting the package would not preclude negotiations with Fórsa on members' pay and conditions, the backdating of pay awards following pay negotiations, or any third-party recommendation being implemented.

However, Ryanair continued to refuse to accept any negotiated settlement with Fórsa. Eventually, in July, Fórsa members finally agreed to actually go strike to protect their rights, the final straw being pilots seeking a basic system covering base allocation and transfer, promotion, the timing of annual leave and other issues determined by length of service. 99% of pilots balloted supported going without pay and committing to an ongoing strike. In response, Ryanair sought to disrupt the union by threatening to fire 300 pilots, a move that Sinn Féin described as "bully-boy tactics" and "shameful". Fórsa described the actions by Ryanair as an "unnecessary decision" adding that it "demonstrates management's unwillingness and/or inability to implement the airline's declared intention to agree working conditions with its staff by negotiating with their chosen trade union representatives... However, the union sees today's announcement as a provocative gesture which is likely to harden pilots’ resolve." Eventually Ryanair relented and went into negotiations with the union, and on 23 August an agreement was reached between both sides.

=== Section 39 Workers ===
Fórsa has approved a campaign of industrial action "to win pay restoration in agencies that are funded by the public health service, but which operate independently of the HSE".

A section 39 agency is an agency that an agency that receives grant funding from the Health Service Executive (HSE) for providing services. Unlike voluntary hospitals and agencies which receive HSE money to deliver services on its behalf (section 38 bodies), staff working in section 39 organisations are not public servants, do not have public service pensions and are not directly bound by Government pay policy. However, traditionally staff in these agencies were linked to (or paid the same as) public sector staff, and when Public Sector pay cuts were made, these were also applied to section 39 agency staff.

However, staff in these agencies were not awarded the same pay restoration that was agreed with Public Sector staff unions in 2017. In January 2018, Fórsa joined with its sister union SIPTU, and approved a campaign of industrial action. The union said a significant number of agencies have failed to act, even though they have the money to do so – it intends to focus action on those groups.

The Government then, on 30 January, agreed to a proposal to establish a process to deal with pay restoration for Section 39 workers with Fórsa. The agreement involved the Government was establishing a process to find out how many people were affected and much it would cost to resolve the issue. The process would also seek to establish which organisations had received an increased block grant but had not passed on some of that to its workers. However, by July 2018 the Government had still not resolved the issue, and talks between them and Fórsa collapsed. Fórsa balloted its relevant members for a strike on 18 September, which would be alongside colleagues in SIPTU.

=== Driving Tests ===
In February 2018, it was reported that more than 80,000 people were waiting to be tested for their drivers license.

In mid-February, the Dáil approved a Road Traffic Bill that meant that car owners who allow unaccompanied learner drivers to use their vehicles could face prosecution for the first time under new measures approved by Cabinet this week. Fórsa advised that measures in the amended Road Traffic Bill could double demand in the short term, potentially increasing driving-test waiting times up to 55 weeks. The union detailed that 25 extra driver testers should be employed permanently to meet increased demand and for another 100 testers to be hired on temporary contracts if demand surges, as expected, in response to the Road Traffic Bill.

== Leadership ==
=== General Secretaries ===
2018: Shay Cody, Tom Geraghty, and Eoin Ronayne
2019: Kevin Callinan

=== Deputy General Secretaries ===
2018: Kevin Callinan
2019: Eoin Ronayne and Matt Staunton
2022: Éamonn Donnelly and Matt Staunton
2026: Éamonn Donnelly and Katie Morgan
