= Croke Park Agreement =

2010–14 Irish agreement

The Croke Park Agreement, formally known as the "Public Service Agreement 2010–2014", is an agreement between the Irish government and various public sector unions and representative organisations. It is named after Croke Park, a large sporting arena with conference facilities in Dublin, where related negotiations took place.

== Background ==
The Irish government's 2009 emergency budget and 2010 budget imposed pay cuts on a range of public sector workers. A number of strike actions followed.

The agreement, which was formally titled "The Public Service Agreement 2010–2014", was signed on 6 June 2010 by ICTU. Against a background of layoffs and pay cuts in the private sector, the government agreed not to impose public sector layoffs or further public sector pay cuts.

In return the public sector unions agreed to call no industrial action, and to cooperate on wide scale reforms of the public sector aimed at increasing efficiency, flexibility and redeployment and at reducing cost and headcount.

According to the implementation body, as of March 2012, headcount had been reduced by 28,000 and the annual pay bill had been reduced by €3.1 billion. Over 7,000 public servants were reportedly redeployed.

== See also ==
- Post-2008 Irish economic downturn
- 2009 Irish budget
