= Local Government and Public Services Union =

Irish trade union

The Local Government and Public Services Union was a trade union representing workers employed by local government or some state-run bodies in Ireland.

The union was founded in 1919 as the Irish Local Government Officials' Union. By 1971, it had some members outside local government, such as in the Irish Aviation Authority. As a result, it changed its name to the "Local Government and Public Services Union".

In 1991, the union merged with the Union of Professional and Technical Civil Servants and the Irish Municipal Employees Trade Union to form the Irish Municipal, Public and Civil Trade Union.

== General Secretaries ==
1919: Michael Price
1920: Patrick O'Byrne
1921: John P. Keane
1921: Michael Dunne
1926: Leo Henderson
1931: Patrick O'Byrne
1931: Denis Hagerty
1932: Cecil J. Burgess
1939: Nicholas J. Ffrench
1940: Ann Dunne
1941: Archie Heron
1944: Ann Dunne
1947: J. J. O'Donoghue
1959: Ann Dunne
1960: Thomas Reynolds
1962: Ann Dunne
1964: Harold O'Sullivan
1984: Phil Flynn
