= Martin Firrell =

British artist and activist

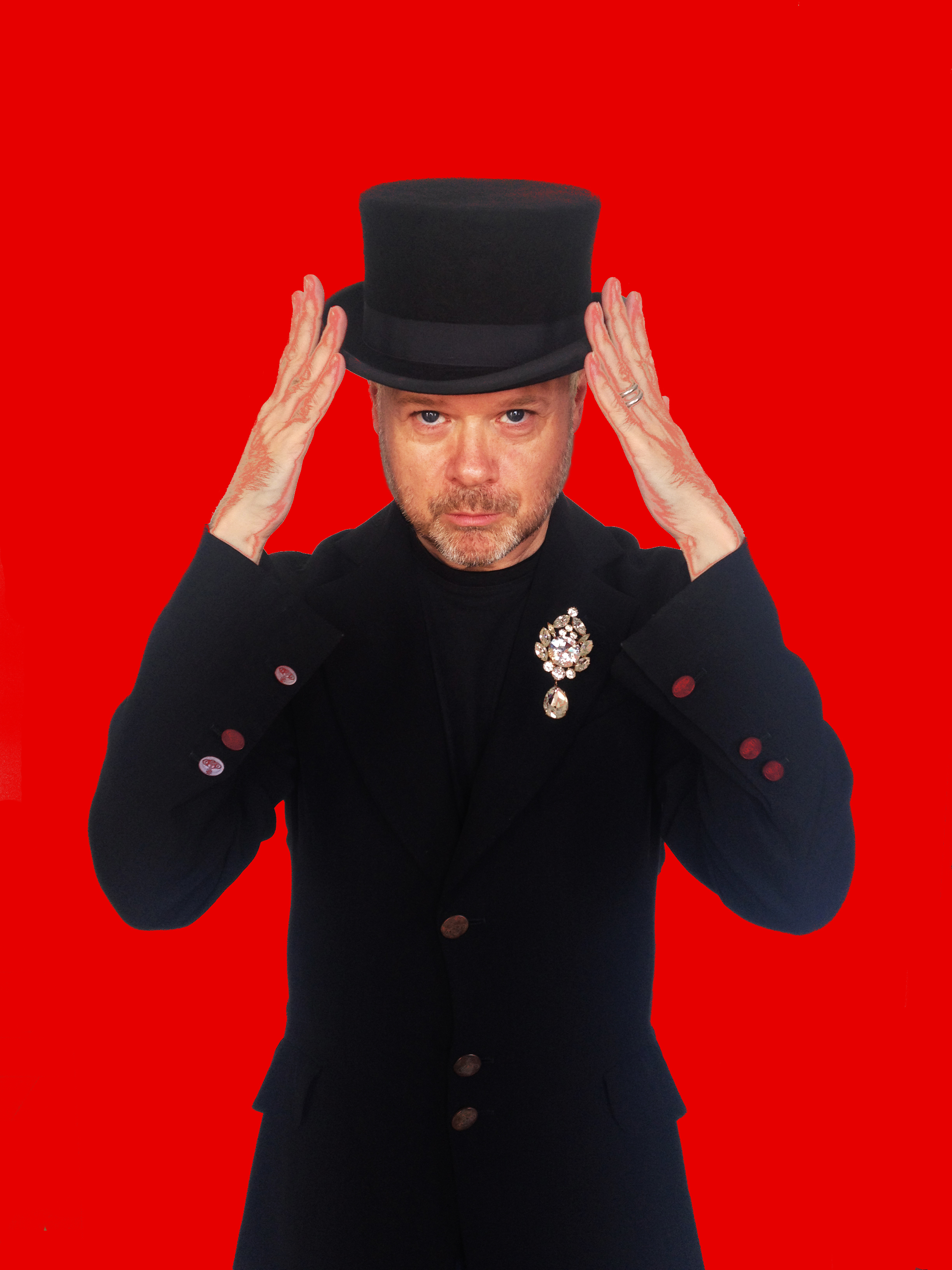
- The Artful Dodger Crossed with an Explosion in a Sequin Factory, self-portrait on red field, 2015
- Born: 4 April 1963 (age 63); Paris, France
- Known for: text-based, socially engaged public artworks on billboards around the world
- Notable work: The Question Mark Inside, St Paul's Cathedral; 4 Tenets for Europe
- Style: political and humanist art
- Movement: Protest Art
- Spouse: William Jackson (2013 – present)
- Patrons: Stevie Spring, Simon Channing Williams, Justin Cochrane
- Website: www.martinfirrell.com see also www.martinfirrellcatalogueraisonne.org

Martin Firrell (born 4 April 1963) is a British public artist. Firrell is known for text-based public artworks on billboards around the world. He uses public art to campaign for greater social equality.

He is one of a trio of artists, with Jenny Holzer and Barbara Kruger, notable for socially engaged public art practice where text is foundational and central to that practice.

His texts address LGBT+ equality, the women's movement, feminism and gender equality; and universal human rights. The artist's aim is "to make the world more humane".

Firrell's billboards often resemble advertising because he redeploys advertising's techniques to achieve artistic-activist ends. Firrell has made more artworks expressly for the billboard medium than any other living artist. This wholesale colonisation of advertising’s oldest and boldest format represents a shift in Fine Art's centre of gravity and makes Firrell a particularly apposite artist for the 21st century. His work has been summarised as "art as debate".

== Early life and education ==
Firrell was born in Paris, France, unexpectedly, on the pavement outside 71 Champs-Élysées. He was educated in the UK, but left school unofficially at 14 because he "had no more use for it". He educated himself during his absence from school by walking and reading in the Norfolk countryside. He read early 20th-century literature and refers to the works of Virginia Woolf and Gertrude Stein, together with the French writer Marguerite Duras (with whom he shares his birthday and a high degree of political sympathy), as important influences on his later development.

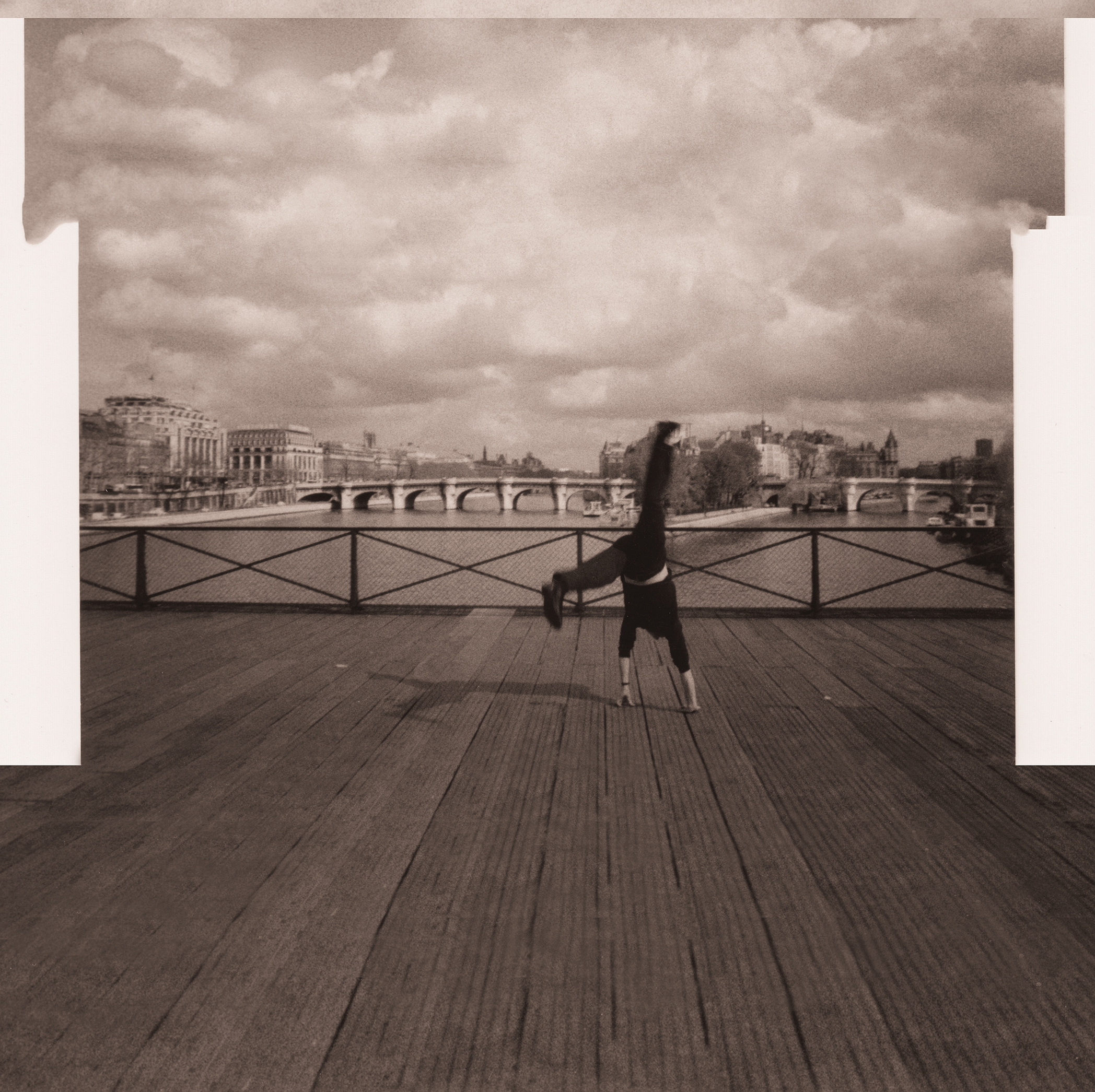
Cartwheel, Pont des Arts Paris, 1998

A passage in Anaïs Nin's novel The Four Chambered Heart set Firrell on the path of socially engaged public works. The novel's protagonist concedes that literature fails to prepare us for, or guide us through, the calamities or challenges of life, and is therefore worthless. "My purpose is to campaign in some way for change, using my works as a medium for catalysing debate. If you can raise debate, eventually change will follow."

Firrell sets out to remedy Nin's "worthlessness" of words by using language to raise questions about society, relevant to the vast majority of people and freely available in public space.

Firrell trained originally as an advertising copywriter and draws on that experience to shape and place in public space slogans like Protest is liberty's ally.

== Formative works ==
Lucid Between Bouts of Sanity is an artist's manifesto written between 1995 and 1996 and distributed at the Literaturnoye Kafe (Saint Petersburg), Russia and the Institute of Contemporary Arts (ICA), The Mall, London UK.

The text is divided into four sections examining the reductive nature of action, the structural flaws inherent in language, the consequent difficulty of meaning anything accurately to anyone, and the possibility of using a constrained and reduced language to find a new expressive accuracy and power. Although brief, the manifesto is a meticulous, structured review of the expressive means available to any artist whose work is to be founded principally on language. "I felt it must be possible to describe the limits within which all language must operate and so designate a clearly defined space for my own experimentation."

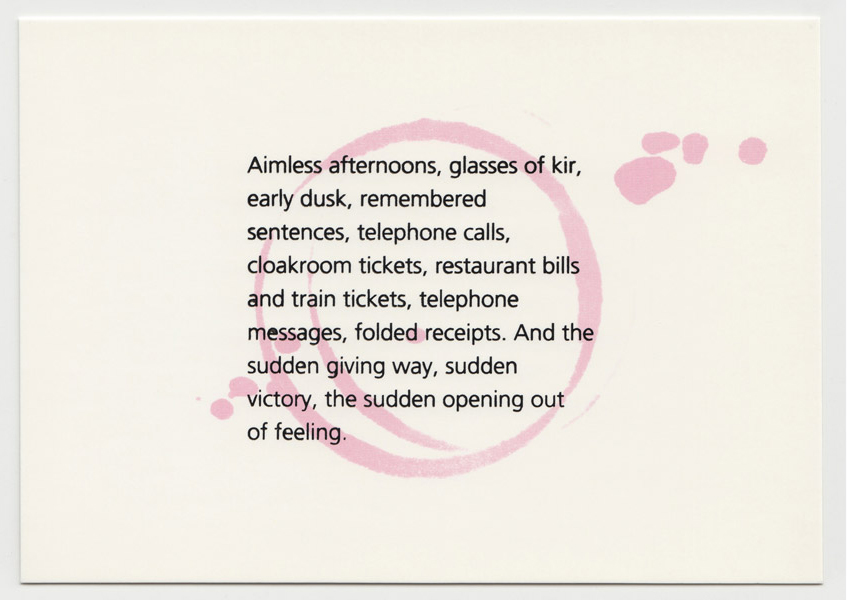
Aimless afternoons, glasses of kir one of 14 postcards from the set Postcards 98, 1998

Firrell turned cartwheels on the Pont des Arts in Paris on 4 April 1998. This early performance work was intended as an expression of the artist's desire to 'upkeel' the world. Cartwheel, Pont des Arts, Paris was the artist's first work conceived expressly for public space. It was photographed by the artist's confidante, concert pianist Yekaterina Lebedeva.

The first of Firrell's graphic works created for public space was a series of 14 postcards, 148mm x 104mm, printed on various stocks. 13 texts are presented where most postcards more usually show a picture, and one postcard carries the photographic image of the artist cartwheeling on the Pont des Arts. The postcard texts, presented on the 'picture' face of each card, were expected to take on a public life of their own as they passed through the postal system. Considered collectively, the postcards explore the possibility of being more deeply implicated in the lives of others or as the artist put it, 'I wanted to ask if it were possible to operate at a level deeper than friendship alone, to find interactions that challenged the conventions of mere sociability and offered new depths of value and meaning.'

In the early part of the 21st Century, Firrell experimented with fly-posting in London's Soho descriptions of love and its subsequent loss. These were the first artworks created by the artist in the poster format, the first to occupy space more usually associated with commercial messaging, and the first works intended as public art. The form and orientation of the posters mimics fly-posting favoured by the music industry. The texts are influenced by the work of French novelist Marguerite Duras. The incidents described are autobiographical. Firrell was appointed London Cultural Ambassador for the now defunct International Herald Tribune curating the newspaper's first London Arts Season in 2005, titled "Breathless…" after Jean-Luc Godard's nouvelle vague film of the same title.

=== 1996-2001 ===
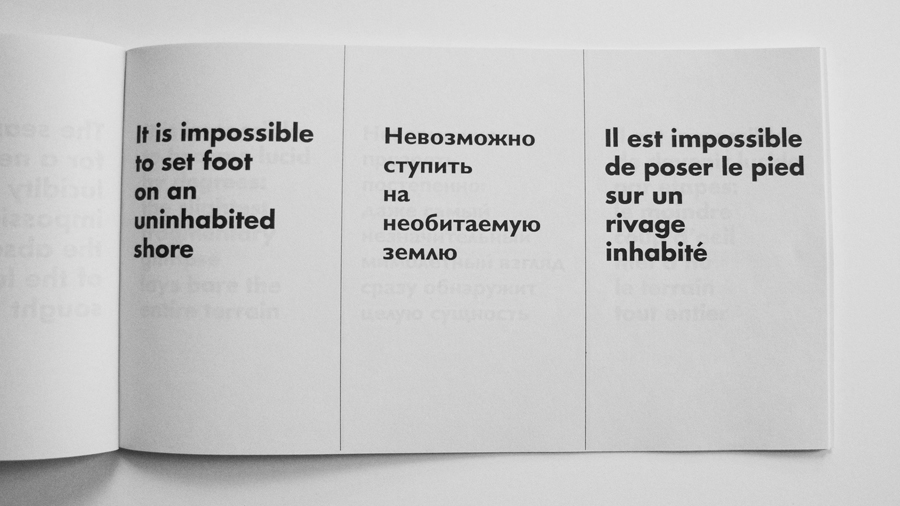
Lucid Between Bouts of Sanity, artist's manifesto, English, Russian, French, published 1996

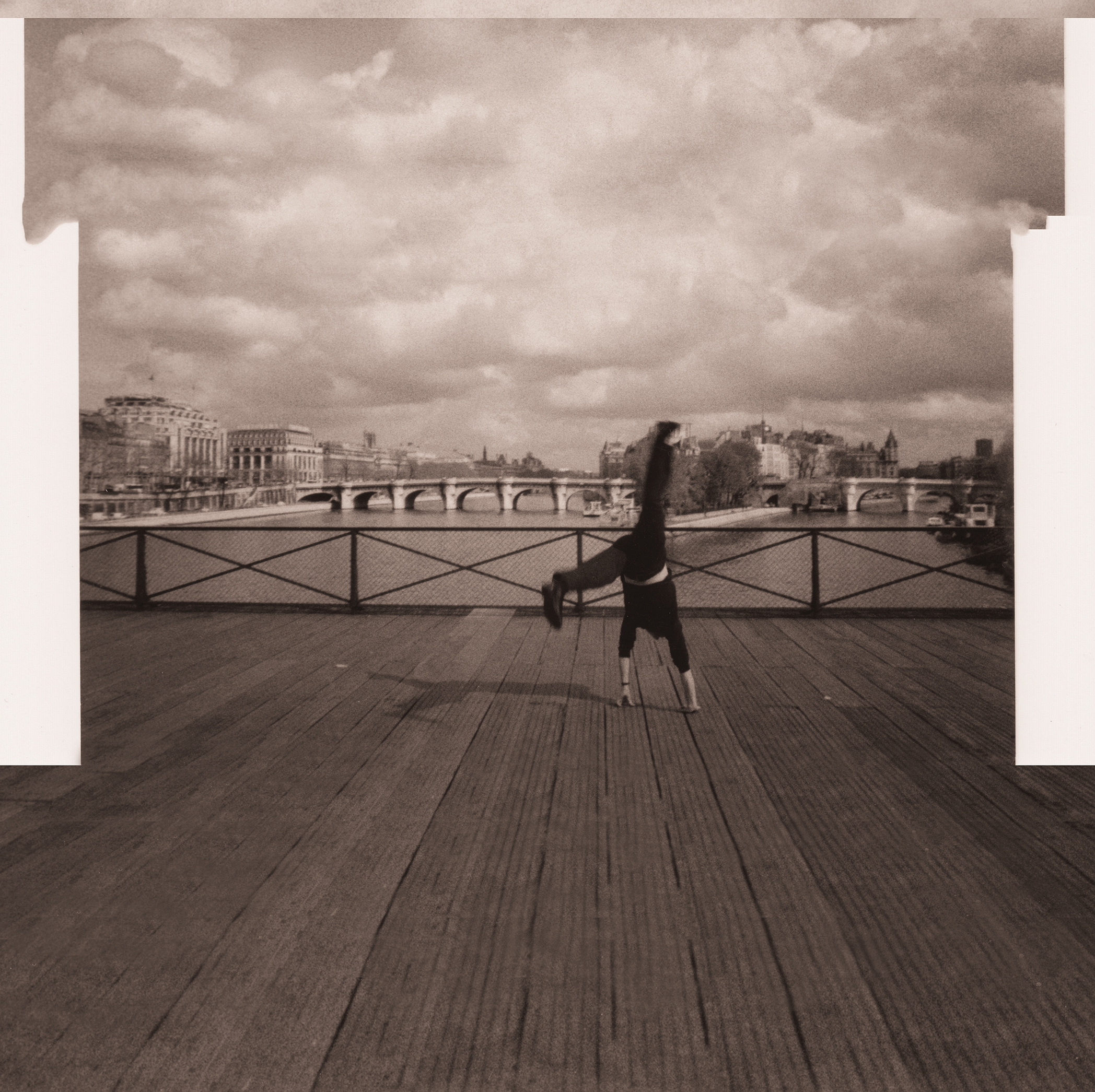
Artist Martin Firrell cartwheels over the Pont des Arts, Paris France, in an early performance work, 1998

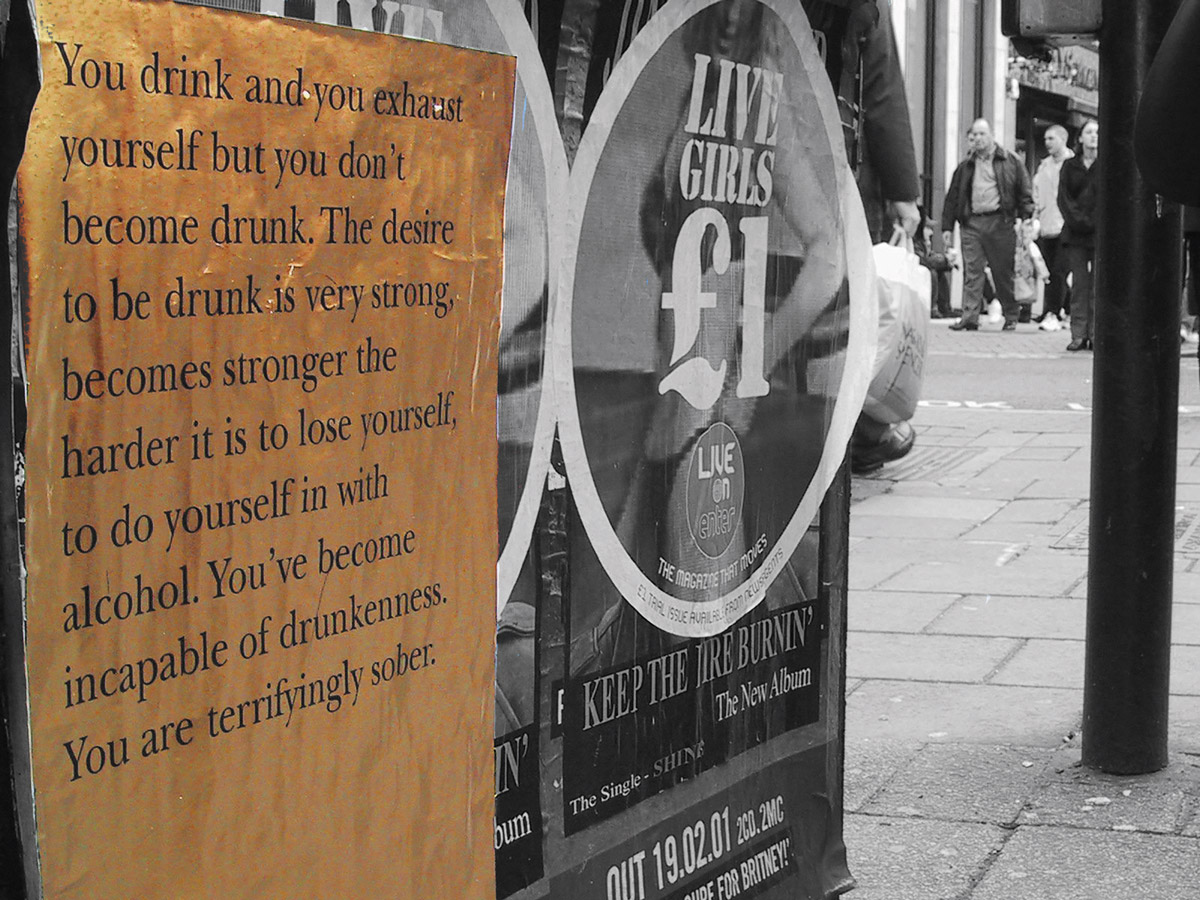
You Drink But You Don't Become Drunk, first artwork in poster form, fly-poster, Soho London UK, 2001

== First billboards ==
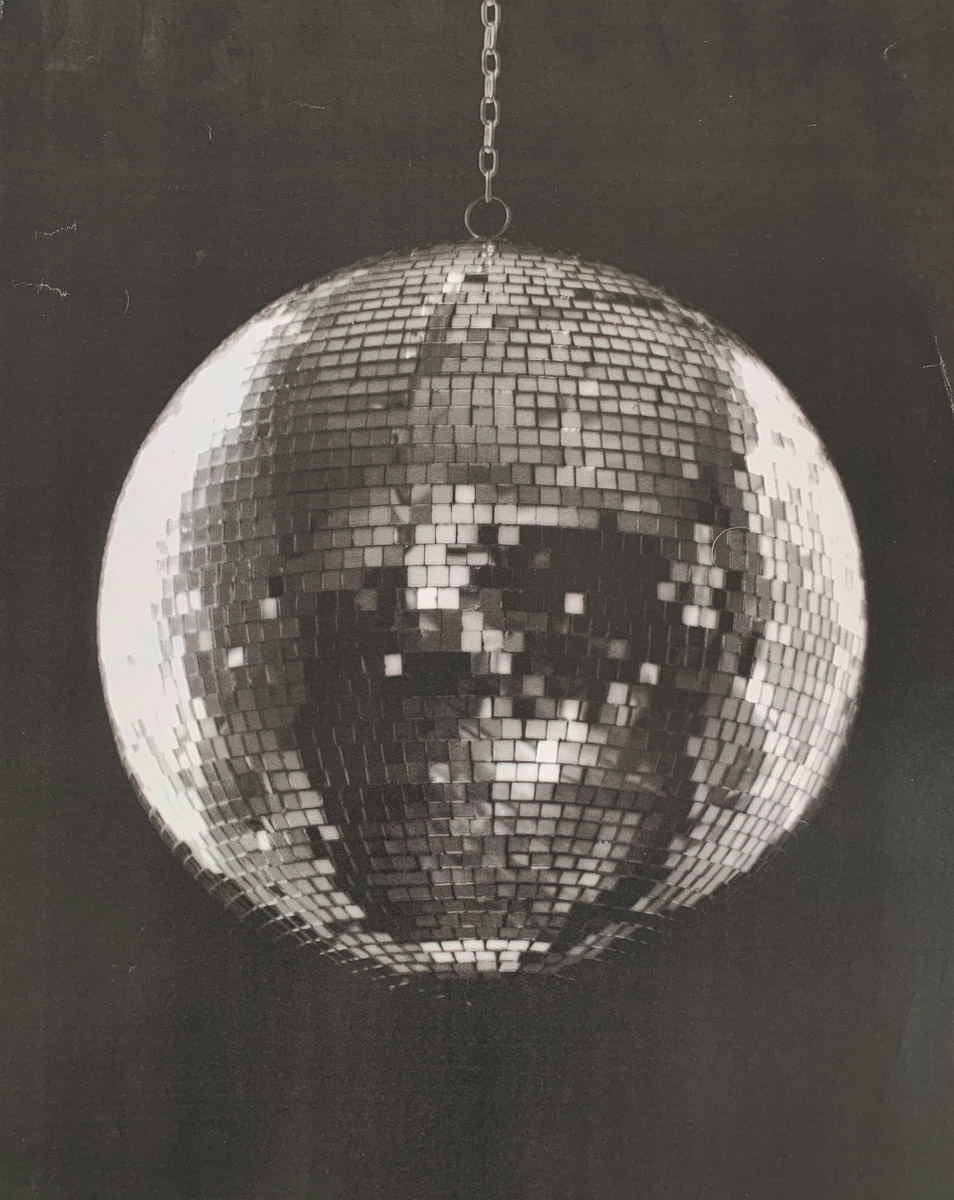
Glitter ball from Celebrate Difference, 2001

Celebrate Difference, was the first work made by the artist for display on a commercial digital billboard, and the first of the artist's works displayed by media owner Clear Channel UK (now Bauer Media Outdoor). The work appeared on one site, an early, experimental installation on the outside of 1 Leicester Square, London WC2H 7NA with a daily audience of 250,000 people. Celebrate Difference is a digital animation of b&w images of the artist, two drag queens embracing, and a glitter ball. Text panels punctuate the images calling for acceptance of, and engagement with, what is 'other'. Both the artist's interest in the subject matter and support from media owner Clear Channel/Bauer Media Outdoor have endured.

Never Fall For Someone with a Body To Diet For appeared on the same digital site, addressing in particular gay culture's emphasis on youth and physical perfection (the site was situated in the main tourist thoroughfare of London's Leicester Square adjacent to the LGBT+ district of Soho). The artwork suggests it is more rewarding to look beyond surface attributes and embrace the embodied, flawed, feeling totality of another human being.

The One Irreducible Truth About Humanity Is Diversity paraphrases the findings of the American researcher into human sexuality, Alfred Kinsey. Kinsey noted that difference in human sexual responses was the one universal constant. Variousness was the only thing that could be said, with any certainty, to apply to all human sexual experience. In paraphrasing Kinsey, the artist implies that ‘normality’ in the human being is variance, and societal pressure to conform to what is considered ‘normal’ is a socially-inflicted and needless hardship. The artwork's text is backed by strong vertical lines which both obscure and reveal the artist's letterforms. These uniform verticals evoke the rigid social structures that were questioned and partly dismantled by Kinsey's research.

=== 2001-2005 ===
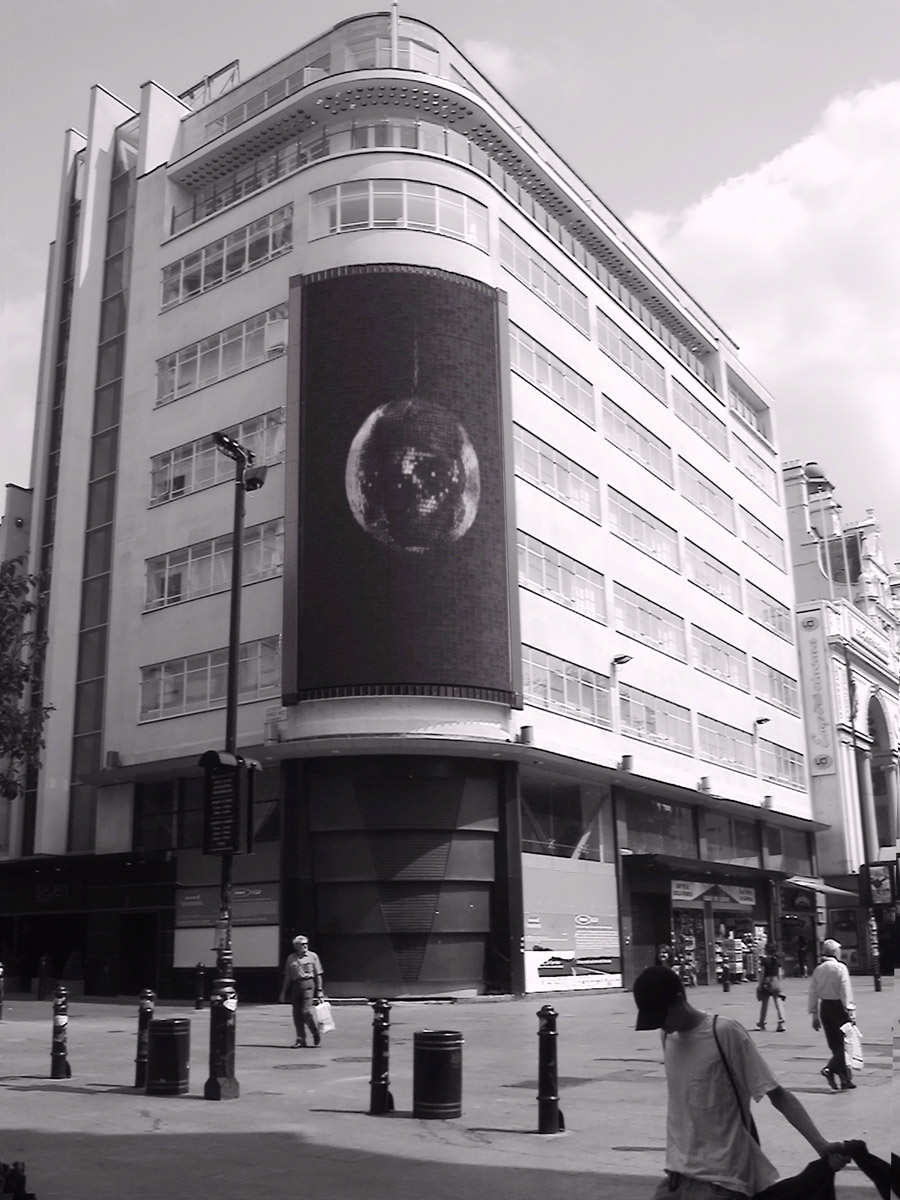
Celebrate Difference (Glitter Ball), first commercial billboard, Leicester Square, London UK, 2001

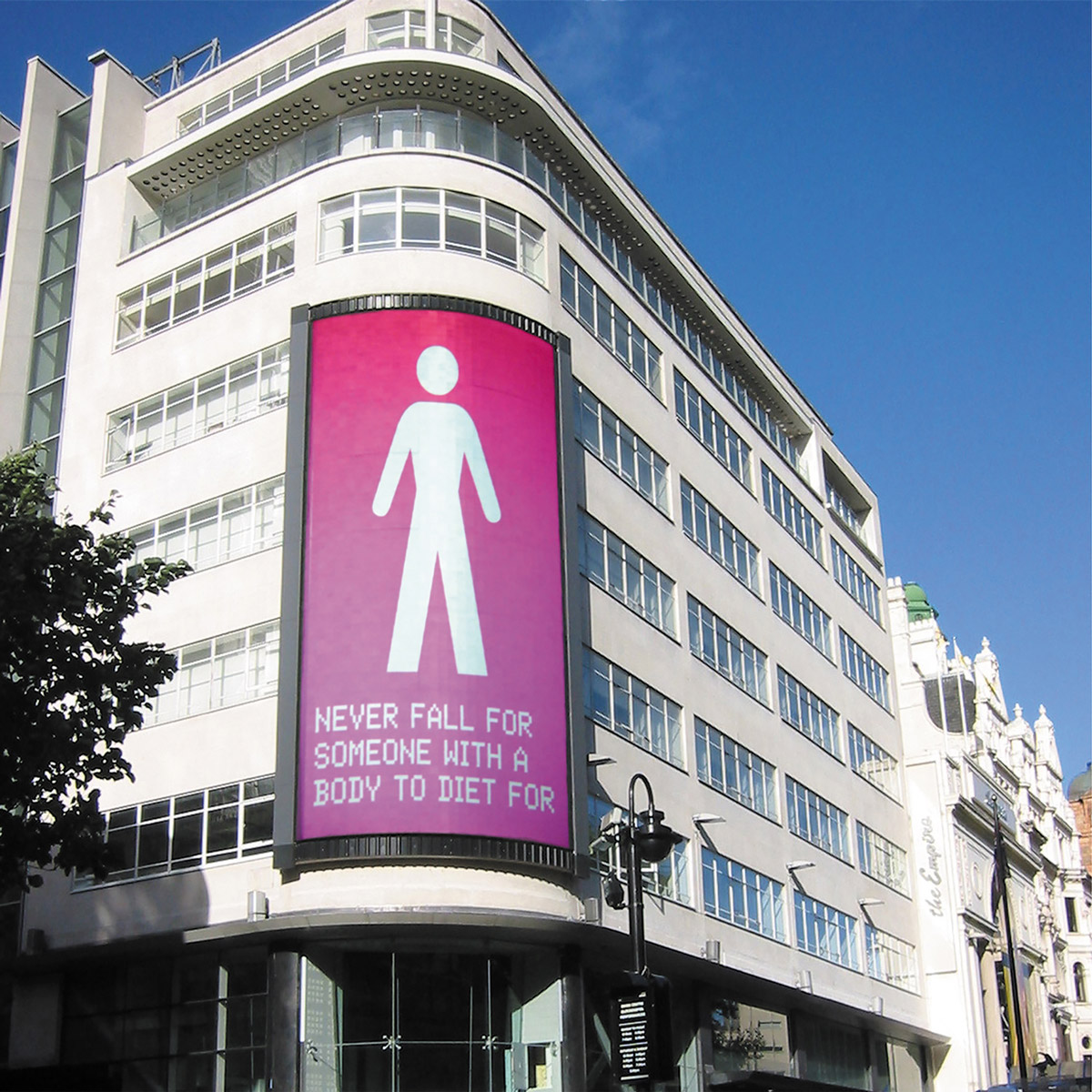
Never Fall for Someone with a Body To Diet for Leicester Square, London UK, 2001

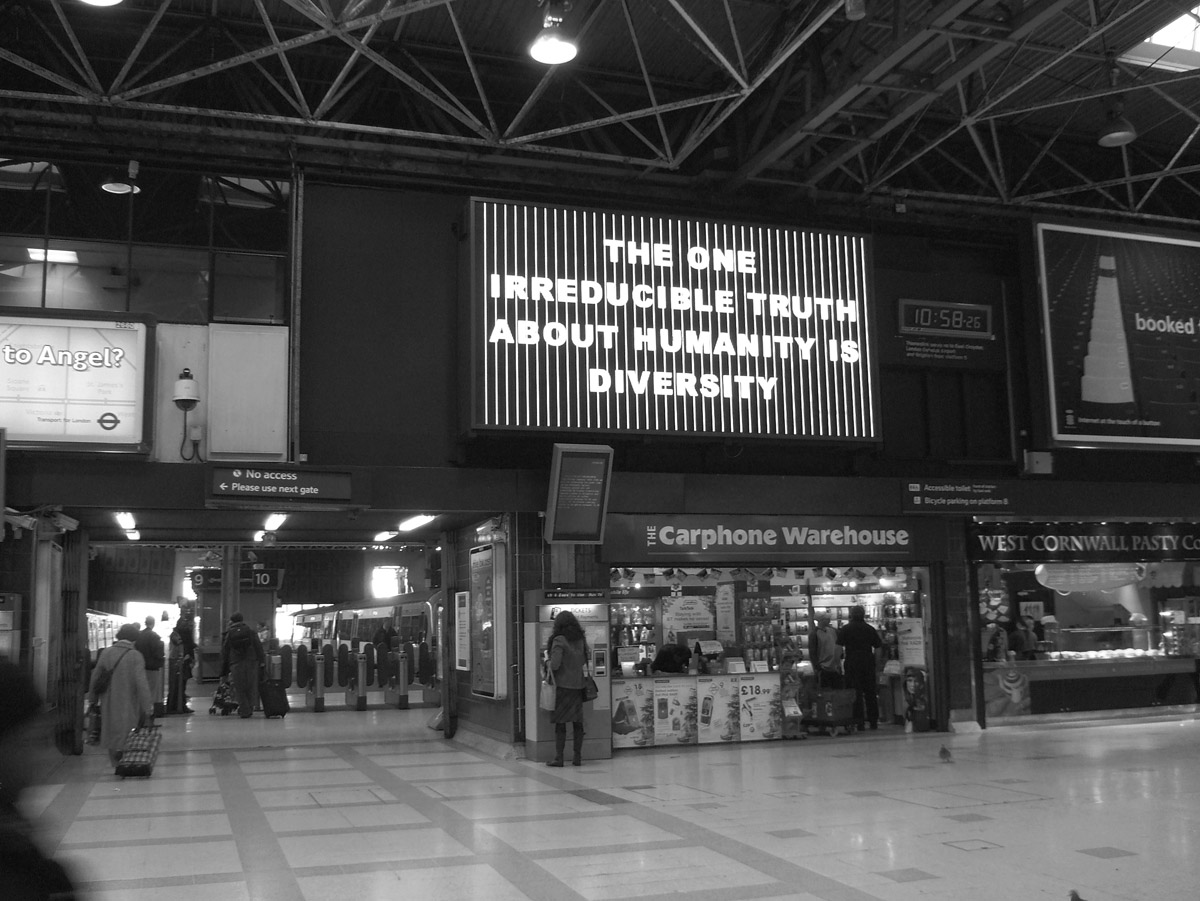
The One Irreducible Truth about Humanity Is Diversity mainline railway station, London UK, 2005

== Repurposed systems ==
Between 2003 and 2004, Firrell experimented with repurposing existing information systems. A Stronger Self was commissioned by Selfridges for the plasma screens recently installed throughout the London department store. Eleven short video sequences were screened continuously for six weeks from 1 February 2003. Texts explored the principles of self-possession, self-knowledge, and the relationship between self and other. Texts were combined with symbols of self including the artist's fingerprints and iris scans, images of Lord Krishna, Saraswati, lotus flowers, and cake. Early time-based works like this one were created using the now defunct Adobe Flash software, which raises a new set of challenges in relation to the restoration and conservation of works like this one and its contemporaries.

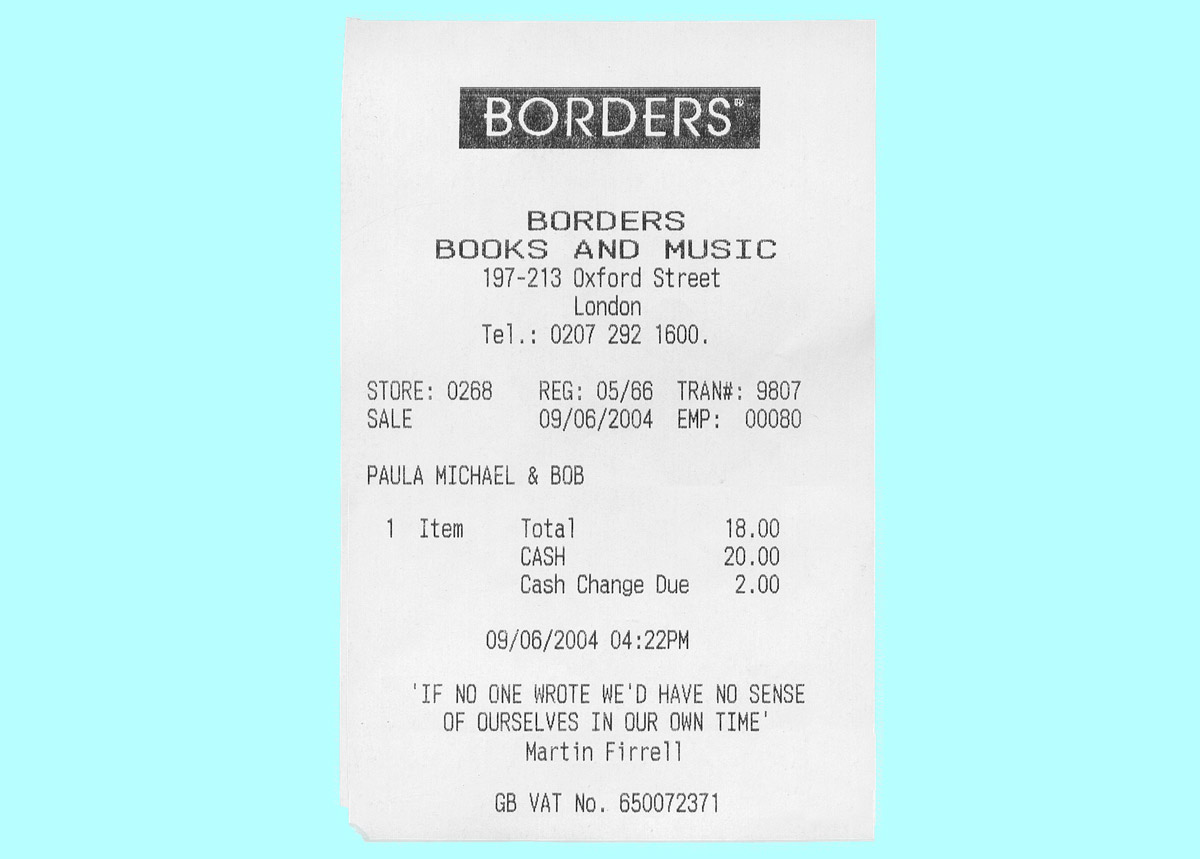
Paula, Michael and Bob, till receipt from reprogrammed Electronic Point of Sale, Borders Books, London UK, 2004

I Would Have Given Anything for Your Call was devised for the Samsung neon that once constituted a significant part of the advertising signs in Piccadilly Circus, London UK. The text, designed for the digital scroller above the Samsung neon logo, evokes the heightened receptiveness of new lovers to small joys or hurts.

Firrell repurposed the display monitor system at Liverpool Street station, London UK, in the same year. The standard security message was accompanied by an existential 'security message' about the burden of loneliness. It is not uncommon for railway stations to be regarded as anonymous spaces, teeming with people but simultaneously insulating people from one another. A Subterranean Sadness addresses this shared feeling of dissociation and the concomitant human desire for connection, not isolation.

Firrell reprogrammed the cash register system at Border's Books so that every Borders' till receipt carried a public art message about the societal importance of contemporary writing. In Paula, Michael and Bob, the added text conveys the idea that written culture is uniquely placed to reflect, and bring into awareness, the spirt of the times. Paula Yates came to prominence in the 1980s as co-presenter (with Jools Holland) of the Channel 4 pop music programme The Tube. Firrell's artwork was at once modest in ambition, requiring no additional resources for its execution, but broad in scope bringing many thousands of public art texts into circulation. Sufficient copies of the texts were distributed to qualify the artwork for the best-seller lists had it been a work of fiction rather than a freely distributed work of public art.

=== 2003-2004 ===
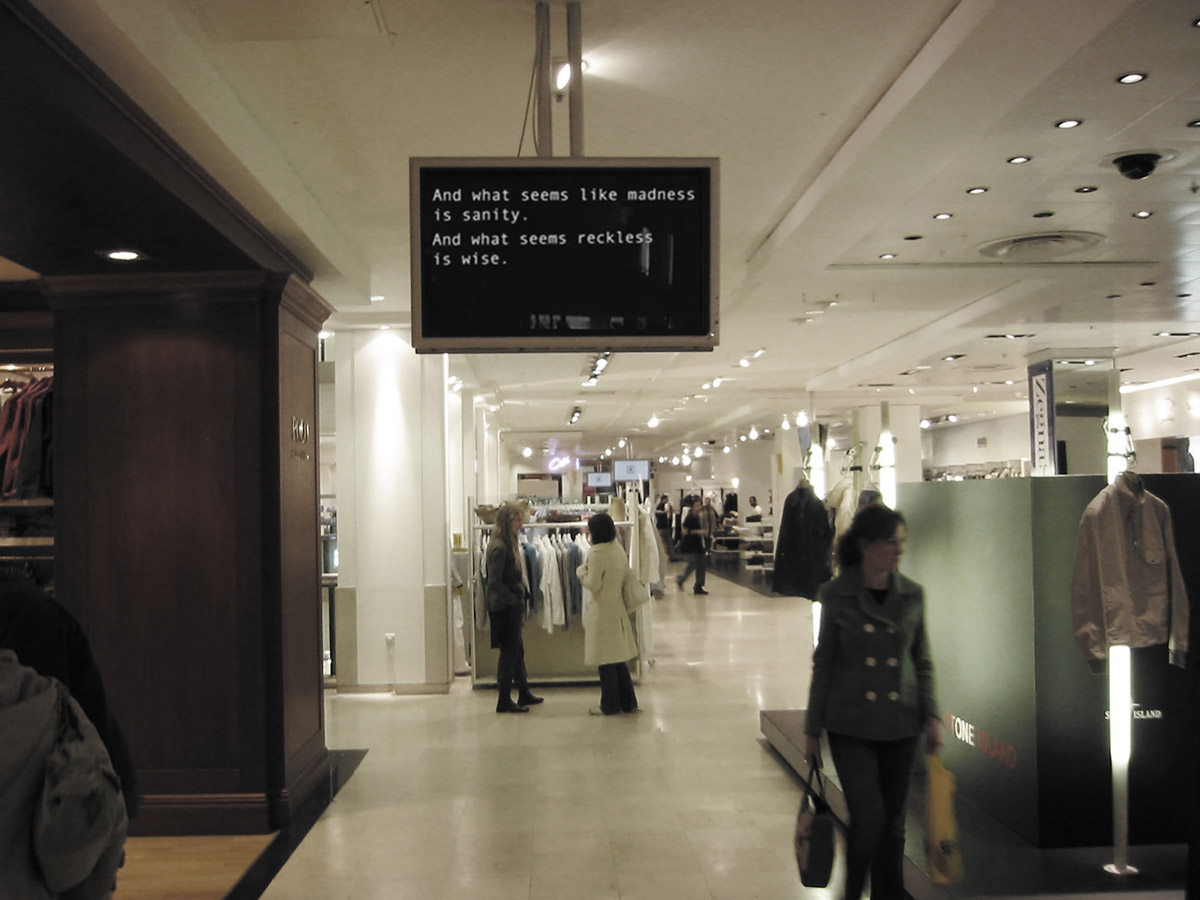
A Stronger Self, plasma screens, Selfridges, London UK, 2003

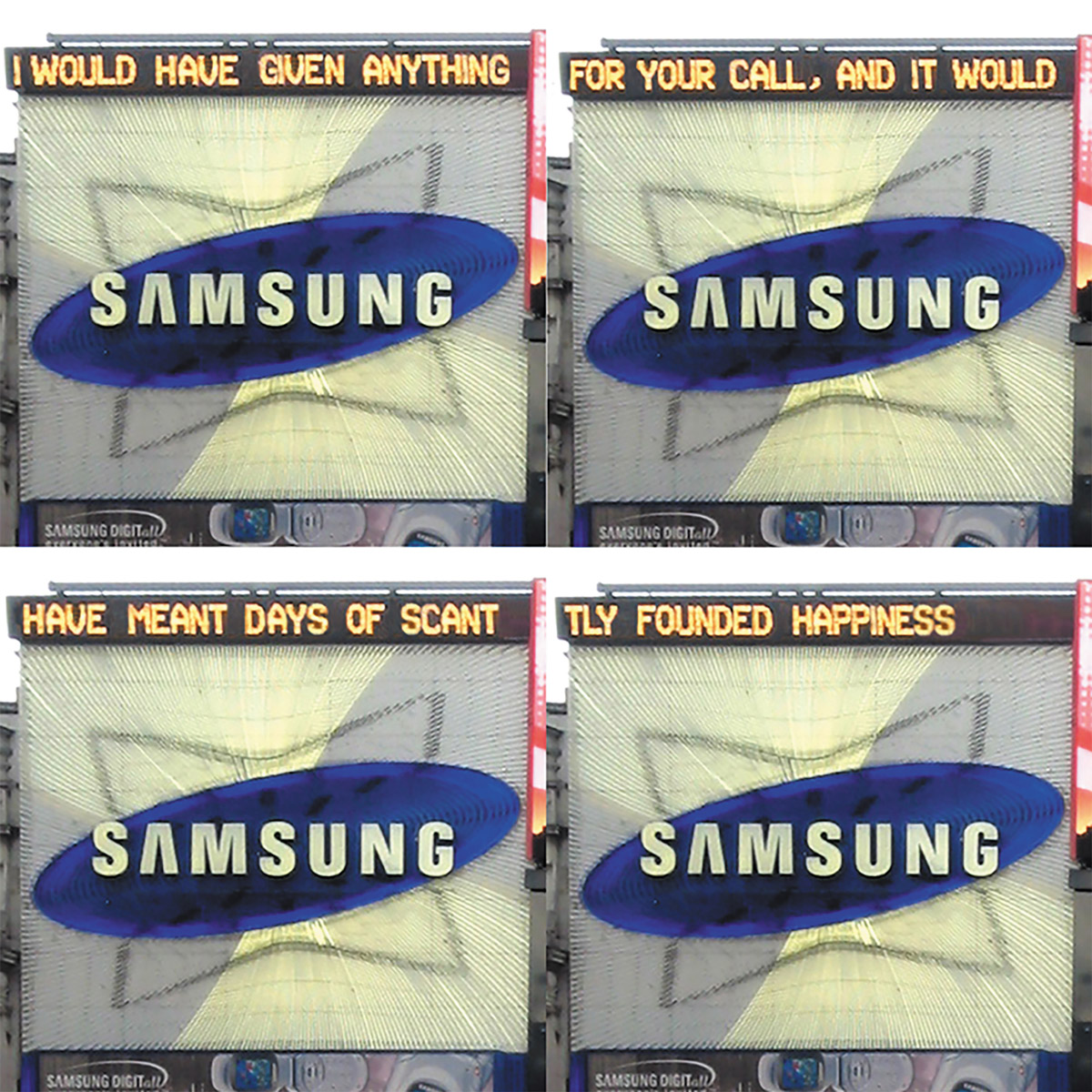
I Would Have Given Anything for Your Call, Old Samsung advertising sign, Piccadilly Circus, London UK, 2004

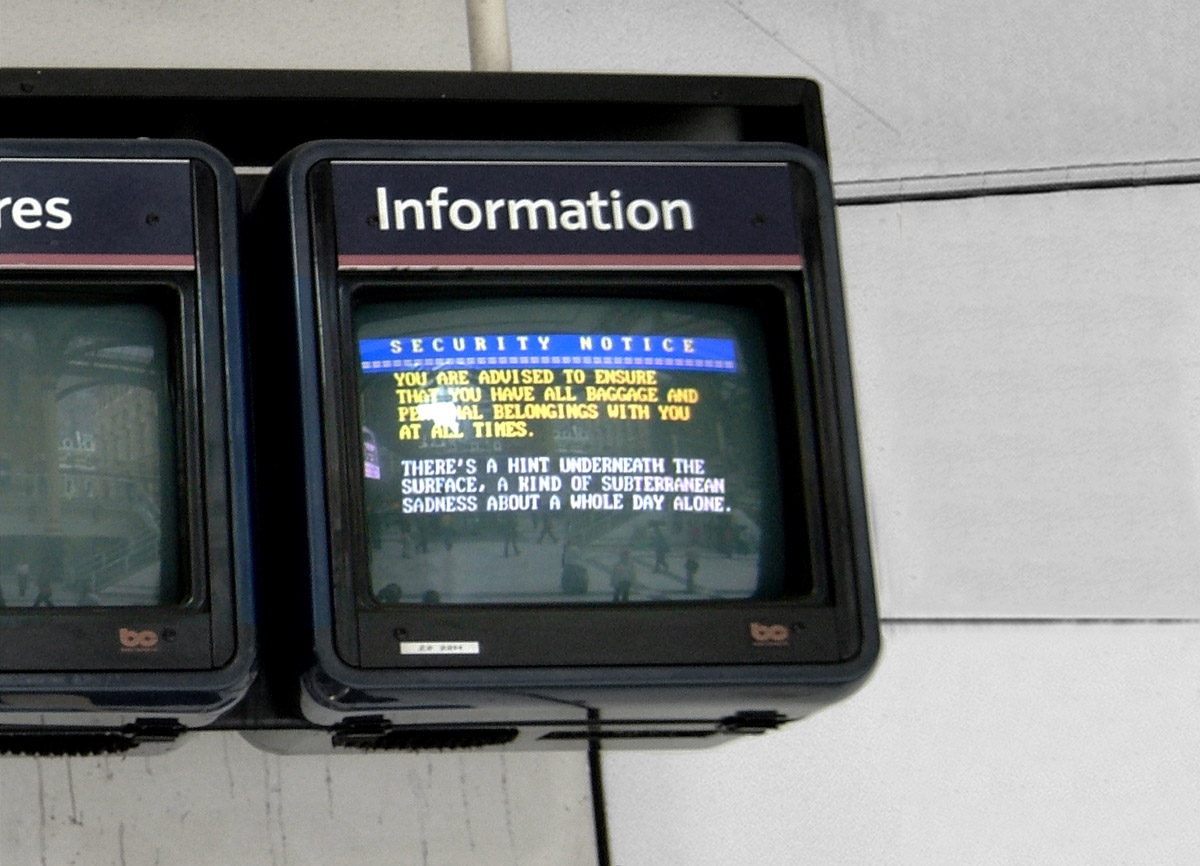
A Subterranean Sadness, repurposed Video Display Unit, Liverpool St Station, London UK, 2004

== Projections ==
Firrell was commissioned by The Guardian newspaper in 2006 to propose an original work for the paper, responding to a contemporary news item. Firrell proposed a large-scale projection onto Parliament of the text, When the World's Run by Fools It's the Duty of Intelligence To Disobey as a comment on the Racial and Religious Hatred Act 2006 - a piece of UK legislation that was well-intentioned but with serious consequences for free speech in its originally proposed form. The artwork published by The Guardian was an artist's impression but was mistaken by most readers for a realised artwork. Many commissions followed on the basis that Firrell, who had never created an outdoor projection at the time, was an expert in the medium. Firrell did not correct this impression, but went on to make large-scale digital projections for the Guards Chapel, Household Division of the British Army, the National Gallery in London, the Houses of Parliament, the Royal Opera House, Covent Garden, Tate Britain, and St Paul's Cathedral.

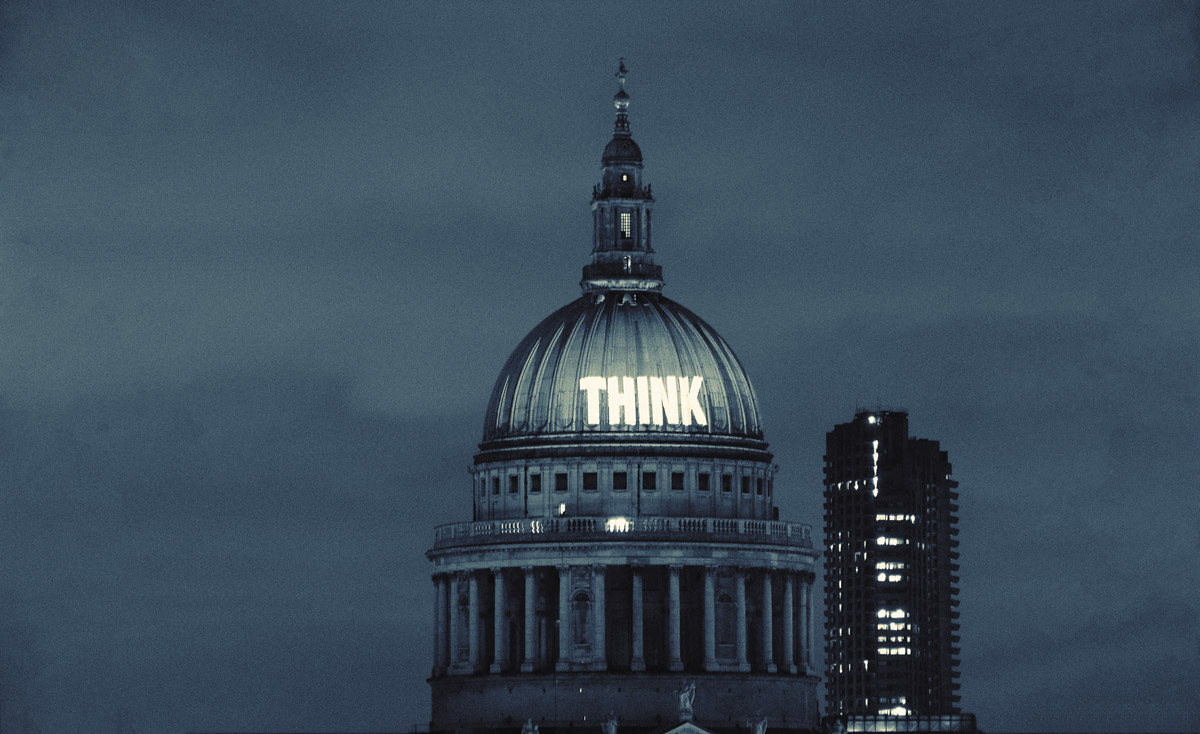
The Question Mark Inside (Think), St. Paul's Cathedral London UK, 2008

The Question Mark Inside was commissioned by Dean and Chapter of St Paul's Cathedral. It was the first large-scale public artwork in the cathedral's history. Firrell served as Public Artist in Residence 2007-8, marking the 300th anniversary of the topping-out of Sir Christopher Wren's architectural masterpiece in 2008.

The Question Mark Inside posed the simple question, 'What makes life meaningful and purposeful?' and invited responses from the public during the anniversary year. Firrell investigated belief, non-belief and the politics of both positions in conversation with the clergy at St Paul's, novelist Howard Jacobson, humanist philosopher A C Grayling, and columnist Caitlin Moran. The resulting texts, from the domestic to the sexual to the sublime, were projected onto the exterior of the cathedral dome, the West Front at Ludgate Hill, and the interior of the Whispering Gallery.

As Artist in Residence with the Household Division of the British Army 2009, Firrell presented contemporary and plural definitions of heroism. The moving-image projection work Complete Hero included interviews with Lance Corporal Johnson Beharry VC; with writers, thinkers and performers including actor Nathan Fillion speaking of the contemporary male hero in popular culture, writer Adam Nicolson speaking of the hero in antiquity, with the transgender writer and speaker April Ashley, comedian Shazia Mirza, and philosopher A. C. Grayling.

Deborah Bull, as Creative Director of the Royal Opera House, said of Firrell: "He's seeking to move beyond simple messages to something which provokes in the viewer a new sense of themselves and their place in the world".

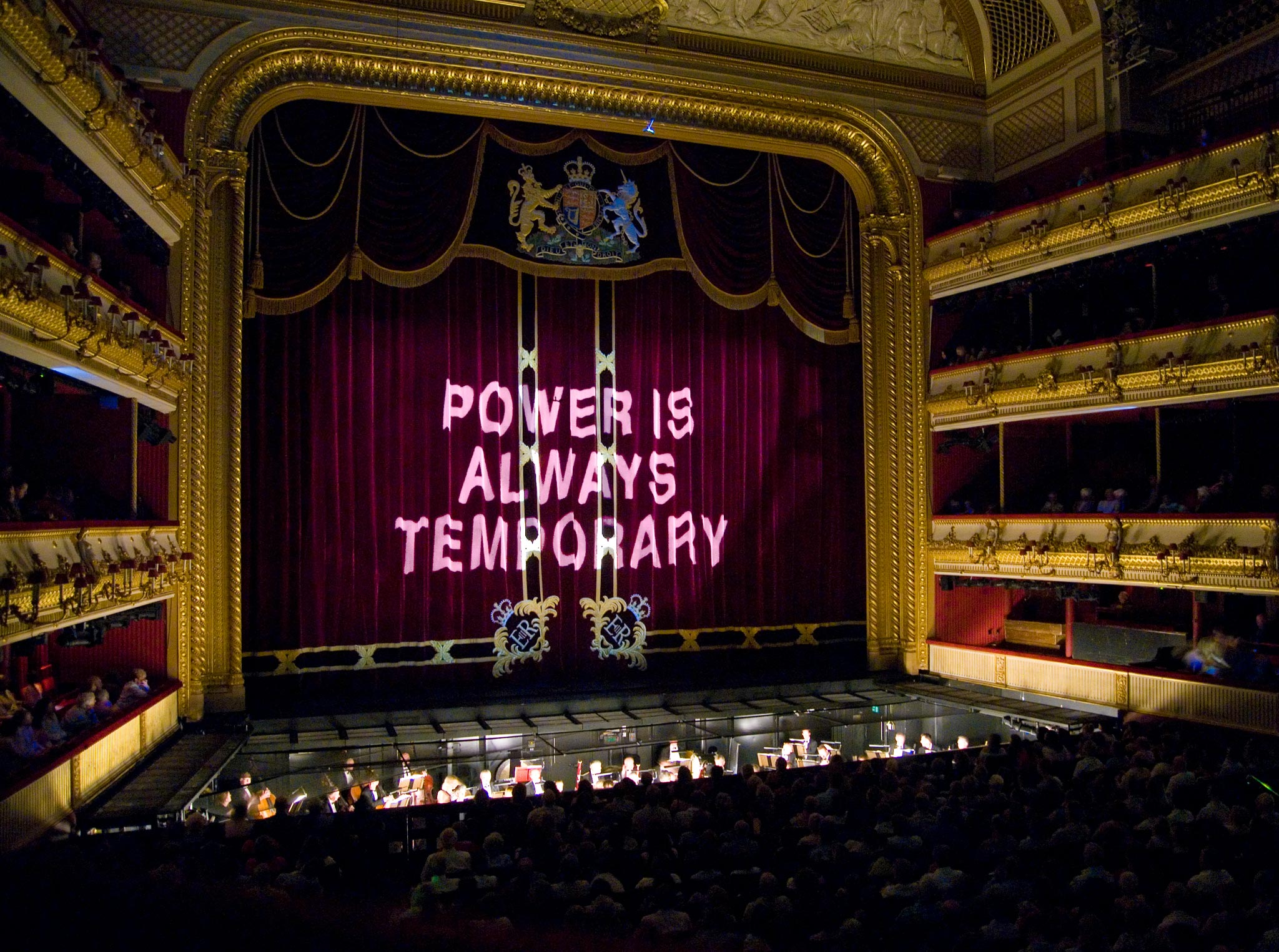
Power Is Always Temporary, Royal Opera House, London UK, 2007

The Question Mark Inside, a television documentary produced by Simon Channing Williams, was first broadcast by Sky Arts 1 on 29 October 2009, and provided new insights into the artist's practice. Firrell discussed his view that contemporary art has lost its way, serving a self-elected elite, rather than the wider interests of humanity. Art's proper place is at the centre of everyday life as a powerful force for good, a joyous expression of our shared humanity. Firrell's personal motto is "why settle for the art world when you can have the whole world?" The purpose of existence is to develop the richness and meaning of lived experience - art and culture in general should be key contributors to this central project and their success or otherwise can be measured against this criterion.

About working with text Firrell said, "I felt there was a problem with narrative because it unfolds in time necessarily, and I was jealous of the painters where everything in painting is available in a single field. Simply, I wanted to make words work like a picture and that led me to writing aphorisms. When I wrote All Men Are Dangerous for Tate Britain, I wrote something of immense truthfulness and importance with all of its meaning entirely available in a single field."

In most of Firrell's works uppermost is the belief in the redemptive power of ideas, directed at extending or protecting the right of the individual to create their own unique way of life and to live it accordingly without interference. Firrell has worked with complex and influential organisations, including the Church of England (Public Artist in Residence, St Paul's Cathedral, 2008 and again in 2016) and the British Army (Artist in Residence, Household Division, 2009). These organisations have engaged with self-questioning content including I don't think this is what God intended (The Question Mark Inside, West Front, St Paul's Cathedral, 2008) and War is always a failure (Complete Hero, North elevation, Guards Chapel, 2009).

In 2006, The Guardian described Firrell as "One of the capital's most influential public artists". In The Independent, Howard Jacobson wrote, "I like words on public buildings and Firrell is a master at gauging their power." Caitlin Moran for The Times described Firrell's work as being built on "huge, open-chord statements that make your ears ring".

Several themes and campaign positions recur in the artist's body of work: a plea for the value of things that are different and the point of view that what is different should be investigated for potential rather than rejected as "other" or perceived with suspicion or fear (Celebrate Difference, LED screen, Leicester Square 2001; Different Is Not Wrong, Curzon Cinemas, 2006–7; I Want To Live In A City Where People Who Think Differently Command Respect, The National Gallery, London, 2006). The artist has also campaigned consistently for gender equality and from what is customarily regarded as a feminist position (I Want To Live In A City Where Half The People In Charge Are Women, The National Gallery, London, 2006; Why Are Women Still Discriminated Against? The Question Mark Inside, St Paul's Cathedral, London 2008); Women Are Much More Honourable Than Men, quoting April Ashley, Complete Hero, Guards Chapel, London, 2009). War is often commented on but not necessarily from a purely pacifist perspective (All Men Are Dangerous, War Is A Male Preoccupation, Keep The Faith, Tate Britain 2006; I Don't Understand Why There Is War, The Question Mark Inside, St Paul's Cathedral, London, 2008; War Is Always A Failure, Complete Hero, Guards Chapel, London 2009).

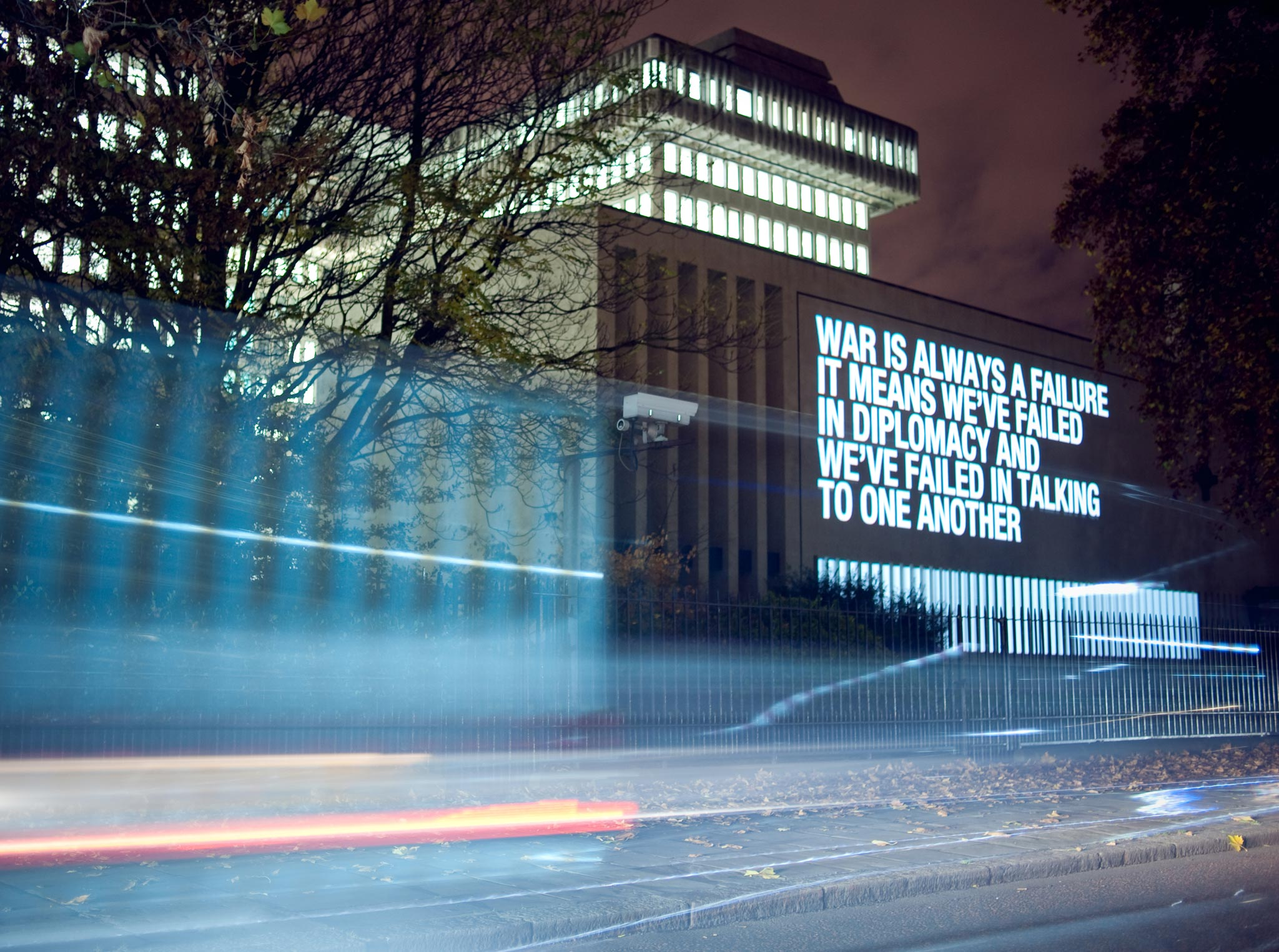
War Is Always a Failure, Guards' Chapel, Wellington Barracks, British Army, London UK, 2009

The majority of these works include some form of ancillary visual motif. Most common are vertical lines, either scrolling from left to right, or presented as static fields in "agitated motion". Vertical lines are used to back, or underscore text, or to reveal and obscure text. Customarily the lines have been presented as white light. This vertical line motif appeared in every work between 2006 and 2010 with the exception of I Want To Live in a City Where... (The National Gallery, London, 2006).

Firrell returned to projection in 2016 with Fires Ancient & Modern, commissioned by Artichoke as part of London's Burning, a festival of arts and ideas to commemorate the 350th anniversary of the Great Fire of London. Firrell used high definition digital projection to set the dome of St Pauls "ablaze" again and explored metaphorical and often lesser known "fires" from the history of progressivism. Against the fly-tower of the National Theatre, Fires Modern presented 18 moments in the history of the progressive movement including reference to black history, the history of the women's rights movement, fascism in Britain, racism, murder, and contemporary references to social inclusion movements like LGBT+ and modern race equality.

=== 2006-2009, 2016 ===
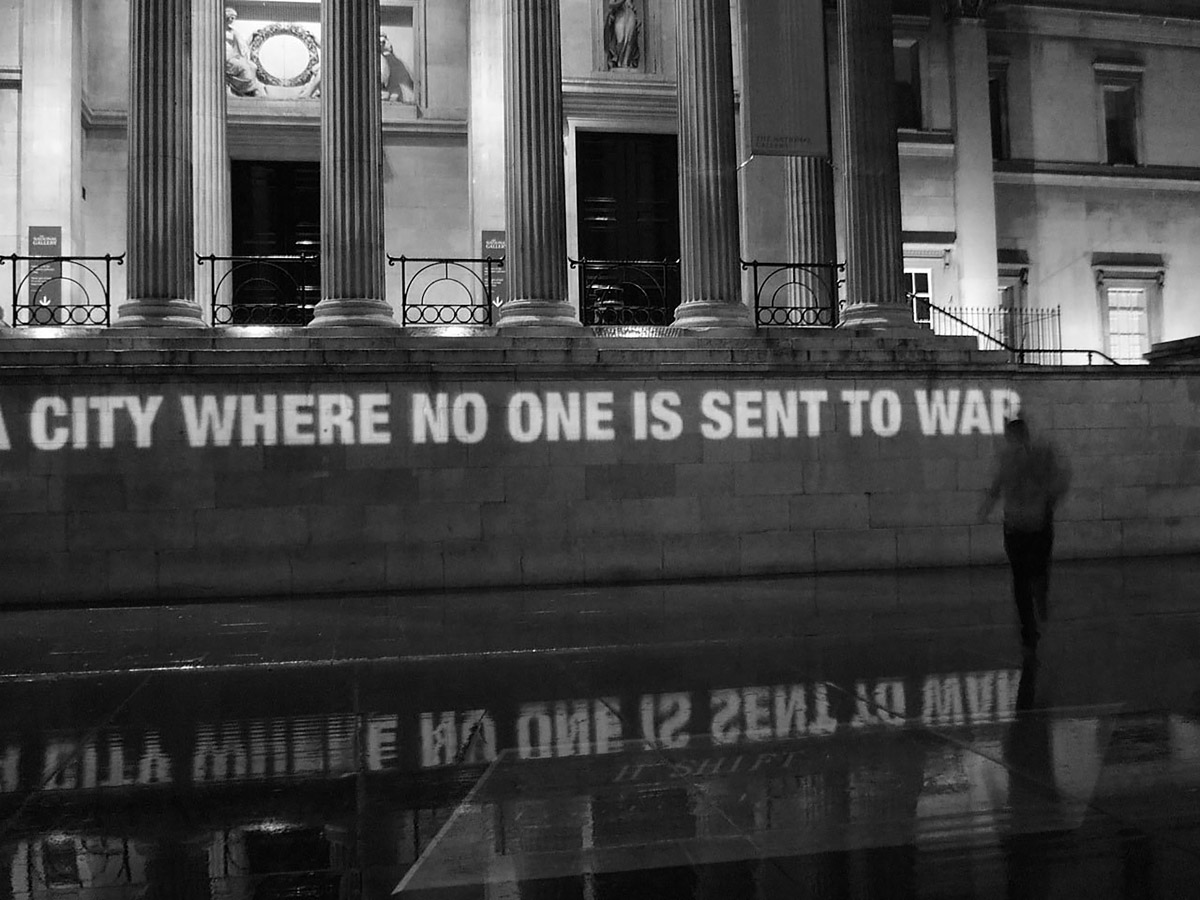
I Want To Live in a City Where No One Is Sent to War, the National Gallery, London UK, 2006

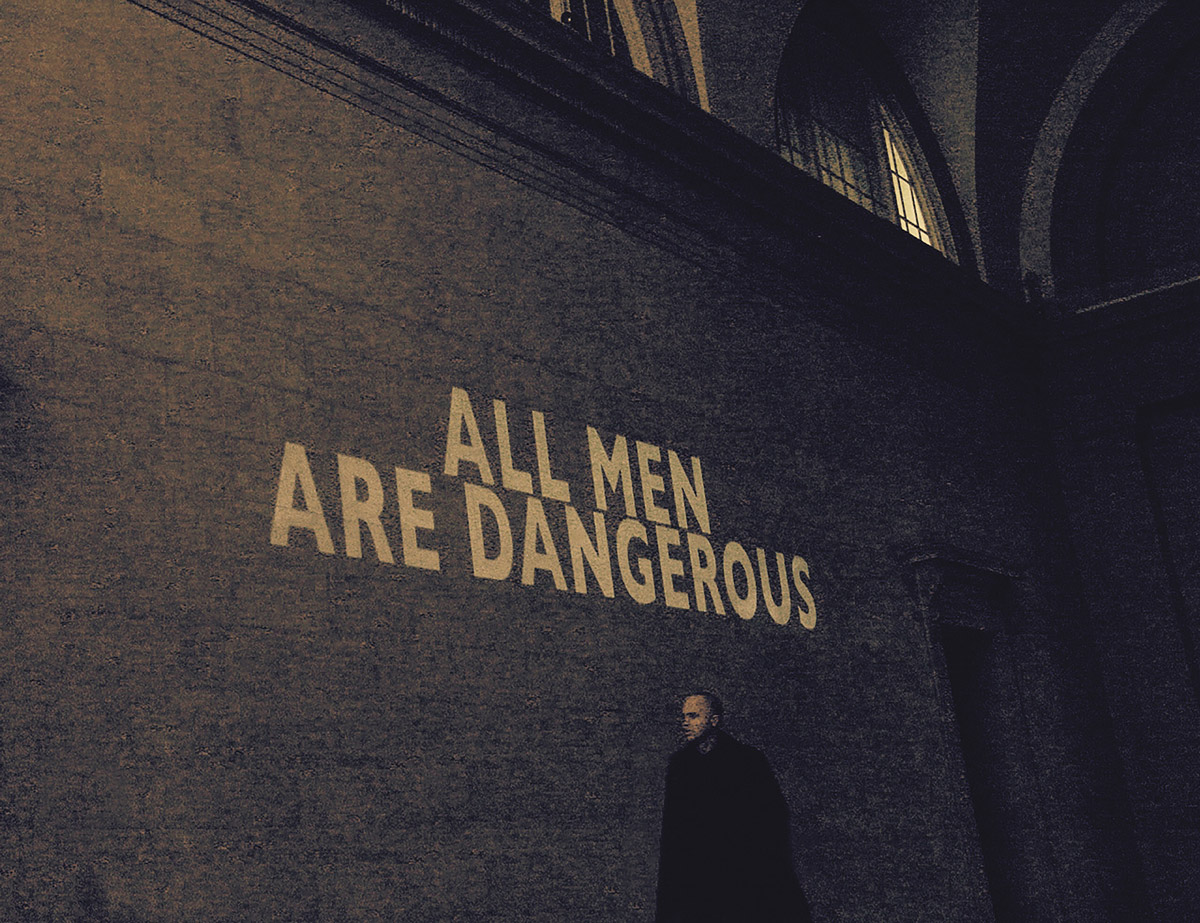
All Men Are Dangerous, Tate Britain, London UK, 2006

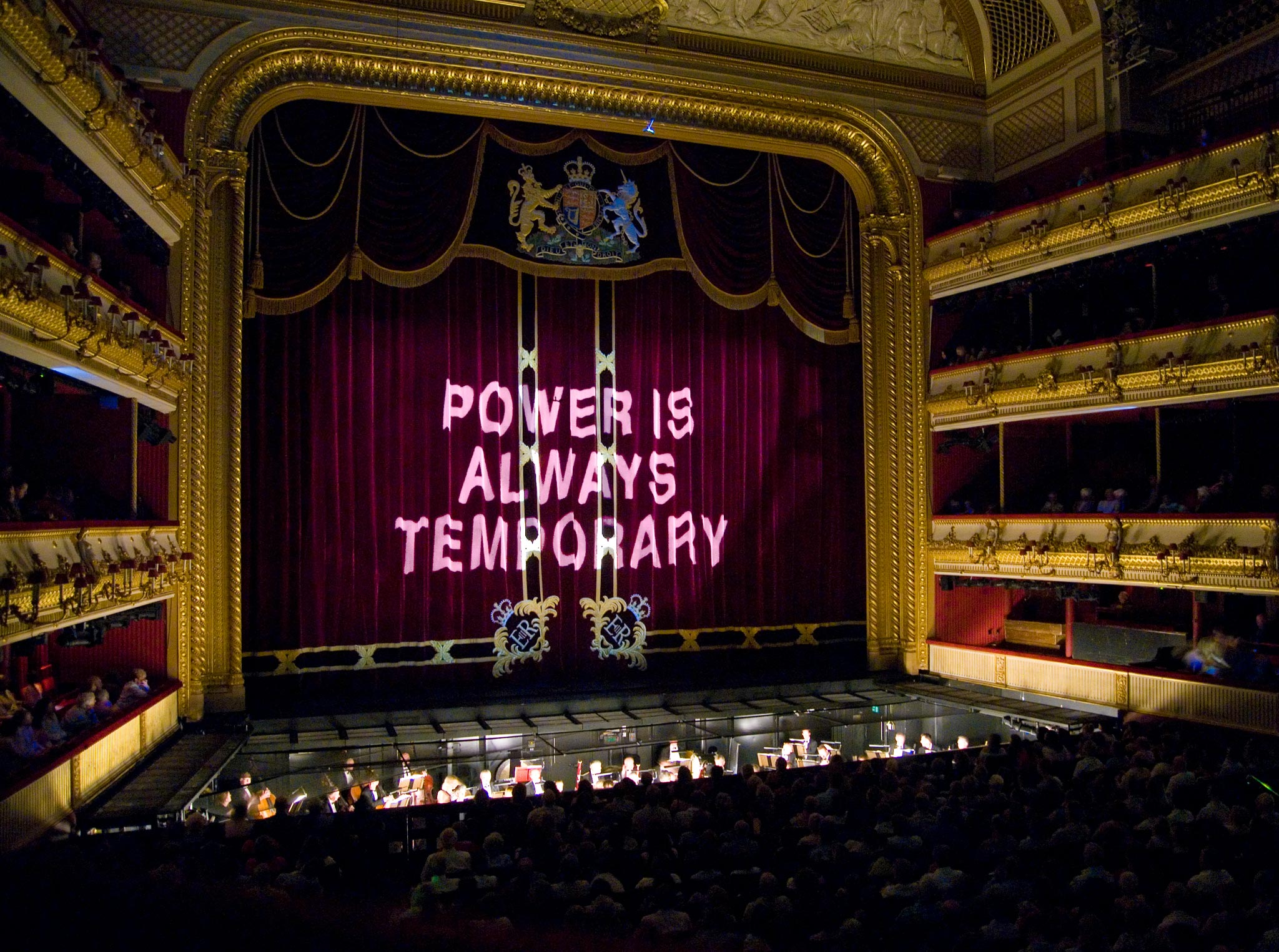
Power Is Always Temporary, Royal Opera House, London UK, 2007

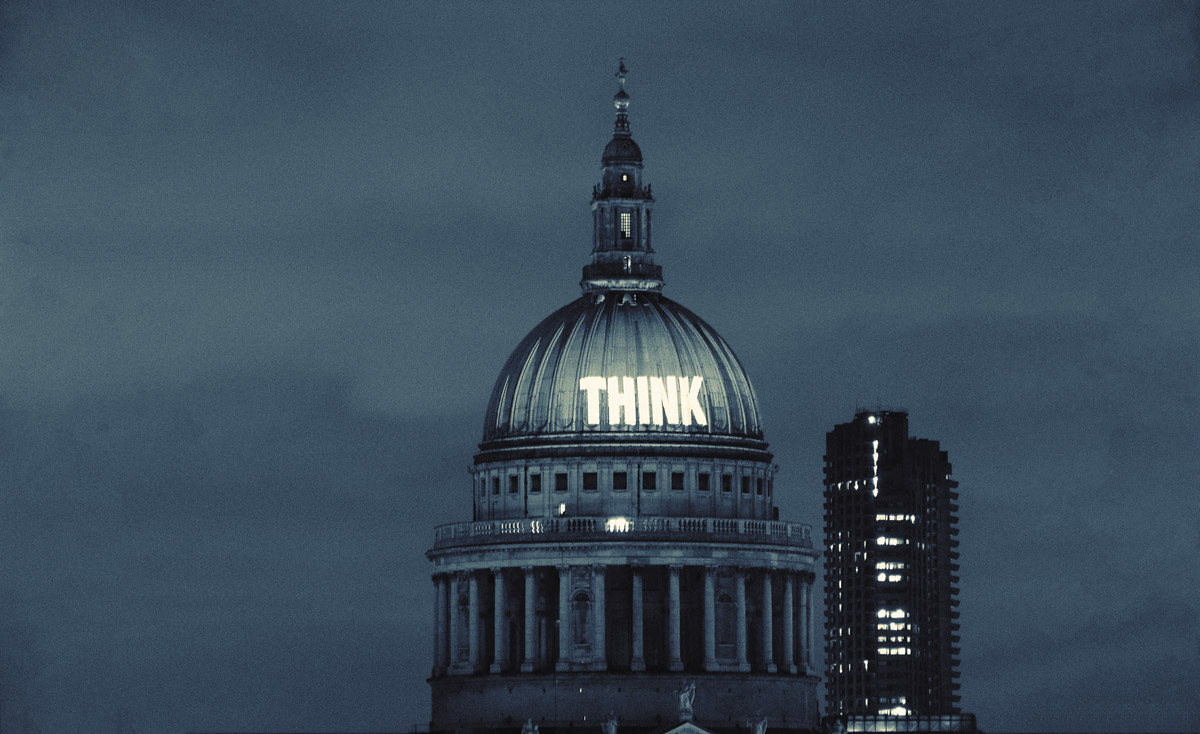
The Question Mark Inside (Think), St. Paul's Cathedral London UK, 2008

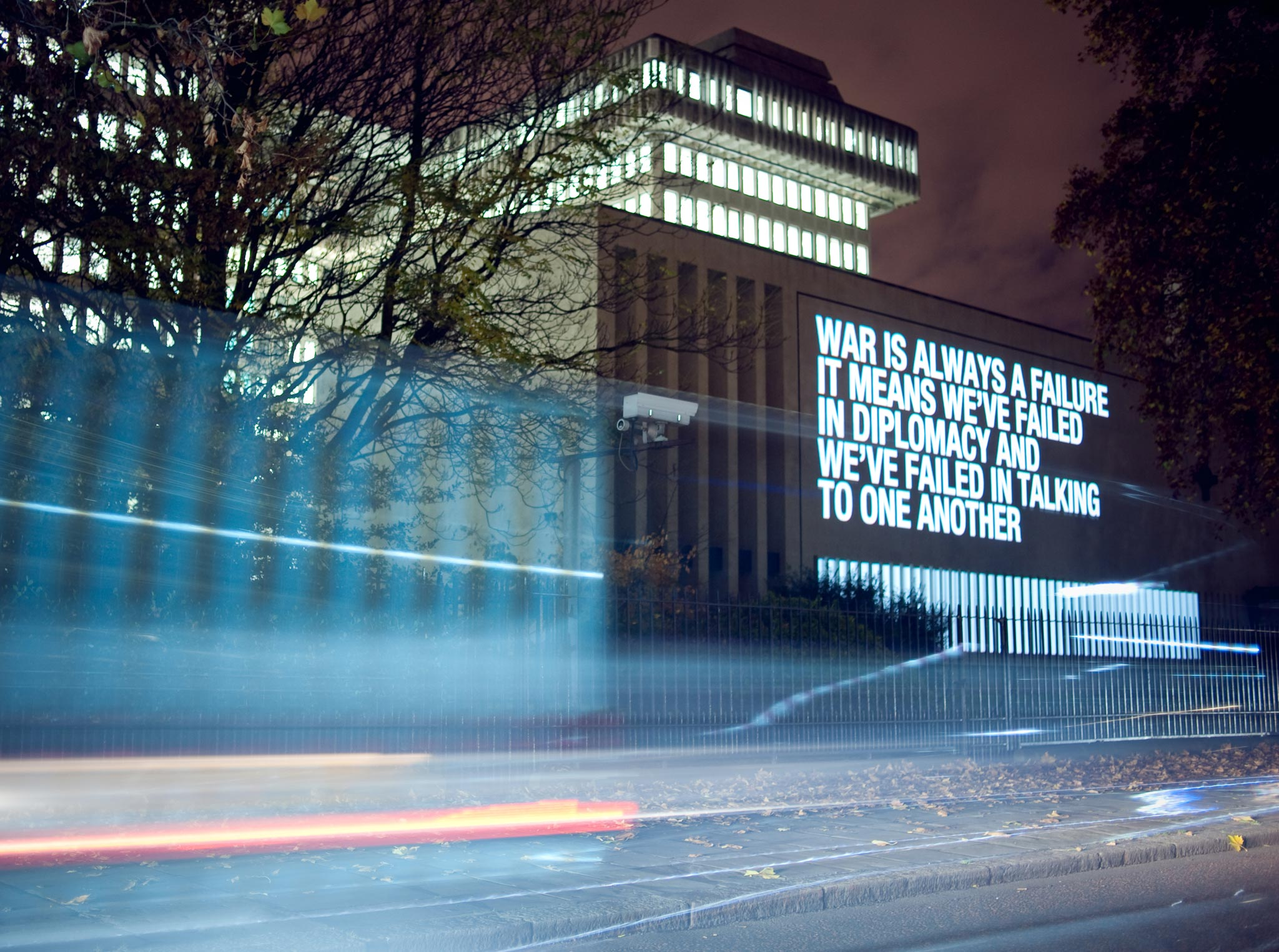
War Is Always a Failure, Guards' Chapel, Wellington Barracks, British Army, London UK, 2009

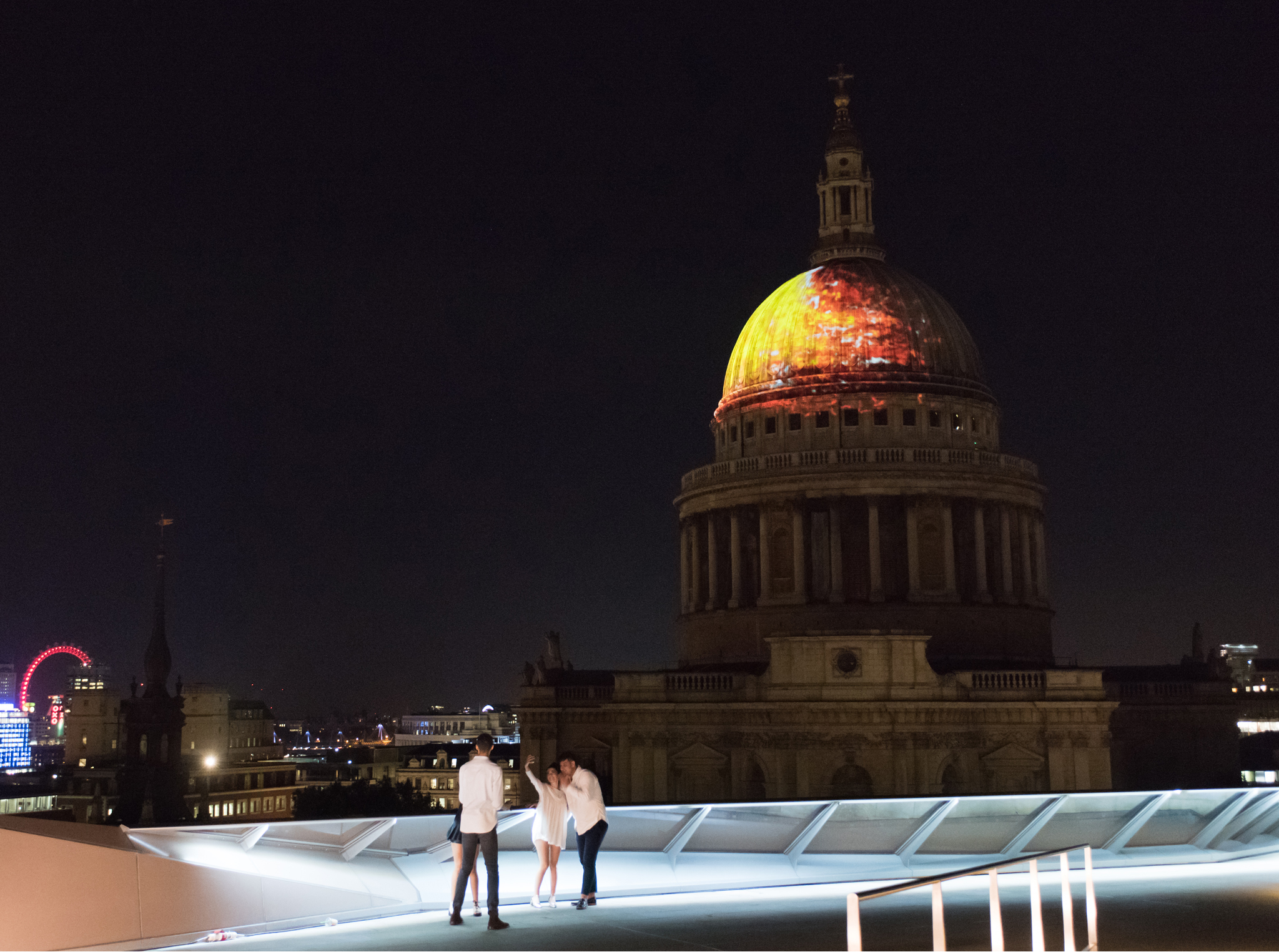
Fires Ancient, St. Paul's Cathedral London UK, 2016

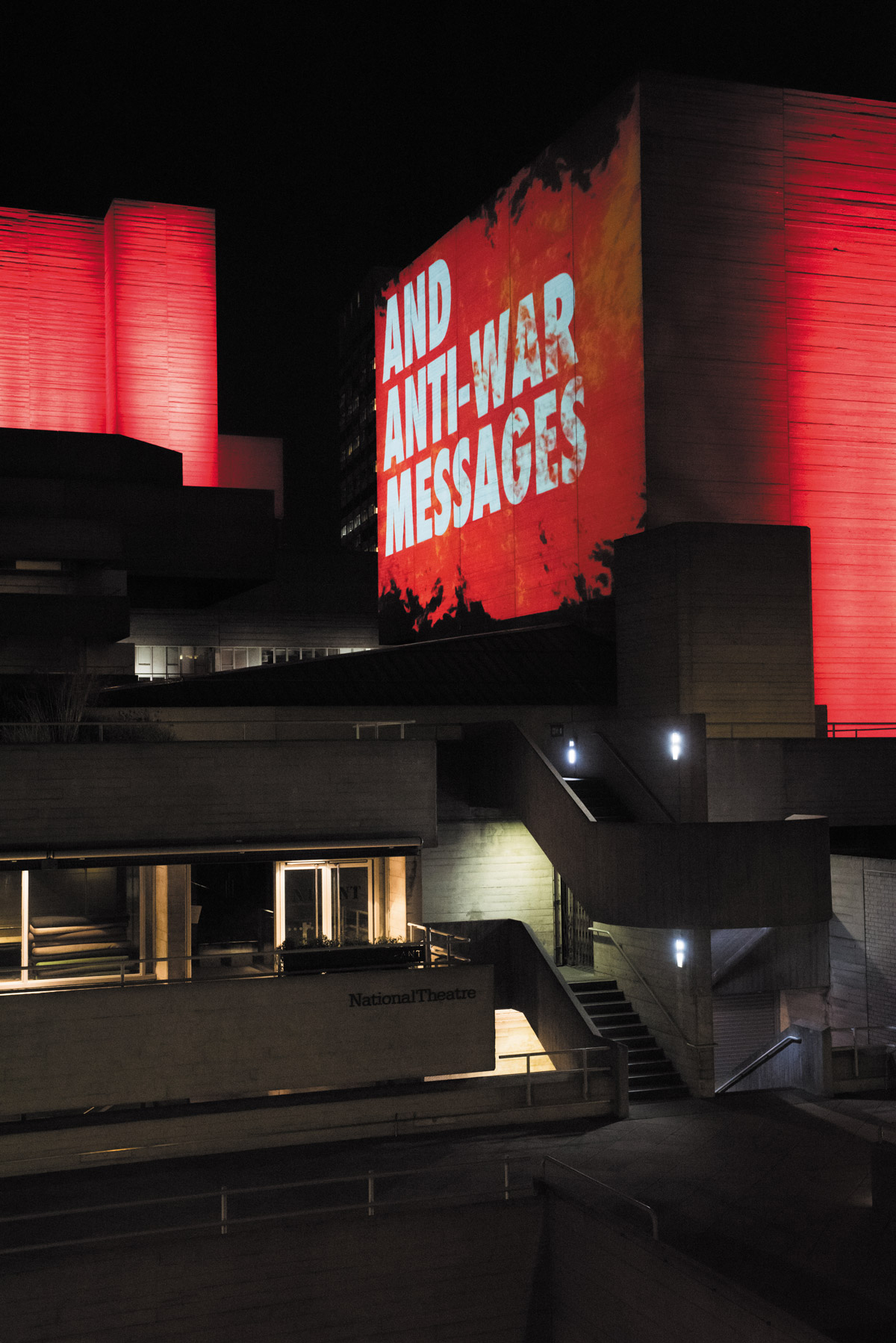
Fires Modern, Royal National Theatre London UK, 2016

== Cinema and pop culture ==
A series of works explore the artist's contention that 'popular culture may be better than high culture at disseminating valuable ideas about living well to the greatest number of people'.

Untitled (Curzon Trailer) appeared before each feature film screened by Curzon Cinemas in 2006. The work reflects on the impact of globalisation and its reliance on uniformity. Text flickers and glows to a soundtrack of repeated, and disconcerting, hissing-and-clicking. We are reminded that conformity is a prerequisite for globalisation and that danger is imminent when difference is questioned, removed or destroyed. The trailer concludes with a set of 'grounding or corrective statements' including, A Loud Voice Is Not Charisma, Shopping Is Not Happiness and Different Is Not Wrong.

Metascifi (iOS app published 4 April 2015, now retired) deconstructed popular American television science fiction for philosophical ideas about living well. Contributors included Kate Mulgrew (aka Captain Kathryn Janeway, Star Trek: Voyager), Joe Flanigan (aka Colonel John Sheppard from Stargate Atlantis), Torri Higginson (aka Dr Elizabeth Weir, Stargate Atlantis), Ben Browder (aka Commander John Crichton, Farscape) and Nathan Fillion (aka Captain Malcolm Reynolds, Firefly (TV series)).

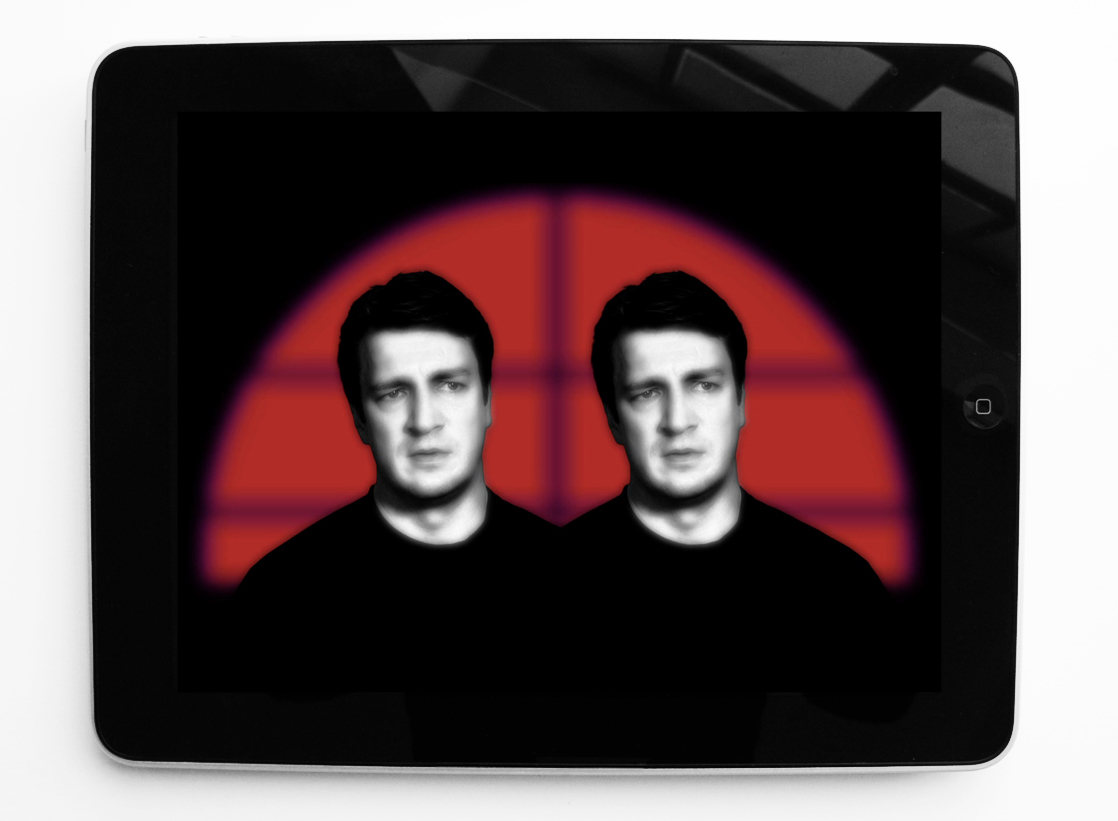
Metascifi featuring Nathan Fillion

It Ends Here (2014) was commissioned by 20th Century Fox to coincide with the release of the eighth film in the Planet of the Apes franchise, Dawn of the Planet of the Apes. Firrell sought truths from the film that 'cast light on our attempts to live humanely in an over-crowded and tension-filled world" The artist deployed live performers in five different theatrical environments underground.

Metafenella is an interactive video portrait of the late British actress Fenella Fielding. Video portraiture draws life lessons from Fielding's roles as the vampiric Valeria Watt in Carry On Screaming, as Herself and Lady Hamilton in The Morecambe & Wise Show, and as The Voice in the TV series The Prisoner. "I try to affect the texture of the moment because the only thing we can be sure of is this actual moment in our lives."

May 1968 compares the readiness to protest in France in 1968 with the apparent apathy in the UK 40 years later. Firrell's May 1968 was screened by Curzon Cinemas as part of the 2008 festival All Power to the Imagination: 1968 and its Legacies. The work asked the question, 'Where are the mass protests now? Against detention without trial? Against compulsory ID cards? Against illegal war?' This is the first of the artist's works to deal explicitly with the mechanics of protest.

=== 2006-2014 ===
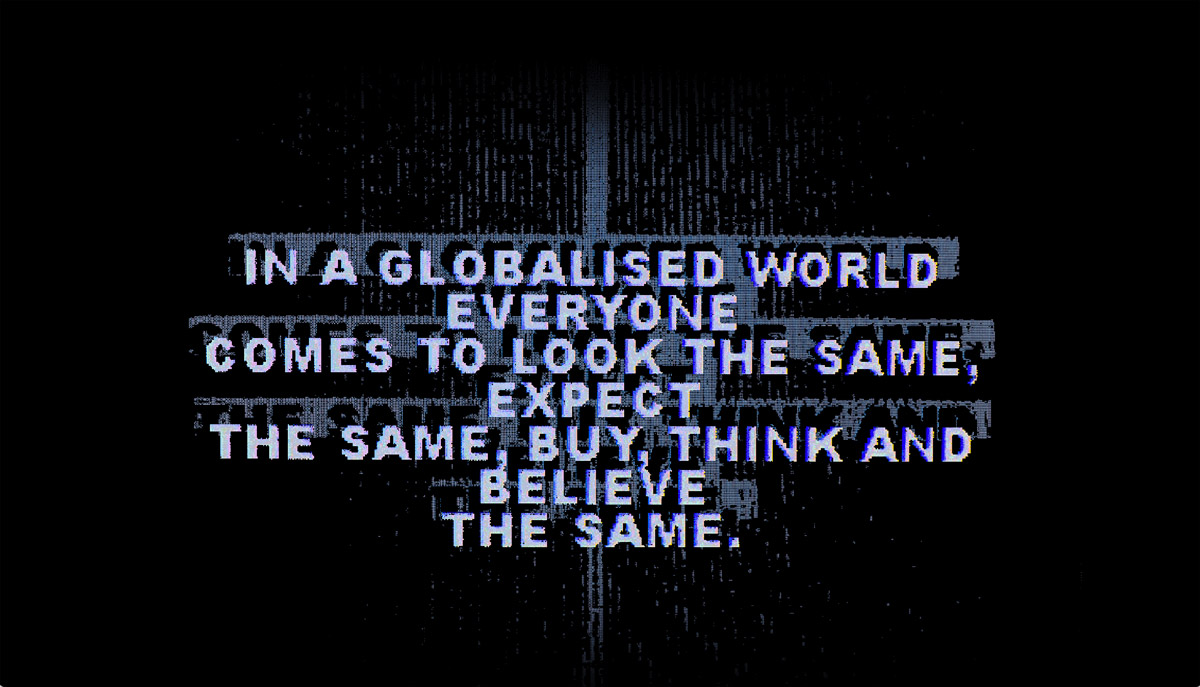
In a Globalised World Everyone Comes to Look the Same, Expect the Same, Buy, Think and Believe the Same from Untitled (Curzon Trailer), Curzon Cinemas, London UK, 2006

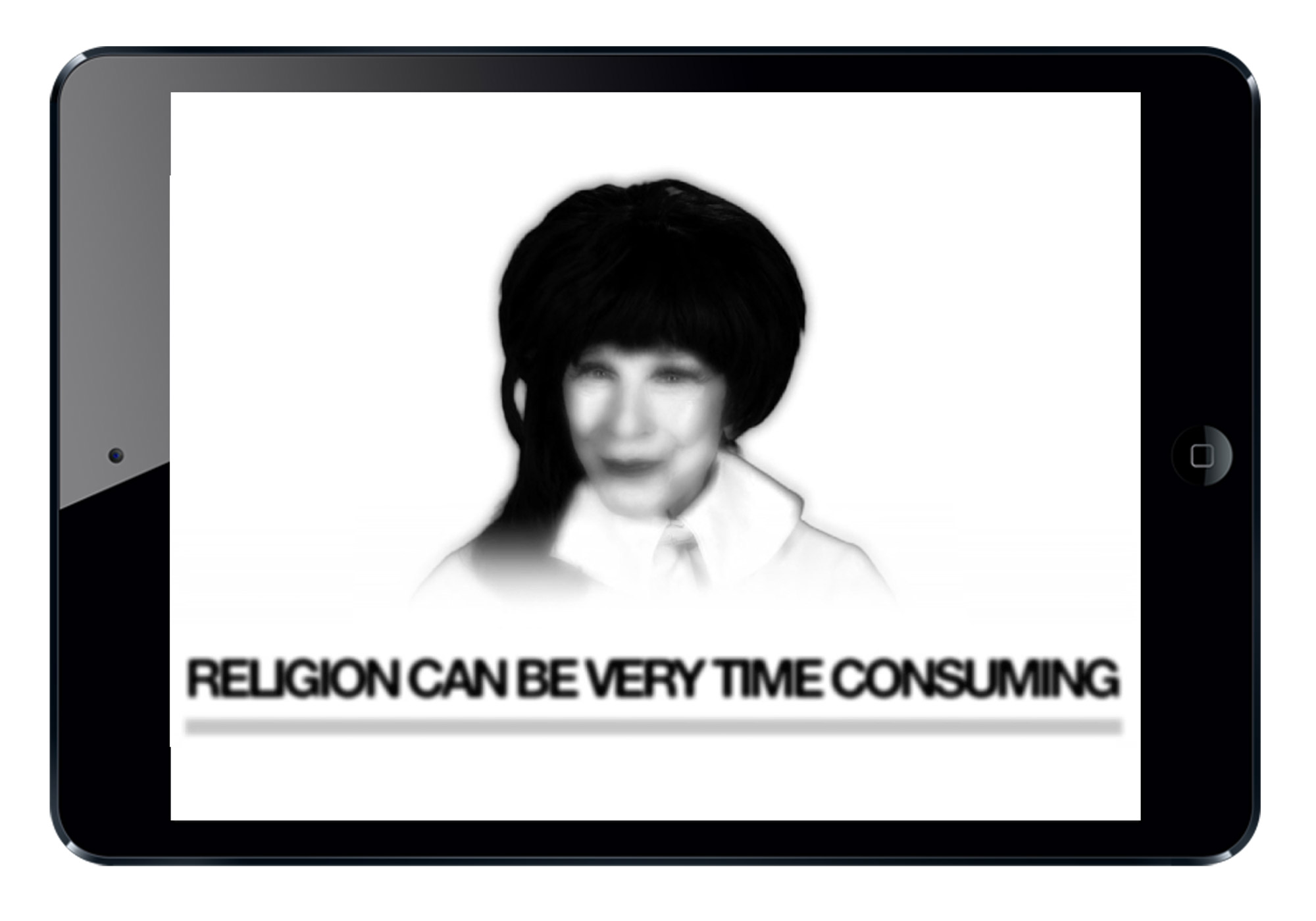
Religion Can Be Very Time Consuming from MetaFenella, digital portrait of British actress Fenella Fielding, 2014

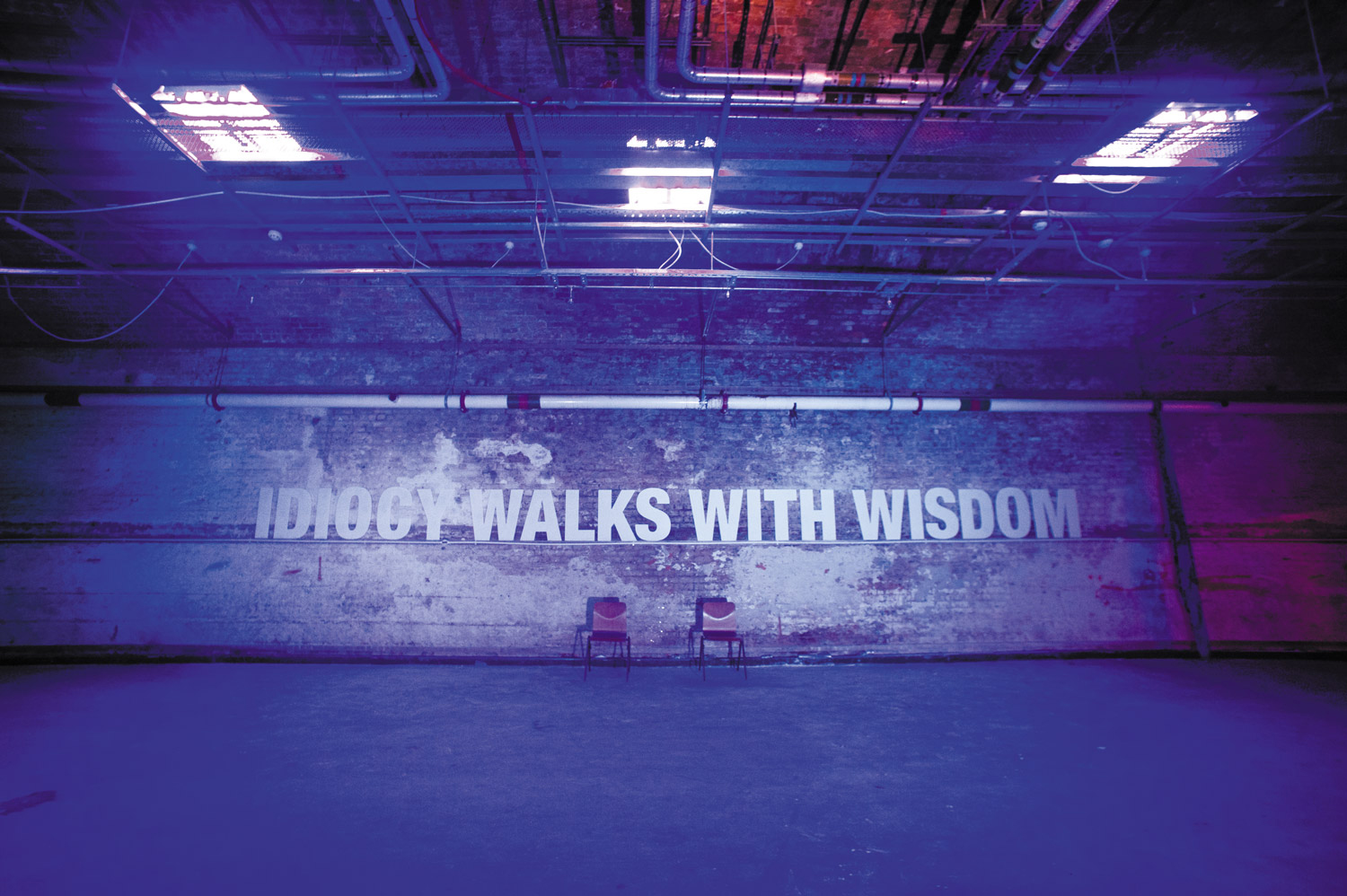
Idiocy Walks With Wisdom from It Ends Here commissioned by 20th Century Fox, London UK, 2014

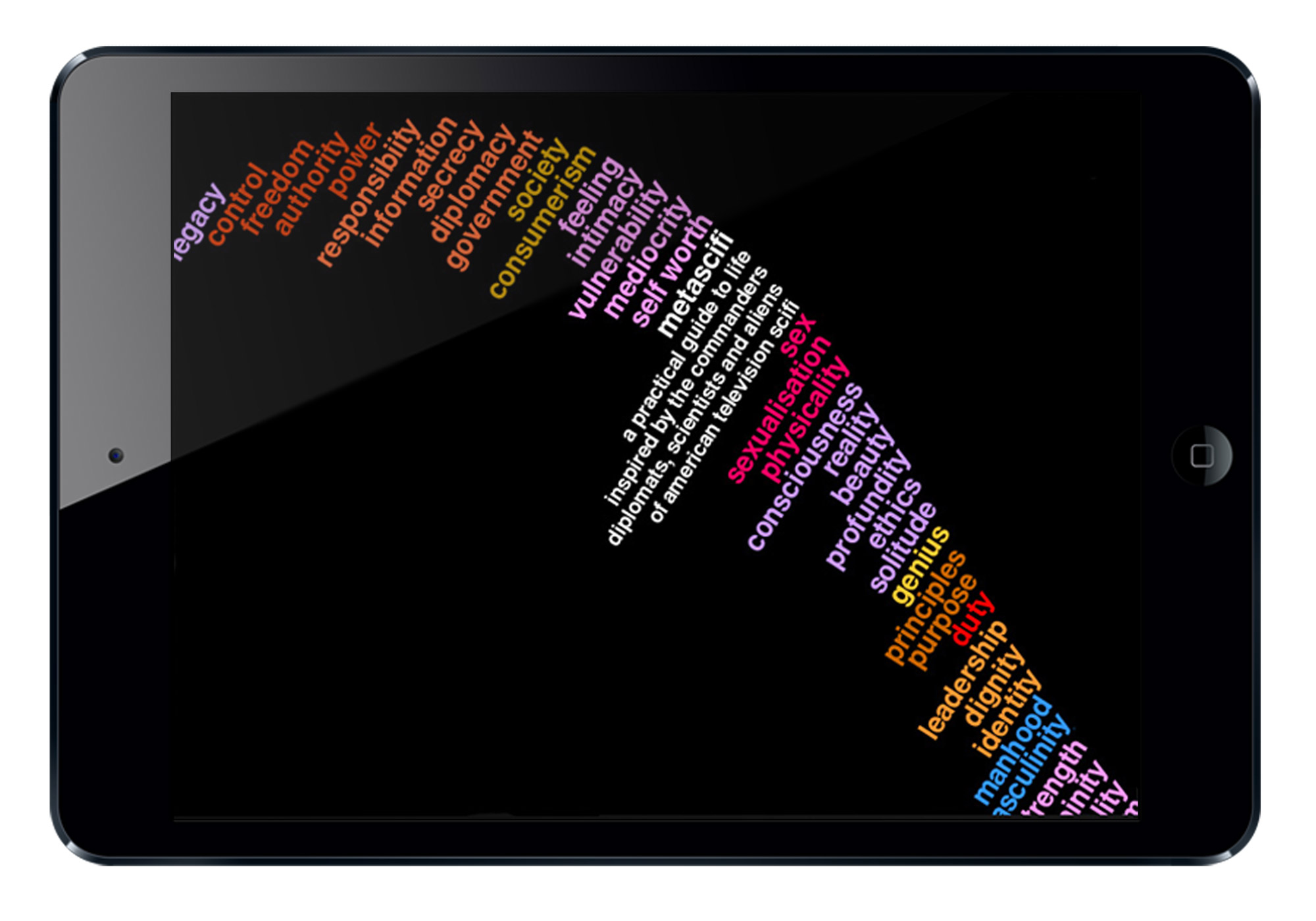
Home screen of Metascifi, iOS app, London UK, 2014

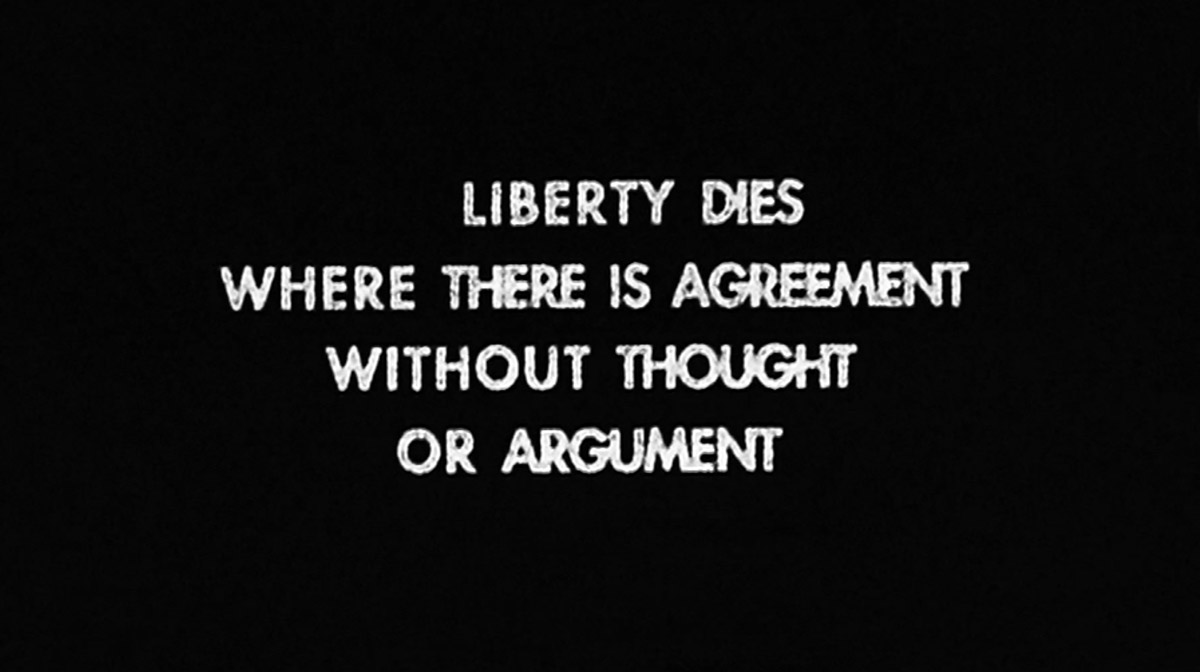
Liberty Dies Where There Is Agreement Without Thought or Argument from May 1968, Curzon Cinemas, London UK, 2008

== LGBT+ protest art ==
Firrell has been described as an activist, a campaigner and a benign propagandist. His work can be seen to deal with the imagination of activism and the creative expression of protest rather than the outcomes of protest per se.

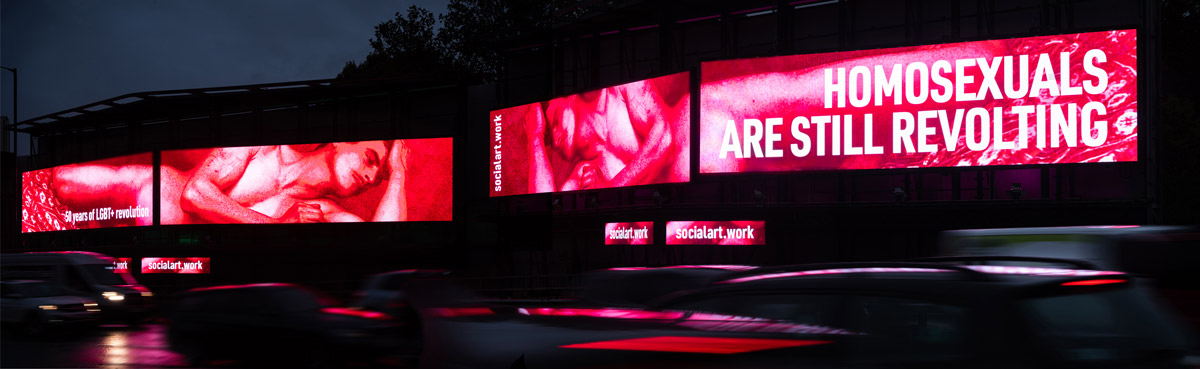
Homosexuals Are Still Revolting UK, 2020

Firrell's work has engaged with many protest movements but the qualitative aspect of protest, ‘the immense and vast beauty of justice’ in Firrell's own words, stands at the centre of the artist's preoccupations. Whilst the means and aesthetics may be very different, Firrell's works can be regarded as the logical descendants of paintings like Eugène Delacroix's Liberty Leading the People.

All Identity is Constructed appeared on UK digital billboards in 2016 examining the principle that all identities, regardless of their differences, are arbitrary constructions. Some may be less usual than others but all are similarly made-up.

Remember 1967 marked the 50th anniversary on 27 July 2017 of the UK Sexual Offences Act 1967. UK digital billboards were 'taken over' for the day, presenting again demands made originally by 1960s activists. Firrell was advised by human rights campaigner Peter Tatchell. Texts include "embrace lesbianism and overthrow the social order", "homosexuals and women are systematically oppressed by male supremacist society" and "overturn the ideology of hetero male supremacy". Remember 1967 is the first in a triptych of works marking significant 50th anniversaries in the LGBT+ equality movement.

Homosexuals Are Still Revolting marked 50 years since the founding of the Gay Liberation Front (GLF) in the UK and the beginning of the modern LGBT+ rights movement. The series consists of three large format digital billboards plus a special six-billboard installation. The artist's text is a play on a protest placard made by human rights campaigner (and former GLF member) Peter Tatchell for 1973's London Gay Pride.

Five Decades of Pride was created to commemorate on 1 July 2022 the 50th anniversary of the first Gay Pride march in the UK. Taking part in the original Pride march was political and risky - by effectively outing themselves, marchers could lose their jobs or their homes, or both. There were no equality laws, protected characteristics or safeguards. A person could be sacked or evicted simply for being gay. Firrell invited the LGBT+ community, activists and their allies to reflect on the most important issues facing the community in the 1970s, the 1980s, the 1990s, the 2000s and the 2010s. The five most important LGBT+ milestones were identified, one for each decade, and these became the subjects of the five artworks in the series.

=== 2016-2022 ===
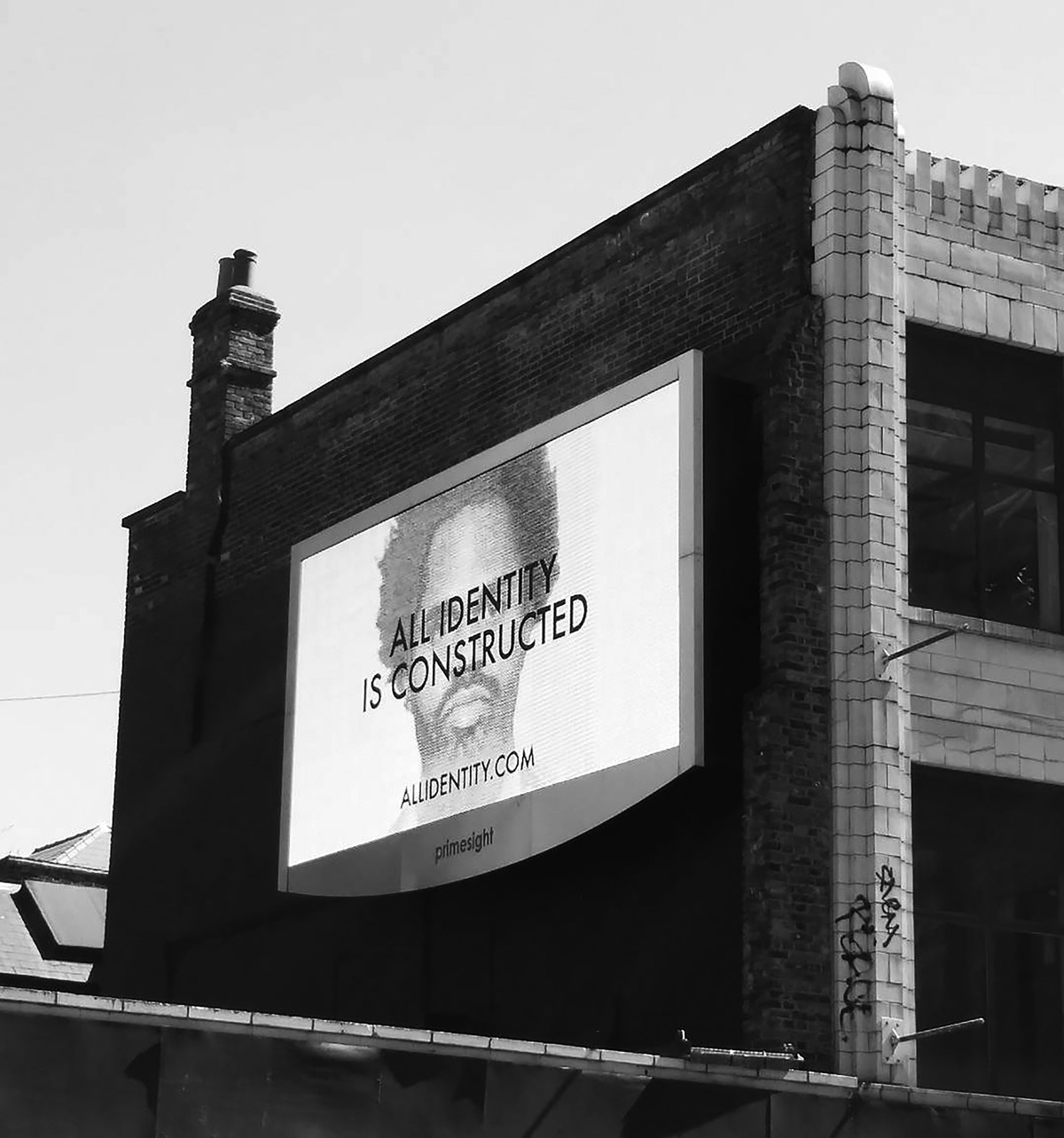
All Identity Is Constructed, UK-wide, 2016

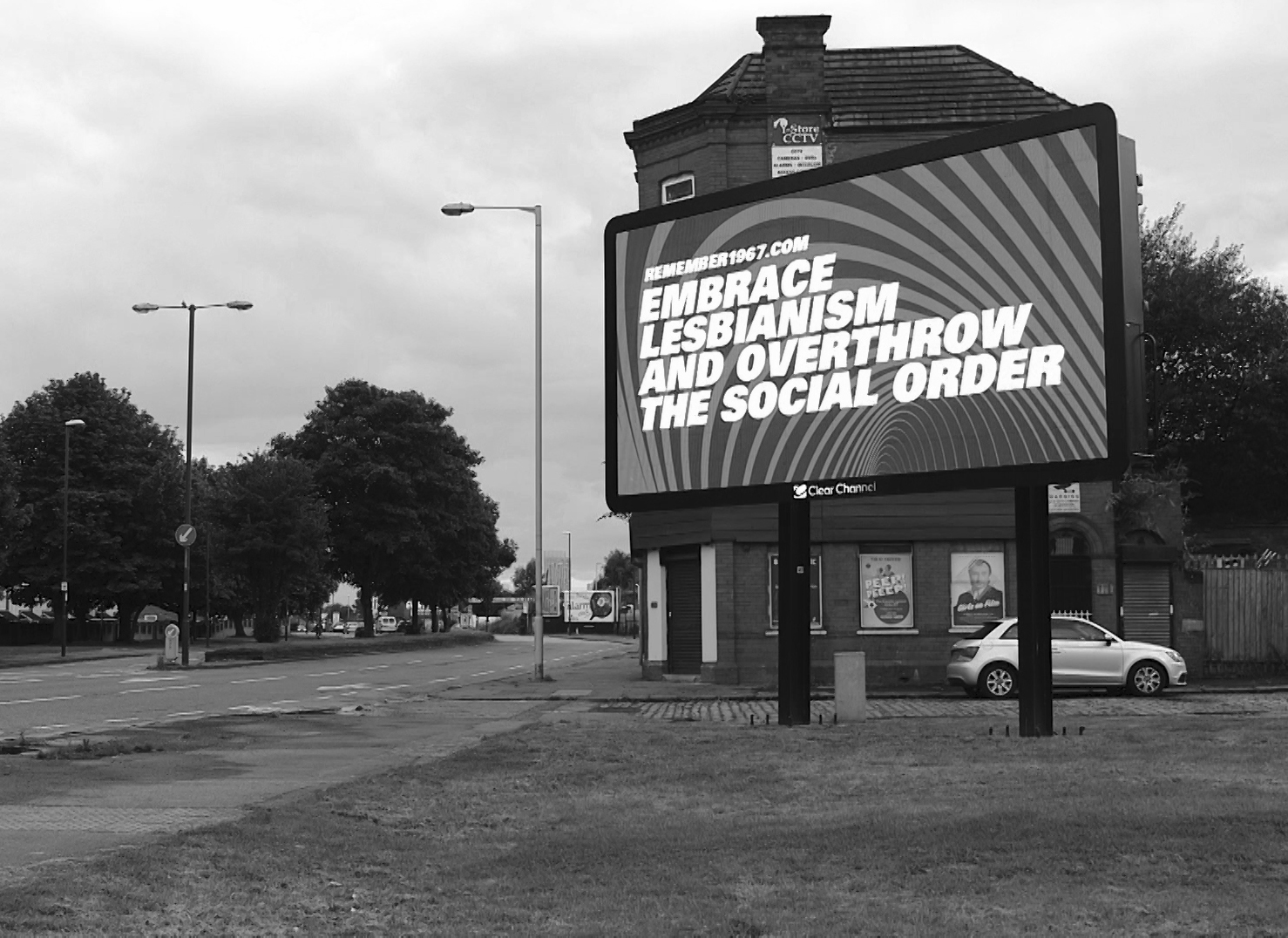
Embrace Lesbianism and Overthrow the Social Order from Remember 1967 for the 50th anniversary of the Sexual Offences Act 1967, UK-wide, 2017

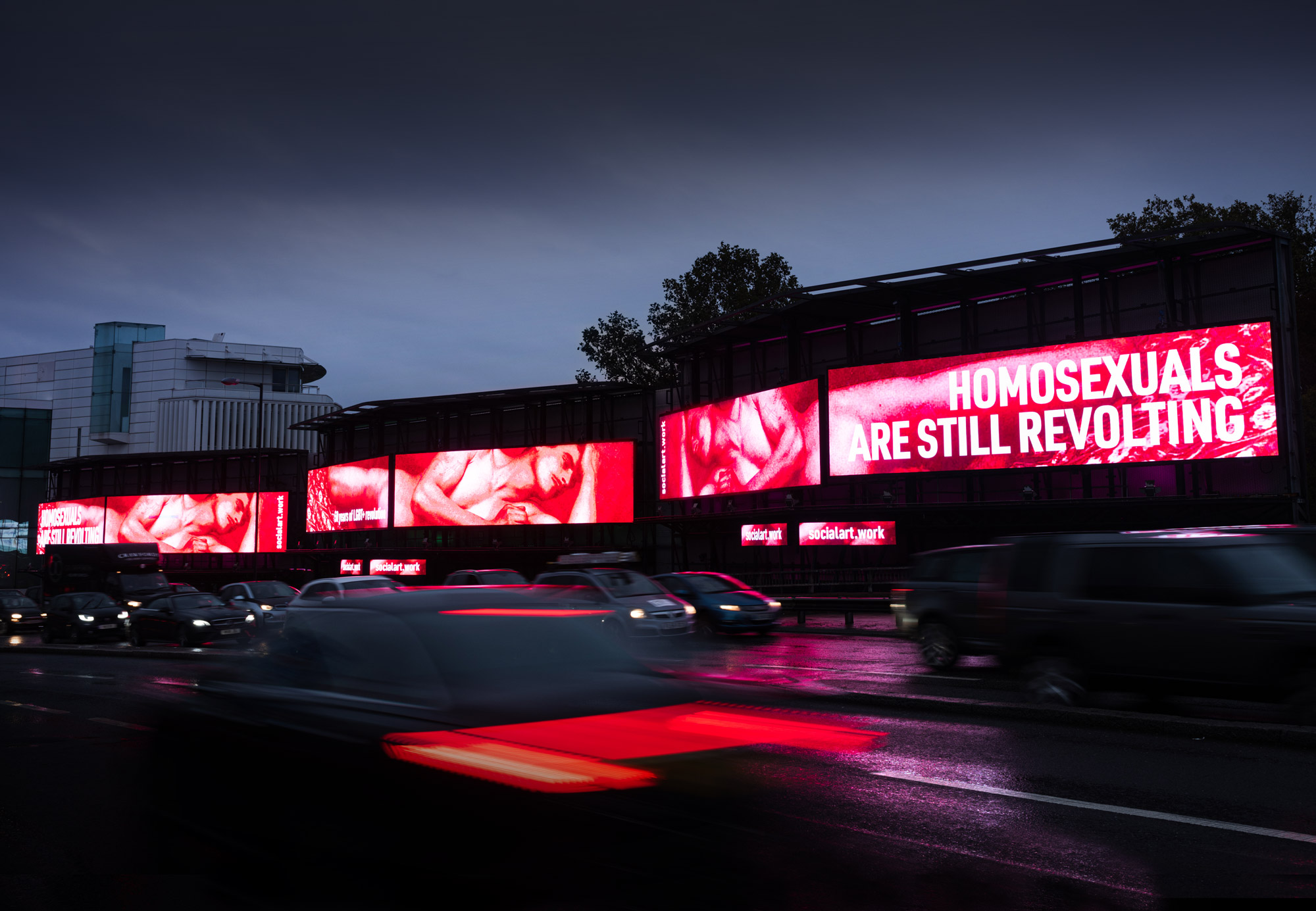
Homosexuals Are Still Revolting for the 50th anniversary of the Gay Liberation front in the UK, UK-wide, 2020

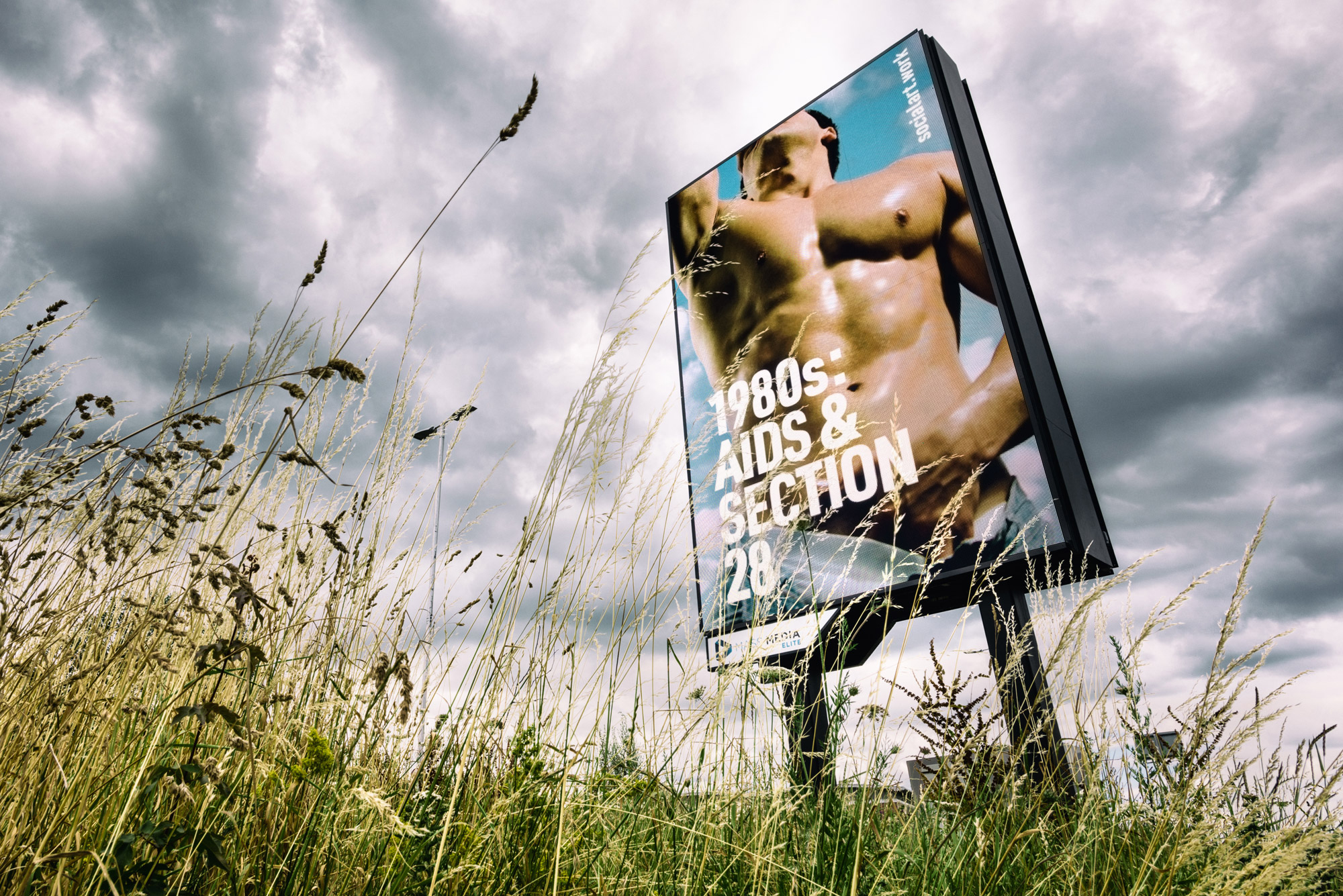
1980s: AIDS & Section 28 from Five Decades of Pride to mark the 50th anniversary of the first Gay Pride march in the UK, UK-wide, 2022

== Manipulated media ==
Firrell has created works by manipulating existing materials including newsprint and found footage. These works, loosely titled 'Bending the Straight', subvert materials such as public information films promoting obedience to societal norms, and explicitly anti LGBT+ propaganda.

Found footage titled Boys Beware (1961, Sid Davis Productions, USA) warns teenagers in America to beware of homosexuals because they are 'mentally ill' and will take advantage of young people. Firrell's re-edited version reverses the roles of the protagonists.

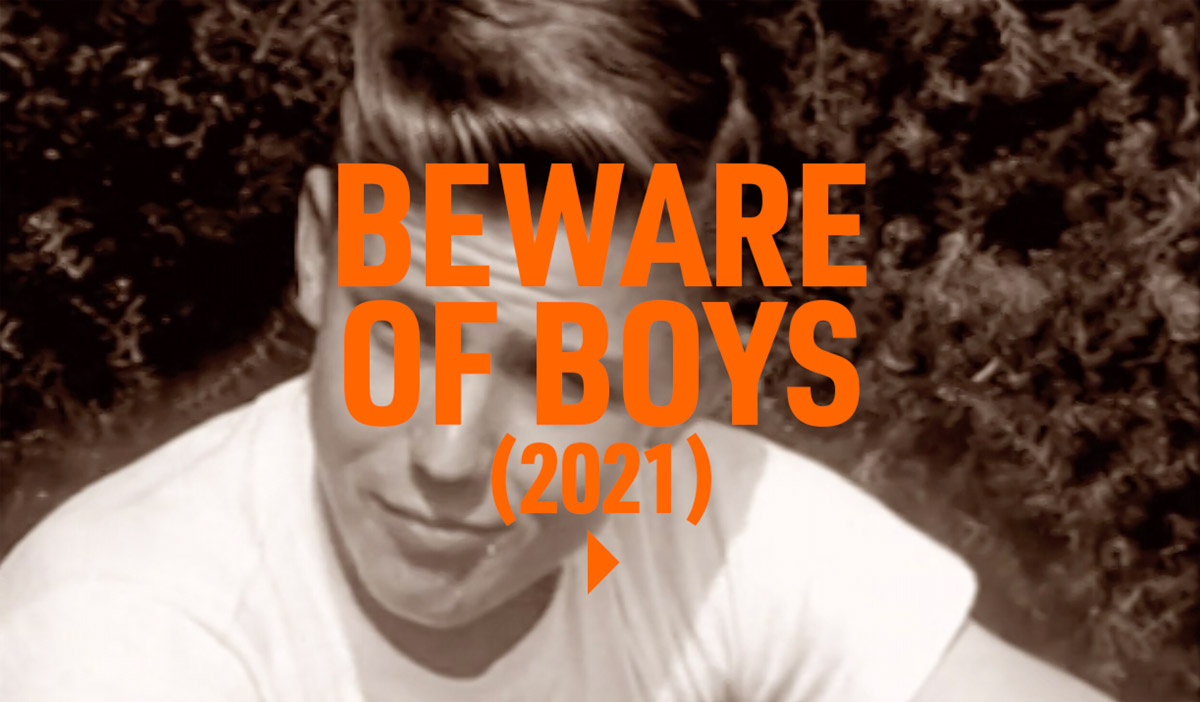
Beware of Boys, title frame, 2021

Now it is the young hitchhiker who is the sexual predator, taking advantage of a hapless older driver. The artist's version, re-titled Beware of Boys, satirises the ideas that underpin the original.

A 1947 public information film titled How To Be Popular suggests young people can enjoy social success by conforming to society's expectations of their gender roles and obeying parental authority. The artist reorganises the material to subvert the heteronormative assumptions promoted by the film's narration. The queering of the narrative frees the protagonists to choose a different path and make their own way in the world.

When radical feminist theorist Valerie Solanas shot Andy Warhol, the newspaper headline read Andy Warhol Shot by Actress, Cries 'He Controlled My Life'. The reporting fitted a pre-existing perception that Warhol was surrounded by colourful and unpredictable individuals. The newspaper headline didn't even refer to Solanas by name. Though she was abused, dismissed or ignored throughout her life, history has since recognised Solanas as one of the most important radical feminist theorists of the 20th Century. Firrell's reworked newsprint underscores this change in Solanas's status.

In Butt Shot, the artist repeats ad infinitum 15 frames of found footage of a young man rock climbing. In the artist's reworking of the material the 'gay male gaze' is evoked by focusing attention on the man's buttocks in close-fitting faded jeans. There is a straightforward feminist reading of this work; that women have been similarly objectified for years.

=== 2021-2025 ===
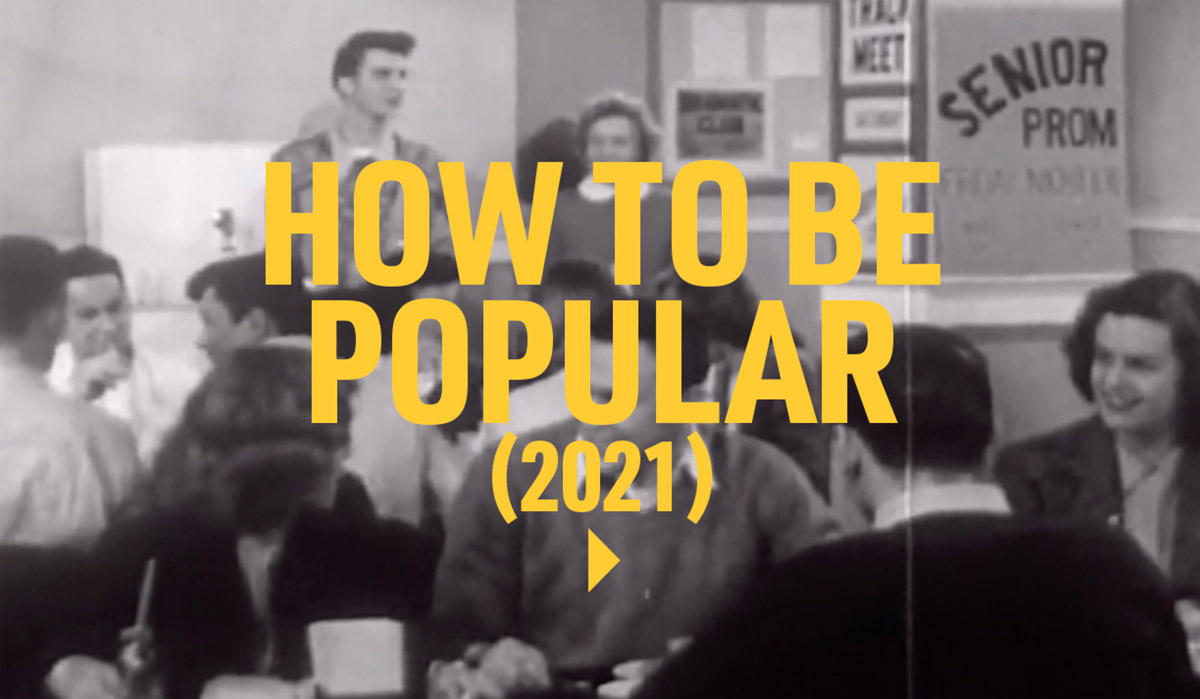
How To Be Popular, title frame, 2021

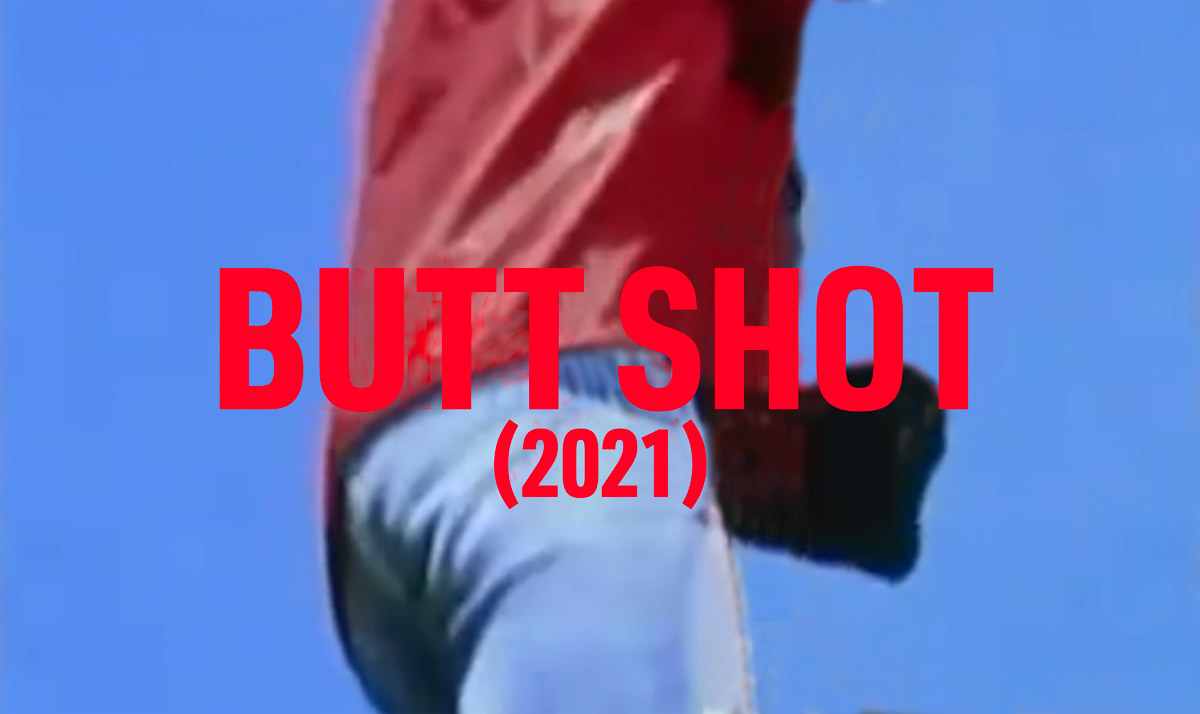
Butt Shot, title frame, 2025

== Co-opting commercial billboards ==
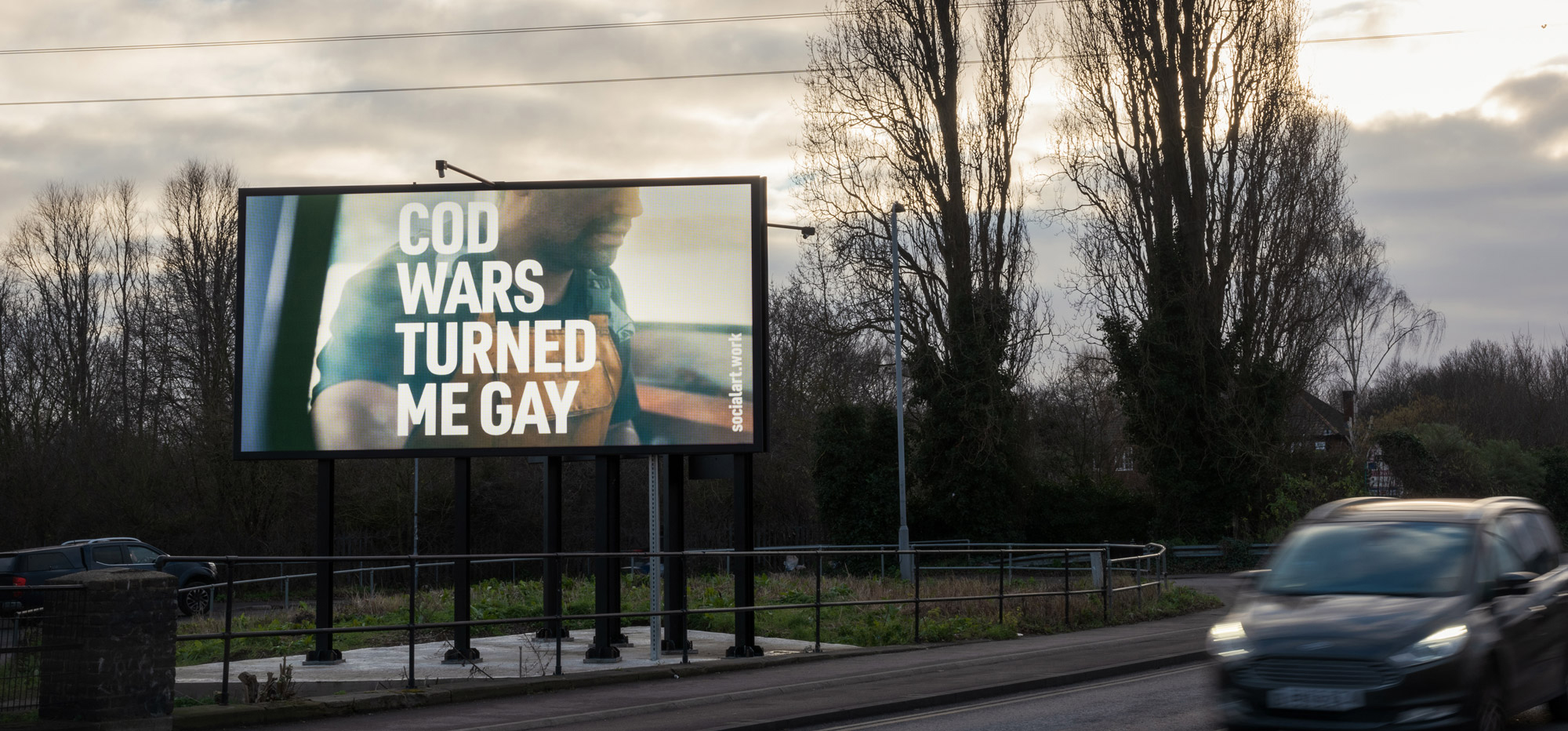
Cod Wars Turned Me Gay for the 50th anniversary of the first Gay Pride march in the UK, 2020

From 2017 onwards, Firrell adopted the commercial billboard as the expressive form central to his public art practice. The key elements of Firrell's art making in the medium have become readily identifiable over time. His billboards resemble advertising because they deploy the strategies customarily used by commercial art directors and copywriters (Firrell started his career as an advertising copywriter in 1982). Headlines are declarative and short. In later works, the typeface is uniformly DIN 1451. Noted for its simplicity and clarity, DIN 1451 is the typeface used for German road signs and mirrors the artist's declarative use of language.

In The Art of Protest (Gestalten, Berlin 2021) Penny Rafferty writes that Firrell offers up 'uncanny socially engaged texts that mimic traditional advertising language and imagery’. In her estimation, ‘Firrell's work provides public-space poetics that stay with the viewer as they walk down the street or get off the bus. These moments of interruption are both surreal and multilayered. Firrell does not offer a solution to these political problems but, instead, he opens up an inner dialogue with the viewer for them to muse over their own understanding and their own solution.’

Cod Wars Turned Me Gay is typical of the artist's mature work. It looks like advertising. The text dominates the other formal elements, in this case an anonymised trawlerman who acts as illustration to the text rather than a comment on it. The artwork is also paradigmatic in ways which are not immediately obvious. It was created to mark the 50th anniversary year of the UK's first Gay Pride March in 1972. The artist's research identified other significant events in the UK in that year including the so called Cod Wars - disputes about fishing rights between the UK and Iceland. Cod Wars Turned Me Gay tells the true-life story of one teenager's realisation of his gay identity. Scenes on TV of burly trawlermen in conflict over fishing rights triggered a homoerotic awakening. At the same time, the artwork gently satirises the view, prevalent in the early 1970s, that people could 'catch' or 'be turned' LGBT+.

The American art critic Daniel Gauss characterised Firrell's use of text as "direct engagement that rejects the need for any analysis. Firrell is convinced that by using language he can meaningfully engage others in constructive dialogues to make the world more humane".

== Serialism ==
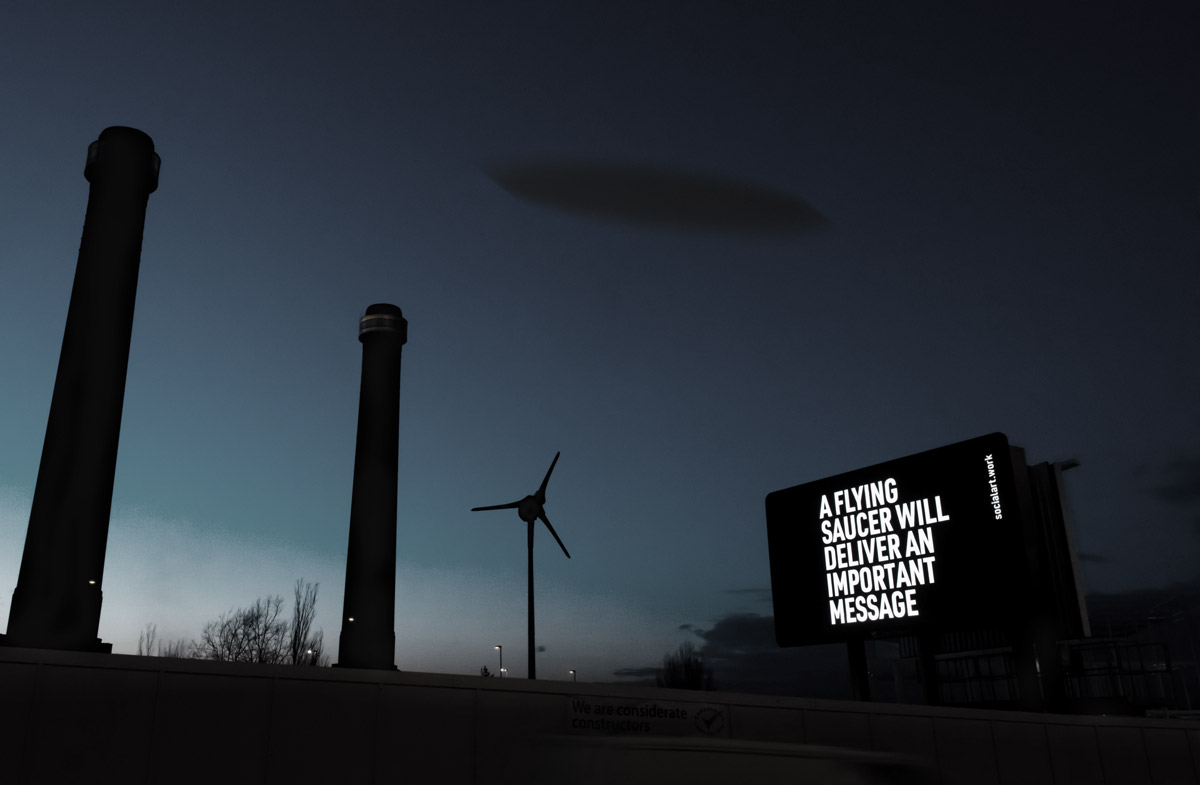
A Flying Saucer Will Deliver an Important Message from Counter Culture Rising, a series of 12 linked billboards displayed UK-wide, 2020

Firrell began experimenting with serialism in 2018, supported by Clear Channel UK. The 12 billboards of Counter Culture Rising convey a single cinematic narrative of alien visitation, warnings about ecological catastrophe and war, the threat posed by machine intelligence, the political significance of living peacefully and the promise of advanced states of consciousness. The series revisits the ideology of the global counterculture of the 1960s.

War Is Always a Failure quotes visually from a 1967 counterculture button badge from the Labadie Collection at the University of Michigan. Firrell's artwork re-expresses the anti-militarist position that war is both immoral and ineffective because, historically, it has proven a poor producer of lasting regime change.

Living Peacefully Is a Radical Political Position echoes the more colourful ‘bombing for peace is like fucking for virginity’ (anti-vietnam war placard, 1969).

A recipe for ‘haschich fudge’ appears in the Alice B. Toklas Cook Book first published in 1954. Because of the cook book's success and this particular recipe's infamy, Alice. B. Toklas’ name became synonymous with, and slang for, marijuana. Firrell has said, ’I was born in Paris all over again when I discovered 27 Rue de Fleurus and the extraordinary lives and work of Gertrude Stein and Alice B. Toklas.' I Love You Alice B. Toklas has been read as a tribute from Firrell to Toklas and Stein – the public repayment of a private debt – for the inspiration of lives and works made regardless of the judgement of others.

=== Counter Culture Rising, 2020 ===
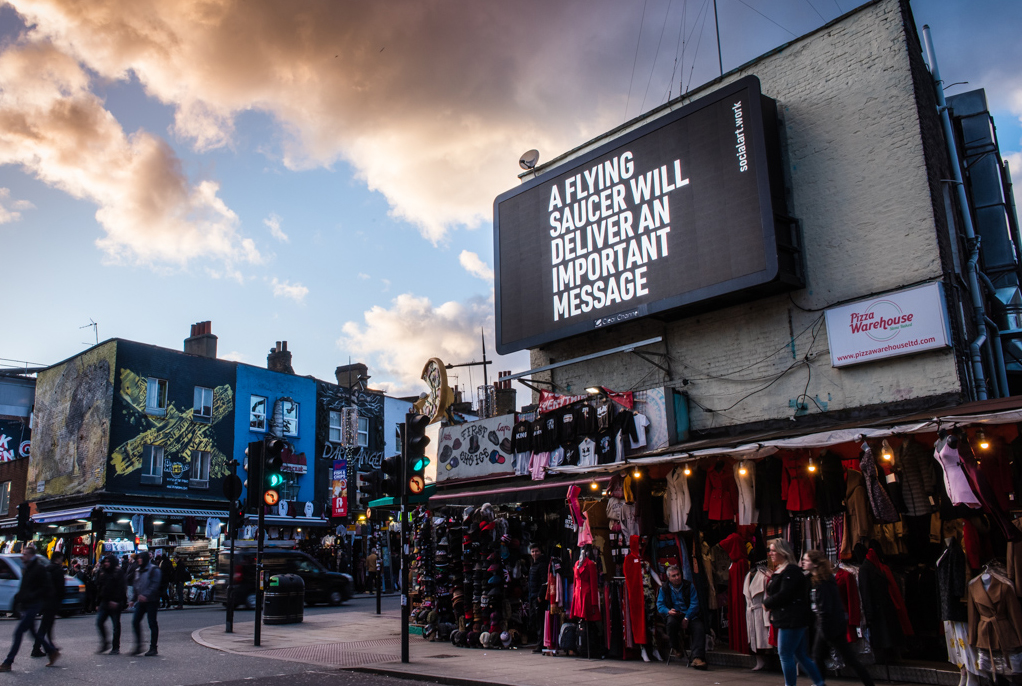
A Flying Saucer Will Deliver an Important Message from Counter Culture Rising, UK-wide, 2020

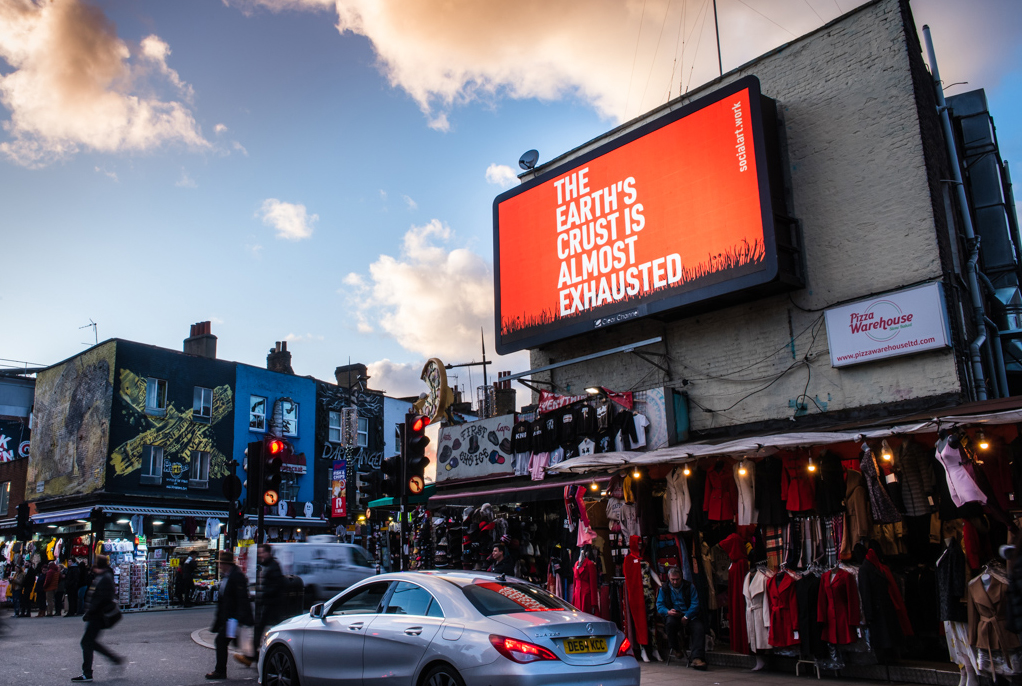
The Earth's Crust Is Almost Exhausted from Counter Culture Rising, UK-wide, 2020

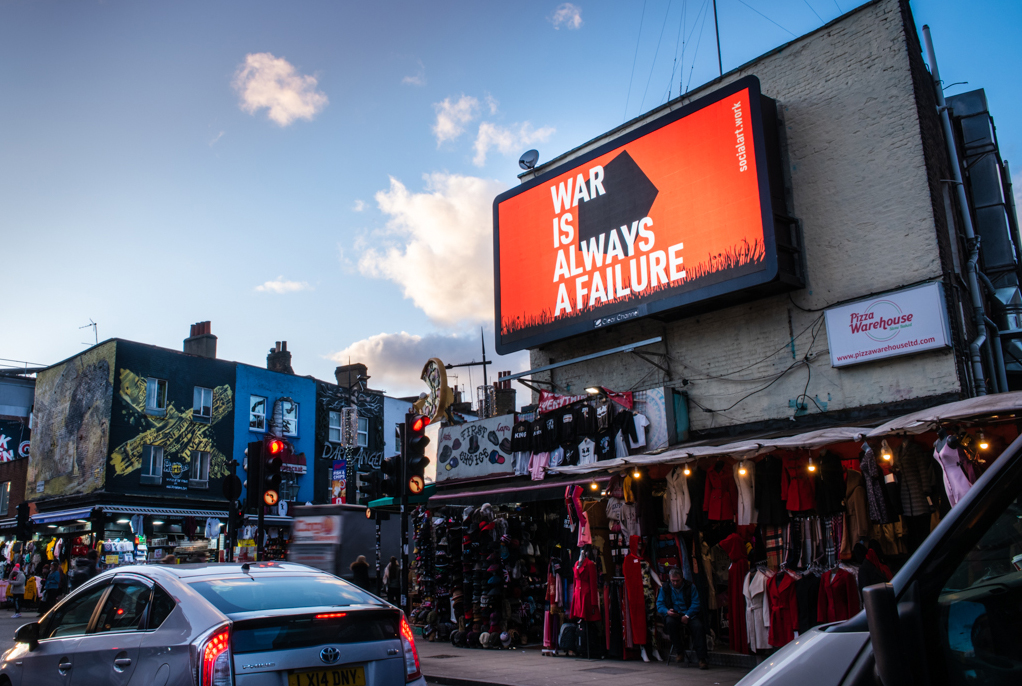
War Is Always a Failure from Counter Culture Rising, UK-wide, 2020

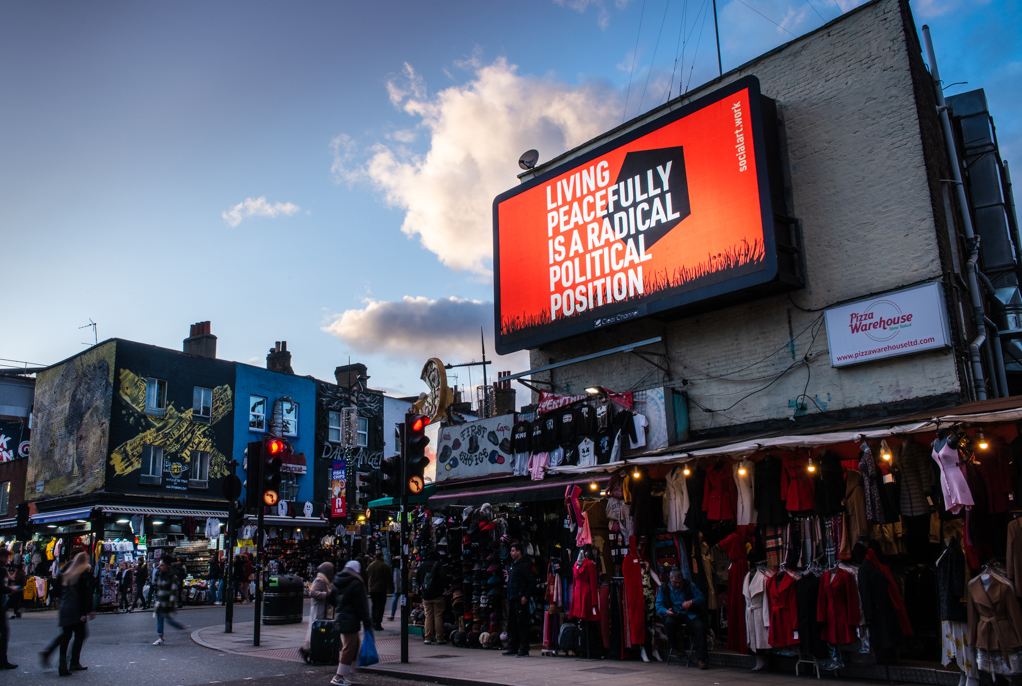
Living Peacefully Is a Radical Political Position from Counter Culture Rising, UK-wide, 2020

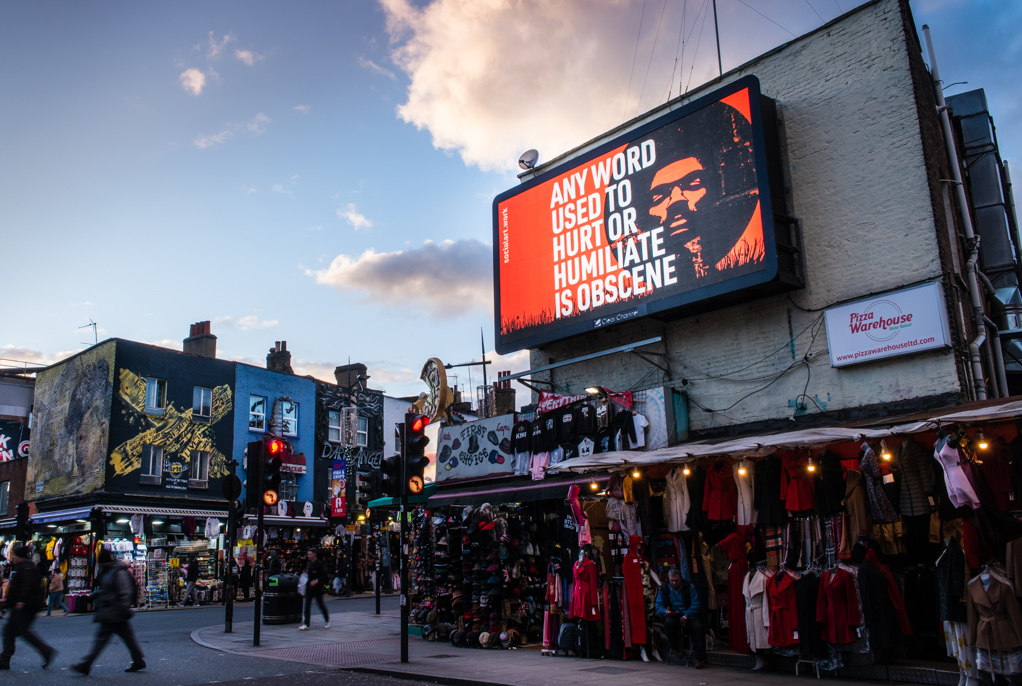
Any Word Used To Hurt or Humiliate Is Obscene from Counter Culture Rising, UK-wide, 2020

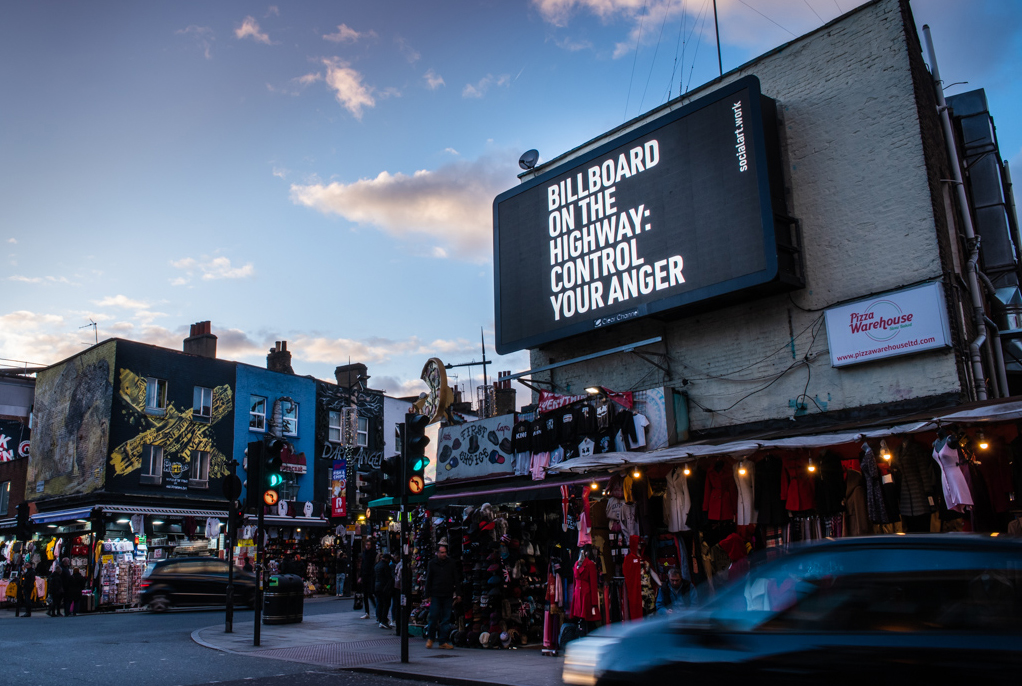
Billboard on the Highway: Control Your Anger from Counter Culture Rising, UK-wide, 2020

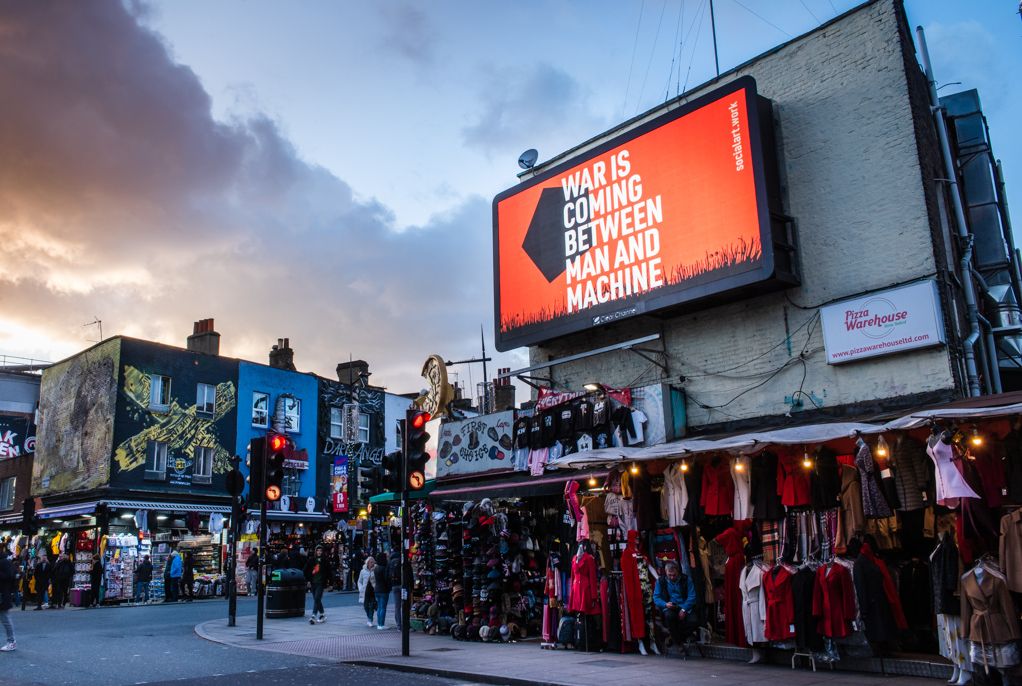
War Is Coming Between Man and Machine from Counter Culture Rising, UK-wide, 2020

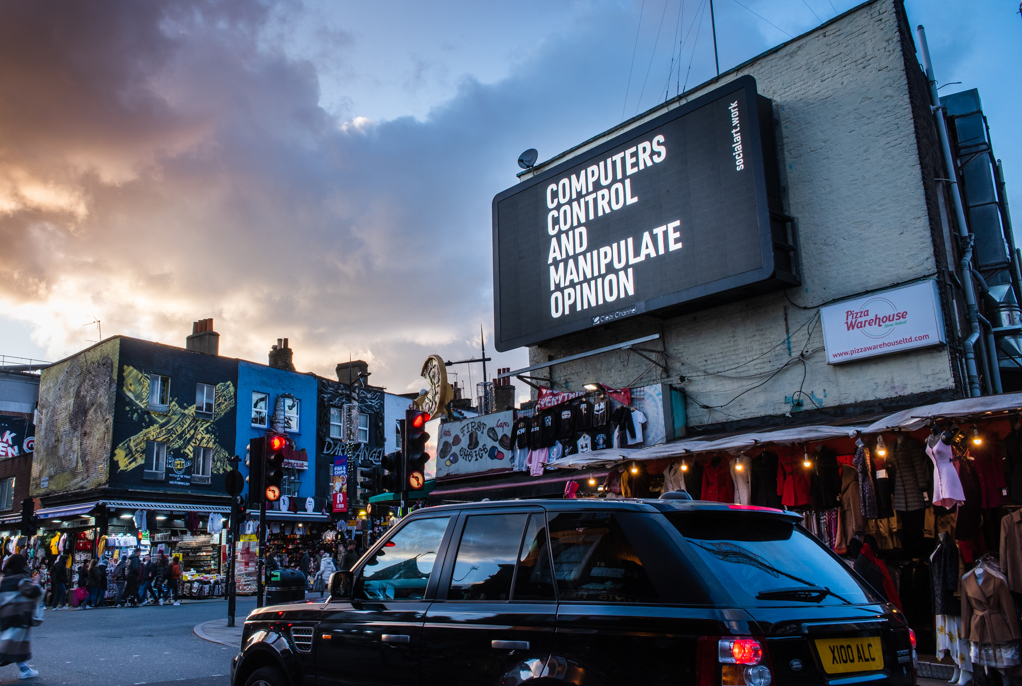
Computers Control and Manipulate Opinion from Counter Culture Rising, UK-wide, 2020

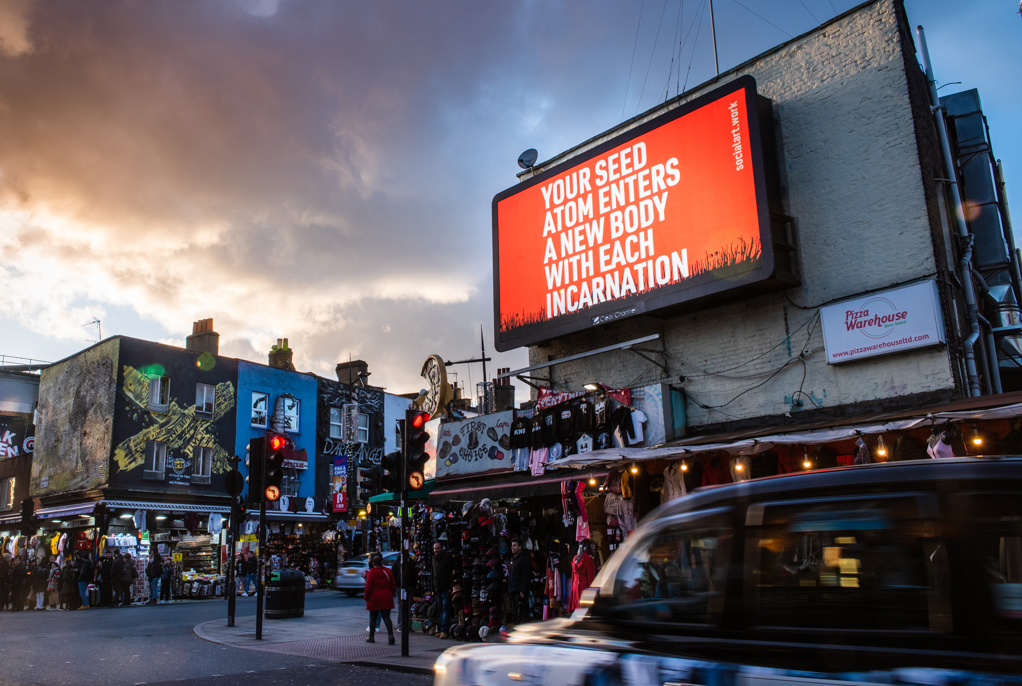
Your Seed Atom Enters a New Body with Each Incarnation from Counter Culture Rising, UK-wide, 2020

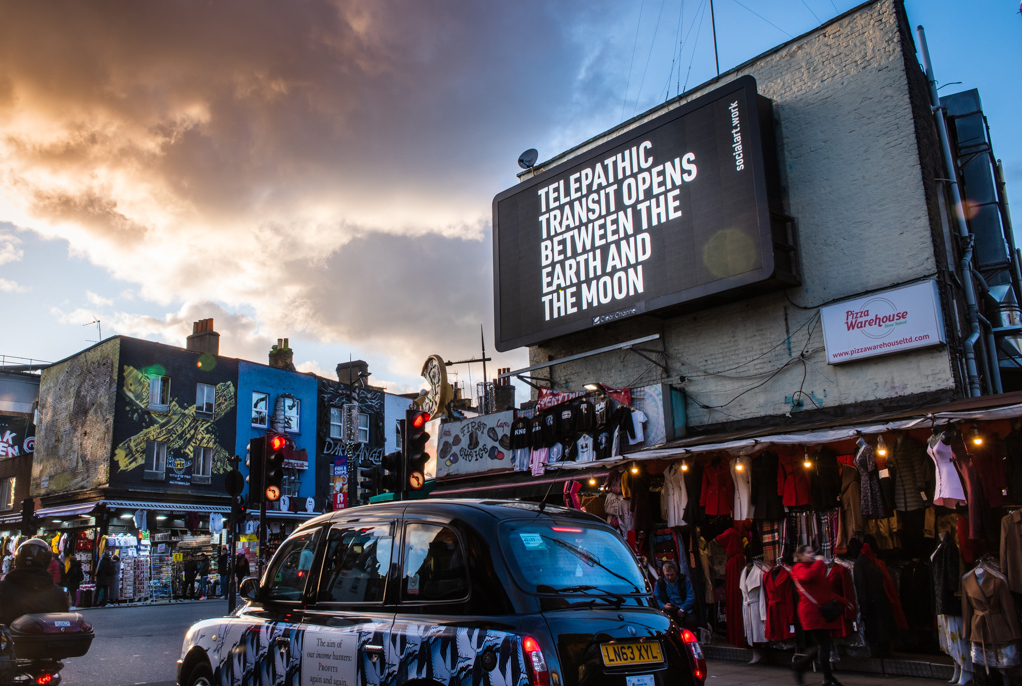
Telepathic Transit Opens Between the Earth and the Moon from Counter Culture Rising, UK-wide, 2020

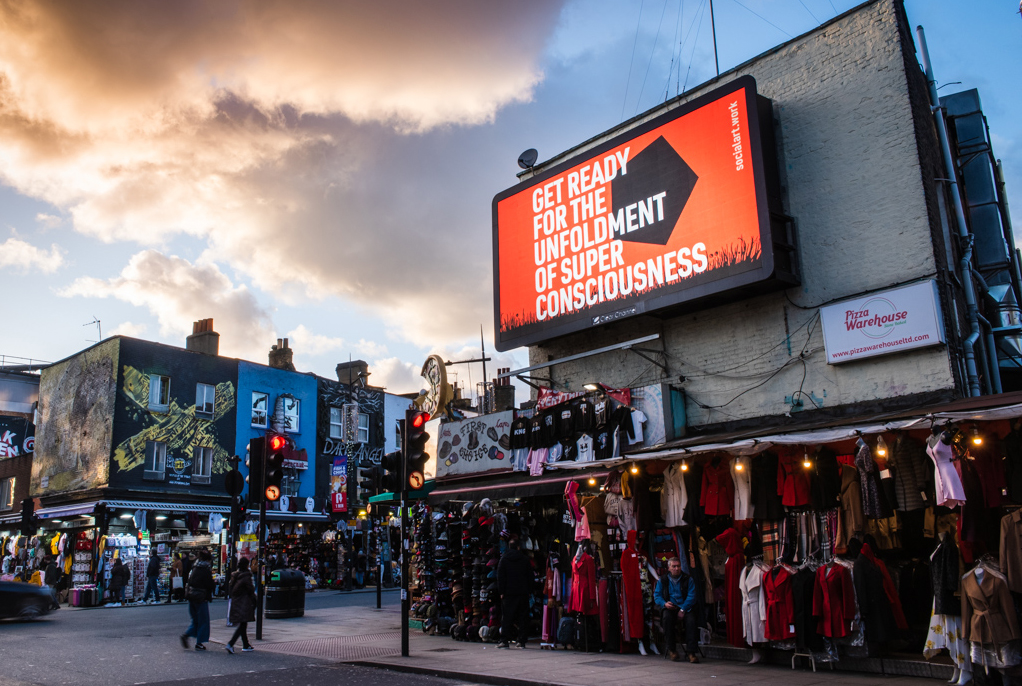
Get Ready for the Unfoldment of Super Consciousness from Counter Culture Rising, UK-wide, 2020

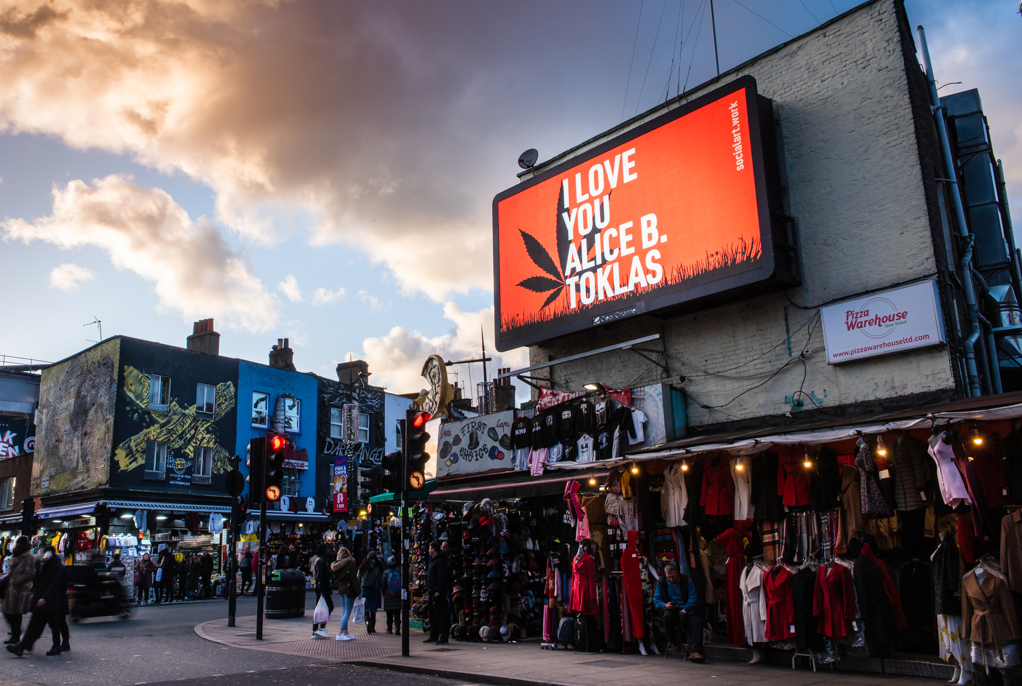
I Love You Alice B. Toklas from Counter Culture Rising, UK-wide, 2020

== Controversy ==
Several lines of critical enquiry point to a subtle yet deliberate inflammatory quality in many of the artist's works; these works are designed to add fuel to the fire of debate and it is in the debate that the art actually resides – it is what is thought or said later as a consequence that 'completes' the artwork.

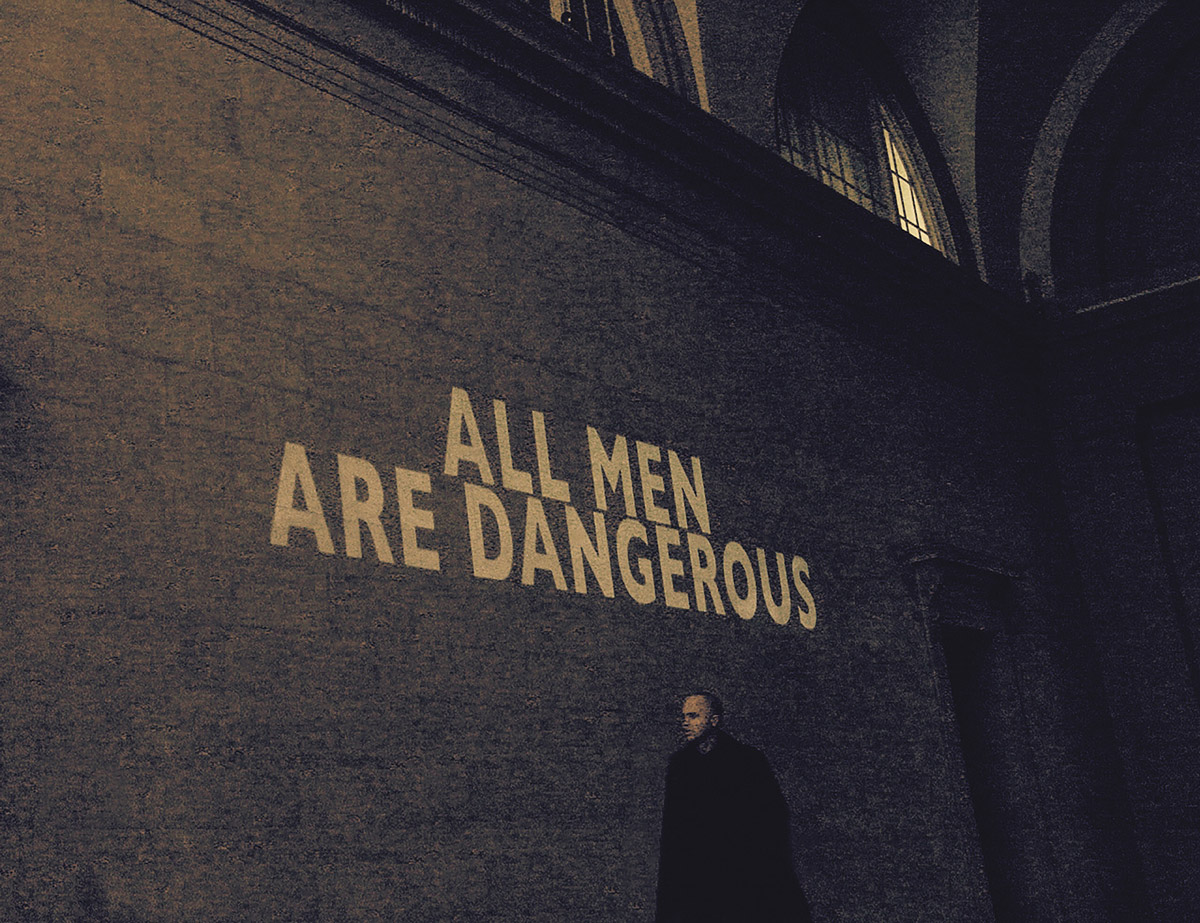
All Men Are Dangerous Tate Britain, London UK, 2006

Firrell has said, ‘If you can raise debate, eventually change will follow. What is hidden or unspoken will never be understood or embraced. Visibility and debate are the engines of social progress.'

When All Men Are Dangerous appeared on billboards across the UK, the artwork revealed a pre-existing sentiment in some quarters that the male gender itself is under siege. The liberalisation of society and the advent of greater equality has also created a great deal of ‘turbulence’ in social attitudes. Society may be fairer but it is also more complex and potentially more disorienting.

Certain groups were quick to ridicule Firrell's work Socialism Is a Moral Idea created in conversation with Clare Short. Words and commentary were added to the artwork – Socialism Is a Moral Idea was vandalised to read, ‘socialism is a really bad idea’. Several familiar tropes were aired including conflating socialism with the political repression of the former Soviet Union.

=== 2019-2022 ===
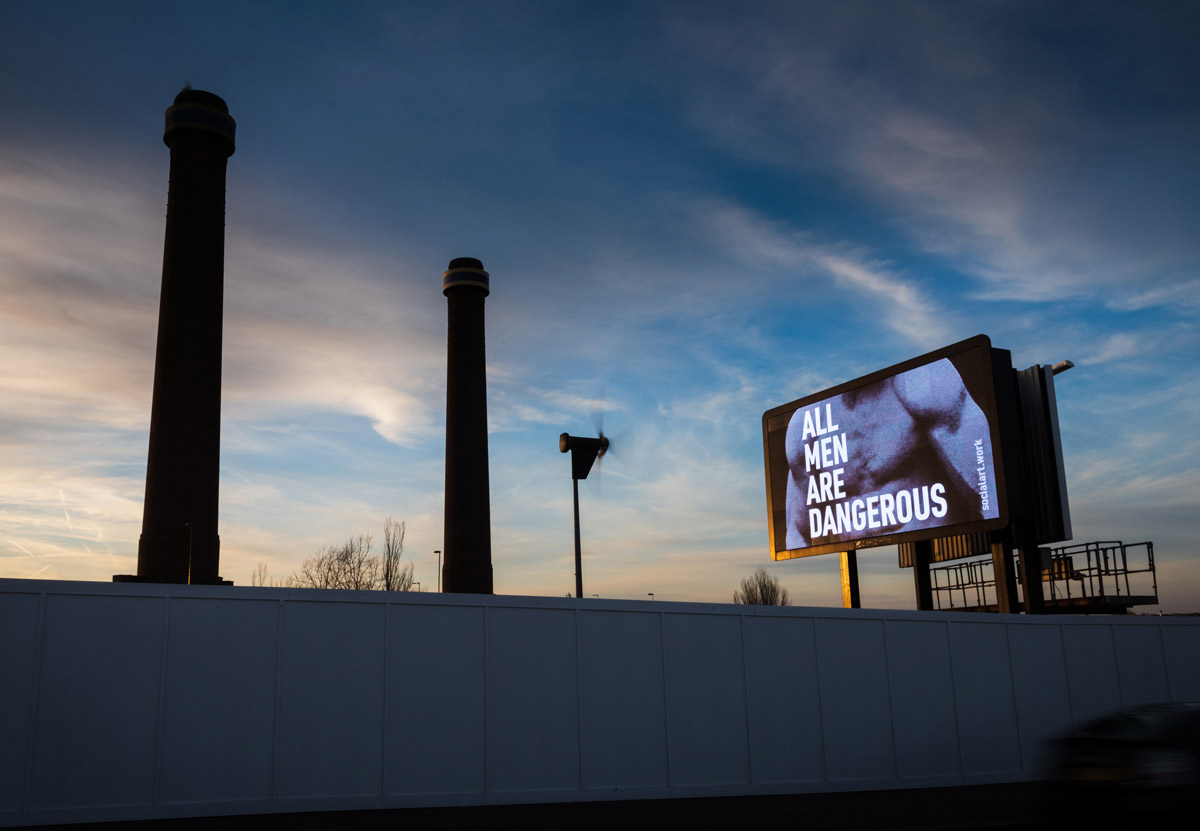
All Men Are Dangerous UK-wide, 2019

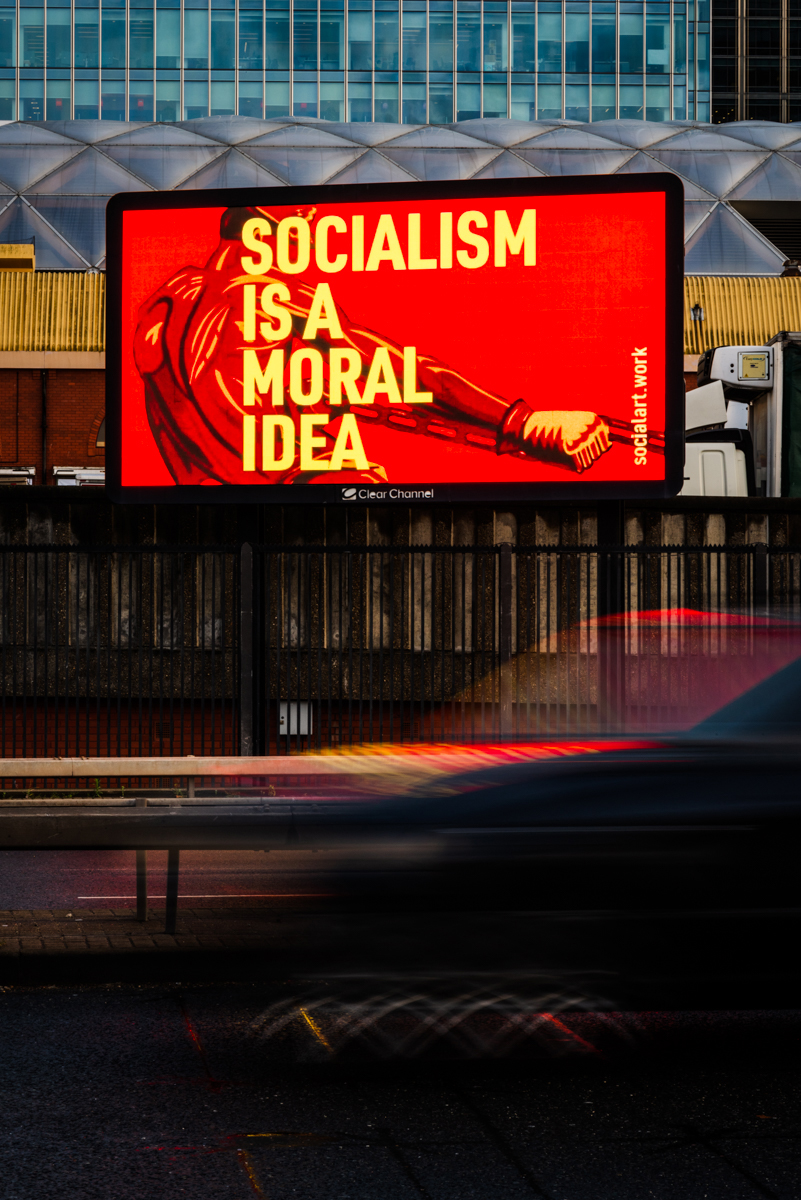
Socialism Is a Moral Idea with Clare Short, UK-wide 2019

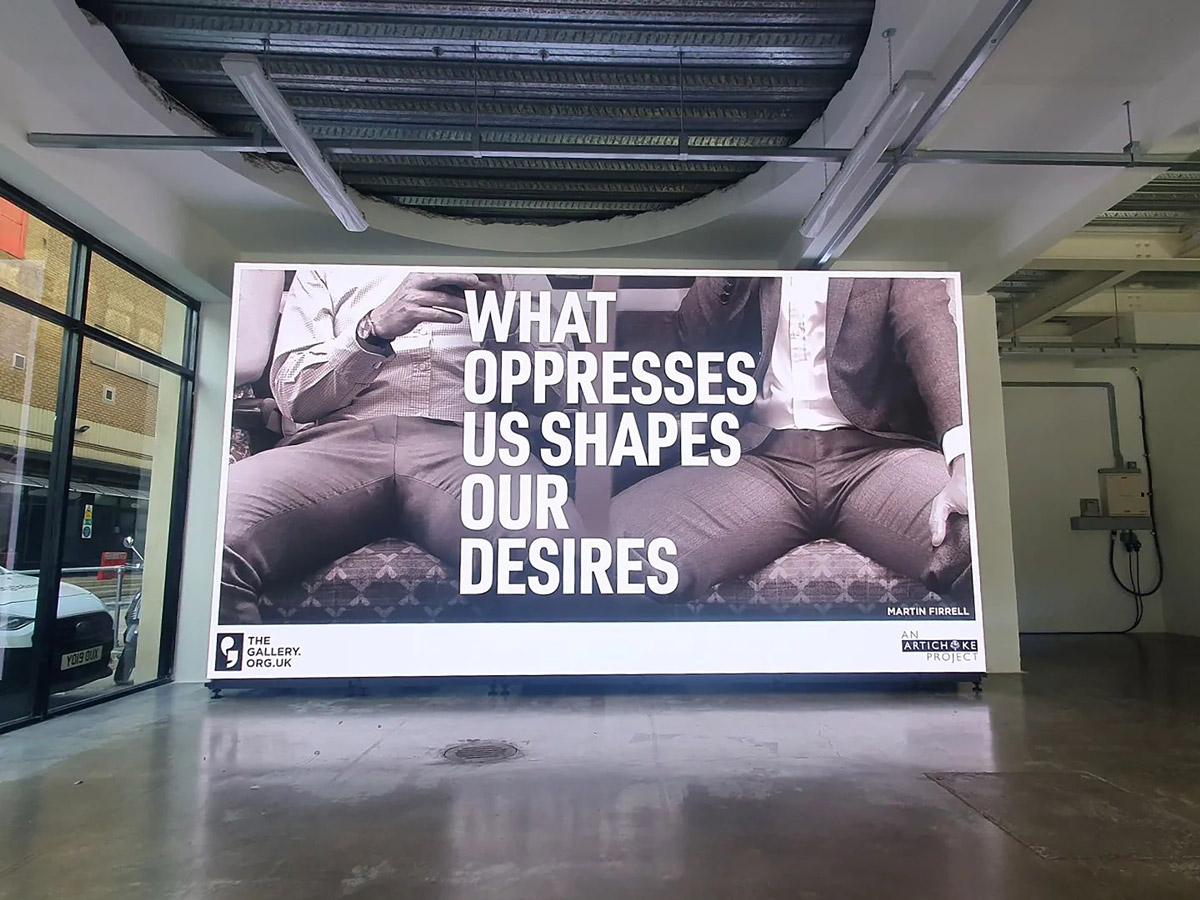
What Oppresses Us Shapes Our Desires, UK-wide, 2022

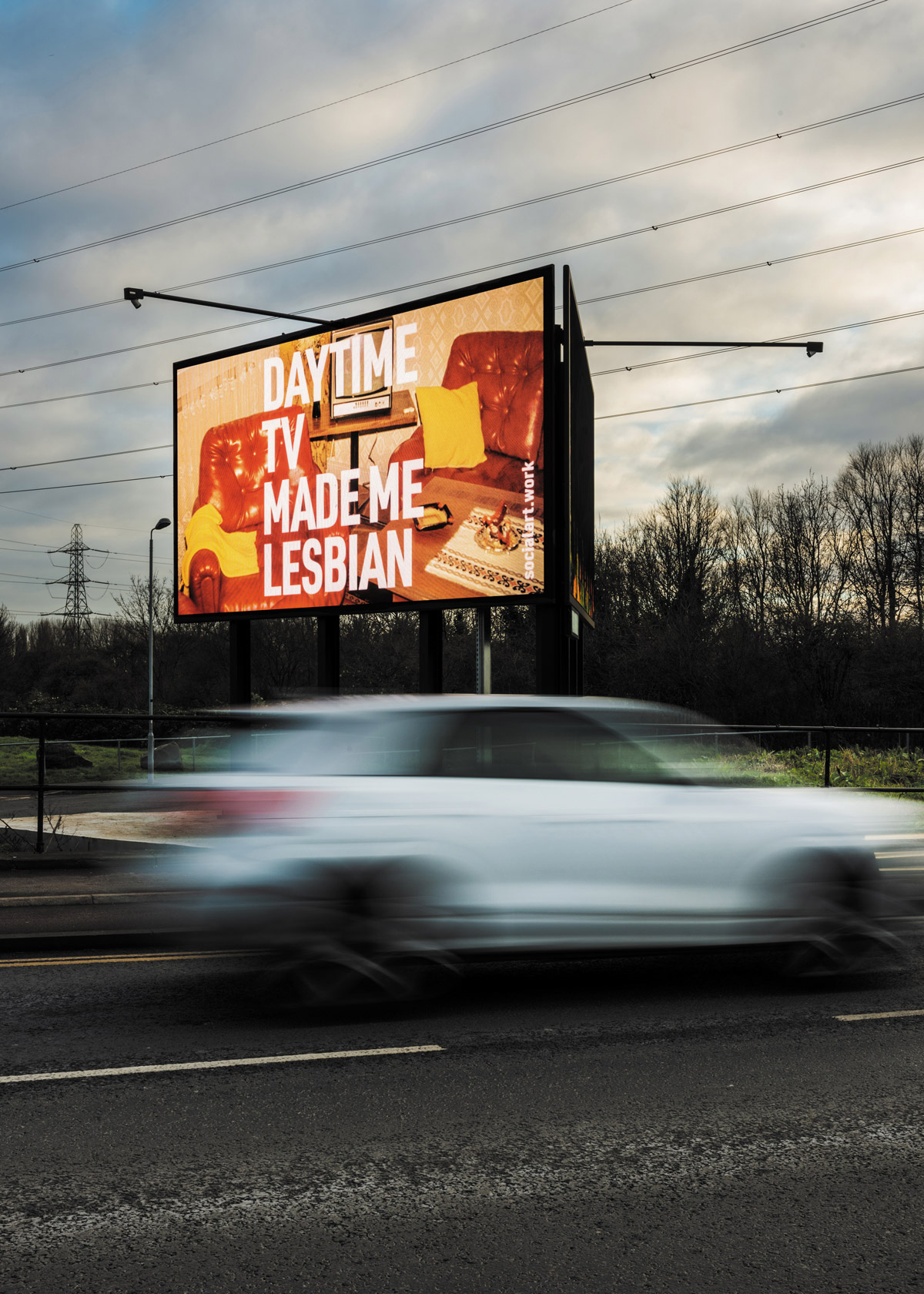
Daytime TV Made Me Lesbian, UK-wide, 2022

== Internationalism ==
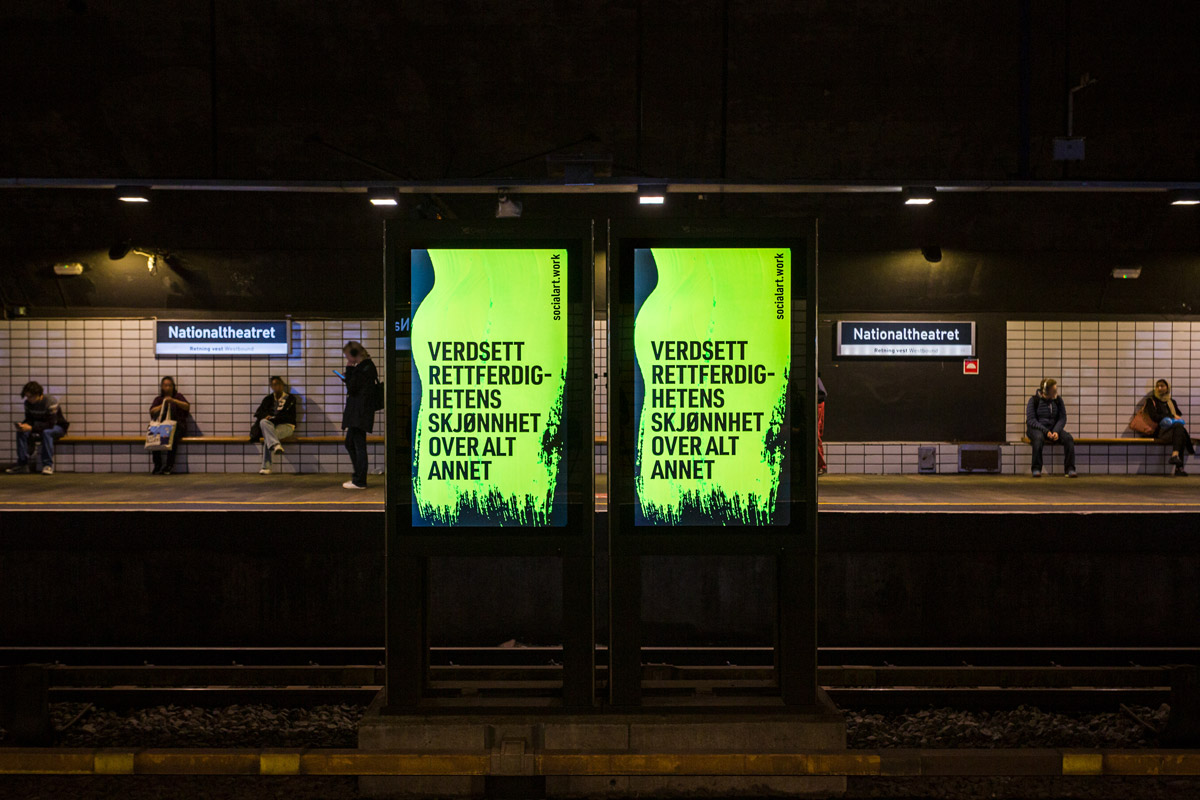
'Verdsett Rettferdighetens Skjønnhet Over Alt Annet (Prize the Beauty of Justice Above All Else)' by Martin Firrell, Oslo Norway 2023

Firrell has addressed publics across the world, usually in translation initiated by the artist and supported by native-speaking poets. His works have appeared in response to pertinent national events (like the 100th anniversary of Surrealism in Belgium) and across nations to mark international progress on rights and equalities (International Women's Day for example, or as part of Pride celebrations across Europe).

Language plays a more complex role in these international contexts. Firrell's The Chromatika / Die Chromatika, inspired by Goethe's colour theory and the writings on colour by Rudolf Steiner, appeared in both German and English language versions. Die Chromatika attempts to provide an absolute psychological definition of each of the spectral colours – an elaborate chromatic joke made more compelling by the use of German and its presumed precision as the language of science.

=== 2010-2025 ===
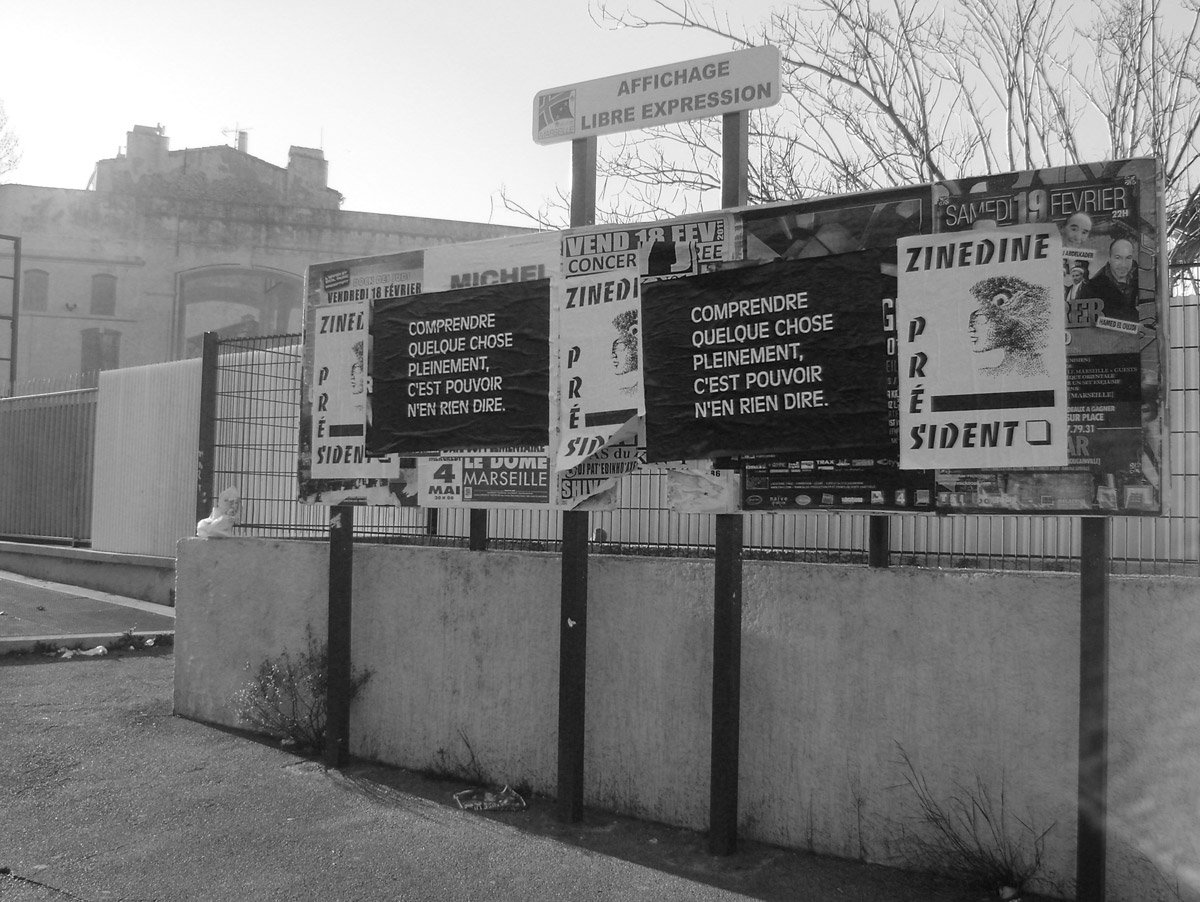
Comprendre quelque chose pleinement, c'est pouvoir n'en rein dire (To Understand a Thing Fully Is To Be Able To Say Nothing about It) Marseille, France 2010

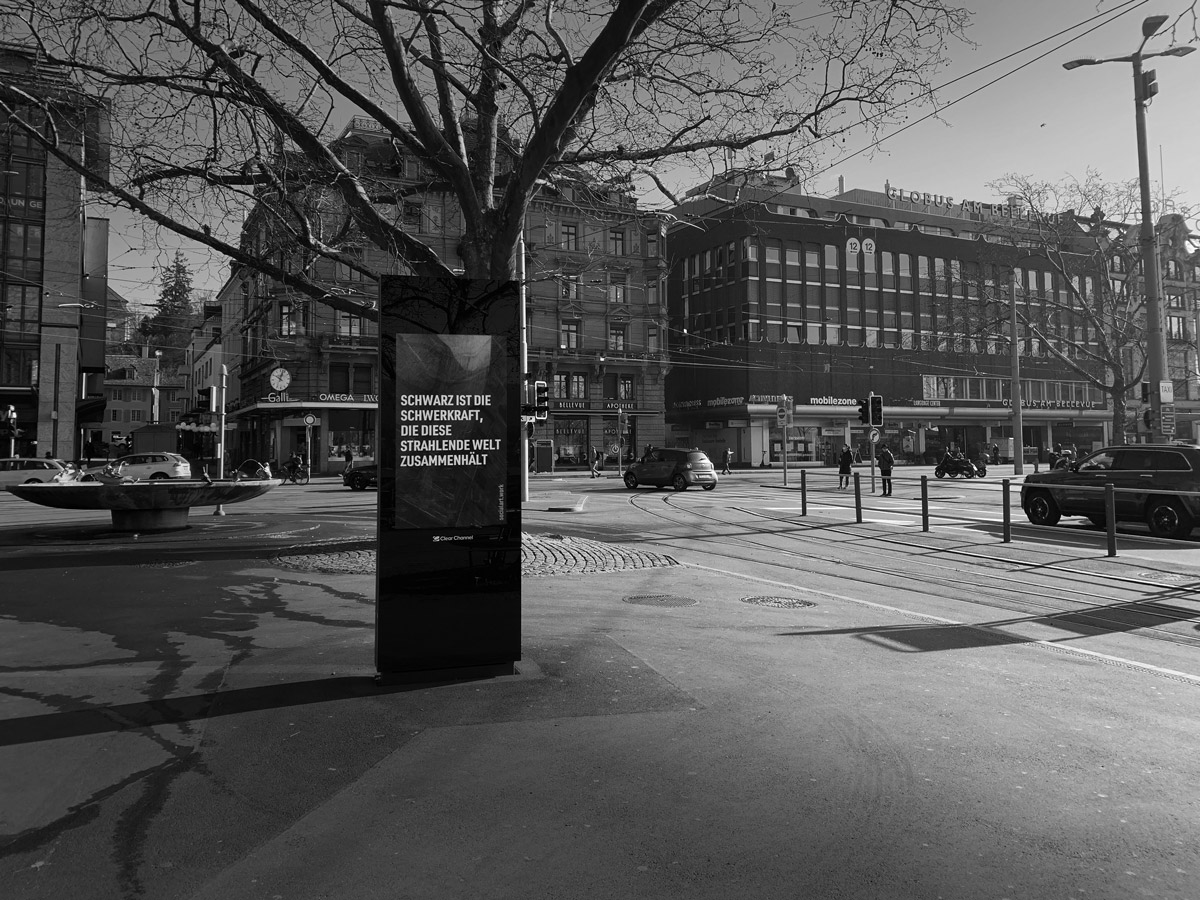
Schwarz Ist Die Schwerkraft, Die Diese Strahlende Welt Zusammenhält (Black Is the Gravity that Tethers the Luminous World) from Die Chromatika, Zurich, Switzerland, 2022

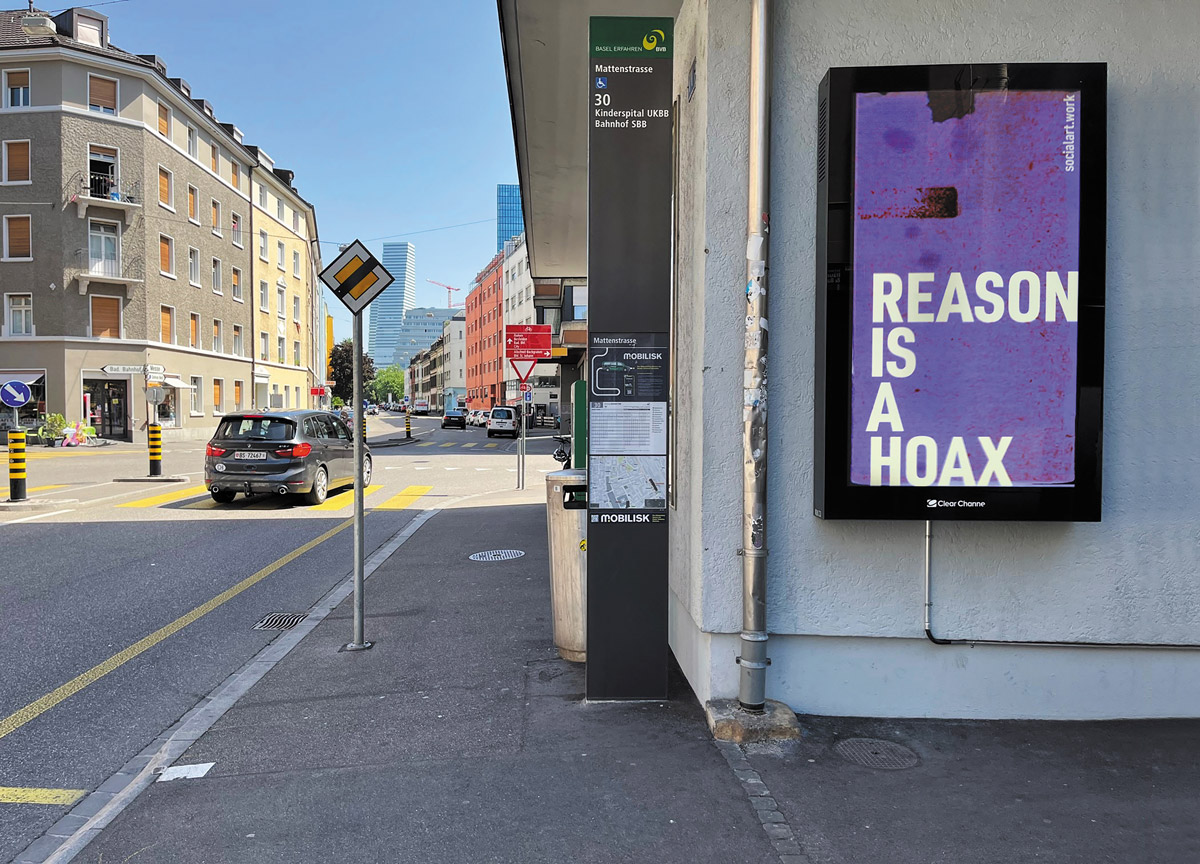
Reason Is A Hoax from Dada 105, Basel, Switzerland, 2022

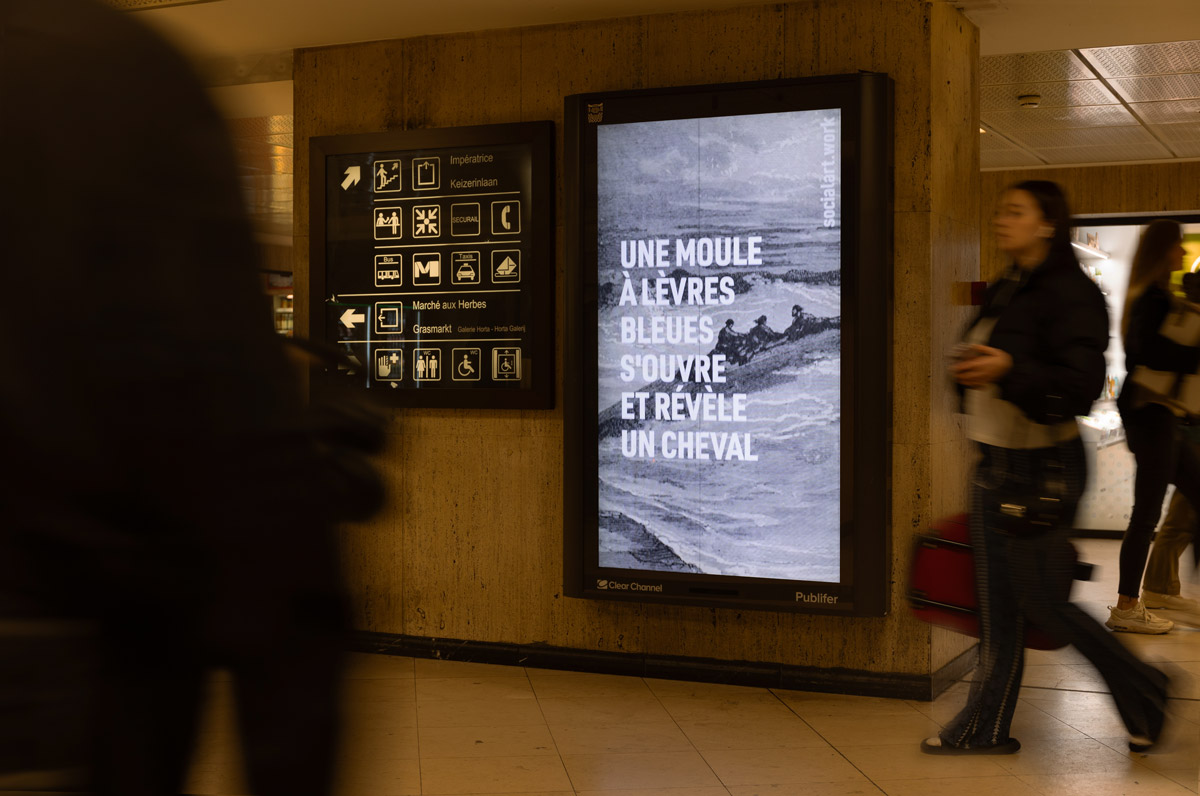
Une moule à lèvres bleues s'ouvre et révèle un cheval (A Blue-lipped Mussel Opens To Reveal a Horse) from 100 Years of Surrealism, Brussels, Belgium, 2022

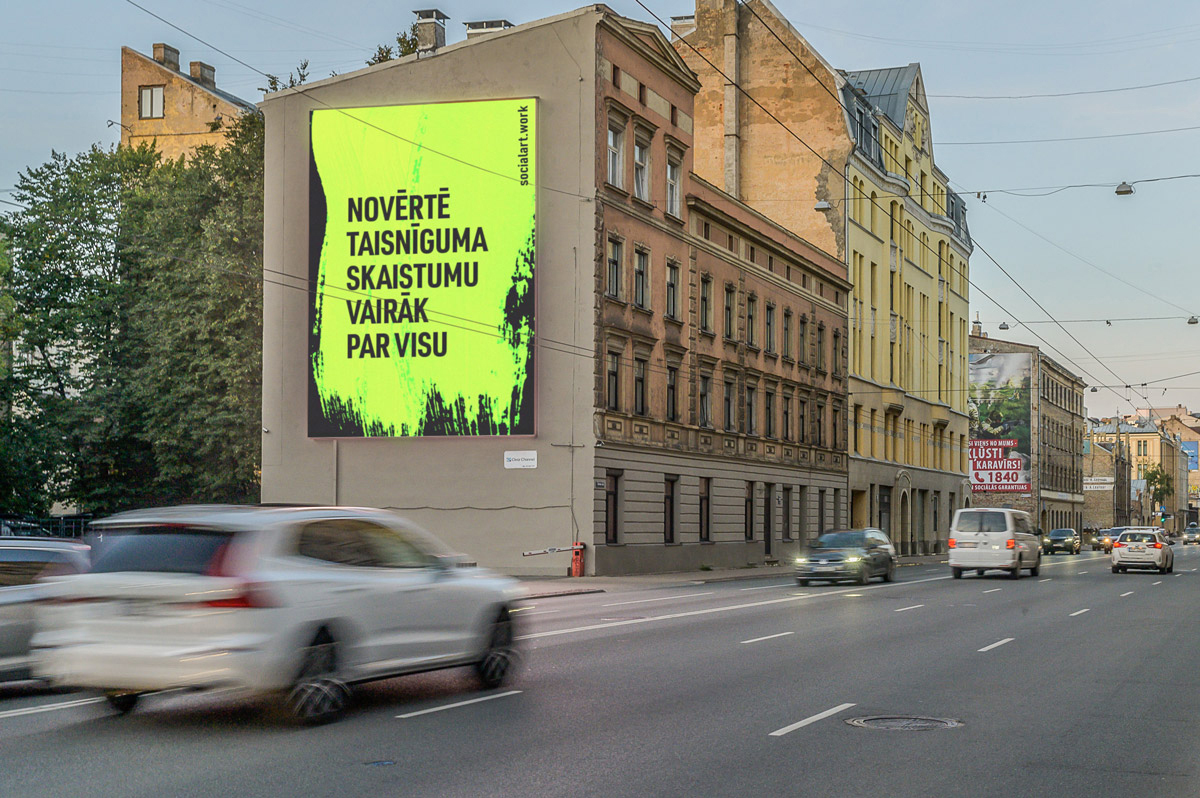
Novērtē Taisnīguma Skaistumu Vairāk Par Visu (Prize the Beauty of Justice Above All Else) from 4 Tenets for Europe, Riga, Latvia 2023

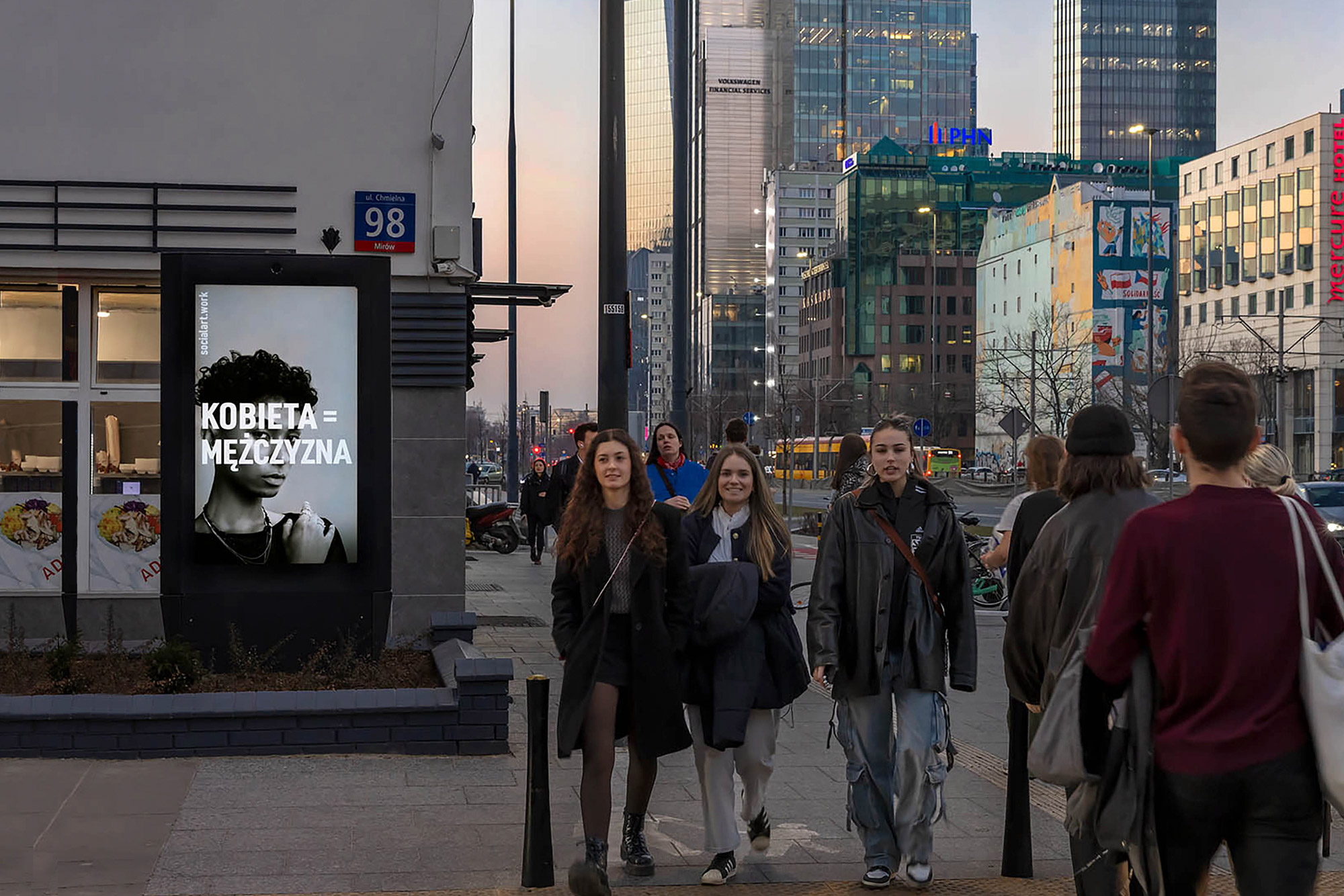
Kobieta=Mężczyzna (Woman Equals Man) for International Women's Day, Warsaw, Poland, 2025

== Beauty ==
The Swiss-German curator, Barbara Ulbrist, has written extensively on the subject of beauty in Firrell's work: 'The philosopher Rudolf Steiner often refers to what he calls ‘the genius of language’ for insights into the nature of reality. In German the word ‘beautiful’ (das schoene) is related to the word ‘shining’ (das scheinende). Steiner maintains that ‘the beautiful shines; brings its inner nature to the surface’. This philosophical observation might just as easily be applied to Firrell's art; its surface qualities of openness, clarity and directness are the source of both its expressive force and its beauty in the Steinerian sense.'

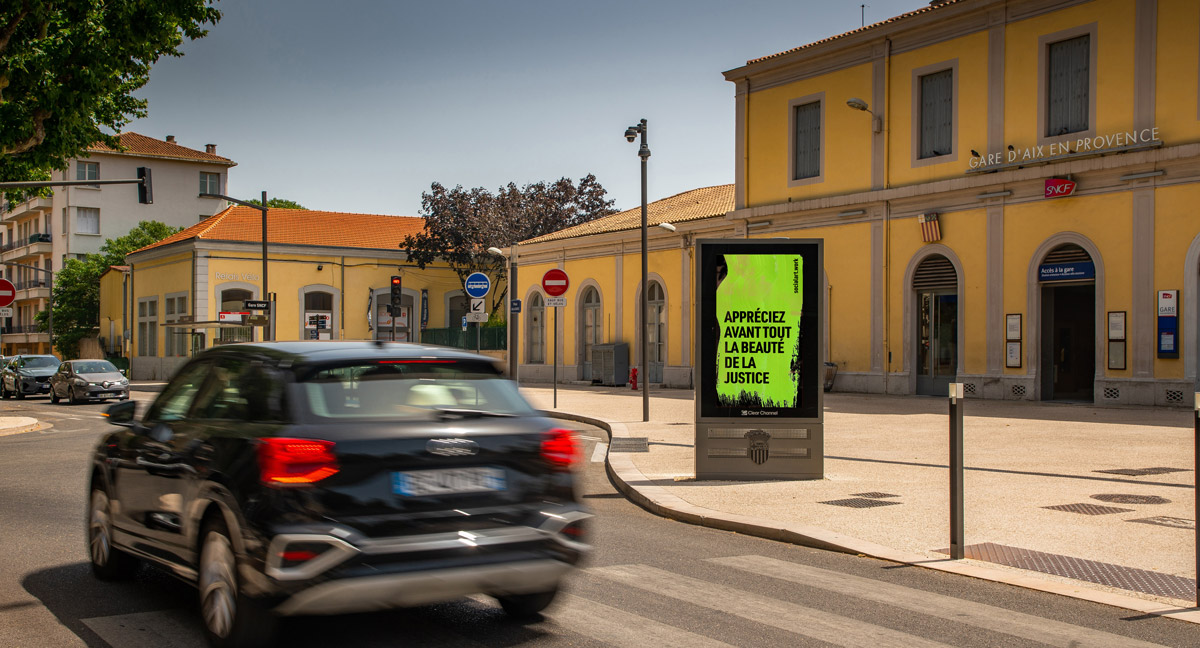
Prize the Beauty of Justice Above All Else, Aix en Provence France, 2023

When questioned in a television interview about the role of beauty in his works, Firrell's answer said much about his fundamental motivations as an artist: "I suppose everything hinges on your definition of beauty - what could be more beautiful than to try to say something about the world being more just or fairer? I can't think of anything more exquisitely wondrous - the immense and vast beauty of justice - it's better than all the coloured paint in the world."

== Writing ==
Lucid Between Bouts of Sanity published privately by the artist, London & St Petersburg, 1996, paperback leaflet, purple ink on cream stock, 130 x 280mm 48PP. French translation Catherine Clark. Russian Translation Yekaterina Lebedeva. Edited by Sarah Cannon. Distributed during 1996 (precise date unknown), The Institute of Contemporary Arts (ICA), London UK, Literaturnoye Kafe, St Petersburg Russia.

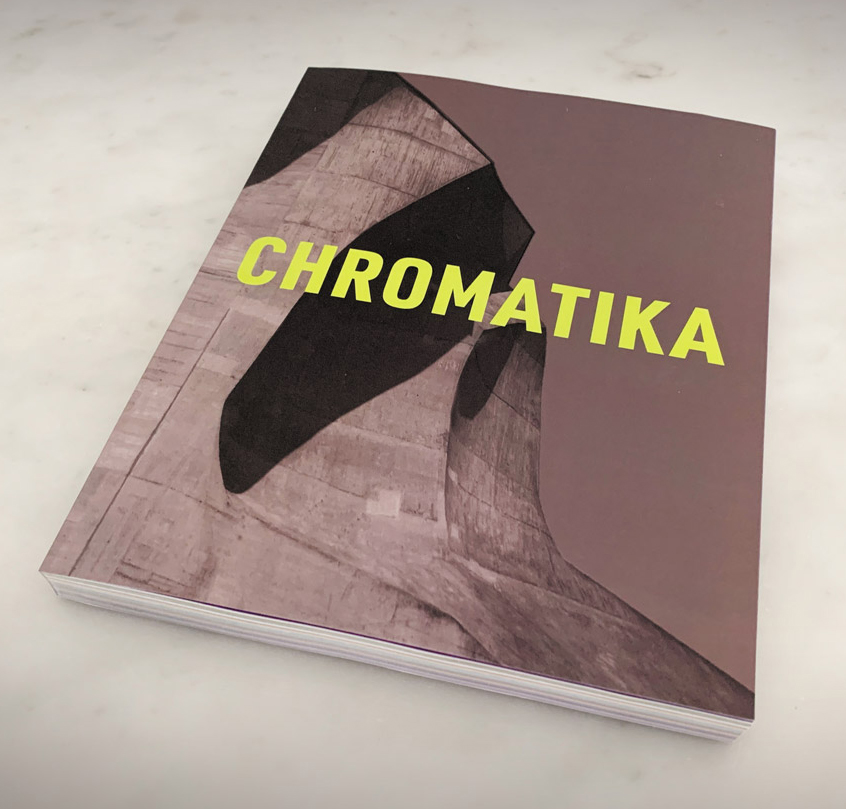
The Chromatika by Martin Firrell, 2021

The Unconstructible Machine and Other Essays, Martin Firrell Company, London, 8 October 2017, paperback, 127 x 203mm 106pp. ISBN 978-0-9931786-8-9.

The World Is Divided by a Gender War Fabricated to Keep Us at Loggerheads. Gender Is a Myth. It Does Not Really Exist, Martin Firrell Company, London 17 September 2018, paperback 127 x 203mm 79pp. ISBN 978-1-912622-03-0.

Art and Theosophy: Texts by Martin Firrell and A.L. Pogosky, Martin Firrell Company, London, 16 August 2019, paperback 127 x 203mm 94pp. ISBN 978-1-912622-06-1.

Protection for Women: Jane Anger's 1589 Feminist Text in Modern English, Martin Firrell Company, London, 31 October 2019, paperback 127 x 203mm 106pp. ISBN 978-1-912622-19-1.

The Chromatika / Die Chromatika: A new psychological theory of colour for the 21st Century / Eine neue psychologische Farbenlehre für das 21. Jahrhundert, Martin Firrell Company, London 1 July 2021, paperback 190 x 235mm 234pp. English & German. ISBN 978-1-912622-32-0.

The First Manifesto of Surrealism, Cambridge Queer Press, Cambridge England, 26 September 2024, paperback 127 x 178mm 42pp. ISBN 9781912622504.

== Catalogue Raisonné ==
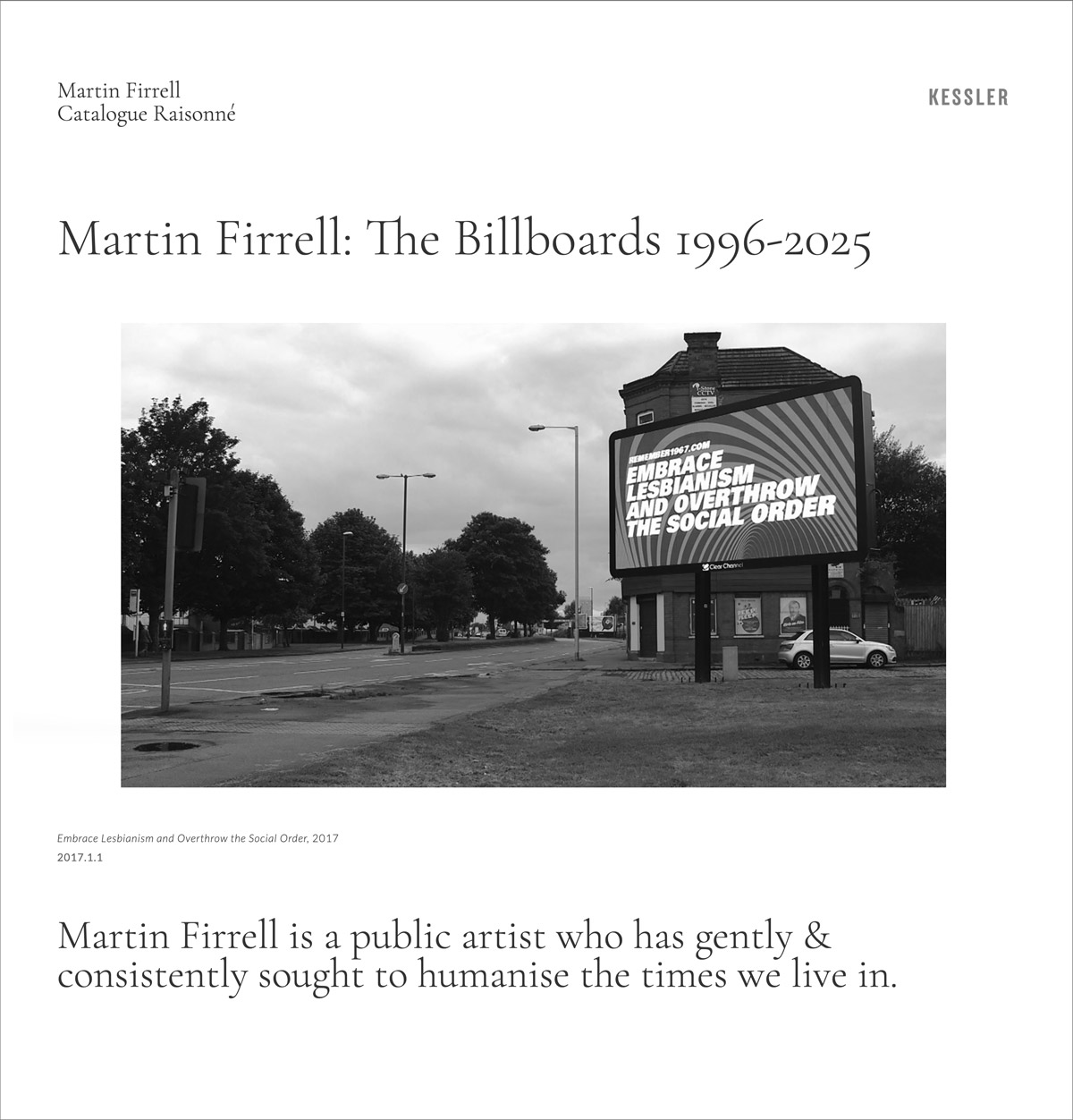
Home page of Martin Firrell Catalogue Raisonné, Kessler, 2025

A digital catalogue raisonné of Firrell's complete billboard artworks is published by Kessler, edited by Dr. Robert Shelton with a foreword by Stevie Spring, former CEO of billboard company Clear Channel UK.

The publication is a digital catalogue raisonné in preparation of the works of a living artist and, as such, it is updated annually with new works, insertion of omissions, and corrections.
