= List of elections in 1970 =

The following elections occurred in the year 1970.

== Africa ==
- 1970 Cameroonian parliamentary election
- 1970 Cameroonian presidential election
- 1970 Dahomeyan presidential election
- 1970 Democratic Republic of the Congo parliamentary election
- 1970 Democratic Republic of the Congo presidential election
- 1970 Ivorian general election
- 1970 Lesotho general election
- 1970 Malagasy parliamentary election
- 1970 Moroccan parliamentary election
- 1970 Nigerien parliamentary election
- 1970 Nigerien presidential election
- 1970 Rhodesian general election
- 1970 Seychellois parliamentary election
- 1970 South African general election
- 1970 Tanzanian general election
- 1970 Upper Voltan parliamentary election
- 1970 Upper Voltan constitutional referendum

== Asia ==
- 1970 Ceylonese parliamentary election
- 1970 Cypriot legislative election
- 1970 Iranian local elections
- 1970 Lebanese presidential election
- 1970 Pakistani general election
- 1970 Philippine Constitutional Convention election
- 1970 Sikkimese general election
- 1970 Singaporean presidential election
- 1970 Singaporean by-elections
- 1970 Soviet Union legislative election

== Australia ==
- 1970 Australian Senate election
- 1970 Australian Capital Territory by-election
- 1970 Chisholm by-election
- 1970 Georges River state by-election
- 1970 Randwick state by-election
- 1970 South Australian state election
- 1970 Victorian state election

== Europe ==
- 1970 Albanian parliamentary election
- 1970 Danish local elections
- 1970 Faroese general election
- 1970 Finnish parliamentary election
- 1970 Italian local elections
- 1970 Liechtenstein general election
- 1970 Soviet Union legislative election
- 1970 Swedish general election

=== Austria ===
- 1970 Austrian legislative election

=== France ===
- 1970 French cantonal elections

=== United Kingdom ===
- 1970 United Kingdom general election
  - England: 1970 United Kingdom general election in England
  - Scotland: 1970 United Kingdom general election in Scotland
  - Wales: 1970 United Kingdom general election in Wales
  - Northern Ireland: 1970 United Kingdom general election in Northern Ireland
  - List of MPs elected in the 1970 United Kingdom general election
- 1970 Greater London Council election
- 1970 South Ayrshire by-election
- 1970 Bridgwater by-election
- 1970 Enfield West by-election
- 1970 St Marylebone by-election
- 1970 University of Kent at Canterbury Chancellor election
- 1970 United Kingdom local elections

== Americas ==
- 1970 Brazilian legislative election
- 1970 Costa Rican general election
- 1970 Colombian general election
- 1970 Dominican Republic general election
- 1970 Guatemalan general election
- 1970 Salvadoran legislative election

=== Canada ===
- 1970 Edmonton municipal by-election
- 1970 New Brunswick general election
- 1970 Northwest Territories general election
- 1970 Nova Scotia general election
- 1970 Prince Edward Island general election
- 1970 Quebec general election
- 1970 Yukon general election

=== Mexico ===
- 1970 Mexican general election

=== United States ===
- 1970 United States elections

==== United States lieutenant gubernatorial ====
- 1970 Alabama lieutenant gubernatorial election
- 1970 California lieutenant gubernatorial election
- 1970 Georgia lieutenant gubernatorial election
- 1970 Minnesota lieutenant gubernatorial election
- 1970 Nebraska lieutenant gubernatorial election
- 1970 Nevada lieutenant gubernatorial election
- 1970 Ohio lieutenant gubernatorial election
- 1970 Texas lieutenant gubernatorial election

==== United States gubernatorial ====
- 1970 Alabama gubernatorial election
- 1970 Alaska gubernatorial election
- 1970 Arizona gubernatorial election
- 1970 Arkansas gubernatorial election
- 1970 California gubernatorial election
- 1970 Colorado gubernatorial election
- 1970 Connecticut gubernatorial election
- 1970 Florida gubernatorial election
- 1970 Georgia gubernatorial election
- 1970 Hawaii gubernatorial election
- 1970 Idaho gubernatorial election
- 1970 Iowa gubernatorial election
- 1970 Kansas gubernatorial election
- 1970 Maine gubernatorial election
- 1970 Maryland gubernatorial election
- 1970 Massachusetts gubernatorial election
- 1970 Michigan gubernatorial election
- 1970 Minnesota gubernatorial election
- 1970 Nebraska gubernatorial election
- 1970 Nevada gubernatorial election
- 1970 New Hampshire gubernatorial election
- 1970 New Mexico gubernatorial election
- 1970 New York gubernatorial election
- 1970 Ohio gubernatorial election
- 1970 Oklahoma gubernatorial election
- 1970 Oregon gubernatorial election
- 1970 Pennsylvania gubernatorial election
- 1970 Rhode Island gubernatorial election
- 1970 South Carolina gubernatorial election
- 1970 South Dakota gubernatorial election
- 1970 Tennessee gubernatorial election
- 1970 Texas gubernatorial election
- 1970 United States gubernatorial elections
- 1970 Vermont gubernatorial election
- 1970 Wisconsin gubernatorial election
- 1970 Wyoming gubernatorial election

==== United States House of Representatives ====
- 1970 United States House of Representatives elections

==== United States Senate ====
- 1970 United States Senate elections
- 1970 United States Senate special election in Alaska
- 1970 United States Senate election in Arizona
- 1970 United States Senate election in California
- 1970 United States Senate election in Connecticut
- 1970 United States Senate election in Delaware
- 1970 United States Senate election in Florida
- 1970 United States Senate election in Hawaii
- 1970 United States Senate election in Illinois
- 1970 United States Senate special election in Illinois
- 1970 United States Senate election in Indiana
- 1970 United States Senate election in Maine
- 1970 United States Senate election in Maryland
- 1970 United States Senate election in Massachusetts
- 1970 United States Senate election in Michigan
- 1970 United States Senate election in Minnesota
- 1970 United States Senate election in Mississippi
- 1970 United States Senate election in Missouri
- 1970 United States Senate election in Montana
- 1970 United States Senate election in Nebraska
- 1970 United States Senate election in Nevada
- 1970 United States Senate election in New Jersey
- 1970 United States Senate election in New Mexico
- 1970 United States Senate election in New York
- 1970 United States Senate election in North Dakota
- 1970 United States Senate election in Ohio
- 1970 United States Senate election in Pennsylvania
- 1970 United States Senate election in Rhode Island
- 1970 United States Senate election in Tennessee
- 1970 United States Senate election in Texas
- 1970 United States Senate election in Utah
- 1970 United States Senate election in Vermont
- 1970 United States Senate election in Virginia
- 1970 United States Senate election in Washington
- 1970 United States Senate election in West Virginia
- 1970 United States Senate election in Wisconsin
- 1970 United States Senate election in Wyoming

==== United States mayoral elections ====
- 1969–70 New Orleans mayoral election
- 1970 Newark mayoral election

=== Chile ===
- 1970 Chilean presidential election

==== Other ====
- The Battle of Aspen
- 1969–70 New Orleans mayoral election
- 1970 New York state election
- Forward Thrust (Washington (U.S. state))

== Oceania ==
=== Australia ===
- 1970 Australian Senate election
- 1970 Australian Capital Territory by-election
- 1970 Chisholm by-election
- 1970 Georges River state by-election
- 1970 Murrumbidgee state by-election
- 1970 Randwick state by-election
- 1970 South Australian state election
- 1970 Upper Hunter state by-election
- 1970 Victorian state election
