= Northern Ireland Civil Service Alliance =

The Northern Ireland Civil Service Alliance (NICSA) was a trade union representing civil servants working in Northern Ireland.

The union was founded in 1922 as the Association of Established Civil Servants, representing workers in the recently established Civil Service of Northern Ireland. Membership grew steadily, reaching 800 by 1925, but then stalled. In 1934, the union took advice from William Brown of the British Civil Service Clerical Association, and on his recommendation, it renamed itself as the Association of Civil Servants in the Government of Northern Ireland and began accepting temporary staff.

The restructure was successful, and the union's membership was over 1,000 by 1937. This enabled it to employ a full-time general secretary for the first time, A. B. Douglas being appointed.

By 1950, the union had 4,500 members. That year, it renamed itself as the "Northern Ireland Civil Service Alliance", and attempted to negotiate a merger with a British civil service union. The negotiations were unsuccessful, and the union instead began working closely with the Civil Service Professional Officers' Association (CSPOA).

In 1971, the Ulster Public Officers' Association voted to merge into NICSA, but before it could do so, NICSA merged with the CSPOA to form the Public Services Alliance, soon renamed as the Northern Ireland Public Service Alliance. NICSA continued to operate as a distinct section of the new union for many years.
