= List of MPs for constituencies in Wales (1970–February 1974) =

This is a list of members of Parliament (MPs) elected to the House of Commons of the United Kingdom by Welsh constituencies for the Forty-Fifth Parliament of the United Kingdom (1970–February 1974).

Most MPs elected for Welsh constituencies at the 1970 United Kingdom general election, held on 18 June 1970, served a full term, apart from Independent MP S. O. Davies who died in 1972.

The list is sorted by the name of the MP.

== Composition ==
Affiliation	Members
Welsh Labour Party	27
Welsh Conservative Party	7
Welsh Liberal Party	1
Independent Labour	1
Total	36

== MPs ==
MP	Constituency	Party	In constituency since
Leo Abse	Pontypool	Labour Party	1958 by-election
James Callaghan	Cardiff South East	Labour Party	1945
Donald Coleman	Neath	Labour Party	1964
Denzil Davies	Llanelli	Labour Party	1970
Elfed Davies	Rhondda East	Labour Party	1959
Ifor Davies	Gower	Labour Party	1959
S. O. Davies	Merthyr Tydfil	Independent Labour	1934 by-election
Nicholas Edwards	Pembrokeshire	Conservative Party	1970
Will Edwards	Merioneth	Labour Party	1966
Tom Ellis	Wrexham	Labour Party	1970
Alfred Evans	Caerphilly	Labour Party	1968 by-election
Michael Foot	Ebbw Vale	Labour Party	1960 by-election
Raymond Gower	Barry	Conservative Party	1951
Emlyn Hooson	Montgomery	Liberal Party	1962 by-election
Cledwyn Hughes	Anglesey	Labour Party	1951
Roy Hughes	Newport	Labour Party	1966
Brynmor John	Pontypridd	Labour Party	1970
Alec Jones	Rhondda West	Labour Party	1967 by-election
Barry Jones	Flint East	Labour Party	1970
Gwynoro Jones	Carmarthen	Labour Party	1970
Neil Kinnock	Bedwellty	Labour Party	1970
Neil McBride	Swansea East	Labour Party	1963 by-election
Anthony Meyer	Flint West	Conservative Party	1970
Elystan Morgan	Cardiganshire	Labour Party	1966
Geraint Morgan	Denbigh	Conservative Party	1959
John Morris	Abervaon	Labour Party	1959
Walter Padley	Ogmore	Labour Party	1950
Arthur Probert	Aberdare	Labour Party	1954 by-election
Goronwy Roberts	Caernarfon	Labour Party	1950
Michael Roberts	Cardiff North	Conservative Party	1970
Wyn Roberts	Conwy	Conservative Party	1970
Caerwyn Roderick	Brecon and Radnor	Labour Party	1970
Ted Rowlands	Merthyr Tydfil	Labour Party	1972 by-election
Jeffrey Thomas	Abertillery	Labour Party	1970
George Thomas	Cardiff West	Labour Party	1945
John Stradling Thomas	Monmouth	Conservative Party	1970
Alan J. Williams	Swansea West	Labour Party	1964

== By-elections ==
There was one by-election during this period:

- 1972 Merthyr Tydfil by-election was won by Labour candidate Ted Rowlands

== See also ==
- 1970 United Kingdom general election
- 1970 United Kingdom general election in Wales
