= 1970 United Kingdom general election in England =

- 18 June 1970

All 511 English seats in the House of Commons
- Turnout: 71.4% (▼4.5 pp)
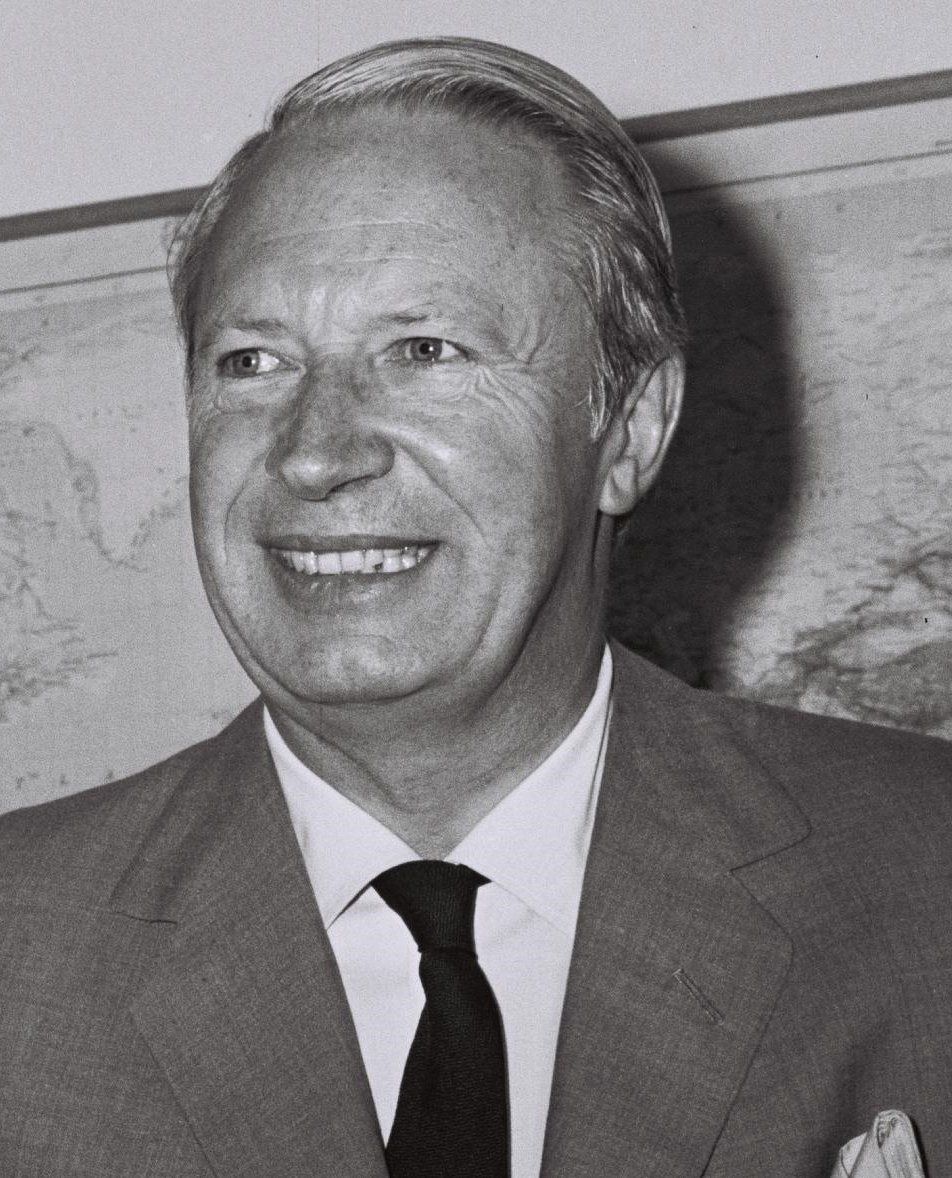

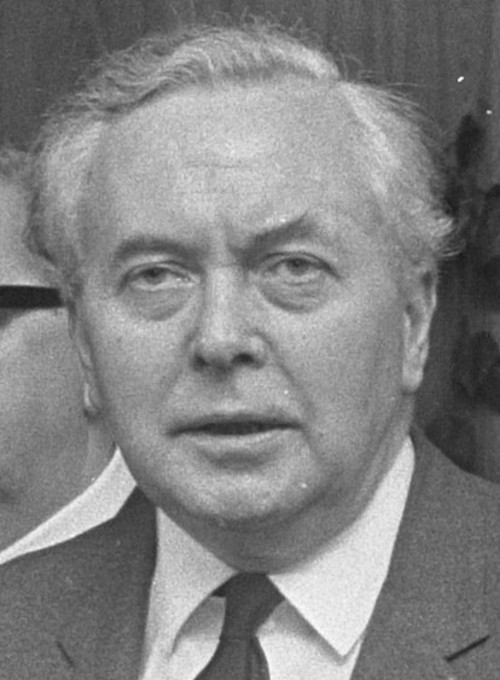
	First party	Second party	Third party
			Lib
Leader	Edward Heath	Harold Wilson	Jeremy Thorpe
Party	Conservative	Labour	Liberal
Leader since	28 July 1965	14 February 1963	18 January 1967
Leader's seat	Bexley	Huyton	North Devon
Last election	219 seats, 42.7%	286 seats, 48.0%	6 seats, 21.3%
Seats won	292	217 (Note: Figure includes Speaker of the House of Commons Horace King in Southampton Itchen.)	2
Seat change	▲73	▼69	▼4
Popular vote	11,282,524	10,131,555	1,853,616
Percentage	48.3%	43.5%	7.9%
Swing	▲5.6 pp	▼4.6 pp	▼1.1 pp

On Thursday 18 June 1970, the 1970 United Kingdom general election was held in England, to elect all 630 members of the House of Commons, with 511 constituencies being in England.

This was the first general election in which people could vote from the age of eighteen years, after passage of the Representation of the People Act the previous year, and the first UK general election in which party affiliations of candidates were put on the ballot papers. The closing of the polls was also extended from 9.00 pm to 10.00 pm.

== Candidates ==
Below is a table summarising the candidates of the 1970 general election in England.

Affiliation	Candidates
Labour Party	511
Conservative and Unionist Party	510
Scottish Liberal Party	282
Communist Party of Great Britain	35
Independent	22
National Front	9
National Democratic Party	4 (Note: The candidates that stood were Douglas Hardy in Birmingham Stechford, David R. M. Brown in Ipswich, Edwin Bray in Southampton Itchen and Robert E. Welford in Leicester North West.)
Democratic Party	4 (Note: The candidates that stood were Peter Boyle in Newcastle-under-Lyme, Barry Gray Morris in North Devon, Alec Boothroyd in Reading and John Walter Gerald Sparrow in Huyton.)
Anti-Common Market	3 (Note: The candidates that stood were Daniel Brunner in Henley, Walter Harvey in Kingston upon Hull North and John D. Hill in Wallasey.)
Independent Conservative	3 (Note: The candidates that stood were Michael Coney in Bexley, Ian Josephs in Isle of Thanet and Edgar Scruby in Surbiton.)
Socialist Party of Great Britain	2
Other	18 (Note: Each were individual candidates or minor parties.)
Total	1,403

== Analysis ==
In England, the Conservative Party led by Edward Heath scored a decisive victory by winning 292 seats over the incumbent Labour Party led by Prime Minister Harold Wilson which was restricted to 217 seats. Overall, the Conservative Party won 330 seats in the House of Commons while Labour won 288 seats.

The Labour Party lost an overall 70 seats to the Conservatives in England, though David Clark won Colne Valley from Richard Wainwright of the Liberal Party. The Labour party had lost the seat to the Liberal Party in the 1966 general election, being the only seat it lost in that election. This was the only gain the Labour party made in England and the wider United Kingdom compared to the previous election. Wainwright would regain the constituency in 1974. The Liberal Party also lost Orpington, Bodmin and Cheadle to the Conservative Party. As such, the Liberal Party were reduced to just two seats, with a slight decrease in its vote share.

Notable politicians that entered Parliament in English constituencies include future Conservative Party Ministers Kenneth Clarke in Rushcliffe and Norman Fowler in Nottingham South for the Conservative Party. Geoffrey Howe re-entered Parliament in the seat of Reigate.

Among the five Conservative members of Parliament who won by-elections against Labour in English constituencies since the previous election, only Keith Speed retained his seat in Meriden which he had initially won in 1968. Kenneth Baker, elected initially on the same day, was unsuccessful in retaining Acton. Donald Williams was also unsuccessful in retaining Dudley after the 1968 by-election; he also initially entered Parliament on the same day as Speed and Baker. Baker would, however, shortly re-entered Parliament following the 1970 St Marylebone by-election. Additionally, Bruce Campbell and Christopher Ward were also unsuccessful in retaining seats won in by-elections.

== Results ==
Party	Seats					Aggregate votes		
Party	Total	Gains	Losses	Net	Of all (%)	Total	Of all (%)	Change (%)
Conservative	292	73	0	▲73	57.1	11,282,524	48.3	▲5.6
Labour	217	1	70	▼69	42.3	10,131,555	43.4	▼4.6
Liberal	2	0	4	▼4	0.4	1,853,616	7.9	▼1.1
Communist	0	0	0	Steady	—	20,103	0.1	Steady
Independent	0	0	0	Steady	—	15,877	0.1	Steady
National Democratic	0	0	0	Steady	—	14,321	0.1	▲0.1
National Front	0	New			—	10,467	0.0	New
Anti-Common Market	0	New			—	5,714	0.0	New
Ind. Conservative	0	0	0	Steady	—	4,675	0.0	Steady
Independent Liberal	0	0	0	Steady	—	3,937	0.0	Steady
Ratepayers (Leigh)	0	New			—	3,776	0.0	New
Democratic	0	New			—	3,468	0.0	New
Anti-Immigration	0	New			—	1,616	0.0	New
New Liberal	0	0	0	Steady	—	1,161	0.0	Steady
Vectis National Party	0	New			—	1,607	0.0	New
Mebyon Kernow	0	New			—	960	0.0	New
Ind. Labour Party	0	0	0	Steady	—	847	0.0	Steady
World Government	0	New			—	840	0.0	New
British Movement	0	New			—	704	0.0	New
Independent Progressive	0	Did not stand in 1966			—	658	0.0	—N/a
Independent Resident	0	New			—	542	0.0	New
Radical Alliance	0	0	0	Steady	—	421	0.0	Steady
Socialist (GB)	0	0	0	Steady	—	376	0.0	Steady
Anti-Party	0	New			—	334	0.0	New
Social Credit	0	0	0	Steady	—	254	0.0	Steady
Young Ideas	0	New			—	157	0.0	New
Independent Anti-Labour	0	New			—	157	0.0	New
British Commonwealth	0	New			—	117	0.0	New
Anti-Election	0	New			—	112	0.0	New
Blank and invalid votes						33,217	—	—
Total	511			0	100.0	23,360,896 (Note: All valid votes excluding spoiled votes.)	100.0	0.0
Registered voters, and turnout						32,737,025	71.4	▼4.5

Popular vote
Conservative	48.3%
Labour	43.4%
Liberal	7.9%
Other	0.4%

Parliament seats
Conservative	57.14%
Labour	42.47%
Liberal	0.39%

== By region ==
Note: the following tables indicate the results according to the regions of England which were established in 1994, based on the county boundaries established in the 1974 local government reforms. These regions were not used at the time for the purposes of this election.

=== East Midlands ===
Party	Seats					Aggregate votes		
Party	Total	Gains	Losses	Net	Of all (%)	Total	Of all (%)	Change (%)
Conservative	19	8	0	▲8	50.0	—N/a	47.5	▲6.3
Labour	19	0	8	▼8	50.0	—N/a	47.5	▼5.2
Liberal	0	0	0	Steady	0.0	—N/a	4.5	▼1.6
Others	0	0	0	Steady	0.0	—N/a	0.5	▲0.4
Total	38					—N/a		

=== East of England ===
Party	Seats					Aggregate votes		
Party	Total	Gains	Losses	Net	Of all (%)	Total	Of all (%)	Change (%)
Conservative	37	11	0	▲11	90.2	—N/a	52.2	▲6.5
Labour	4	0	11	▼11	9.8	—N/a	40.2	▼4.7
Liberal	0	0	0	Steady	0.0	—N/a	7.4	▼1.9
Others	0	0	0	Steady	0.0	—N/a	0.2	▲0.1
Total	41					—N/a		

=== Greater London ===
Party	Seats					Aggregate votes		
Party	Total	Gains	Losses	Net	Of all (%)	Total	Of all (%)	Change (%)
Labour	55	0	10	▼10	53.9	—N/a	45.8	▼3.2
Conservative	47	10	0	▲11	46.1	—N/a	46.6	▲5.6
Liberal	0	0	1	▼1	0.0	—N/a	6.9	▼2.4
Others	0	0	0	Steady	0.0	—N/a	0.7	Steady
Total	102					—N/a		

=== North East England ===
Party	Seats					Aggregate votes		
Party	Total	Gains	Losses	Net	Of all (%)	Total	Of all (%)	Change (%)
Labour	26	0	1	▼1	83.9	—N/a	59.6	▼3.5
Conservative	5	0	1	▲1	16.1	—N/a	38.2	▲3.7
Liberal	0	0	0	Steady	0.0	—N/a	2.2	▲0.2
Others	0	0	0	Steady	0.0	—N/a	0.0	▼0.4
Total	31					—N/a		

=== North West England ===
Party	Seats					Aggregate votes		
Party	Total	Gains	Losses	Net	Of all (%)	Total	Of all (%)	Change (%)
Labour	44	0	13	▼13	53.0	—N/a	45.7	▼4.7
Conservative	39	14	0	▲14	47.0	—N/a	46.7	▲5.2
Liberal	0	0	1	▼1	0.0	—N/a	7.2	▼0.4
Others	0	0	0	Steady	0.0	—N/a	0.4	Steady
Total	83					—N/a		

=== South East England ===
Party	Seats					Aggregate votes		
Party	Total	Gains	Losses	Net	Of all (%)	Total	Of all (%)	Change (%)
Conservative	58	10	0	▲10	95.1	—N/a	54.4	▲5.4
Labour	3	0	10	▼10	4.9	—N/a	32.1	▼4.3
Liberal	0	0	0	Steady	0.0	—N/a	12.8	▼1.6
Others	0	0	0	Steady	0.0	—N/a	0.7	▲0.5
Total	61					—N/a		

=== South West England ===
Party	Seats					Aggregate votes		
Party	Total	Gains	Losses	Net	Of all (%)	Total	Of all (%)	Change (%)
Conservative	37	6	0	▲6	82.2	—N/a	51.5	▲5.9
Labour	6	0	5	▼5	13.3	—N/a	33.8	▼4.2
Liberal	2	0	1	▼1	4.4	—N/a	14.5	▼1.7
Others	0	0	0	Steady	0.0	—N/a	0.1	▼0.1
Total	45					—N/a		

=== West Midlands ===
Party	Seats					Aggregate votes		
Party	Total	Gains	Losses	Net	Of all (%)	Total	Of all (%)	Change (%)
Conservative	30	8	0	▲8	55.6	—N/a	50.5	▲5.8
Labour	24	0	8	▼8	44.4	—N/a	44.9	▼5.8
Liberal	0	0	0	Steady	0.0	—N/a	4.2	▲0.1
Others	0	0	0	Steady	0.0	—N/a	0.4	Steady
Total	54					—N/a		

=== Yorkshire and the Humber ===
Party	Seats					Aggregate votes		
Party	Total	Gains	Losses	Net	Of all (%)	Total	Of all (%)	Change (%)
Labour	36	1	4	▼3	64.3	—N/a	50.2	▼4.7
Conservative	20	4	0	▲4	35.7	—N/a	41.8	▲4.5
Liberal	0	0	1	▼1	0.0	—N/a	7.8	▲0.3
Others	0	0	0	Steady	0.0	—N/a	0.3	Steady
Total	56					—N/a		

== See also ==
- 1970 United Kingdom general election in Northern Ireland
- 1970 United Kingdom general election in Scotland
- 1970 United Kingdom general election in Wales
