= John Carr (Irish trade unionist) =

Irish trade union leader (born c. 1945)

John Carr (born 1945 or 1946) is a former Irish trade union leader.

== Early life and education ==
Carr was born in Downings in north-western County Donegal; his father was a fisherman, and he grew up speaking Irish. When he was twelve, Carr won a scholarship to Scoil Éanna in County Galway, an Irish-language school specialising in preparing students for teacher training. He then went to St Patrick's College of Education in Dublin, where he led an unofficial student social committee, organising dances and performances by bands – including Phil Lynott. At one of these dances, he met his future wife, Joan. He also set up a poker club with Joe O'Toole, which was still running forty years later.

== Career ==
=== Teaching ===
On graduating as a teacher, Carr found work at Scoil Eoin Baiste in Clontarf, where he worked for 22 years. He was the first male teacher in its infants section and was soon promoted to become the school's principal. During this period, he was active in the Teachers' Club in Dublin, and in the 1980s, remortgaged his house to keep it running. In his spare time, he worked as a DJ, a job the Sunday World campaigned against as inappropriate for a principal.

=== Union ===
In 1989, Carr became the full-time assistant general secretary of the Irish National Teachers' Organisation (INTO), its general treasurer in 1997, and its general secretary in 2001. Under his leadership, the union successfully encouraged the formation of various structures to counter educational disadvantage, including the National Council for Special Education, the DEIS initiative, the Teaching Council, and the Statutory Committee on Educational Disadvantage.

Carr stood down from his trade union post in 2010.

=== Recognition ===
Carr was named Donegal Person of the Year in 2009.

Trade union offices
Preceded by Joe O'Toole	General Secretary of the Irish National Teachers' Organisation; 2001–2010	Succeeded by Sheila Nunan
