= Jim McCusker (trade unionist) =

Jim McCusker (born 1943) is a former trade union leader from Northern Ireland.

Born in the Divis area of West Belfast, McCusker was educated at a Christian Brothers School. He left at the age of sixteen and found work as a clerical officer at the Ministry of Finance. In the evenings, he studied economics at Queen's University Belfast, graduating after five years. He also joined the Northern Ireland Civil Service Association, and by 1963 was the union's secretary for the Ministry.

McCusker became a senior clerk with the Ministry of Commerce in 1965, but remained active in the union. Three years later, he was appointed as the full-time secretary of the staff side of the Whitley Council for the Northern Ireland Civil Service. However, he left in 1971 to become the deputy general secretary of the newly-founded Northern Ireland Public Service Alliance (NIPSA). General secretary Brendan Harkin unexpectedly resigned in 1977, and McCusker won the election to succeed him.

Under McCusker's leadership, the union became increasingly militant, and in 1979 undertook its first all-out strike, which succeeded in winning higher pay. He also became involved in the Irish Congress of Trade Unions, serving as its president in 1985/86. In this role, he called for the organisation to take more action against low pay, and to remain neutral on the Anglo-Irish Agreement.

McCusker retired from his trade union roles in 2003, joining the Labour Relations Agency, which he chaired from 2008 until 2014. He has served on a large number of committees, including the Council for Healthcare Regulatory Excellence, Economic Council, Economic Development Forum, Industrial Court and Public Service Commission.

Trade union offices
Preceded by Brendan Harkin	General Secretary of the Northern Ireland Public Service Alliance; 1978–2003	Succeeded by John Corey
Preceded by Matt Merrigan	President of the Irish Congress of Trade Unions; 1985–1986	Succeeded by John Carroll
