= Sheila Nunan =

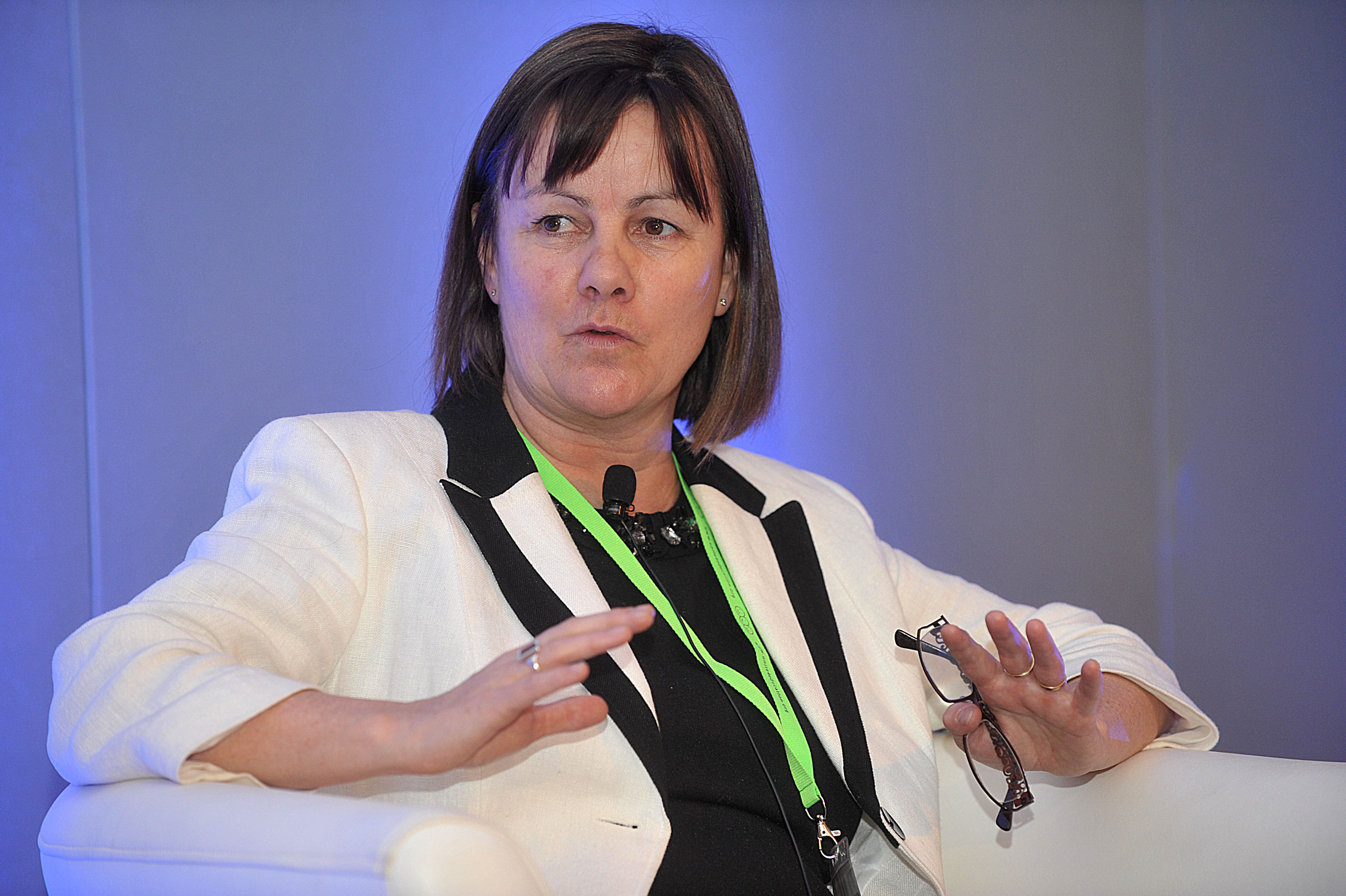
Sheila Nunan, INTO General Secretary speaking on a panel at Education Conference 2018

Sheila Nunan is a former president of the Irish Congress of Trade Unions and former General Secretary of the Irish National Teachers' Organisation. She has been a member of the executive of the INTO since 1995 and was INTO President from 2005 to 2006, and INTO General Secretary from 2010 until 2019. Sheila Nunan was the first woman to hold the role of General Secretary in the trade union's 150-year history.

In 2006, Nunan was elected Deputy General Secretary/General Treasurer and served in that role until her election as General Secretary in 2009.

Nunan is a former primary school teacher and principal. She taught in Tallaght and Bray. She is a graduate of University College, Dublin and St. Patrick's College, Drumcondra.

She stood for the Labour Party in the Ireland South constituency at the 2019 European Parliament election in Ireland. Her selection attracted controversy as she lives in County Dublin, which is not part of the South constituency. Her team replied that she lives near the border with County Wicklow and her parents are from County Kerry, both located in the South constituency.

Trade union offices
Preceded by John Carr	General Secretary of the Irish National Teachers' Organisation; 2010–2019	Succeeded by John Boyle
Preceded by Brian Campfield	President of the Irish Congress of Trade Unions; 2017–2019	Succeeded by Gerry Murphy
