= 1970 United Kingdom general election in Scotland =

All 71 Scottish seats to the House of Commons
- Turnout: 74.1% (▼1.9 pp)
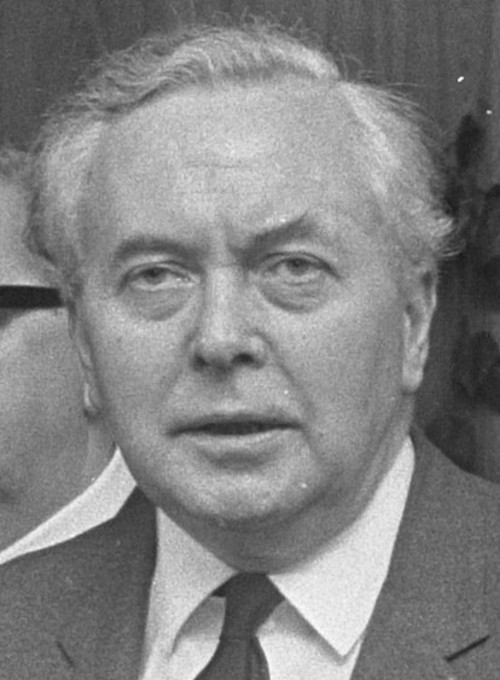

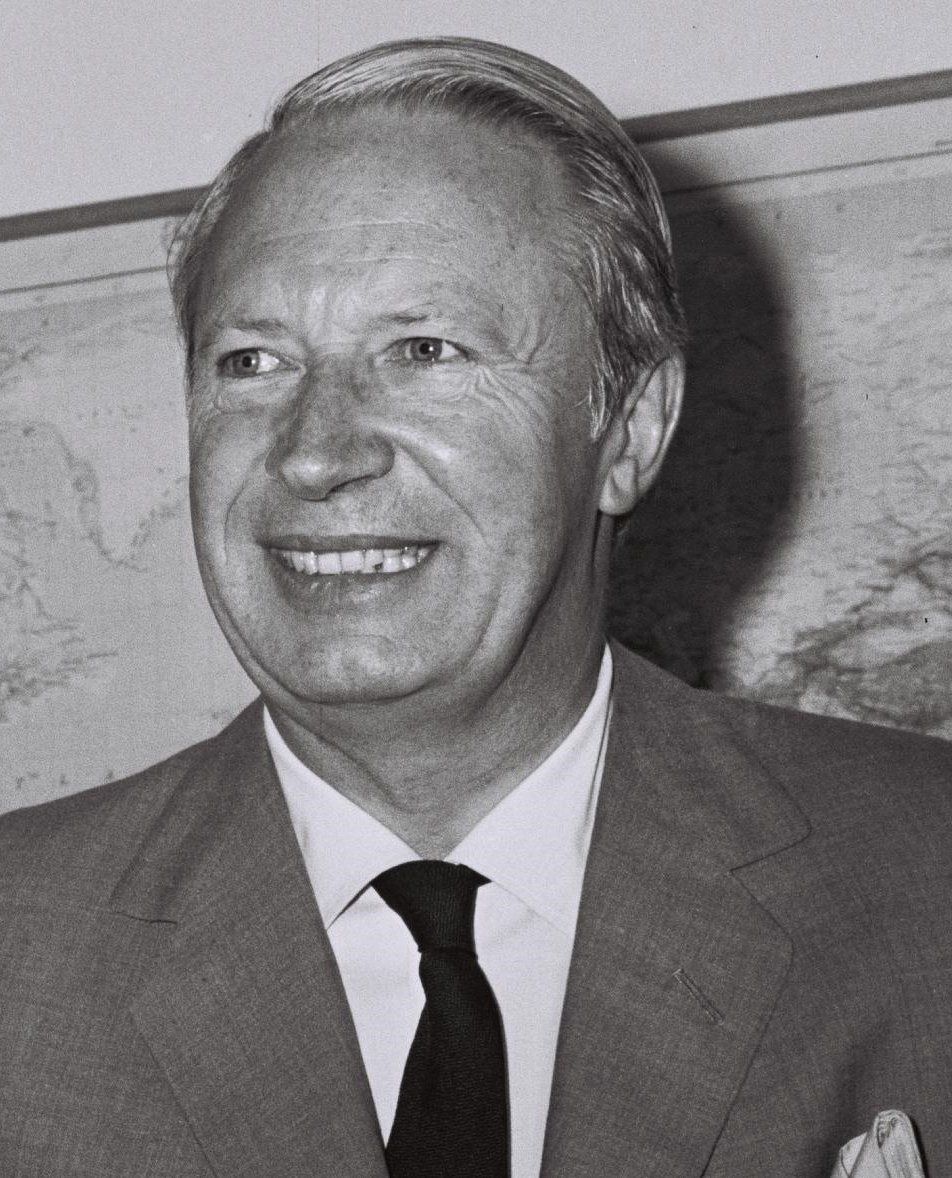
	First party	Second party
Leader	Harold Wilson	Edward Heath
Party	Labour	Conservative
Leader since	14 February 1963	28 July 1965
Leader's seat	Huyton	Bexley
Last election	46 seats, 49.9%	20 seats, 37.6%
Seats won	44	23
Seat change	▼2	▲3
Popular vote	1,197,068	1,020,674
Percentage	44.5%	38.0%
Swing	▼5.4 pp	▲0.4 pp
	Third party	Fourth party
	Lib	SNP
Leader	Jeremy Thorpe	William Wolfe
Party	Liberal	SNP
Alliance	Liberal
Leader since	18 January 1967	1 June 1969
Leader's seat	North Devon	Ran in West Lothian (defeated)
Last election	5 seats, 6.8%	0 seats, 5.0%
Seats won	3	1
Seat change	▼2	▲1
Popular vote	147,667	306,802
Percentage	5.5%	11.4%
Swing	▼1.3 pp	▲6.4 pp

On Thursday 18 June 1970, the 1970 United Kingdom general election was held in the United Kingdom, to elect all 630 members of the House of Commons, with 71 constituencies being in Scotland.

This was the first general election in which people could vote from the age of eighteen years, after passage of the Representation of the People Act the previous year, and the first UK general election in which party affiliations of candidates were put on the ballot papers. The closing of the polls was also extended from 9.00 pm to 10.00 pm.

== Candidates ==
Below is a table summarising the candidates of the 1970 general election in Scotland.

Affiliation	Candidates
Labour Party	71
Conservative and Unionist Party	70
Scottish National Party	65
Scottish Liberal Party	27
Communist Party of Great Britain	15
Independent	2 (Note: The candidates that stood were Thomas Menzies stood in Central Ayrshire and Joseph McDonagh in Glasgow Cathcart.)
Independent Scottish Nationalist	1 (Note: Candidate David H. Livingstone stood in Rutherglen.)
Independent Protestant	1 (Note: Candidate Jack Glass stood in Glasgow Bridgeton.)
Independent Conservative	1 (Note: Candidate G Ross MacKay stood in Glasgow Woodside.)
Independent Scottish Labour	1 (Note: Candidate Harry Charles Taylor stood in Hamilton.)
World Government Party	1 (Note: Candidate E. G. Macfarlane stood in Dundee East.)
Anti-Abortion	1 (Note: Candidate William R. Cassell stood in Roxburgh, Selkirk and Peebles.)
Total	256

== Analysis ==
The Labour Party won the most seats for the fourth consecutive election, however saw a drop in vote share and seats. The party lost Aberdeen South to the Conservative Party. The Conservative Party, with a slight increase in vote share, also won the seat of Ross and Cromarty and West Aberdeenshire from the Scottish Liberal Party. The Liberals had also seen a minor decrease in vote share.

The Scottish National Party won a seat for the first time in a general election, being the seat of Western Isles. It had previously won their first ever Westminster seat at the 1945 Motherwell by-election and another shock victory in the Hamilton by-election in 1967.

== Results ==
Party	Seats					Aggregate votes		
Party	Total	Gains	Losses	Net	Of total (%)	Total	Of total (%)	Change (%)
Labour	44	0	2	▼2	62.0	1,197,068	44.5	▼5.4
Conservative	23	3	0	▲3	32.4	1,020,674	38.0	▲0.4
Liberal	3	0	2	▼2	4.2	147,667	5.5	▼1.3
SNP	1	0	1	▲1	1.4	306,802	11.4	▲6.4
Communist	0	0	0	Steady	—	11,408	0.4	▼0.2
Independent Scottish Nationalist	0	Did not stand in 1966			—	1,490	0.1	—N/a
Independent Protestant	0	New			—	1,180	0.0	New
Independent	0	0	0	Steady	—	758	0.0	Steady
Ind. Conservative	0	Did not stand in 1966			—	614	0.0	—N/a
Independent Scottish Labour	0	New			—	295	0.0	New
World Government	0	New			—	176	0.0	New
Anti-Aborition	0	New			—	103	0.0	New
Blank and invalid votes						3,436	—	—
Total	71			0	100.0	2,688,235 (Note: All valid votes excluding spoiled votes.)	100.0	0.0
Registered voters, and turnout						3,629,017	74.1	▼1.9

Popular vote
Labour	44.5%
Conservative	38.0%
SNP	11.4%
Liberal	5.5%
Other	0.60%

Parliamentary seats
Labour	62.0%
Conservative	32.4%
Liberal	4.2%
SNP	1.4%

== See also ==
- 1970 United Kingdom general election in England
- 1970 United Kingdom general election in Wales
- 1970 United Kingdom general election in Northern Ireland
- List of MPs for constituencies in Scotland (1970–February 1974)
