= John Boyle (trade unionist) =

Irish trade unionist

General Secretary of INTO
- Incumbent
- Assumed office 2019
- Preceded by: Sheila Nunan

President of INTO
- In office 2017–2018
- Preceded by: Rosena Jordan
- Succeeded by: Joe Killeen

Personal details
- Born: Mullaghduff, County Donegal, Ireland
- Education: St Patrick's College, Dublin
- Occupation: Schoolteacher, trade union activist

John Boyle is an Irish trade unionist.

Boyle was born in Mullaghduff, County Donegal. He attended Pobalscoil Chloich Cheannfhaola in Falcarragh, County Donegal. He studied at St. Patrick's College in Drumcondra from 1983–1986, before graduating and becoming a staff member at Scoil Mhuire, Ballyboden from 1986–2000.

He became a schoolteacher and joined the Irish National Teachers' Organisation (INTO). Within the union, he was a staff representative, chairperson of his branch, and later chair of INTO's district 8 (Wicklow and South Dublin). In 2004, he was elected to the union's Central Executive Committee. In 2016 he was elected Vice-President, before serving as President during 2017–2018.

Boyle was elected as general secretary of INTO in late 2018, defeating Alison Gilliland and Deirdre O'Connor, and took up the post in 2019. At the time, he was principal of St Colmcille's Junior National School in Knocklyon, Dublin where he had worked since 2000.

== Personal life ==
Boyle and his wife Carmel live in Templeogue, Dublin. He was previously Chairperson of Ballyboden Wanderers GAA Club.

Trade union offices
Preceded by Rosena Jordan	President of the Irish National Teachers' Organisation; 2017–2018	Succeeded by Joe Killeen
Preceded by Sheila Nunan	General Secretary of the Irish National Teachers' Organisation; 2019–present	Succeeded by Incumbent
