= 1970 United Kingdom general election in Northern Ireland =

- 18 June 1970

All 12 Northern Ireland seats in the House of Commons
- Turnout: 76.6% (▲10.5 pp)
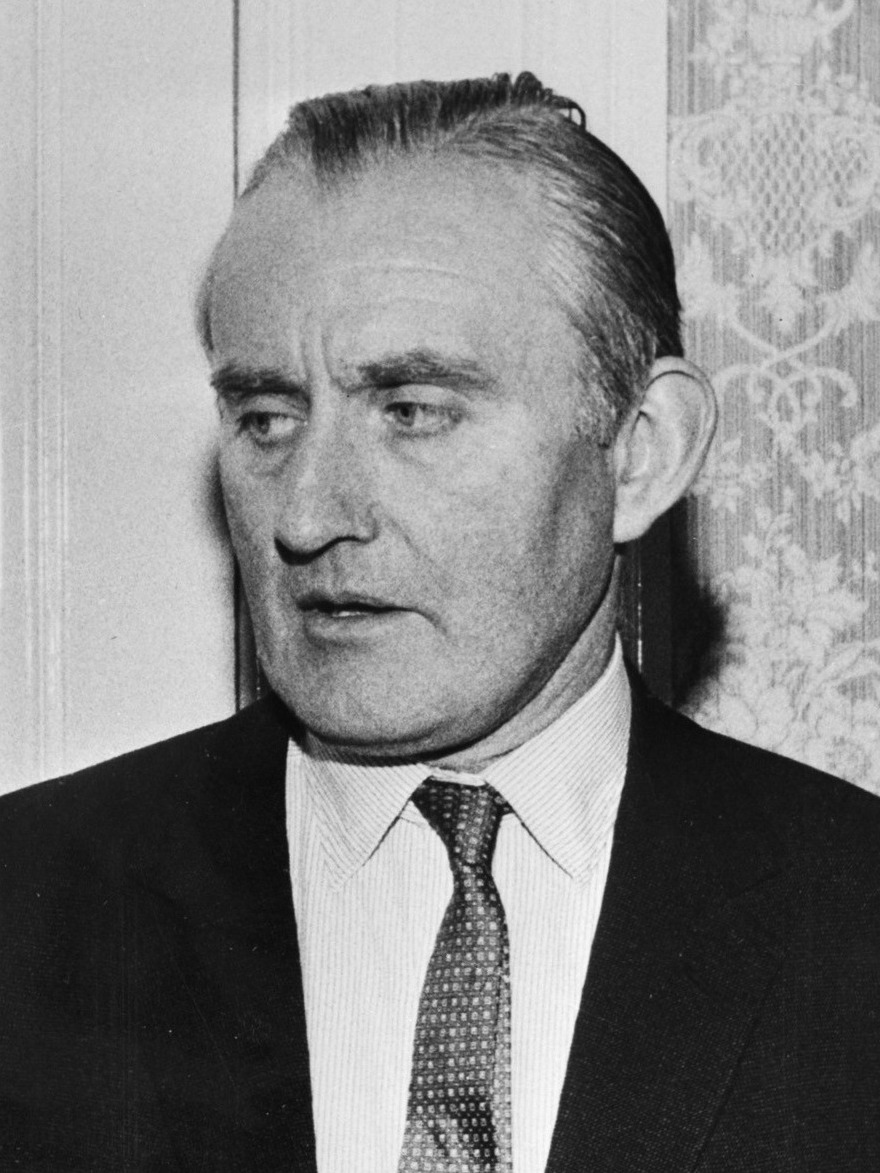

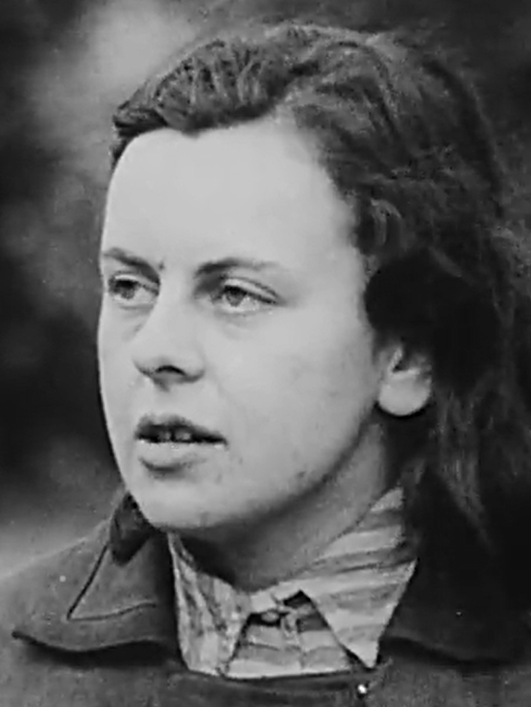

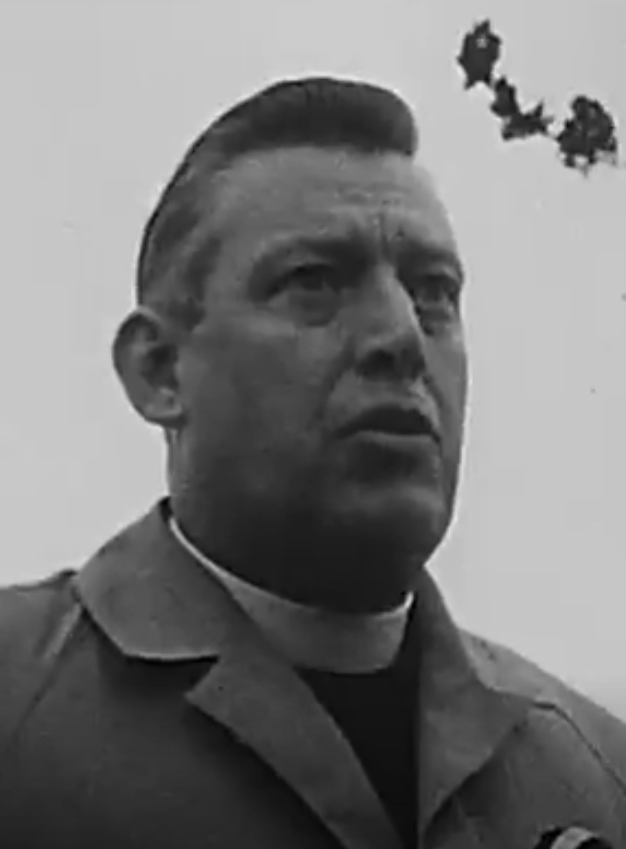
	First party	Second party
Leader	James Chichester-Clark	Bernadette Devlin (De facto)
Party	UUP	Unity
Alliance	Conservative
Leader since	1969	1969
Leader's seat	Sat in Stormont	Ran in Mid Ulster (won) (Note: Devlin initially won the seat in a by-election in 1969 after the death of UUP Member of Parliament George Forrest as a member of Unity. Unity was the label for a series of electoral pacts by nationalist, republican and socialist candidates. Devlin was therefore the organisation's only MP prior, and her retaining the seat represented a gain since 1966.)
Last election	11 seats, 61.8%	0 seats, 2.5%
Seats won	8	2
Seat change	▼3	▲2
Popular vote	422,041	140,930
Percentage	54.2%	18.1%
Swing	▼7.6 pp	▲15.6 pp
	Third party	Fourth party
		RLP
Leader	Ian Paisley	Gerry Fitt
Party	Protestant Unionist	Republican Labour
Leader since	1966	1964
Leader's seat	Ran in Antrim North (won)	Belfast West
Last election	Did not stand	1 seats, 4.4%
Seats won	1	1
Seat change	▲1	Steady
Popular vote	35,303	30,649
Percentage	4.5%	3.9%
Swing	New party	▼0.5 pp

On 18 June 1970, the 1970 United Kingdom general election was held in Northern Ireland, to elect all 630 members of the House of Commons, with 12 constituencies being in Northern Ireland.

This was the first general election in which people could vote from the age of eighteen years, after passage of the Representation of the People Act the previous year, and the first UK general election in which party affiliations of candidates were put on the ballot papers. The closing of the polls was also extended from 9.00 pm to 10.00 pm.

The Ulster Unionists lost seats to the Protestant Unionist Party led by Ian Paisley, moderator of the Free Presbyterian Church of Ulster, and to Unity, a nationalist organisation which had won a by-election in 1969.

In the election as a whole, the Labour Party failed to return to government and the Conservative Party, which included the Ulster Unionists, formed a government led by Edward Heath as Prime Minister. This was the last parliament where the UUP took the Conservative whip in the House of Commons, breaking with them after the Parliament of Northern Ireland was suspended by the Northern Ireland (Temporary Provisions) Act 1972.

== Candidates ==
Below is a table summarising the candidates of the 1970 general election in Northern Ireland.

Affiliation	Candidates
Ulster Unionist Party	12
Northern Ireland Labour Party	7
Unity	5
Ulster Liberal Party	4
Independent Unionist	3
Protestant Unionist Party	2
National Democratic Party	2
Independent	2
Republican Labour Party	1
Derry Labour	1 (Note: Candidate Eamonn McCann stood in Londonderry.)
National Socialist	1 (Note: Candidate Phelim O'Neill stood in Mid Ulster.)
Total	40

== Results ==
Party	Seats					Aggregate Votes		
Party	Total	Gains	Losses	Net	Of total (%)	Total	Of total (%)	Change (%)
UUP	8	0	3	▼3	66.7	422,041	54.2	▼7.6
Unity	2	2	0	▲2	16.7	140,930	18.1	▲15.6
NI Labour	0	0	0	Steady	—	98,194	12.6	▲0.4
Protestant Unionist	1	New		▲1	8.3	35,303	4.5	New
Republican Labour	1	0	0	Steady	8.3	30,649	3.9	▼0.5
Ind. Unionist	0	Did not stand in 1966			—	17,787	2.3	—N/a
Ulster Liberal	0	0	0	Steady	—	12,005	1.4	▼3.5
National Democratic	0	New			—	10,349	1.3	New
Derry Labour	0	New			—	7,565	0.1	New
Independent	0	Did not stand in 1966			—	4,092	0.5	—N/a
National Socialist	0	New			—	198	0.0	New
Blank and invalid votes						2,176	—	—
Total	12			0	100.0	779,113 (Note: All valid votes excluding spoiled votes.)	100.0	0.0
Registered voters, and turnout						1,017,193	76.6	▲10.5

Popular vote
UUP	54.2%
Unity	18.1%
NI Labour	12.6%
Protestant Unionist	4.5%
Republican Labour	3.9%
Ulster Liberal	1.5%
Nat. Democratic	1.3%
Other	3.8%

Parliamentary seats
UUP	66.7%
Unity	16.7%
Protestant Unionist	8.3%
Republican Labour	8.3%

== MPs elected ==
Constituency	Party	MP
Antrim North	Protestant Unionist	Ian Paisley
Antrim South	UUP	James Molyneaux
Armagh	UUP	John Maginnis
Belfast East	UUP	Stanley McMaster
Belfast North	UUP	Stratton Mills
Belfast South	UUP	Rafton Pounder
Belfast West	Republican Labour	Gerry Fitt
Down North	UUP	Jim Kilfedder
Down South	UUP	Lawrence Orr
Fermanagh and South Tyrone	Unity	Francis McManus
Londonderry	UUP	Robin Chichester-Clark
Mid Ulster	Unity	Bernadette Devlin

== See also ==
- 1970 United Kingdom general election in England
- 1970 United Kingdom general election in Scotland
- 1970 United Kingdom general election in Wales
