= Brian Campfield =

Brian Campfield is a trade unionist from Northern Ireland.

Campfield began working for the Northern Ireland Public Service Alliance (NIPSA) in 1978. During the 1980s, he was the Communist Party of Ireland's officer with responsibility for Northern Ireland, and in 1989 he and Michael O'Riordan visited East Germany to take part in celebrations of the country's fortieth anniversary, shortly before the fall of the Berlin Wall. Around that time, he was elected as President of Belfast Trades Union Council, serving until the 2010s.

In the 2000s, Campfield became Deputy General Secretary of NIPSA, and in 2009 he won election to the Irish Congress of Trade Unions' (ICTU) Executive Council. He became General Secretary of NIPSA in 2010, defeating Kieran Bannon in the election, remaining in post until his retirement in 2015. That year, he became President of ICTU for a two-year term.

Trade union offices
Preceded by Joe Cooper	President of Belfast Trades Union Council; 1980s–2010s	Succeeded by Paddy Mackle
Preceded by John Corey	General Secretary of the Northern Ireland Public Service Alliance; 2010–2015	Succeeded by Alison Millar
Preceded by John Douglas	President of the Irish Congress of Trade Unions; 2015–2017	Succeeded by Sheila Nunan
