= Catherine Mahon =

First women president of the Irish National Teachers Organisation

- Born: 15 May 1869; Laccah, north Co. Tipperary, Ireland
- Died: 27 February 1948 (aged 78); Balbriggan, Co. Dublin, Ireland
- Known for: First woman president of the Irish National Teachers' Organisation

Catherine Mahon (1869–1948) was the first woman president of the Irish National Teachers' Organisation.

== Early life and teaching career ==
Catherine Mahon was born in Laccah, County Tipperary, on 15 May 1869 to thirty-seven-year-old labourer James Mahon and his nineteen-year-old shop-keeping wife Winifred Mahon (née O'Meara). Catherine was the eldest of seven children. Her education was at Carrig national school before going to secondary school with the Sisters of Mercy in Birr, where she then worked as a monitor from October 1884. At the time, this was a way to gain a teacher qualification. She completed her training by correspondence and sat the final examination in 1890. She taught for a short time in Tulla Convent in County Clare. Most of her teaching life was spent in Tipperary – at Nenagh convent and as principal of Glenculloo. Mahon was principal from September 1891 to April 1892 in a small school with thirty pupils in Glenculloo before moving on to be principal of Carrig national school.

== Irish National Teachers Organisation ==
Mahon was a member of both the Gaelic League and the Irish Women's Franchise League. While she was a non-militant member she expressed support in The Irish Citizen. In 1906, Mahon began her involvement with the teachers trade union and joined the Birr Association and made a speech about equal pay at the Irish National Teachers Organisation annual congress. She then pointed out the lack of women on the INTO executive. Arguing the point she put herself forward for consideration for the position of Vice-President of the association in March 1907 and, although she wasn't elected, the question was so public that the INTO created new positions on the executive for women and offered one to Mahon.

In the first years of her involvement, Mahon was successful in a number of her goals, she increased recruitment and prevented women teachers being forced to cover Laundry and Cookery as subjects. When the Birrell grant was adopted in the summer of 1908, Mahon pointed out that the principal of equal pay had been established, as the grant was distributed to all teachers. Thus she claimed the precedent was made.

In April 1911, she was elected to the position of Vice-President unopposed. That year her goal was to prevent teachers on maternity leave to be required to provide their substitute at their own expense. In 1912, Mahon was elected the first woman president of the INTO. Almost immediately there was a crisis with the dismissal of the vice president Edmond Mansfield and issues between the INTO and the board of education. Mahon was sent to London to request the chief secretary Augustine Birrell to hold an inquiry. Although the secretary was biased against her position, he admitted her statement presented the case well and the Dill commission was set up.

Mahon was re-elected in 1913 despite he usual one term assumption. The teachers' paper, Irish School Weekly, in 14 December 1912 claimed "the general who has in every encounter routed the enemy's cavalry, must be retained at the head of the forces." This allowed her to give evidence as president to the Dill Commission which went on to vindicate the teachers and recommend changes but refused to recommend the reinstatement of Mansfield. As a result, the following year she resigned from the executive. She stepped down Easter 1916. She was questioned for her vocal support of the Easter rising.

An issue that arose in her final year on the executive was the War bonus, which granted men double the pay of women. Mahon protested this and declared success in November 1916. In 1919, she criticized the Education bill by Ian MacPherson and called the INTO executive British apologists. She made similar accusations against INTO's president and the general secretary T. J. O'Connell. As a result, in 1920 she was charged with libel. Mahon refused to accept the British court's jurisdiction but once she was silenced the INTO dropped the case. She stayed out of public life on a national level from then on.

Another woman was not elected to be president of the INTO until Kathleen Clarke in 1945.

== Later life ==
Mahon was president of the Tipperary Cottage Tenants’ Association. She was also a member of Fianna Fáil from its foundation. She retired at the end of the school year in July 1934 and went on to be the first woman elected to the county council in North Tipperary where she remained for three years before resigning. After that, Mahon moved to Dublin, where she lived with her mother and two widowed sisters in Balbriggan from 1937. There she was involved with the local Red Cross. It was there she died and was buried.
