= 1970 United Kingdom local elections =

Local elections in United Kingdom in the year 1970

Local elections were held in the United Kingdom in 1970. In April, elections were held to the Greater London Council and 13 county councils. In May there were elections to 83 county boroughs, 259 municipal boroughs and 521 urban district councils. There were also elections to Scottish burghs.

The results showed a substantial recovery for the Labour Party, which had been in government since 1964 and had suffered heavy losses in council elections during the intervening years. The Liberals turned in their worst performance since Clement Davies was party leader. The Scottish National Party's vote was halved as a result of the pro-Labour swing in Scotland.

Prime Minister Harold Wilson subsequently called a general election in June of that year, which the Labour Party lost contrary to the expectations of most opinion polls.

== See also ==
- 1970 Greater London Council election
- 1970 Scottish local elections
- 1970 United Kingdom general election
