= Opinion polling for the 1970 United Kingdom general election =

In the run-up to the 1970 general election, various organisations carried out opinion polling to gauge voting intention. Results of such polls are displayed in this article. These opinion polls range from the previous election on 31 March 1966 until polling day on 18 June 1970.

== Polling results ==
All data is from PollBase.

=== 1970 ===
Fieldwork	Pollster	Client	Lab	Con	Lib	Lead
18 Jun 1970	1970 general election		43.1	46.0	7.5	2.9
14-16 Jun	Harris	Daily Express	48.0	46.0	5.0	2.0
14-16 Jun	Gallup	Daily Telegraph	49.0	42.0	7.5	7.0
13-17 Jun	ORC	Evening Standard	45.5	46.5	6.5	1.0
12-16 Jun	NOP	Daily Mail	48.1	44.0	6.4	4.1
11-14 Jun	Marplan	The Times	50.2	41.5	7.0	8.7
14 Jun	Harris	Daily Express	47.0	45.0	7.0	2.0
7-11 Jun	Gallup	Daily Telegraph	48.0	45.5	5.5	2.5
3-7 Jun	NOP	Daily Mail	51.6	39.2	7.9	12.4
7 Jun	Harris	Daily Express	49.0	42.0	8.0	7.0
11 Jun	ORC	Evening Standard	49.0	42.0	8.0	7.0
7 Jun	ORC	Sunday Times	47.0	45.0	7.0	2.0
6 Jun	Marplan	The Times	48.1	44.4	6.2	3.7
4 Jun	ORC	Evening Standard	47.5	43.0	8.0	4.5
3 Jun	Harris	Daily Express	48.0	43.0	7.0	5.0
31-4 May	Gallup	Daily Telegraph	49.5	44.0	5.0	5.5
27-31 May	NOP	Daily Mail	49.5	44.4	4.8	5.1
23-26 May	Gallup	Daily Telegraph	50.0	44.5	4.5	5.5
31 May	ORC	Sunday Times	45.0	47.0	5.0	2.0
20-26 May	NOP	Daily Mail	48.0	44.8	5.9	3.2
28 May	ORC	Evening Standard	45.0	43.0	10.0	2.0
21 May	ORC	Evening Standard	45.5	44.5	7.0	1.0
13-17 May	Gallup	Daily Telegraph	49.5	42.5	6.5	7.0
20 May	Harris	Daily Express	48.0	46.0	6.0	2.0
19 May	Marplan	The Times	47.2	44.5	6.6	2.7
5-11 May	NOP	Daily Mail	47.6	44.4	6.7	3.2
5-9 May	Gallup	Daily Telegraph	49.0	41.5	7.5	7.5
Apr	Harris	Daily Express	46.0	44.0	7.0	2.0
Apr	ORC	Evening Standard	41.0	47.0	9.0	6.0
21-27 Apr	NOP	Daily Mail	44.4	47.3	6.9	2.9
17-19 Apr	Gallup	Daily Telegraph	42.5	47.0	7.5	4.5
7-13 Apr	NOP	Daily Mail	41.3	49.7	7.5	8.4
Apr	Marplan	The Times	46.0	45.2	6.8	0.8
Mar	Harris	Daily Express	42.0	49.0	7.0	7.0
Mar	ORC	Evening Standard	41.0	48.0	8.0	7.0
13-15 Mar	Gallup	Daily Telegraph	41.0	46.5	9.5	5.5
4-9 Mar	NOP	Daily Mail	42.0	49.5	7.1	7.5
Feb	Harris	Daily Express	40.0	52.0	6.0	12.0
Feb	ORC	Evening Standard	38.0	50.0	9.0	12.0
12-15 Feb	Gallup	Daily Telegraph	41.0	48.0	9.0	7.0
4-9 Feb	NOP	Daily Mail	40.6	51.2	7.1	10.6
Jan	Harris	Daily Express	40.0	51.0	8.0	11.0
Jan	ORC	Evening Standard	37.0	52.0	9.0	15.0
15-18 Jan	Gallup	Daily Telegraph	41.0	48.5	7.0	7.5
7-12 Jan	NOP	Daily Mail	41.7	48.4	8.4	6.7
Jan	Marplan	The Times	38.6	51.3	8.7	12.7

=== 1969 ===
Fieldwork	Pollster	Client	Lab	Con	Lib	Lead
Dec	ORC	Evening Standard	40.0	49.0	8.0	9.0
11-14 Dec	Gallup	Daily Telegraph	39.5	50.0	9.0	10.5
10-15 Dec	NOP	Daily Mail	44.4	47.6	7.1	3.2
Nov	Harris	Daily Express	40.0	50.0	8.0	10.0
Nov	ORC	Evening Standard	39.0	48.0	10.0	9.0
13-16 Nov	Gallup	Daily Telegraph	41.5	45.0	10.0	3.5
10-17 Nov	NOP	Daily Mail	40.9	48.6	8.9	7.7
5-10 Nov	NOP	Daily Mail	42.2	48.1	8.1	5.9
Oct	Harris	Daily Express	39.0	51.0	9.0	12.0
Oct	ORC	Evening Standard	42.0	46.0	10.0	4.0
16-19 Oct	Gallup	Daily Telegraph	44.5	46.5	7.0	2.0
8-13 Oct	NOP	Daily Mail	40.1	50.1	8.0	10.0
Oct	Marplan	The Times	42.1	45.6	9.8	3.5
Sep	Harris	Daily Express	35.0	52.0	11.0	17.0
Sep	ORC	Evening Standard	37.0	48.0	12.0	11.0
17-22 Sep	NOP	Daily Mail	37.5	47.5	12.7	10.0
11-14 Sep	Gallup	Daily Telegraph	37.0	46.5	13.0	9.5
3-8 Sep	NOP	Daily Mail	33.7	53.3	11.0	19.6
Aug	ORC	Evening Standard	33.0	51.0	13.0	18.0
14-17 Aug	Gallup	Daily Telegraph	34.5	47.0	15.5	12.5
13-18 Aug	NOP	Daily Mail	35.2	50.7	12.2	15.5
Jul	ORC	Evening Standard	33.0	52.0	13.0	19.0
23-28 Jul	NOP	Daily Mail	34.2	52.5	10.4	18.3
10-13 Jul	Gallup	Daily Telegraph	31.5	55.0	11.0	23.5
9-14 Jul	NOP	Daily Mail	36.6	52.0	10.0	15.4
Jul	Marplan	The Times	31.9	51.0	13.6	19.1
Jun	ORC	Evening Standard	33.0	54.0	10.0	21.0
25-30 Jun	NOP	Daily Mail	36.1	51.3	9.4	15.2
13-16 Jun	Gallup	Daily Telegraph	35.0	51.0	12.0	16.0
4-9 Jun	NOP	Daily Mail	34.9	52.0	10.1	17.1
May	ORC	Evening Standard	32.0	53.0	13.0	21.0
15-18 May	Gallup	Daily Telegraph	30.5	52.0	13.5	21.5
14-19 May	NOP	Daily Mail	31.5	54.6	11.3	23.1
30-5 Apr	NOP	Daily Mail	31.8	54.4	11.4	22.6
Apr	ORC	Evening Standard	31.0	54.0	12.0	23.0
18-22 Apr	Gallup	Daily Telegraph	30.5	51.0	13.0	20.5
9-14 Apr	NOP	Daily Mail	32.9	54.8	10.3	21.9
Apr	Marplan	The Times	28.1	54.9	13.8	26.8
Mar	ORC	Evening Standard	31.0	56.0	10.0	25.0
26-31 Mar	NOP	Daily Mail	32.3	55.4	9.5	23.1
14-16 Mar	Gallup	Daily Telegraph	34.0	52.5	10.0	18.5
6-11 Mar	NOP	Daily Mail	35.8	51.7	10.1	15.9
Feb	ORC	Evening Standard	32.0	55.0	10.0	23.0
20-25 Feb	NOP	Daily Mail	32.5	54.6	10.0	22.1
13-16 Feb	Gallup	Daily Telegraph	32.0	54.5	11.0	22.5
6-11 Feb	NOP	Daily Mail	32.1	56.7	8.9	24.6
Jan	ORC	Evening Standard	33.0	49.0	13.0	16.0
23-28 Jan	NOP	Daily Mail	36.9	47.3	12.6	10.4
9-14 Jan	NOP	Daily Mail	32.5	52.2	12.1	19.7
9-12 Jan	Gallup	Daily Telegraph	31.0	53.0	11.5	22.0
Jan	Marplan	The Times	32.2	52.3	12.1	20.1

=== 1968 ===
Fieldwork	Pollster	Client	Lab	Con	Lib	Lead
Dec	ORC	Evening Standard	28.0	55.0	13.0	27.0
11-16 Dec	NOP	Daily Mail	33.3	55.0	8.4	21.7
5-9 Dec	Gallup	Daily Telegraph	29.5	55.0	11.0	25.5
Nov	ORC	Evening Standard	38.0	47.0	11.0	9.0
7-10 Nov	Gallup	Daily Telegraph	32.0	50.5	14.0	18.5
6-11 Nov	NOP	Daily Mail	37.7	50.8	8.7	13.1
Oct	ORC	Evening Standard	37.0	49.0	10.0	12.0
23-28 Oct	NOP	Daily Mail	42.0	46.0	8.9	4.0
9-14 Oct	NOP	Daily Mail	39.7	49.1	8.8	9.4
Oct	Gallup	Daily Telegraph	39.0	47.0	9.5	8.0
25 Oct	Marplan	The Times	39.2	47.1	9.3	7.9
Sep	ORC	Evening Standard	32.0	51.0	13.0	19.0
18-23 Sep	NOP	Daily Mail	37.2	47.8	10.8	10.6
12-15 Sep	Gallup	Daily Telegraph	37.0	47.0	11.5	10.0
4-9 Sep	NOP	Daily Mail	39.5	49.0	8.7	9.5
Aug	ORC	Evening Standard	37.0	49.0	10.0	12.0
14-19 Aug	NOP	Daily Mail	37.0	47.8	11.7	10.8
Aug	Gallup	Daily Telegraph	34.5	49.5	11.5	15.0
Jul	ORC	Evening Standard	34.0	49.0	11.0	15.0
17-22 Jul	NOP	Daily Mail	35.7	51.2	9.2	15.5
4-7 Jul	Gallup	Daily Telegraph	30.0	50.0	13.0	20.0
3-8 Jul	NOP	Daily Mail	35.5	49.4	11.4	13.9
Jun	ORC	Evening Standard	34.0	50.0	12.0	16.0
12-17 Jun	NOP	Daily Mail	33.3	52.8	9.3	19.5
7-9 Jun	Gallup	Daily Telegraph	28.0	51.5	14.0	23.5
May	ORC	Evening Standard	31.0	54.0	11.0	23.0
22-27 May	NOP	Daily Mail	33.0	51.2	11.5	18.2
10-13 May	Gallup	Daily Telegraph	28.0	56.0	11.0	28.0
1-6 May	NOP	Daily Mail	30.9	53.3	11.5	22.4
30-7 Apr	Gallup	Daily Telegraph	30.0	54.5	12.5	24.5
Apr	ORC	Evening Standard	28.0	56.0	11.0	28.0
3-8 Apr	NOP	Daily Mail	32.1	55.5	9.0	23.4
Mar	ORC	Evening Standard	35.0	48.0	12.0	13.0
6-11 Mar	NOP	Daily Mail	35.9	50.0	10.4	14.1
Mar	Gallup	Daily Telegraph	31.0	50.0	15.0	19.0
Feb	ORC	Evening Standard	34.0	50.0	11.0	16.0
7-12 Feb	NOP	Daily Mail	33.6	50.8	12.2	17.2
3-11 Feb	Gallup	Daily Telegraph	30.0	52.5	12.5	22.5
Jan	ORC	Evening Standard	34.0	51.0	11.0	17.0
24-29 Jan	NOP	Daily Mail	34.8	53.6	9.9	18.8
6-14 Jan	Gallup	Daily Telegraph	39.5	45.0	11.0	5.5

=== 1967 ===
Fieldwork	Pollster	Client	Lab	Con	Lib	Lead
Dec	ORC	Evening Standard	36.0	47.0	12.0	11.0
9-17 Dec	Gallup	Daily Telegraph	32.0	49.5	12.0	17.5
6-11 Dec	NOP	Daily Mail	37.8	45.5	12.5	7.7
Nov	ORC	Evening Standard	39.0	46.0	10.0	7.0
Nov	Gallup	Daily Telegraph	36.0	46.5	11.5	10.5
15-20 Nov	NOP	Daily Mail	38.9	44.9	12.3	6.0
1-6 Nov	NOP	Daily Mail	38.6	46.8	11.6	8.2
Oct	ORC	Evening Standard	41.0	47.0	10.0	6.0
11-6 Oct	NOP	Daily Mail	44.4	42.5	10.7	1.9
Oct	Gallup	Daily Telegraph	38.0	45.0	14.0	7.0
27-2 Sep	NOP	Daily Mail	41.6	43.5	12.3	1.9
Sep	ORC	Evening Standard	40.0	45.0	11.0	5.0
13-18 Sep	NOP	Daily Mail	40.1	46.6	11.0	6.5
3-10 Sep	Gallup	Daily Telegraph	41.5	45.0	10.5	3.5
31-4 Aug	NOP	Daily Mail	41.5	47.0	9.9	5.5
Aug	ORC	Evening Standard	41.0	44.0	12.0	3.0
16-21 Aug	NOP	Daily Mail	41.3	45.9	10.1	4.6
6-13 Aug	Gallup	Daily Telegraph	42.0	43.0	13.0	1.0
Jul	ORC	Evening Standard	45.0	40.0	12.0	5.0
20-25 Jul	NOP	Daily Mail	44.1	43.1	10.9	1.0
6-11 Jul	NOP	Daily Mail	45.2	43.5	9.1	1.7
2-9 Jul	Gallup	Daily Telegraph	41.0	43.5	13.0	2.5
Jun	ORC	Evening Standard	46.0	42.0	10.0	4.0
22-27 Jun	NOP	Daily Mail	48.1	42.2	8.1	5.9
7-12 Jun	NOP	Daily Mail	46.0	42.8	9.2	3.2
5-11 Jun	Gallup	Daily Telegraph	41.0	48.0	9.5	7.0
May	ORC	Evening Standard	40.0	46.0	11.0	6.0
?-15 May	NOP	Daily Mail	43.3	45.6	8.4	2.3
8-14 May	Gallup	Daily Telegraph	40.0	46.5	12.0	6.5
19-24 Apr	NOP	Daily Mail	44.3	46.6	7.6	2.3
12-16 Apr	Gallup	Daily Telegraph	41.5	45.5	11.0	4.0
30-3 Mar	NOP	Daily Mail	49.3	38.3	10.8	11.0
27-5 Mar	Gallup	Daily Telegraph	42.5	42.5	12.5	Tie
15-20 Mar	NOP	Daily Mail	47.4	41.9	9.2	5.5
15-20 Feb	NOP	Daily Mail	45.0	41.7	11.1	3.3
6-12 Feb	Gallup	Daily Telegraph	48.5	37.0	13.0	11.5
1-6 Feb	NOP	Daily Mail	47.4	39.6	11.2	7.8
18-23 Jan	NOP	Daily Mail	48.2	39.0	11.7	9.2
9-15 Jan	Gallup	Daily Telegraph	45.5	42.5	10.5	3.0
4-9 Jan	NOP	Daily Mail	46.4	40.0	11.7	6.4

=== 1966 ===
Fieldwork	Pollster	Client	Lab	Con	Lib	Lead
6-12 Dec	NOP	Daily Mail	47.0	42.5	8.6	4.5
5-11 Dec	Gallup	Daily Telegraph	46.0	42.0	10.5	4.0
23-28 Nov	NOP	Daily Mail	46.6	42.1	9.4	4.5
9-14 Nov	NOP	Daily Mail	46.3	39.0	12.9	7.3
7-13 Nov	Gallup	Daily Telegraph	42.0	44.0	12.5	2.0
Oct	Gallup	Daily Telegraph	44.5	43.0	11.5	1.5
5-10 Oct	NOP	Daily Mail	51.3	36.0	11.3	15.3
21-26 Sep	NOP	Daily Mail	46.6	39.5	12.2	7.1
7-12 Sep	NOP	Daily Mail	50.5	38.4	9.9	12.1
2-6 Sep	Gallup	Daily Telegraph	45.0	42.5	11.5	2.5
29-2 Aug	Gallup	Daily Telegraph	44.0	44.5	10.5	0.5
27-1 Jul	NOP	Daily Mail	48.1	38.8	11.4	9.3
14-19 Jul	Gallup	Daily Telegraph	48.5	41.0	8.5	7.5
6-11 Jul	NOP	Daily Mail	53.4	36.6	9.0	16.8
22-27 Jun	NOP	Daily Mail	55.2	37.3	6.8	17.9
3-7 Jun	Gallup	Daily Telegraph	52.0	39.5	7.5	12.5
6-10 May	Gallup	Daily Telegraph	53.5	35.5	10.0	18.0
5-9 May	NOP	Daily Mail	55.2	34.1	9.6	21.1
21-15 Apr	NOP	Daily Mail	55.0	35.6	8.7	19.4
14-19 Apr	Gallup	Daily Telegraph	54.5	35.5	8.5	19.0
31 Mar 1966	1966 general election		48.0	41.9	8.5	6.1
