= Joe O'Toole =

Irish former politician (born 1947)

Senator
- In office 25 April 1987 – 25 May 2011
- Constituency: National University

Personal details
- Born: 20 July 1947 (age 79) Dingle, County Kerry, Ireland
- Party: Independent
- Education: St Patrick's College, Dublin

Joseph John O'Toole (born 20 July 1947) is an Irish former independent politician, who was a member of Seanad Éireann from 1987 to 2011.

He was born and brought up in Dingle, County Kerry, O'Toole was a teacher for ten years and then a school principal in County Dublin. From 1990 to 2001, he was appointed General Secretary of the Irish National Teachers' Organisation (INTO), and from 2001 to 2003, he was President of the Irish Congress of Trade Unions (ICTU). He lives in Kilsallaghan, County Dublin.

He was first elected to the 18th Seanad in 1987 for the National University (NUI) constituency, and was re-elected by the same constituency at each subsequent election until he retired from politics at the 2011 Seanad election.

In the Seanad, he was a member of the Parliamentary Joint Finance Committee. His autobiography "Looking under stones: roots, family and a Dingle childhood", was published in 2003.

Trade union offices
Preceded by Gerry Quigley	General Secretary of the Irish National Teachers' Organisation; 1990–2001	Succeeded by John Carr
Preceded by Inez McCormack	President of the Irish Congress of Trade Unions; 2001–2003	Succeeded by Brendan Mackin
