= 1970 United Kingdom general election in Wales =

- 18 June 1970

All 36 Welsh seats to the House of Commons
- Turnout: 77.4% (▼1.6 pp)
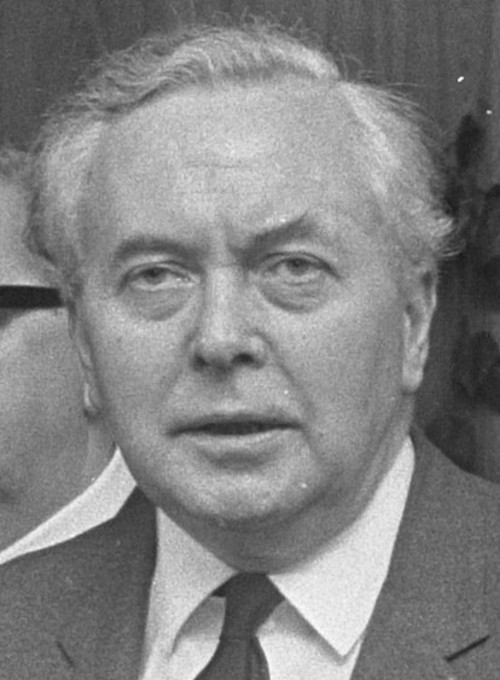

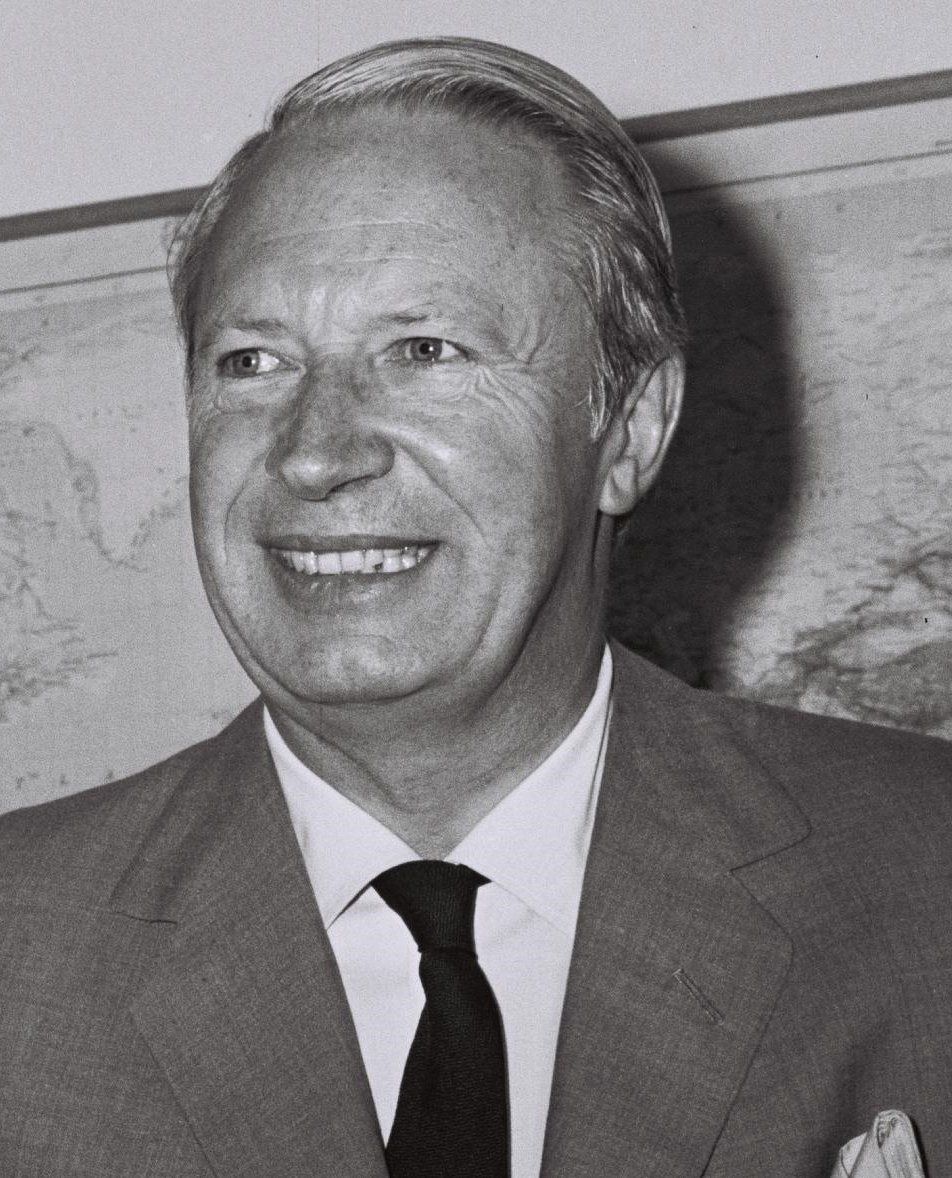

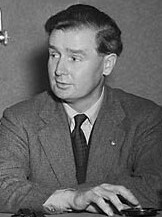
	First party	Second party
Leader	Harold Wilson	Edward Heath
Party	Labour	Conservative
Leader since	14 February 1963	28 July 1965
Leader's seat	Huyton	Bexley
Last election	32 seats, 60.7%	3 seats, 27.9%
Seats won	27	7
Seat change	▼5	▲4
Popular vote	781,941	419,884
Percentage	51.6%	27.7%
Swing	▼9.1 pp	▼0.2 pp
	Third party	Fourth party
	Lib
Leader	Jeremy Thorpe	Gwynfor Evans
Party	Liberal	Plaid Cymru
Leader since	18 January 1967	1 August 1945
Leader's seat	North Devon	Ran in Carmarthen (defeated)
Last election	1 seat, 6.3%	0 seats, 4.3%
Seats won	1	0
Seat change	Steady	Steady
Popular vote	103,747	171,374
Percentage	6.8%	11.5%
Swing	▲0.5 pp	▲7.2 pp

On Thursday 18 June 1970, the 1970 United Kingdom general election was held in Wales, to elect all 635 members of the House of Commons, with 36 constituencies being in Wales.

This was the first general election in which people could vote from the age of eighteen years, after passage of the Representation of the People Act the previous year, and the first UK general election in which party affiliations of candidates were put on the ballot papers. The closing of the polls was also extended from 9.00 pm to 10.00 pm.

== Candidates ==
Below is a table summarising the candidates of the 1970 general election in Wales.

Affiliation	Candidates
Labour Party	36
Conservative and Unionist Party	36
Plaid Cymru	36
Liberal Party	19
Communist Party of Great Britain	8
Independent Labour	1 (Note: Candidate S. O. Davies stood in Merthyr Tydfil.)
Democratic Party	1 (Note: Leader Desmond Donnelly stood in Pembrokeshire.)
National Front	1 (Note: Candidate George W. Parsons stood in Cardiff South East.)
Total	138

== Analysis ==
The election saw the Labour Party win the most votes and seats in Wales.

Although Plaid Cymru had received its largest vote share in the party's history at this election when compared with previous elections, the party failed to obtain any seats in Wales. The party's leader Gwynfor Evans did not retain his seat in Caerfyrddin, which he had initially won from Labour in the 1966 Carmarthen by-election. The seat was won by Gwynoro Jones, thereby retaining it for Labour when compared to 1966.

Although Labour retained being the largest party in Wales by seats, it lost Cardiff North, Conwy, Monmouth and Pembrokeshire to the Conservative Party. Nicholas Edwards, who was elected in Pembrokeshire at this election, would go on to serve as Secretary of State for Wales during the first two terms of the Thatcher government. Future leader of the Labour Party Neil Kinnock also entered Parliament in this election in the constituency of Bedwellty.

Labour also lost Merthyr Tydfil to S. O. Davies. After being de-selected by the Labour Party to contest the seat in the 1970 general election, Davies stood and won as an independent. Davies, however, would pass away in 1972, leading to Labour retaking the seat in the 1972 Merthyr Tydfil by-election.

The Liberal Party retained its seat of Montgomeryshire. The MP was Emlyn Hooson.

== Results ==
Below is a table summarising the results of the 1970 general election in Wales.

Party	Seats					Aggregate Votes		
Party	Total	Gains	Losses	Net	Of total (%)	Total	Of total (%)	Change (%)
Labour	27	0	5	▼5	75.0	781,941	51.6	▼9.1
Conservative	7	4	0	▲4	19.4	419,884	27.7	▼0.2
Plaid Cymru	0	0	0	Steady	—	175,016	11.5	▲7.2
Liberal	1	0	0	Steady	2.8	103,747	6.8	▲0.5
Independent Labour	1 (Note: After being de-selected by the Labour Party to contest the seat, S. O. Davies won as an independent in Merthyr Tydfil.)	Did not stand in 1966		▲1	2.8	16,701	0.4	—N/a
Democratic	0	New			—	11,824	0.8	New
Communist	0	0	0	Steady	—	6,459	0.4	▼0.5
National Front	0	New			—	982	0.1	New
Blank and invalid votes						2,518	—	—
Total	36			0	100.0	1,516,554 (Note: All valid votes excluding spoiled votes.)	100.0	0.0
Registered voters, and turnout						1,958,778	77.4	▼1.6

Popular vote
Labour	51.6%
Conservative	27.7%
Plaid Cymru	11.5%
Liberal	6.8%
Other	2.4%

Parliament seats
Labour	75.0%
Conservative	19.4%
Liberal	2.8%
Other	2.8%

== See also ==
- 1970 United Kingdom general election in England
- 1970 United Kingdom general election in Scotland
- 1970 United Kingdom general election in Northern Ireland
- List of MPs for constituencies in Wales (1970–February 1974)
