= Northern Ireland Public Service Alliance =

Public sector trade union

NIPSA
- Northern Ireland Public Service Alliance
- Founded: 1922 as Belfast and District Public Officers' Association
- Headquarters: Harkin House, Belfast, Northern Ireland
- Location: Northern Ireland
- Members: 46,150
- Key people: Paul Dale (President) Brendan Mulholland (Vice President) Jane Scott (Honorary Treasurer) Carmel Gates (Gen. Secretary)
- Affiliations: ICTU
- Website: www.nipsa.org.uk

The Northern Ireland Public Service Alliance (NIPSA) is a trade union in Northern Ireland affiliated to the Irish Congress of Trade Unions. It is the largest trade union in Northern Ireland, with around 46,000 members, and is organised into two groups, the Civil Service Group, for the staff of public bodies employed on civil service terms and conditions, and the Public Officers Group, for employees of education and library boards, health and social services boards, the Northern Ireland Housing Executive, district councils, other public bodies and voluntary organisations.

The current General Secretary is Carmel Gates, and the President is Paul Dale. NIPSA has three Deputy General Secretaries: Patrick Mulholland, Ryan Wilson and Alan Law.

In May 2026, Carmel Gates announced her intention to retire as General Secretary, prompting an election to appoint her successor. Maria Morgan was subsequently elected General Secretary and is currently serving as General Secretary-elect during the transition period ahead of Gates' retirement.

== History ==
=== Early origins ===
In the wake of the First World War and Partition of Ireland, the Northern Ireland Civil Service was organised out of the remnants of the Dublin Castle administration. The Unionist Government set up six Ministries (Finance, Home Affairs, Education, Agriculture, Commerce and Labour) and a Prime Minister's Office. It essentially mirrored the set-up in Great Britain, with the Permanent Secretary of the Ministry of Finance becoming the Head of the Northern Ireland Civil Service.

The earliest incarnation of what was to become NIPSA was the Belfast and District Public Officers’ Association (BDPOA), but it was short-lived, down to its own success, when it opened a Derry branch and became the Ulster Public Officers’ Association. Its first General Secretary was John Walters.

In 1922, another organisation, The Association of Established Civil Servants, sprung up and sought Whitley recognition from the NICS, but this was met with resistance, not least from HM Pollock, the then Minister for Finance, who instead suggested the establishment of House Committees with separate employee and employer sides, but this never materialised.

The Government eventually set up a Civil Service Representative Council which was a shadow of the Whitley model campaigned for by the AECS. It had a purely consultative role.

In 1929, the CSRC became the subject of a parliamentary row when Nationalist MP Patrick O’Neill informed Minister Pollock during a debate that not one of the CSRC's 17 was a Roman Catholic. Its legitimacy was continually knocked by the AECS but it remained the only staff side mechanism recognised by the Government.

=== ACSGNI ===
The AECS resigned all its members from the CSCR in 1933 which led to the dissolution of both organisations. They were replaced less than six months later by a new organisation, the Association of Civil Servants in the Government of Northern Ireland. It took until 1937 to receive recognition from the Government but it remained the principal staff association of Civil Servants until 1950.

=== NICSA ===
The AGSGNI became the Northern Ireland Civil Servants’ Association in 1950. It organised 64 branches across Northern Ireland, and although most remained geographically based a significant number retained a specialised nature, (e.g. telephonists and cleaners).

In 1953, the Association boasted a growing membership of 5,000. Brendan Harkin, a former organiser with the Electrical Trades Union and convenor with the Confederation of Shipbuilding & Engineering Unions (Confed), was appointed NICSA Assistant Secretary.

=== NI Public Service Alliance ===
The NICSA, AECS and Civil Service Association merged in 1971 to become NIPSA, with Brendan Harkin as its first General Secretary.

== Organisation ==
The supreme decision-making authority of NIPSA is its Annual Delegate Conference which is held each year in late-May to early-June. The function of conference is to commend NIPSA's annual report, financial statements and to set NIPSA policy for the upcoming year. Every NIPSA branch is entitled to send delegates to the conference, the number of delegates dependent on the number of members within each branch.

Separately NIPSA is divided between two distinct sections, the Civil Service Group and the Public Officers’ Group, the former catering for those employed on NICS terms and conditions and the latter for employees of Health & Social Care Trusts, Education and Library Boards, the Northern Ireland Housing Executive and several other bodies.

=== General Council ===
Between conferences NIPSA's executive power rests with the annually elected General Council. The 25 member body is elected through a secret ballot of the Union's 46,000 members.

There are two main groupings on the General Council, NIPSA Broad Left (now called Broad Left and Democracy Now) and NIPSA Unity (now styled as NIPSA Independents). According to a Fair Employment Tribunal decision in 2016, Unity "comprises members of the Communist Party of Ireland, members of Sinn Féin and others", while Broad Left "comprises members of the Socialist Party, the Socialist Workers Party, People Before Profit and others". Newton Emerson, writing in The Irish News, characterises Unity as "far left" and Broad Left as "even farther left". NIPSA Broad left has largely been the more electorally successful of the 2 factions, with candidates regularly winning election to officer posts but control of the general council has fluctuated between both factions. A new group, NIPSA Independents, has replaced Unity but remains largely aligned to the same politics as Unity and contains many of the same members.

=== Civil Service Group ===
The Civil Service Group's executive control is vested in its Annual Delegate Conference which formerly used to convene on the day preceding the NIPSA General Conference but now holds its annual conference in October or November. It is here that the Civil Service Group Executive is elected from an electoral college made up of attending branches. Despite what is often perceived as a Civil Service bias with NIPSA, it is actually the Civil Service Group which is the smaller of the two sections.

=== Public Officers' Group ===
The Public Officers' Group essentially mirrors that of the Civil Service Group but has not held a conference for election for several years. Its conference was held on the same day and its executive committee elected in a similar manner to that of the Civil Service Group.

== NIPSA Youth ==
Tentative moves have been made towards establishing NIPSA Youth as a viable Young Members movement, similar to the PCS Young Members group. PSA Youth has had a presence at events including General Conference, May Day rallies and the General Strike on 30 November 2011.

== Campaigns ==
NIPSA is involved in a wide spectrum of campaigns, ranging from domestic issues such as encouraging the non-payment of water charges to international problems like Justice for Colombia and Palestine through its Global Solidarity Committee. NIPSA recently engaged in high profile industrial action across the public sector in 2023 and 2024 to try and force a better budget settlement for N. Ireland and to achieve its goal of better pay awards for members across the public sector.

== Controversies ==
The union was heavily criticized by an employment tribunal in a case concerning 'entryism' by members of the Communist Party of Ireland. The tribunal noted NIPSA's tendency to sort out internal grievances though tribunals. The judgement said the case was part of a dispute between two factions; 'unity', which is associated with the Marxist Leninist CPI, and the 'broad left' which is associated with various Trotskyite parties, in the union which "has been a rich source of litigation over recent years". The tribunal stated that the two factions actually have little if any substantive political differences.

== General Secretaries ==
1971: Brendan Harkin
1978: Jim McCusker
2003: John Corey
2010: Brian Campfield
2015: Alison Millar
2021: Carmel Gates
2026: Maria Morgan

== See also ==
- List of Government departments and agencies in Northern Ireland
