= National Democratic Party (Northern Ireland) =

Defunct nationalist political party in Northern Ireland

- Leader: Gerry Quigley
- Founded: 1965
- Dissolved: 1970
- Preceded by: National Unity
- Succeeded by: Social Democratic and Labour Party
- Ideology: Socialism; Irish nationalism
- Political position: Centre-left

The National Democratic Party (NDP) was an Irish nationalist political party in Northern Ireland.

== Origins ==
The organisation's origins lay in National Unity, a political study group founded in 1959. It failed to unite nationalists as it had hoped, and so it worked with Gerry Quigley, Secretary of the Irish National Teachers' Organisation, to call a conference of all nationalists.

The conference was held on 19 April 1964 in Maghery. It was well attended, although Nationalist Party leader Eddie McAteer rejected his invitation, and other Nationalist MPs were reluctant to accept criticisms raised of them. The conference founded the National Political Front, with Anne McFadden as its secretary.

The National Political Front aimed to develop policy for the Nationalist Party and any other sympathetic politicians, and to play a role in selecting future nationalist candidates. Despite this, the Nationalist Party chose to organise its own convention to choose a candidate for Fermanagh and South Tyrone at the 1964 general election.

In the run-up to the election, McAteer wrote to leaders of other opposition parties to discuss forming a united opposition, and this produced talks with the Republican Labour Party. They released a joint programme entitled "39 Points", largely based on the demands of the National Political Front. However, the relationship between the Front and the Nationalists again soured before the end of 1964. As a result, some politicians resigned from the Nationalist Party, including John Hume.

== National Party ==
In February 1965, the National Political Front founded a new organisation, the National Party, at a conference in Belfast. Prominent Nationalist Party members McAteer and Gerry Lennon attended as observers. This new group was chaired by Quigley, and aimed to organise supporters of a united Ireland in urban areas, to link with reinvigorated Nationalist Party groups in rural areas. Indeed, they pointedly did not organise in areas which already had a Nationalist MP. In particular, they called on the Nationalist Party to adopt a constituency based structure with a party conference and agreed party programme.

== National Democratic Party ==
By June 1965, the Nationalist Party had taken no action on the issues raised by the National Party. The new group decided to maintain the pressure, and renamed itself the "National Democratic Party". Nationalist Senator Paddy McGill was concerned that the NDP would try to take over the Nationalist Party. McAteer decided to aim for a close relationship with the new group, noting that they shared the "39 Points" programme.

Closely associated with the new party was the National Democrats ginger group. This had the same aims as the NDP and was chaired by Ciaran McKeown.

At the 1965 Northern Ireland general election, former Independent Labour Group politician John Joseph Brennan won the constituency of Belfast Central, without facing any opposition. Among the party's candidates were future MPs Eddie McGrady and Alasdair McDonnell.

== Dissolution ==
The next few years saw the start of The Troubles, and great radicalisation among Irish nationalists. Brennan lost his seat in 1969. Hume founded the Social Democratic and Labour Party (SDLP), bringing together independent nationalist politicians elected in 1969 and some representatives of existing parties. A large number of NDP members left to join the SDLP - making up 80% of its first 400 members. Facing a massive drop in membership, the NDP dissolved itself in October 1970, passing a resolution that all members should join the SDLP. These members included political strategist Ben Caraher, who was to greatly influence the approach of the early SDLP.

== Note ==
The National Democratic Party had no connection to the National Democrats that fielded a candidate in the East Londonderry constituency in the 1997 general election, which was a UK-wide breakaway from the British National Front.
