= Gerry Quigley =

Irish trade unionist and political activist

Gerry Quigley (3 November 1928 – 23 December 2003) was a trade unionist and political activist in Northern Ireland.

Quigley grew up in the Donegall Pass area of Belfast. He studied at St Joseph's Training College before working as a primary school teacher.

Quigley was appointed Northern Secretary of the Irish National Teachers' Organisation (INTO) in 1954. In this role, he secured equal pay for women teachers and pay equivalence between Northern Irish teachers and those in England and Wales.

In 1964, Quigley worked with National Unity, an Irish nationalist political study group, to call a conference of all nationalists in Northern Ireland. This founded the National Political Front, and in 1965, Quigley became the first chair of its successor, the National Party, soon renamed the National Democratic Party.

In 1978, Quigley became the general secretary of INTO. He also served as the president of the Irish Congress of Trade Unions.

Trade union offices
| Preceded by Seán Brosnahan | General Secretary of the Irish National Teachers' Organisation; 1978–1990 | Succeeded by Joe O'Toole |
| Preceded by William Wallace | President of the Irish Congress of Trade Unions; 1989 | Succeeded by Jimmy Blair |
