= 1970 Chisholm by-election =

A by-election was held for the Australian House of Representatives seat of Chisholm on 19 September 1970. This was triggered by the death of Liberal Party MP Wilfrid Kent Hughes.

The by-election was won by Liberal candidate Tony Staley.

== Results ==
Chisholm by-election, 1970
Party	Candidate	Votes	%	±%
Liberal	Tony Staley	24,767	54.1	+1.2
Labor	Frank Costigan	15,335	33.5	−0.6
Defence of Government Schools	Ray Nilsen	4,138	9.0	+9.0
Australia	Andrew Morrow	1,501	3.3	−0.6
Total formal votes		45,741	98.4	
Informal votes		756	1.6	
Turnout		46,497	82.0	
Two-party-preferred result
Liberal	Tony Staley		59.0	−3.6
Labor	Frank Costigan		41.0	+3.6
Liberal hold		Swing	−3.6	
