= 1970 Scottish local elections =

Local elections were held in Scotland in May 1970, as part of that years wider British local elections.

The municipal elections, held on 5 May, saw Labour making large gains from the Conservatives, SNP, and Liberals. In Glasgow, the Labour surge denied the Progressive-Conservative alliance of their recently won control. Across Scotland the election saw Labour gaining at the expense of the SNP, with Labour managing to win back voters who had crossed over to the SNP in previous years.

County elections were held the following week, on 13 May, and also saw Labour making further gains at the expense of the SNP.

== Municipal Elections Aggregate Results ==
Scottish Municipal Elections, 1970
Party	Seats	Gains	Losses	Net gain/loss	Seats %	Votes %	Votes	+/−
Labour		70	15	▲55				
Conservative		5	13	▼8				
SNP		3	25	▼22				
Liberal			4	▼4				
Progressives		3	11	▼8				
Communist		0	1	▼1				
Other parties		15	27	▼12				

=== County Breakdown ===
Council	Labour	Conservative	SNP	Liberal	Independent	Other	Turnout	Total Seats Contested	Control	Details
Aberdeenshire									Independent	Details
Angus									Independent	Details
Ayrshire									Labour	Details
Banffshire									Independent	Details
Berwickshire									Independent	Details
Bute									Independent	Details
Caithness									Independent	Details
Dumfriesshire									Independent	Details
Fife									No overall control	Details
Lanarkshire									Labour	Details
Midlothian									No overall control	Details
Renfrewshire									Independent	Details
Roxburghshire									Independent	Details
Selkirkshire									Independent	Details
Stirlingshire	▲5								No overall control	Details
West Lothian									Labour	Details
Total	▲25	▲14	▼19							
