= Vectis National Party =

British political party

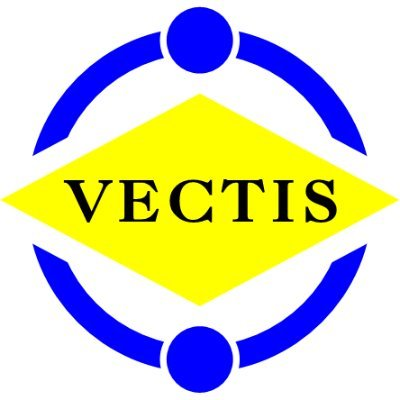
- Founded: 1967
- Ideology: Regionalism

The Vectis National Party was a minor political party operating on the Isle of Wight in the United Kingdom in the early 1970s. Formed in 1967, the party sought Crown dependency status for the Isle of Wight, on a similar model to certain other islands including the Isle of Man. They were motivated by a belief that the sale of the Isle of Wight to the English crown in 1293 was unconstitutional.

The party contested the Isle of Wight constituency in the 1970 general election when candidate R. W. J. Cawdell, a councillor for Ryde, polled 1,607 votes (2.8% of the Wight vote). The party led it to undertake symbolic direct action, such as an intra-island postal service during the 1971 postal strike. That year it narrowly lost a local government election. It also led campaigns for the establishment of an Isle of Wight specific radio service (which eventually came into being in 1990) and for a regional television service. The party's failure to convince the electorate to break from the traditional parties however led to disillusionment amongst members and by the mid 1970s the party had been wound up.

In 2006, Ray Stokes attempted to revive the VNP, emphasizing two aspects: an economically opportunistic deployment of islandness and a conservative, nostalgic impulse. The party was opposed to housing development that would lead to increased migration to the island, and to a fixed link to the island of Great Britain. The revived party did not contest any election.

== See also ==
- Politics of the Isle of Wight
