= World Government Party =

Defunct political party in the United Kingdom

- Founder: Gilbert Young
- Founded: 1958
- Dissolved: 1998
- Ideology: World government Abolition of nuclear weapons Improving elderly welfare
- Political position: Federalist

The World Government Party was a minor federalist political party in the United Kingdom with the twin aims of advocating a world government based on the British Parliament, and better welfare for the elderly. The party's proposals also included the abolition of nuclear weapons and turning Buckingham Palace into a home for old-age pensioners.

The party was founded in 1958 by Gilbert Young, who had recently resigned from the Liberal Party. Its first foray into electoral politics came when Young stood in Bath in the 1964 general election, where he received only 318 votes. In the 1970 general election, the party presented two candidates, in Bath and Dundee East, winning 1,018 votes between them. Young ran in Bath again in the February 1974 and finally the 1983 general elections, winning only 118 and 67 votes respectively.

The party, moribund for many years, became defunct upon Young's death in 1998.
