= Irish National Teachers' Organisation =

Trade union in Ireland

Irish National Teachers' Organisation (INTO)
- Cumann Múinteoirí Éireann
- Founded: 1868
- Headquarters: Dublin, Republic of Ireland
- Location(s): Republic of Ireland Northern Ireland
- Members: 53,000
- Key people: John Boyle (General Secretary),
- Affiliations: Irish Congress of Trade Unions
- Website: www.into.ie

The Irish National Teachers' Organisation (INTO) (Irish: Cumann Múinteoirí Éireann), founded in 1868, is the oldest and largest teachers' trade union in Ireland. It represents teachers at primary level in the Republic of Ireland, and at primary and post-primary level in Northern Ireland. The head office is at Parnell Square, Dublin, and there is a Northern Irish office in Belfast. The current INTO President (2025–26) is Anne Horan; John Boyle is the General Secretary and Mark McTaggart is the Northern Secretary.

== Members ==
The union represents 53,000 members (46,000 in Republic of Ireland and 7,000 in Northern Ireland) as of September 2025.

== General secretaries ==
1868: John O'Harte
1871: John Morrin
1877: J. W. Henly
1878: A. K. O'Farrell
1884: James Thompson
1891: M. O'Kelly
1894: J. Coffey
1898: Terence Clarke
1910: Michael Doyle
1913: Eamonn Mansfield
1916: Thomas J. O'Connell
1949: D. J. Kelleher
1967: Seán Brosnahan
1978: Gerry Quigley
1990: Joe O'Toole
2001: John Carr
2009: Sheila Nunan
2019: John Boyle

== Presidents ==
1868: Vere Foster
1873: John Boal
1875: John Traynor
1877: J Ferguson
1882: W Cullen
1883: J Nealon
1889: P Ward
1892: D.A. Simmons
1897: T Clarke
1899: J Hegarty
1904: J Nealon
1905: J.J. Hazlet
1906: D.C. Maher
1907: P Gamble
1908: D Elliot
1909: J McGowan
1910: E Mansfield
1911: G O'Callaghan
1912: Catherine M Mahon
1914: G O'Callaghan
1916: G Ramsey
1917: J Cunningham
1918: R Judge
1919: T.J. Nunan
1920: D.C. Maher
1921: J Harbison
1922: C Breathnach
1923: D.A. Meehan
1924: J McNeelis
1925: C.P. Murphy
1926: Thomas Frisby
1927: H O'Donnell
1928: P.J. Quinn
1929: E Caraher
1930: W.P. Ward
1931: R Neilly
1932: M Kearney
1933: C Breathnach
1934: J Hurley
1935: L Sweeney
1936: D.F. Courell
1937: J.F. O'Grady
1938: T.J. Nunan
1940: H.A. Macauley
1941: J.P. Griffith
1942: M Coleman
1943: H O'Connor
1944: Thomas Frisby
1945: K.M. Clarke
1946: D.J. Kelleher
1947: S Brosnahan
1948: L Forde
1949: J Mansfield
1950: B Bergin
1951: I.H. McEnaney
1952: P Gormley
1953: H.J. McManus
1954: M Griffin
1955: H.F. Mcune-Reid
1956: Margaret Skinnider
1957: L O'Reilly
1958: G Hurley
1959: W.M. Keane
1960: S McGlinchey
1961: P.J. Looney
1962: P O'Riordan
1963: D O'Scanaill
1964: P Carney
1965: E Liston
1966: R.S. Holland
1967: J Allman
1968: A.J. Faulkner
1969: T Martin
1970: T Warde
1971: A Brennan
1972: S O'Connor
1973: S O'Brien
1974: S Carew
1975: S Eustace
1976: B Gillespie
1977: B Scannell
1978: F Poole
1979: G Keane
1980: M McSweeney
1981: F Cunningham
1982: T Waldron
1983: M O'Connell
1984: J. J. Connelly
1985: R Carabine
1986: S Puirseil
1987: T Honan
1988: M Drew
1989: T Gilmore
1990: J White
1991: J Collins
1992: B Gilmore
1993: E Bruton
1994: M McGarry
1995: S Shiels
1996: L Mccloskey
1997: Tony Bates
1998: Brian Hynes
1999: Des Rainey
2000: Donal Ó Loingsigh
2001: Joan Ward
2002: Gerry Malone
2003: Sean Rowley
2004: Austin Corcoran
2005: Sheila Nunan
2006: Denis Bohane
2007: Angela Dunne
2008: Declan Kelleher
2009: Máire Ní Chuinneagáin
2010: Jim Higgins
2011: Noreen Flynn
2012: Anne Fay
2013: Brendan O'Sullivan
2014: Seán McMahon
2015: Emma Dineen
2016: Rosena Jordan
2017: John Boyle
2018: Joe Killeen
2019: Feargal Brougham
2020: Mary Magner
2021: Joe McKeown
2022: John Driscoll
2023: Dorothy McGinley
2024: Carmel Browne
2025: Anne Horan

== Club na Múinteoirí ==
Door of Club na Múinteoirí

Next door to the union's head office on Parnell Square is Club na Múinteoirí (the Teachers' Club) which is operated by the INTO as a space for cultural and social events, including halls, meeting rooms, a bar, and a theatre in the basement.
