= Anthony Herbert =

Anthony Herbert may refer to:

- Anthony Reed Herbert, British far right politician
- Anthony Herbert (footballer) (born 1998), Trinidadian footballer
- Anthony Herbert (rugby) (born 1966), Australian rugby (union and league) footballer
- Anthony Herbert (lieutenant colonel) (1930–2014), American soldier of the Korean and Vietnam Wars

== See also ==
- Tony Herbert, Irish Fianna Fáil senator and sportsperson
