= Victor Yates =

Victor Yates MP
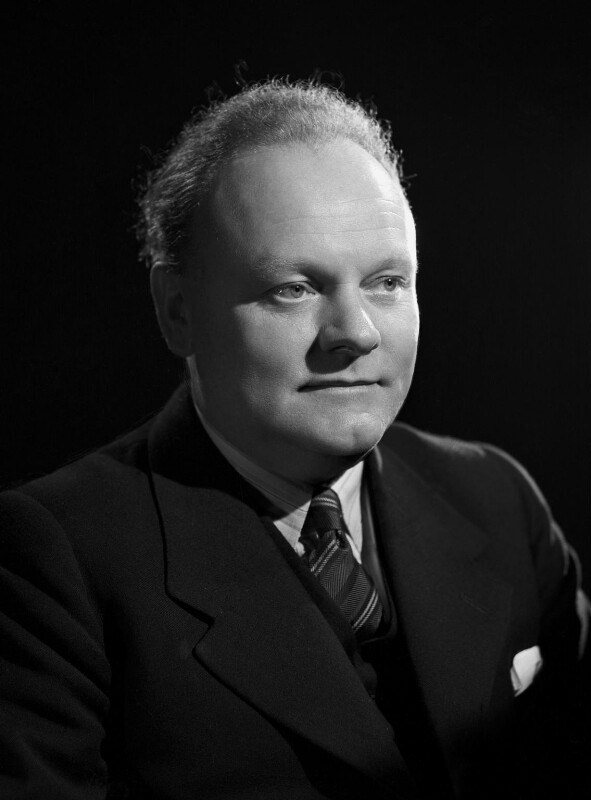

Member of Parliament for Birmingham Ladywood
- In office 5 July 1945 – 19 January 1969
- Preceded by: Geoffrey Lloyd
- Succeeded by: Wallace Lawler

Personal details
- Born: Victor Francis Yates; 19 April 1900
- Died: 19 January 1969 (aged 68)
- Party: Labour
- Known for: Pacifism

Victor Francis Yates (19 April 1900 – 19 January 1969) was a British pacifist Labour Party politician.

He was the Member of Parliament (MP) for Birmingham, Ladywood from the July 1945 general election, when he beat the Unionist incumbent, until his death in January 1969 at the age of 68. He had had a heart attack in the House of Commons in the preceding October. In the subsequent by-election the seat was gained by the Liberal candidate Wallace Lawler.

At Yates's cremation, his pallbearers were Roy Hattersley, Denis Howell, Roy Jenkins and Brian Walden.

The National Portrait Gallery holds a number of photographic portraits of him, including several by Walter Stoneman.

The Victor Yates Care Home in Ladywood is named in his honour.

Parliament of the United Kingdom
Preceded by Geoffrey Lloyd	Member of Parliament for Birmingham, Ladywood; 1945 – 1969	Succeeded by Wallace Lawler
