= Birmingham All Saints =

Parliamentary constituency in the United Kingdom, 1955–1974

- Former borough constituency for the House of Commons

1955–1974
- Seats: One
- Created from: Birmingham Ladywood and Birmingham Handsworth
- Replaced by: Birmingham Ladywood

Birmingham All Saints was a parliamentary constituency in the city of Birmingham, which returned one Member of Parliament (MP) to the House of Commons of the Parliament of the United Kingdom. Elections were held using the first-past-the-post voting system.

The constituency was created in 1955 and abolished in 1974.

== Boundaries ==
The County Borough of Birmingham wards of All Saints', Rotton Park, and Soho.

Before this seat's creation in 1955 the area (part of the city of Birmingham in the geographic county of Warwickshire) was divided between Birmingham Ladywood (All Saints and Rotton Park wards) and Birmingham Handsworth (Soho ward).

In 1966, 13.8% of the constituency was born in the New Commonwealth.

The seat was located in the west of the central part of the city, within its boundaries in 1955. To the west was Smethwick, to the north Birmingham Handsworth, to the east Birmingham Ladywood and to the south Birmingham Edgbaston.

In the 1974 redistribution, this constituency disappeared. The three wards which had comprised the seat were added to Ladywood ward to form the redrawn Birmingham Ladywood constituency; this seat's last MP, Labour's Brian Walden, contested and won the new Ladywood seat.

== Members of Parliament ==
Election	Member	Party
1955	Denis Howell	Labour
1959	John Hollingworth	Conservative
1964	Brian Walden	Labour
Feb 1974	constituency abolished	

== Elections ==
=== Elections in the 1950s ===
General election 1955: Birmingham All Saints
Party	Candidate	Votes	%	±%
Labour	Denis Howell	18,867	51.8	
Conservative	Francis J Williams	17,560	48.2	
Majority		1,307	3.6	
Turnout		51,562	70.6	
Labour win (new seat)				

General election 1959: Birmingham All Saints
Party	Candidate	Votes	%	±%
Conservative	John Hollingworth	17,235	50.0	+1.8
Labour	Denis Howell	17,215	50.0	−1.8
Majority		20	0.0	N/A
Registered electors		48,611		
Turnout		34,450	70.9	+0.3
Conservative gain from Labour		Swing	+1.8	

=== Elections in the 1960s ===
General election 1964: Birmingham All Saints
Party	Candidate	Votes	%	±%
Labour	Brian Walden	14,975	50.8	+0.8
Conservative	John Hollingworth	14,505	49.2	−0.8
Majority		470	1.6	N/A
Registered electors		44,594		
Turnout		29,480	66.1	−4.8
Labour gain from Conservative		Swing	+0.8	

General election 1966: Birmingham All Saints
Party	Candidate	Votes	%	±%
Labour	Brian Walden	16,350	58.5	+7.7
Conservative	John Hollingworth	11,595	41.5	−7.7
Majority		4,755	17.0	+15.4
Registered electors		42,896		
Turnout		27,945	65.1	−1.0
Labour hold		Swing	+7.7	

=== Elections in the 1970s ===
General election 1970: Birmingham All Saints
Party	Candidate	Votes	%	±%
Labour	Brian Walden	12,041	54.5	−4.0
Conservative	John Hollingworth	7,762	35.2	−6.3
Liberal	Dennis G Minnis	2,271	10.3	New
Majority		4,279	19.3	+2.3
Registered electors		36,290		
Turnout		22,074	60.8	−4.3
Labour hold		Swing	+1.1	

== See also ==
- List of former United Kingdom Parliament constituencies
