= British Democratic Party (1979) =

British far-right political party

- Abbreviation: BDP
- Leader: Anthony Reed Herbert
- Founder: Anthony Reed Herbert
- Founded: 1979
- Dissolved: 1982
- Preceded by: National Front
- Succeeded by: British National Party
- Headquarters: Leicester
- Ideology: British nationalism Neo-fascism; White supremacism Ultranationalism

The British Democratic Party (BDP) was a short-lived far-right political party in the United Kingdom. A breakaway group from the National Front, the BDP was severely damaged after it became involved in a gun-running sting and was absorbed by the British National Party.

== Formation and naming controversy ==
The BDP emerged following the 1979 general election in which the National Front (NF) had put up the greatest number of candidates in its history. Despite this, results fell way below the party's expectations. The recriminations that followed this financially costly defeat saw Andrew Brons replace John Tyndall as chairman whilst a number of groups broke away from the NF, notably the New National Front and the Constitutional Movement.

Within the NF, the Leicester branch had become one of the most active in the country and, since 1972, this group had been led by Anthony Reed Herbert, a local solicitor whose talent for organisation had made Leicester a model branch. Reed Herbert took the opportunity provided by the 1979 collapse of the NF to launch his own group, initially selecting the name British Peoples Party. However, the name was quickly changed in order to avoid association with the earlier British People's Party, a splinter group from the National Socialist League, organised either side of the Second World War. The name was thus changed to British Democratic Party even though a British Democratic Party, a minor right-wing anti-communist group, had also previously existed in the 1930s.

The BDP shared with the Constitutional Movement a desire to move away from open neo-Nazism in general and Tyndall and Martin Webster in particular, with Reed Herbert reasoning that a stream of press exposures of the more extreme views of both men had hit the NF's election chances hard. Effectively therefore the BDP sought to present a more "respectable" public image in contrast to that of the NF.

== Development ==
The BDP quickly gained a following within Leicester, capturing 11% of the vote in the first local elections it contested, a highly respectable score for a new and virtually unknown party. However the British Movement's Ray Hill also became involved and, after giving a copy of the party's membership list to Searchlight magazine, soon began secretly working for the anti-fascist publication full-time. Although never formally a member of the BDP Hill, on instructions from Searchlight, took a leading role in helping Reed Herbert to organise the new party. Hill also took over production of the party's newspaper British News. Hill's association with both the BDP and BM was not unusual as BDP members Dave Gagin, Chris Newman, Jack Munton and Chris Harrison all held simultaneous membership of the BM.

The association of Hill with the BDP meant that many of its activities were exposed in the press. Thus a celebration for Adolf Hitler's birthday held in 1980 in an illegal bar in the basement of the party's headquarters was reported in the Daily Mirror. Hill also fomented a plan to take over the British Movement, suggesting to Reed Herbert that the two groups could unite once it was successful, although this idea too was driven by a Searchlight plan to bring about divisions within the BM. Hill further informed the magazine on BDP plans to obtain weapons and to set up an illegal television transmitter, although information about both schemes was initially vague.

== World in Action incident ==
The BDP became embroiled in a 1981 scheme developed by the World in Action documentary series in which an American claiming to be a neo-Nazi gunrunner (but who was actually working for the programme) was put in touch with the BDP. Before long, Hill became involved in order to facilitate the sting. 'Bob Matthews', as the American claimed to be called, told Reed Herbert that he needed a gun in order to raid a US Army armoury, and Reed Herbert agreed to supply a single weapon for £200. BDP member John Grand Scrutton was chosen to ferry the weapon, a luger pistol, to a secret location arranged in advance with 'Matthews' before phoning the American to let him know more details. The resulting phone call, in which Scrutton suggested that the BDP could get hold of six more guns and told 'Matthews' to send payments to Reed Herbert's address, was recorded by World in Action and broadcast on the show.

Reed Herbert learned of the ruse from a journalist immediately prior to the broadcast of the episode as did Scrutton, whose finger prints were on the luger which by that point was in police custody. Reed Herbert sent Scrutton, under Hill's care, to a hideout in the Republic of Ireland but before long Scrutton returned to Britain and had to be brought back to Ireland by Hill. Reed Herbert eventually told Scrutton to go to South Africa and Scrutton, along with Hill, was put on a plane that stopped over at Paris-Orly Airport. However Hill had informed Searchlight about the plan and they in turn had tipped off the French authorities who arrested Scrutton and Hill before sending them back to Ireland. Under Hill's prompting, Scrutton contacted the show's producer Geoffrey Seed and, after three days of interviews, they convinced him to return to Leicester and give himself up to police. Scrutton eventually returned and made a full statement, but despite this statement, no charges were ever brought against Scrutton or any member of the BDP in regards to the weapons offences.

== Disappearance ==
Despite the incident Hill, who had moved on to a new plan to work with and undermine John Tyndall, remained close to the BDP and sought to continue working to damage the party. At this time the party also enjoyed the support of influential publisher Anthony Hancock, although he too was close to the BM and was less sure about Tyndall. Nonetheless, the gun-running incident forced the BDP to cease almost all operations, and it came as little surprise when it was brought to a conclusion in 1982 by re-joining Tyndall and Hill as founder members of the British National Party.
