= Martin Chuzzlewit (1994 TV series) =

- Paul Scofield
- Genre: Costume drama
- Based on: Martin Chuzzlewit by Charles Dickens
- Screenplay by: David Lodge
- Directed by: Pedr James
- Starring: Paul Scofield; Ben Walden; John Mills; Tom Wilkinson; Pete Postlethwaite; Philip Franks; Joan Sims; Nicholas Smith; Sam Kelly; Elizabeth Spriggs; Julia Sawalha
- Composer: Geoffrey Burgon
- Country of origin: United Kingdom
- Original language: English
- No. of series: 1
- No. of episodes: 6

Production
- Executive producers: Michael Wearing; Rebecca Eaton (WGBH Boston)
- Producer: Chris Parr
- Cinematography: John Kenway
- Running time: 385 minutes
- Production companies: Pebble Mill Productions; WGBH Boston productions for BBC

Original release
- Network: BBC2
- Release: 7 November – 12 December 1994

Martin Chuzzlewit is a 1994 TV serial produced by the BBC, based on the 1844 novel by Charles Dickens, adapted by David Lodge and directed by Pedr James. The music was composed by Geoffrey Burgon.

Episode 1 was originally aired in an 85-minute time slot, while the remaining 5 episodes were 60 minutes in length. It was originally broadcast on BBC2 from 7 November to 12 December 1994, and each episode was repeated on BBC1 a few days later. In the U.S., the series aired as 5 episodes on PBS's Masterpiece Theatre in 1995.

== Plot summary ==
Elderly, wealthy Martin Chuzzlewit is hounded by his money-grubbing relations, a fact that depresses and embitters him. He adopts an orphan young woman, Mary Graham, whom he wants as a companion in his old age; she will be paid an annual allowance but will not benefit from his death. Martin disowns his grandson, also called Martin, after he falls in love with Mary. Young Martin decides to pursue a career as an architect, studying with hypocritical, dishonest architect Seth Pecksniff, who lives with his two daughters Charity and Mercy and good, kind-hearted apprentice Tom Pinch, whom he is exploiting as a servant. Martin makes friends with Tom but after he discovers Pecksniff's true character, he leaves for America, in the company of Mark Tapley (ostler of the local inn) to seek his fortune.

Pecksniff, who is a cousin of the Chuzzlewits, insinuates himself into Old Martin's company, taking him in as a guest, hoping for a generous legacy on the event of Martin's death. He also makes sexual advances towards Mary; she, who has also formed a special friendship with Tom, tells him of this and he, shocked, leaves the Pecksniff household for London, setting up home with his sister Ruth. Jonas Chuzzlewit, son of old Martin's estranged brother Anthony, marries Mercy Pecksniff – despite being twice her age and having previously shown more interest in Charity – and mistreats her. He also finds himself drawn into a fraudulent insurance scheme masterminded by Tigg Montague and concocts a murderous plot to extricate himself from it. Mr Chuffey, Anthony's senile clerk, goes into shock in the event of Anthony's sudden death and sleazy private nurse Sarah Gamp is hired to care for him.

== Main cast ==
- Paul Scofield as Old Martin Chuzzlewit / Anthony Chuzzlewit
- Pete Postlethwaite as Tigg Montague/Montague Tigg
- Tom Wilkinson as Seth Pecksniff
- Keith Allen as Jonas Chuzzlewit
- Philip Franks as Tom Pinch
- Elizabeth Spriggs as Sarah Gamp
- John Mills as Mr. Chuffey
- Julia Sawalha as Mercy Pecksniff
- Emma Chambers as Charity Pecksniff
- Steve Nicolson as Mark Tapley
- Pauline Turner as Mary Graham
- Ben Walden as Young Martin Chuzzlewit
- Lynda Bellingham as Mrs. Lupin
- Maggie Steed as Mrs. Todgers
- David Bradley as David Crimple
- Joan Sims as Betsey Prig
- Sam Kelly as Mr. Mould
- Peter Wingfield as John Westlock
- Graham Stark as Mr. Nadget

== Critical reception ==
"The British cast is exemplary," observed The New York Times; while Variety opined, "Would-be adaptors, screenwriters and producers would profit by a study of Lodge's work on "Chuzzlewit". The adaptation's characters and plotline stick to Dickens' intentions, despite omissions, and the five-part dramatization does even more: It catches the original's blithe spirit."
