= John Hollingworth (politician) =

British politician (1930–2018)

John Harold Hollingworth (11 July 1930 – 4 March 2018) was a British Conservative politician.

Hollingworth was born in Birmingham in July 1930. Educated at King Edward's School, Birmingham. In the Conservative election landslide of 1959, Hollingworth was elected Member of Parliament (MP) for Birmingham All Saints, a constituency that normally elected Labour MPs. In 1964, Hollingworth lost his seat to Labour candidate Brian Walden. He died in March 2018 at the age of 87.

Parliament of the United Kingdom
Preceded by Denis Howell	Member of Parliament for Birmingham All Saints; 1959 – 1964	Succeeded by Brian Walden
