= 1969 Birmingham Ladywood by-election =

UK parliamentary by-election

The 1969 Birmingham Ladywood by-election, in Birmingham, on 26 June 1969 was held after Labour Member of Parliament (MP) Victor Yates died on 19 January the same year. Although the seat had been Labour-held since 1945 it was captured by the Liberals in a defeat for Harold Wilson's government.

== Background ==
Wallace Lawler was a prominent local Liberal councillor who campaigned for a hard line immigration policy in the aftermath of Enoch Powell’s Rivers of Blood speech. Just eleven days after Powell’s speech, Lawler said in a Liberal Party TV national party political broadcast, “We have got to halt immigration into Birmingham, the Black Country and other heavily concentrated areas”.

In the broadcast, according to The Birmingham Daily Post:

Lawler went on to give what he called some of the "ugly facts" about Birmingham. Over half the houses in multiple occupation were tenanted by immigrants. VD was terrifyingly high among immigrants compared to the rest of the population. Nearly one-third of the Birmingham Children's Department spending was on immigrant problems. Seven out of 13 cases of typhoid last year were immigrants.

This controversy continued into 1969, with denial by the Liberals that Lawler was racist in January, and disagreements about Lawler's attitudes at the Young Liberals' Conference in April.

== Campaign ==
In Doris Fisher, Dr. Louis Glass and Wallace Lawler the three major parties all picked candidates who were members of the local council. Lawler, however, had a strong reputation for campaigning in the area, having previously used issues raised by the television drama Cathy Come Home (1966) to highlight poverty in the area, organised a petition to protest against increases in electricity prices and arranged a protest demonstration of mainly Birmingham pensioners to travel to London to hand in letters and petitions at 10 Downing Street. As a consequence, the popular local activist ensured the first Liberal Party MP for a Birmingham constituency in 80 years.

Colin Jordan ran as a candidate for the far right British Movement and, with Ray Hill as his election agent, their campaign, in which their literature attacked Jews and immigrants and proclaimed loyalty to Nazism, led to some violent scuffles with opponents. Although Jordan finished a distant fourth the result was frequently cited by those who advocated Nazi orthodoxy on the far right as the British Movement won 282 votes (3% share), despite openly wearing swastika insignia and featuring Adolf Hitler's image on their literature.

A candidate for the anti-militarist Fellowship Party also contested the by-election.

== Result ==
Birmingham Ladywood, 1969
Party	Candidate	Votes	%	±%
Liberal	Wallace Lawler	5,104	54.35	+30.64
Labour	Doris Fisher	2,391	25.46	−33.46
Conservative	Louis Glass	1,580	16.82	−0.54
British Movement	Colin Jordan	282	3.00	New
Fellowship	James Haigh	34	0.36	New
Majority		2,713	28.89	N/A
Turnout		9,391		
Liberal gain from Labour		Swing		
