= Ben Walden =

English actor

Ben Walden (born 10 August 1969) is an English actor. He is known for The Camomile Lawn (1992), The Man Who Cried (1993), Martin Chuzzlewit (1994), High Heels and Low Lifes (2001) and Band of Brothers (2001). He is the son of former Labour MP and political interviewer Brian Walden.

== Career ==
In 1997, Walden acted in Thomas Middleton's play A Chaste Maid in Cheapside at Shakespeare's Globe theatre in London. Malcolm McKay was director. In 1998, Walden acted in William Shakespeare's play, Richard III at the Pleasance Theatre in London. The following year, Walden appeared in Shakespeare's Antony and Cleopatra at the Bankside Globe Theatre in London.
