= Clare Short =

British politician (born 1946)

The Right Honourable Clare Short
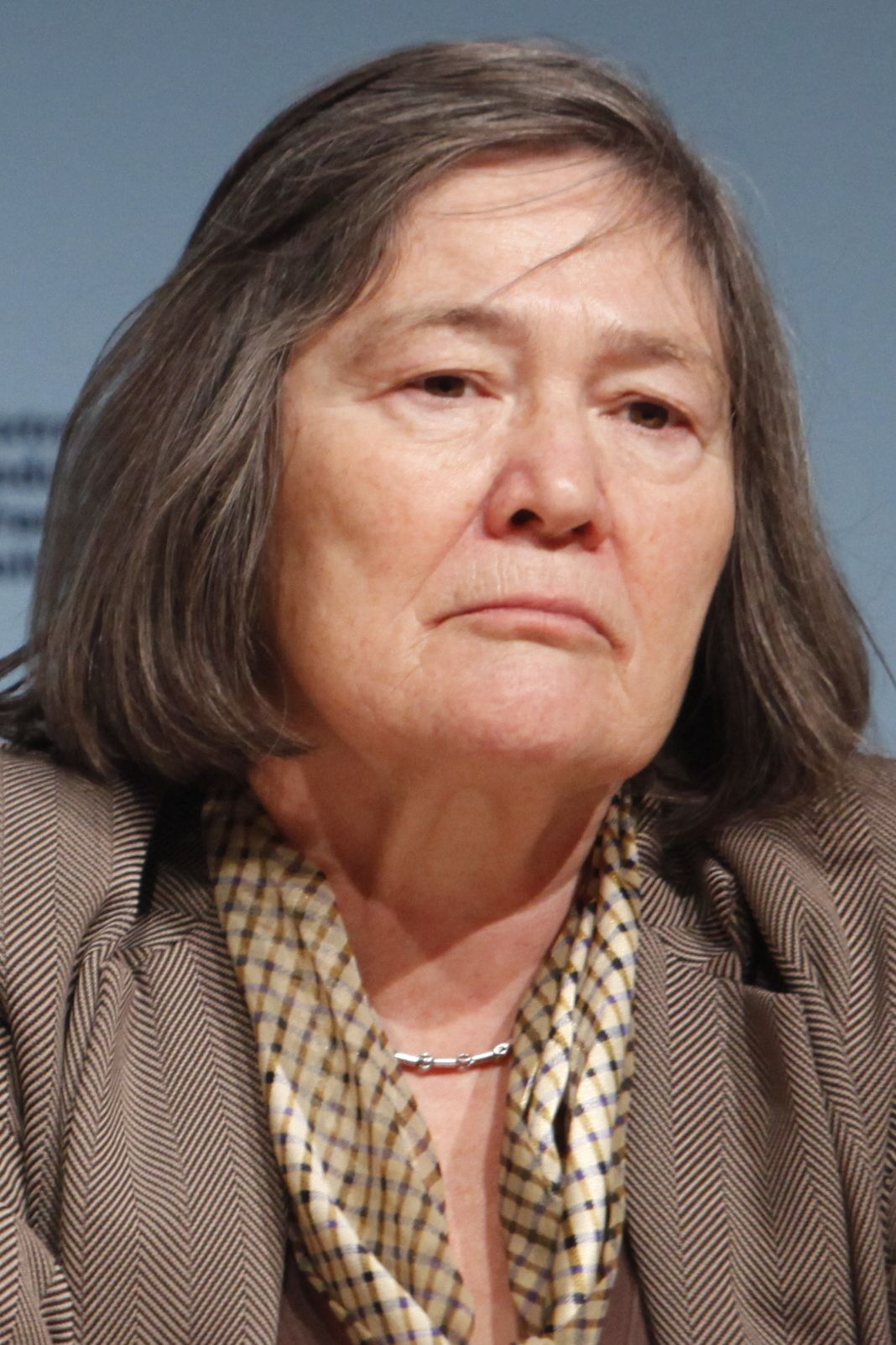
- Short in 2011

Secretary of State for International Development
- In office 2 May 1997 – 12 May 2003
- Prime Minister: Tony Blair
- Preceded by: The Baroness Chalker of Wallasey (Note: As Minister for Overseas Development)
- Succeeded by: The Baroness Amos

Member of Parliament for Birmingham Ladywood
- In office 9 June 1983 – 12 April 2010
- Preceded by: John Sever
- Succeeded by: Shabana Mahmood

Shadow portfolios
- 1996–1997: Shadow Minister for Overseas Development
- 1995–1996: Shadow Secretary of State for Transport
- 1993–1995: Shadow Minister for Women

Personal details
- Born: 15 February 1946 (age 80) Birmingham, England
- Party: Independent (since 2006)
- Other political affiliations: Labour (until 2006)
- Spouse: Alex Lyon (m. 1981; died 1993)
- Education: University of Leeds
- Website: Official website

Clare Short (born 15 February 1946) is a British politician who served as Secretary of State for International Development from 1997 to 2003.

Short began her career as a civil servant. A member of the Labour Party until 2006, she was Member of Parliament for Birmingham Ladywood from 1983 to 2010.

Following the 1997 United Kingdom general election, Short was made the first cabinet-level Secretary of State for International Development. She resigned from the cabinet over the Iraq War. She also resigned the party whip in 2006 and served the remainder of her term as an independent politician, leaving parliament at the 2010 general election.

== Early and personal life ==
Short was born in Birmingham in 1946 to Irish Catholic parents from County Armagh, Northern Ireland. She attended St Paul's School for Girls in Birmingham.

She was later supportive of peaceful Sinn Féin initiatives, but never a supporter of IRA violence, some of the worst of which was inflicted in a 1974 bombing of her home city of Birmingham.

Completing her degree in political science at the University of Leeds, she became a civil servant working for the Home Office. Working as Private Secretary to the Conservative minister Mark Carlisle gave her the idea that she "could do better" than many of the MPs she dealt with, and at the 1983 general election she was elected as MP for the Birmingham Ladywood constituency, the area in which she had grown up.

Short is a paternal cousin of Canadian actor Martin Short.

== Political career ==
=== Member of Parliament ===
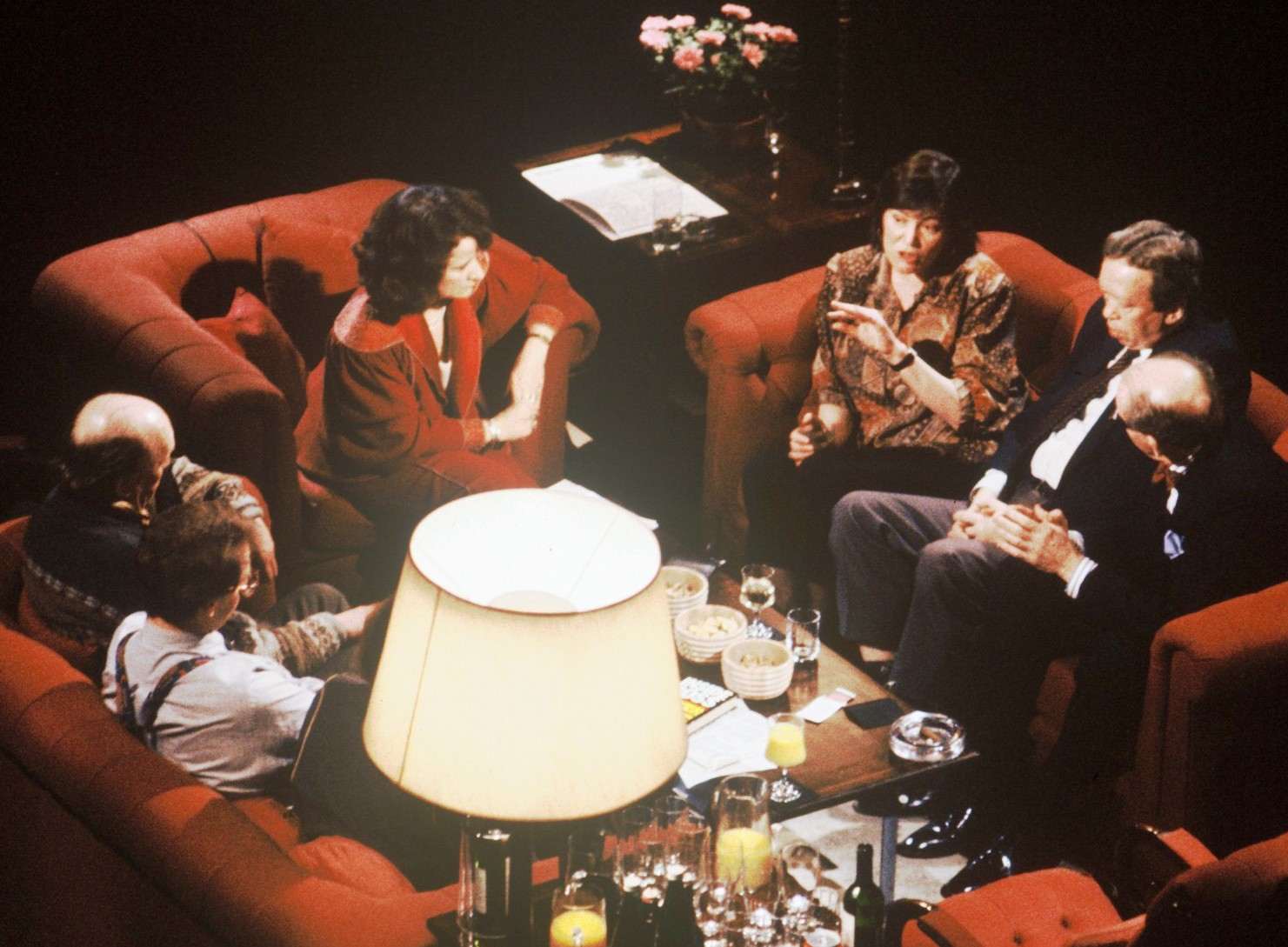
Appearing on television discussion After Dark "Counting the Cost of a Free Press" in 1991 (3rd from R)

At the start of her career, she was firmly on the left wing of the Labour Party. She gained some notoriety shortly after her election in 1983 when she implied the government's Employment minister Alan Clark was drunk at the despatch box. Clark's colleagues on the government benches in turn accused Short of using unparliamentary language and the Deputy Speaker, Ernest Armstrong, asked her to withdraw her accusation. Clark later admitted in his diaries that Short had been correct in her assessment.

In 1986, Short introduced a Private Members Bill in the House of Commons which proposed banning Page 3 photographs of topless models featured in The Sun and other British tabloid newspapers. In order to ensure her motion would be tabled, she slept in Parliament overnight. For this Private Members Bill, she was nicknamed by The Sun "killjoy Clare" and "Crazy Clare." One paper bought and published alleged photographs of Short in her nightwear from her ex-husband. She stated they were pictures of somebody else's body with her face superimposed. The Sun also sent a busload of Page 3 models to her home where she lived with her elderly mother. Clare gave a definitive account of her attitude towards tabloid nudity and the negative role that pornography plays more generally in society in her introduction to the book Dear Clare (1991), which presents a selection of the many letters of support she received from women in response to her campaign.

She supported John Prescott in the Labour Party deputy leadership election in 1988 (against Eric Heffer and the incumbent Roy Hattersley), leaving the Socialist Campaign Group, along with Margaret Beckett, as a result of Tony Benn's decision to challenge Neil Kinnock for the party leadership. She supported Margaret Beckett for the Labour leadership in 1994 against Tony Blair and John Prescott. She also called for the withdrawal of British troops from Northern Ireland.

In 1989 she raised the issue of abuse of police procedure and fabrication of evidence at the West Midlands Serious Crime Squad, relaying concerns of Birmingham solicitors that many miscarriages of justice had taken place.

She rose through the ranks of the Labour Front Bench, despite twice resigning from it – over the Prevention of Terrorism Act in 1988, and over the Gulf War in 1990. She became Shadow Minister for Women (1993–1995), Shadow Transport Secretary (1995–1996) and Opposition Spokesperson for Overseas Development (1996–1997). Clare was also a member of Labour's National Executive Committee (NEC) from 1988 to 1997 and Chair of the NEC's Women's Committee (1993–1996). At the 1995 Labour Party conference, Short denounced Liz Davies as "unsuitable" after Davies had been selected as a Parliamentary candidate by a constituency Labour Party in Leeds North-East. This was seen as an attempt to win the favour of the right wing of the party, especially then-leader Tony Blair. In 1996, Short was moved to the Overseas Development portfolio, a move which she saw as a demotion. Short also called for the legalisation of cannabis.

=== Secretary of State for International Development ===
Following the 1997 general election, the Overseas Development Administration was given full departmental status as the Department for International Development, with Short as the first cabinet-level Secretary of State for International Development. She retained this post throughout the first term of the Labour government, and beyond the 2001 general election into the second.

On her appointment to the DfID, journalists asked Short whether she would be "good" (in other words, not cause embarrassment to the government). She replied "I'm going to try to be good but I can't help it, I have to be me." A few months later, the island of Montserrat (one of the United Kingdom's few remaining overseas territories) was devastated by a volcanic eruption which rendered half the island uninhabitable; when the 4,500 islanders asked for more help from the DfID, Short was reported to have remarked "they will be asking for golden elephants next". This remark caused offended the Montserratians and others; Labour MP Bernie Grant said that "She sounds like a mouthpiece for an old nineteenth century colonial and Conservative government."

==== Land reform in Zimbabwe ====
On 6 November 1997, Short sent a letter to Kumbirai Kangai, Minister of Agriculture of Zimbabwe, in which she stated that "we do not accept that Britain has a special responsibility to meet the costs of land purchase in Zimbabwe." She went on to write "We are a new government from diverse backgrounds, without links to former colonial interests. My own origins are Irish and, as you know, we were colonised, not colonisers." In the same letter she offered qualified support for land reform: "We do recognise the very real issues you face over land reform... we would be prepared to support a programme of land reform that was part of a poverty eradication strategy, but not on any other basis." This letter caused a rift with the Zimbabwean government, which asserted that the Lancaster House Agreement of 1979 had contained a pledge from the United Kingdom government to assist in land reform.

==== Position on the arms trade ====
In December 1997, Short signed the UK into the Ottawa Convention, banning the production, handling and use of anti-personnel mines.

In 2001, she wrote that the "ready availability of small arms has a direct and negative impact upon levels of crime and conflict in developing countries. We (the DFID) are supporting various peace building and disarmament initiatives." The following year, she stated that Britain was "committed to combating small arms availability and misuse."

==== Kosovo bombing ====
Short approved of the 1999 NATO bombing of the headquarters of Serbian state television, in which sixteen media workers were killed and sixteen others wounded, because the station was, as she put it, "a source of propaganda".

==== Resignation ====
On 9 March 2003, Short repeatedly called Tony Blair "reckless" in a BBC radio interview and threatened to resign from the Cabinet in the event of the UK Government going to war with Iraq without a clear mandate from the United Nations. This looked set to be a reprise of her previous resignation as party spokesperson during the Gulf War of 1991 as a protest against the Labour Party's stance, although in 1999 she had publicly supported the NATO attack on Serbia. On 18 March she announced that she would remain in the Cabinet and support the government's resolution in the House of Commons.

Short remained in the Cabinet for two months following her decision to back the 2003 Iraq War. She resigned on 12 May. In her resignation statement in the House of Commons the following day she stated: "In both the run-up to the war and now, I think the UK is making grave errors in providing cover for the US mistakes rather than helping an old friend... American power alone cannot make America safe... But undermining international law and the authority of the UN creates the risk of instability, bitterness and growing terrorism that will threaten the future for all of us."

Her later, Conservative, successor in the post, Andrew Mitchell, described her as "a brilliant development secretary".

=== Backbenches ===
==== Bugging of the UN ====
On 26 February 2004, Short alleged on the BBC Today radio programme that British spies regularly intercept UN communications, including those of Kofi Annan, then Secretary-General. The claim was made the day after the unexplained dropping of whistleblowing charges against former GCHQ translator Katharine Gun. Reacting to Short's statement, Tony Blair said "I really do regard what Clare Short has said this morning as totally irresponsible, and entirely consistent [with Short's character]." Blair also claimed that Short had put British security, particularly the security of its spies, at risk.

A few days later, on 29 February, Short appeared on ITV's Jonathan Dimbleby programme, on which she revealed that she had been written to by Britain's most senior civil servant, Cabinet Secretary Andrew Turnbull. Turnbull's confidential letter (which Short showed to Dimbleby, and which was quoted on the programme) formally admonished her for discussing intelligence matters in the media, and threatened "further action" if she did not desist from giving interviews on the issue. Turnbull wrote that she had made claims "which damage the interests of the United Kingdom", and that he was "extremely disappointed". The "further action" referred to in the letter has been interpreted as threatening either Short's expulsion from the Privy Council or legal action under the Official Secrets Act. Either course of action have been without recent precedent; at the time, no Privy Counsellor had been expelled since Sir Edgar Speyer was accused of collaborating with the Germans during the First World War. On 1 March 2004, a Downing Street spokesman refused to rule out such a step. In the same interview with Jonathan Dimbleby, Short backtracked on her claim about British agents bugging Annan. She admitted that the transcripts she saw of Annan's private conversations might have related to Africa and not to Iraq. Asked whether she could confirm that the transcripts related to Iraq, she said: "I can't, but there might well have been ... I cannot remember a specific transcript in relation, it doesn't mean it wasn't there." Short also said that her original claim, on the Today programme, that Britain had eavesdropped on Annan, may have been inaccurate. Asked whether the material could have passed to the British by the Americans, she said: "It could. But it normally indicates that. But I can't remember that."

==== Book ====
Clare Short's book, An Honourable Deception?: New Labour, Iraq, and the Misuse of Power, was released by Free Press in November 2004. It was an account of her career in New Labour, most notably her relationship with Prime Minister Tony Blair, the relationship between Blair and Gordon Brown and the build-up to the 2003 invasion of Iraq. The book won Channel 4's Political Book of the Year Award for 2004.

==== Statements on Israel ====
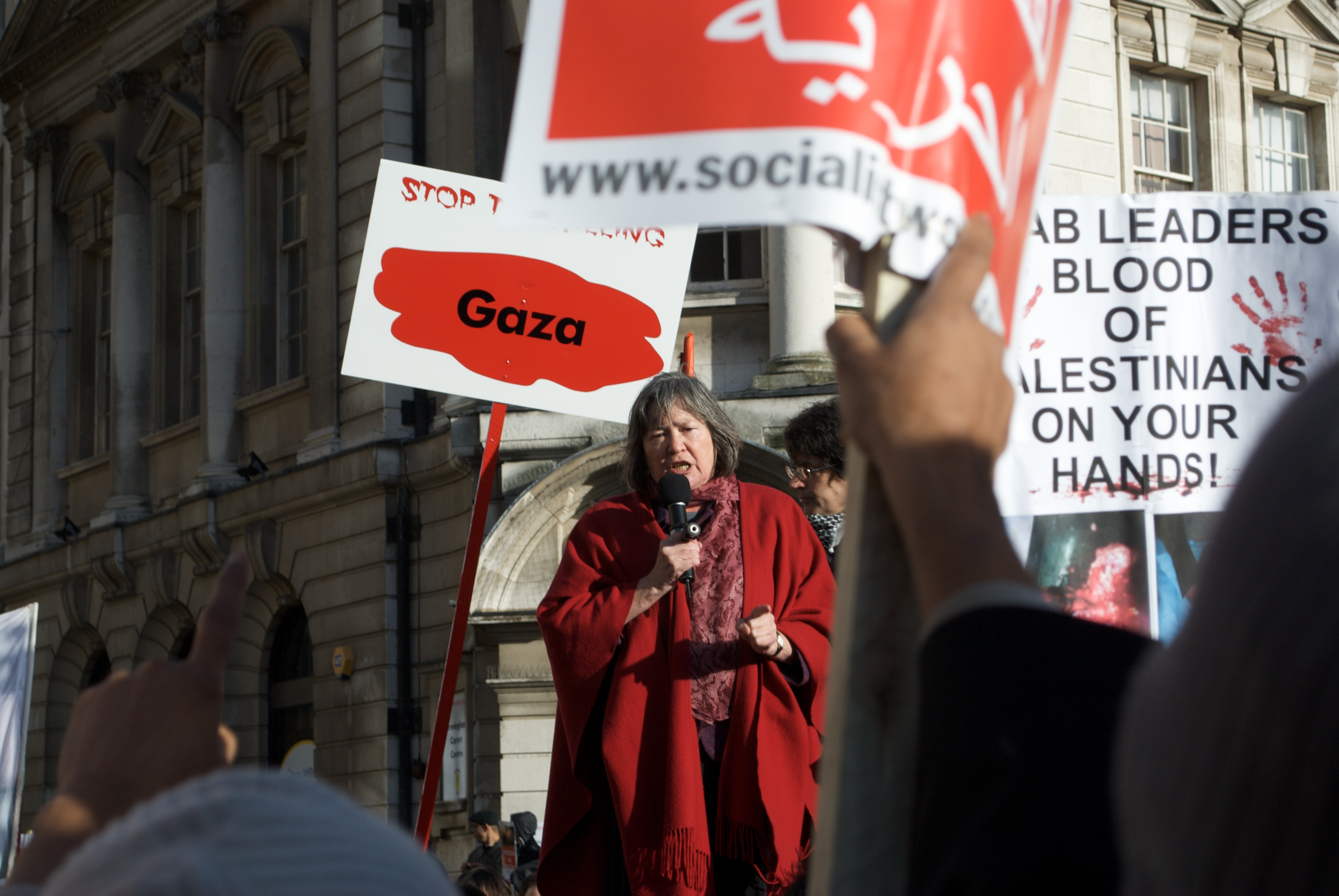
Short speaking at a rally in Birmingham in January 2009, urging the crowd "not forget the crimes being committed against the people of Gaza" following the 2008–2009 Israel–Gaza conflict

Short has condemned Israel as being guilty of "bloody, brutal and systematic annexation of land, destruction of homes and the deliberate creation of an apartheid system." She has also stated that "the EU and Britain are colluding in this operation and the building of a new apartheid regime" because they give Israel privileged trade access.

Short has expressed support for a boycott of Israel, stating at the 2007 United Nations International Conference of Civil Society in Support of Israeli-Palestinian Peace that "The boycott worked for South Africa, it is time to do it again".

==== Relationship with al-Manar Television ====
According to The Guardian, Short accepted £1,580 worth of flights, hotel accommodation, food and travel expenses from al-Manar Television in Lebanon in 2008. Al-Manar is described by the US government as "the media arm of the Hezbollah terrorist network", and was classed as a specially designated terrorist entity by the US in 2006.

Short said her trip had been registered with Commons authorities and that the visit allowed her to see how reconstruction in southern Lebanon was proceeding after the country's conflict with Israel in 2006.

==== Announced retirement ====
On 12 September 2006, Short announced that she would not be standing at the next general election. In a brief statement, Short said she was "ashamed" of Tony Blair's government and backed proportional representation, which she hoped would be achieved through a hung parliament. The Labour Party Chief Whip referred the matter to the Labour Party National Executive Committee to consider disciplinary action. On Friday 20 October, Short resigned the Labour whip and announced that she would sit as an Independent Labour MP. Short received a written reprimand from Labour's Chief Whip shortly before the news of her resignation of the party whip was announced.

After Gordon Brown succeeded Tony Blair as Prime Minister, Short said that the change offered "a new beginning", and hinted that she might re-join the parliamentary Labour Party if Brown changed the policies that had caused her to leave.

==== Chilcot Inquiry ====
On 2 February 2010, Short appeared before the Chilcot Inquiry into Iraq. During this she repeatedly criticised Tony Blair, Attorney General Peter Goldsmith and others in the UK Government for allegedly deceiving her and other MPs in an attempt to obtain consent for the invasion of Iraq.

== After Parliament ==
=== Chairwoman of the EITI ===
On 1 March 2011, she was elected as Chairwoman of the EITI (the Extractive Industries Transparency Initiative) at the EITI Global Conference in Paris.

=== Policy work with Cities Alliance ===
Since 2006, Short has been a member of the Cities Alliance Policy Advisory Board and subsequently chaired the Policy Advisory Forum, described as a "platform for public discussion, debate and knowledge sharing" on urban poverty and the role of cities.

=== Birmingham Mayoral candidate consideration ===
In January 2011, Short expressed an interest in becoming a candidate for the Mayor of Birmingham, pending the outcome of a referendum on the creation of a directly-elected mayoralty in the city. Ultimately, the proposal was defeated at a public vote in May 2012.

=== Ebor Lectures ===
On 21 May 2008, Short gave a lecture as part of the Ebor Lectures 2008 Series entitled "Apocalypse Now – Global Equity and Sustainable Living, the Preconditions for Human Survival". She spoke of the need to end the "throw-away society". She considered the changing conception of the world since the 1960s and emphasised the need for us to consider the consequences of today's environmental concerns for the generations of the future.

=== Keir Starmer ===
Short was heavily critical of Keir Starmer as prime minister, saying his government was "not a Labour government". In January 2026, she told the New Statesman that "there's no place for people like me in Starmer's Labour".

== Cultural collaborations ==
Since 2018, Short has collaborated with public artist Martin Firrell. Firrell has quoted Short on billboards displayed across the UK. For the artist's Power and Gender series (2019), Short contributed the text, 'Distorted Power and Great Inequality Are Evil'.

The Union City series (2019) included Short's observation that 'Socialism Is A Moral Idea'. Short explained: "People want to make socialism mean the Soviet Union and so on, but it also meant Clement Attlee becoming British Prime Minister in 1945, and the development of the welfare state across Europe after the war: actions that produced the best and most civilised time we have ever experienced. And what has capitalism meant? The Chilean dictator Pinochet, slavery, famine! My point is that socialism is first and foremost a moral idea not an economic system."

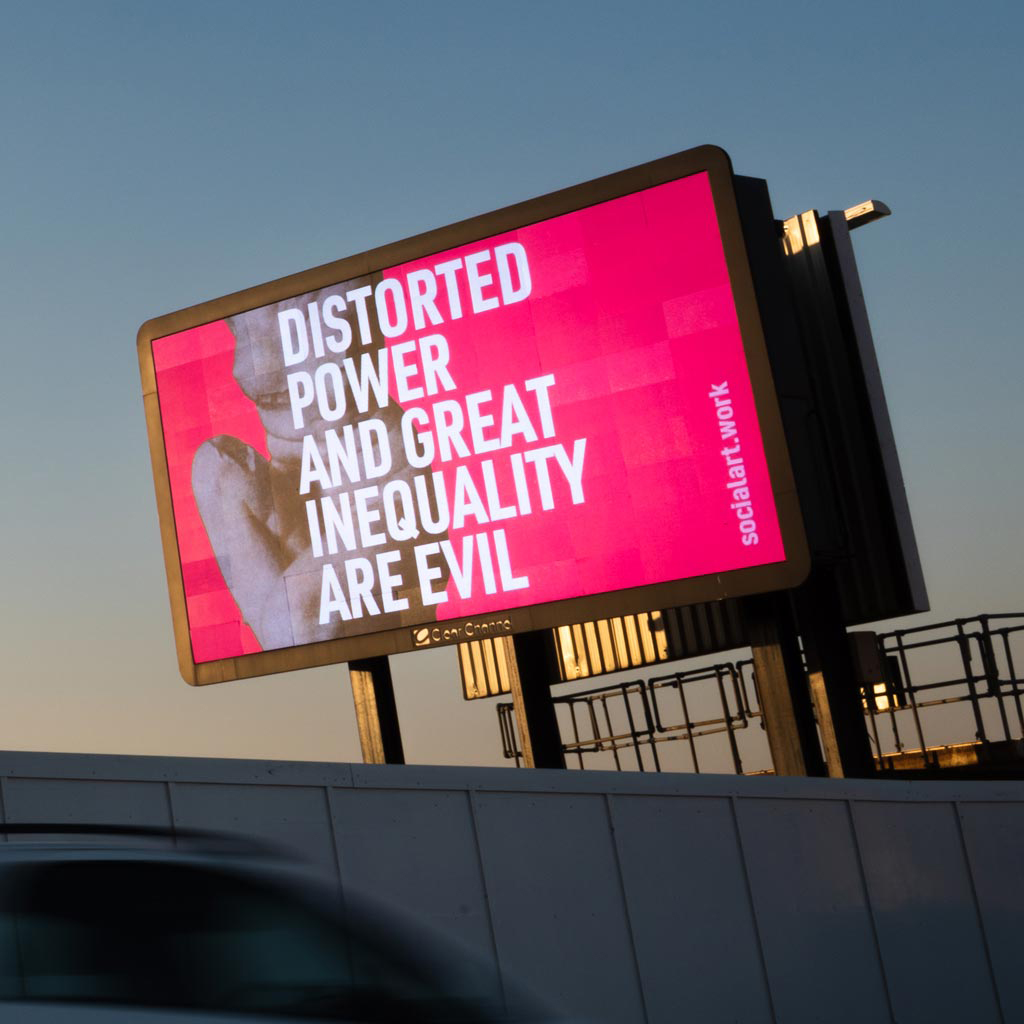
Clare Short quoted by artist Martin Firrell in Power and Gender, Digital Billboards, UK 2019

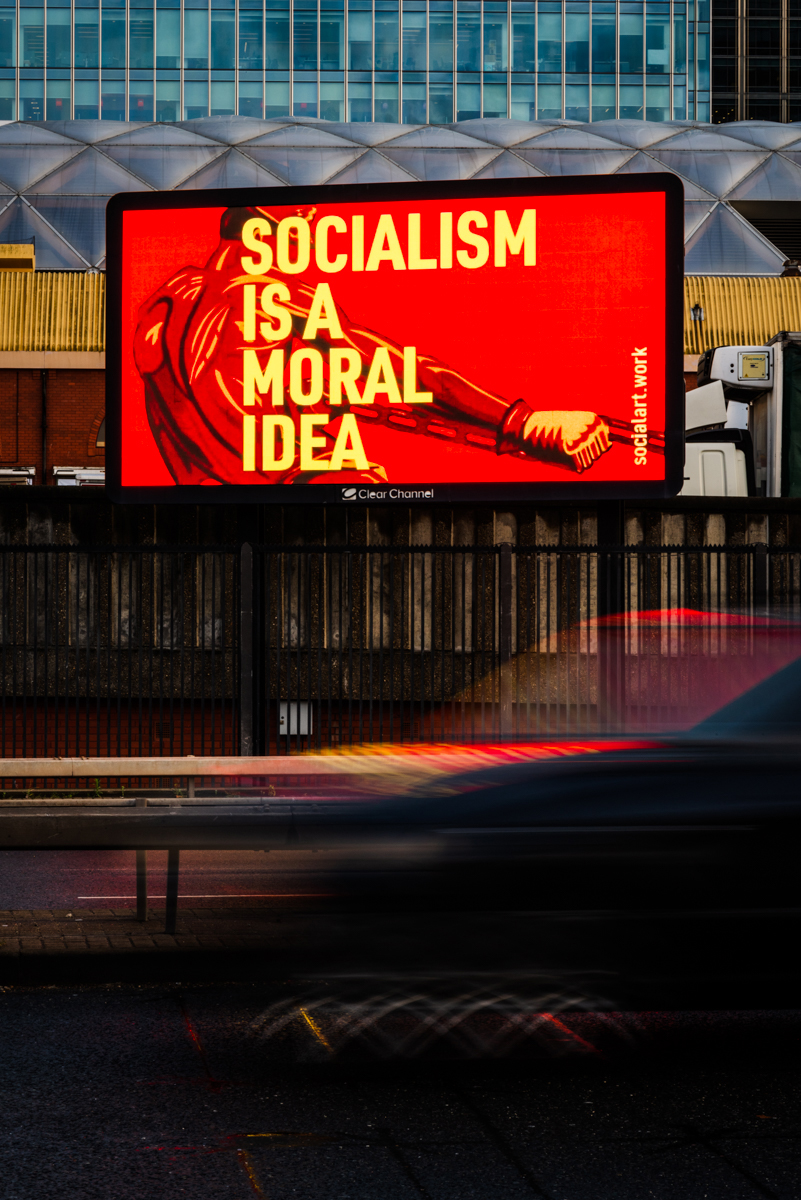
A Moral Idea: Clare Short quoted by artist Martin Firrell, Digital Billboards, UK 2019

== Personal life ==
Short was briefly married to a fellow Keele University student at 18 after they had a baby when she was 17. The couple's son was given up for adoption, and did not make contact with his mother until 1996. She then discovered that her son, Toby, was a Conservative supporter who worked as a solicitor in the City of London, and had three children.

Clare Short married Alex Lyon, then Labour MP for York.

In 1993, Short was called away from the Labour party conference to hear that her husband was very ill and likely to die. In her book An Honourable Deception, she describes how "after losing his parliamentary seat, he moved from being a senior Labour MP to running my constituency office where he gave me enormous support as well as bringing great experience to the task. Later he decided to return to the Bar, but after a time got himself into various difficulties and I began to suspect that either he was suffering a deep depression or mental deterioration. The next few years were very difficult as he engaged in strange, inexplicable behaviour. He gradually fell out with family and friends and stayed home with our St Bernard called Fred and would deal with no one but Fred and me."

== Awards ==
In June 2009, Short received an honorary degree of Doctor of Laws from the University of Ulster in recognition of her services to international development. In 2013, she was recognized as one of the BBC's "100 women".

== Works ==
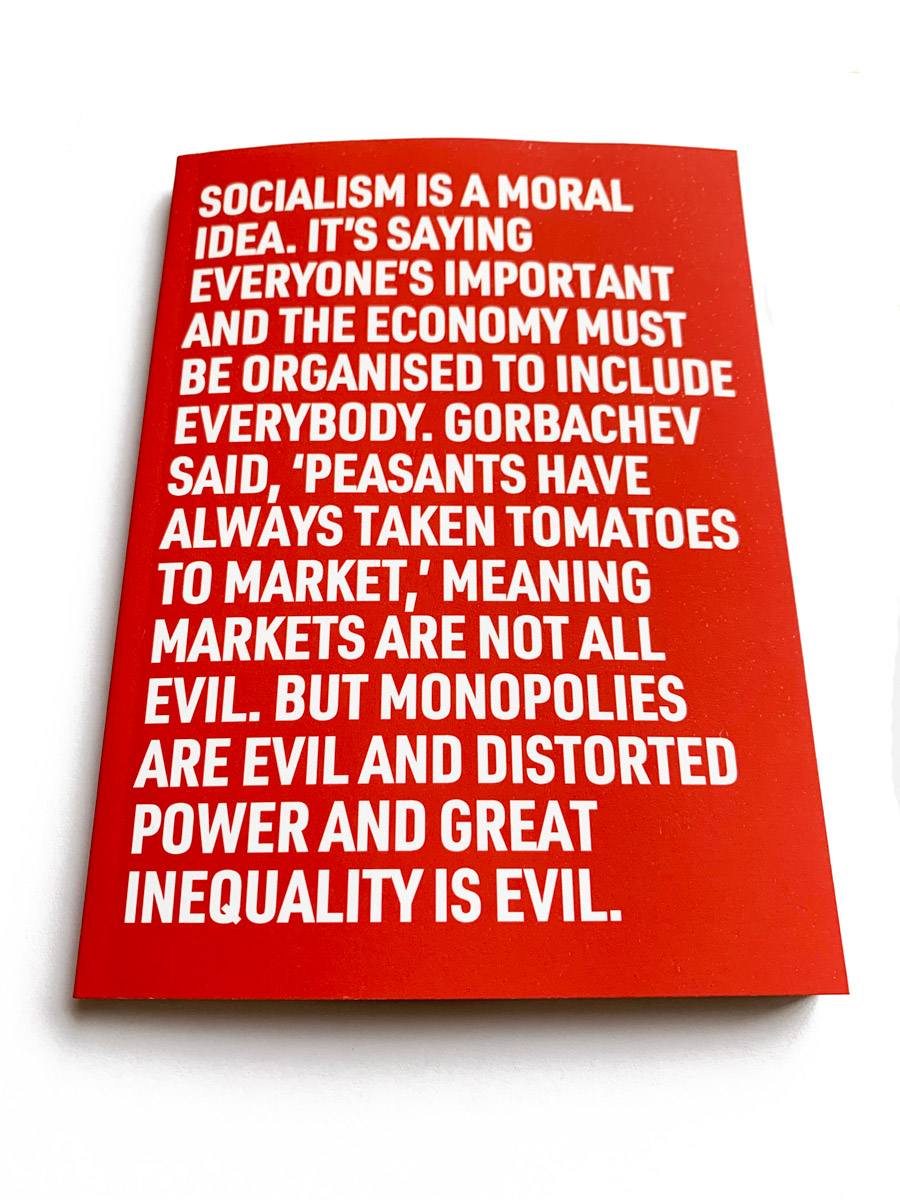
Political pamphlet by public artist Martin Firrell quoting Clare Short

- in conversation Short, Clare with artist Firrell, Martin (2019) Socialism Is A Moral Idea. Martin Firrell Company, ISBN 978-1912622078
- Short, Clare (2004). An Honourable Deception? New Labour, Iraq, and the Misuse of Power. Free Press. ISBN 0-7432-6392-8.
- Short, Clare (speech, 2001) Making Globalisation Work for the Poor: A Role for the United Nations Department for International Development, ISBN 1-86192-335-X
- Short, Clare (1999). Debt Relief for Poverty Reduction. Department for International Development. ISBN 1-86192-100-4.
- edited by Short, Clare, K. Tunks, D. Hutchinson (1991) Dear Clare...This Is What Women Feel About Page 3 Radius, ISBN 0-09-174915-8

== Notes ==
Parliament of the United Kingdom
Preceded by John Sever	Member of Parliament for Birmingham Ladywood; 1983–2010	Succeeded by Shabana Mahmood
Political offices
Preceded by The Baroness Chalker of Wallasey as Minister of State for Overseas Development	Secretary of State for International Development; 1997–2003	Succeeded by The Baroness Amos
