= 1977 Birmingham Ladywood by-election =

UK parliamentary by-election

The 1977 Birmingham Ladywood by-election of 18 August 1977 was held after Labour Member of Parliament (MP) Brian Walden resigned in order to concentrate on his career as a journalist and broadcaster. A safe Labour seat, it was retained by the party.

At the count, the Socialist Unity candidate, Raghib Ahsan, punched the National Front candidate, Anthony Reed Herbert.

== Result ==
Birmingham Ladywood by-election, 1977
Party	Candidate	Votes	%	±%
Labour	John Sever	8,227	53.13	−11.34
Conservative	Quentin Davies	4,402	28.43	+6.33
National Front	Anthony Reed Herbert	888	5.73	New
Liberal	Kenneth Hardeman	765	4.94	−8.49
Socialist Unity	Raghib Ahsan	534	3.49	New
Independent	James Hunte	336	2.17	New
Socialist Workers	Kim Gordon	152	0.98	New
Independent Conservative	George Matthews	71	0.46	New
Reform Party	Peter Courtney	63	0.41	New
Air Road Public Safety	Bill Boaks	46	0.30	New
Majority		3,825	24.70	−17.7
Turnout		15,484		
Labour hold		Swing	-8.84	
