= Ebor Lectures =

British lecture series

The Ebor Lectures are an annual series of lectures in the United Kingdom that aim to draw together theology and public life, considering the role of faith in "public issues such as politics, economics, contemporary culture, and spirituality." The first series began in 2006–2007 with the theme of "Liberating Text: Revelation, Identity, and Public Life," and transcripts for this series have been published as a book entitled Liberating Texts." The 2007–2008 series had the theme of globalisation and identity. Following the Covid pandemic lockdowns of 2020 and 2021, the Ebor lectures were relaunched in 2023.

== Organisers ==
The Ebor Lectures are jointly organised by the following groups and are held either at York Minster or at York St John University in York, northern England.

- York Minster
- York St John University
- The C. and J. B. Morell Trust
- The Methodist Church (Yorkshire North and East District)
- York Area Society of Friends (Quakers)

== History ==
=== 2006–2007 Series ===
Liberating Text? Revelation, Identity and Public Life

- Uncovering the Purposes of God
  - The Most. Revd. and Rt. Hon. Dr John Sentamu - Archbishop of York
- God and our Public Life: A Scriptural Wisdom
  - Prof. David Ford - Regius Professor of Divinity, University of Cambridge
- Text and Context: Making Sense of Islam in the Modern World
  - Dr Ataullah Siddiqui - Director, Markfield Institute of Higher Education
- Sacred Text and the Transcendence of Tradition: The Bible in a Pluralist Society
  - The Revd. Professor Francis Young - Emeritus Professor, University of Birmingham
- The Bible and Modern Israel
  - Rabbi Professor Dan Cohn-Sherbok - Professor of Judaism, University of Wales, Lampeter
- Religious Traditions in the Context of a Liberal Democracy
  - The Rt. Hon. The Baroness Williams of Crosby

=== 2007–2008 Series ===
Globalisation and Identity

- Christian Identity amidst Global Contradictions: A Christian Humanist Perspective
  - Professor John de Gruchy - University of Cape Town
- William Blake 250 years on - Prophet for our Time?
  - Professor Christopher Rowland - University of Oxford
- Patterns of Religion in Modern Europe: A Global Perspective
  - Professor Grace Davie - University of Exeter
- Poverty and Prophets: Faith based Agencies and Social Justice
  - Dr Daleep Mukarji - Director, Christian Aid
- Globalisation and Muslim Identity in Europe
  - Professor Tariq Ramadan - President, European Muslim Network/University of Oxford
- Apocalypse Now – Global Equity and Sustainable Living, the Preconditions for Human Survival
  - The Rt. Hon. Clare Short MP

=== 2008–2009 Series ===
The Challenge of Climate Change
Eco-crisis, Sustainable Living and the Future of the Planet

- Hope, Hype and Honesty Reporting Global Change: A Still Point on a Turning Planet
  - Mr Martin Redfern - Senior Producer, BBC Radio Science Unit
- Silence in Heaven: Reading Climate Change Through the Book of Revelation
  - Professor Tim Gorringe - Professor of Theological Ethics, University of Exeter
- Creation, Ecological Crisis and the Global Poor
  - Dr Elaine Storkey - President, Tearfund
- Renewing the Face of the Earth: Human Responsibility and the Environment
  - The Most Rev & Rt Hon Dr Rowan Williams - Archbishop of Canterbury
- Disturbing the Present
  - Mr John Sauven - Executive Director, Greenpeace UK,
- ‘Consider the lilies of the field’: How Luke’s Gospel Could Save the Planet
  - Professor Mary Grey - Professor Emerita, University of Wales, Lampeter
- The Science of Climate Change
  - Professor Nicholas Owens - Director, British Antarctic Survey

2017 Series

Ruth Hunt, Chief Executive of Stonewall, "Here I am Lord". The Place for LGBT people in the modern Christian Movement, 22 February 2017; York Minster, 7.00pm

Dr Timothy Winter, Shaykh Lecturer in Islamic Studies at the University of Cambridge, Religion, Radicalism and Contemporary Politics, 29 March 2017; Temple Hall, York St John University, 7.00pm

Tim Shipman, Political Editor of The Sunday Times, The Journey through Brexit, 26 April; York Minster, 7.00pm

Dr Casey Strine, Lecturer in Eastern History and Literature at University of Sheffield, What refugees can teach others about the Bible, 24 May 2017; Temple Hall, York St John University, 7.00pm

Professor Eamon Duffy, FBA, Emeritus Professor of the History of Christianity, Writing the Reformation: Fiction and Faction, 5 July 2017; York Minster, 7.00pm

Ruth Gledhill, Editor of Christian Today; former Religious Affairs Correspondent for The Times, 'This Virtual Pilgrimage: How our temporal journey is leading us in a new reformation', 11 October 2017; Temple Hall, York St John University, 7.00pm
