= Wilfrid Whiteley =

British Labour Party politician (1882-1970)

Wilfrid Whiteley (3 February 1882 – 4 April 1970) was a British Labour Party politician.

== Early life ==
Wilfrid Whiteley was born in 1882 in Salendine Nook, a district in Huddersfield, Yorkshire. Whiteley attended Padock Board School in Huddersfield until the age of 12. After leaving school he worked at Willans wool warehouse for 18 1/2 years. Whiteley briefly worked part-time at the Advertiser Press when he was aged 18. Whiteley had a strong interest in politics and was involved with the administrative side of politics from 1911 until 1925 as secretary of the Lockwood Independent Labour Party.

== Politics ==
From 1914 to 1918 Whiteley, as an anti-militarist and staunch socialist, took a leading part in opposition in Huddersfield to the Great War, and was a conscientious objector. He had the desire to succeed in politics, and was supported by the Independent Labour Party as he stood for election in Colne Valley in the 1918 'Khaki' election, representing the Labour Party. Whiteley was unsuccessful in his attempt, but was commended for his honesty whilst campaigning, as he highlighted to the electorate that he had been a conscientious objector. This was a crucial factor in his failure at the ballot box, as soldiers returning from the battlefields were highly revered, whereas conscientious objectors were often accused of cowardice.

After defeat in the 1918 election Whiteley worked as Publications Manager for the National Labour Press in Manchester. Whiteley was invited to stand for election again in Colne Valley in the 1921 election, but he eventually declined the offer, as he was unemployed and beset by financial worries. In 1925 Whiteley moved to Birmingham, where he was Labour Party agent and secretary for Oswald Mosley in Smethwick, Staffordshire. In his role as Mosley's secretary Whiteley was responsible for helping to organise Mosley's meetings and engagements in the wider area. Whiteley was in regular contact with G.T. Sutton, who was the Private Secretary of Oswald Mosley, based in London.

== Elected to Parliament ==
From 1929 to 1931 Whiteley was Labour Member of Parliament for Birmingham Ladywood, replacing the Conservative Neville Chamberlain, who stood elsewhere. After defeat in 1931 he became Labour Party constituency agent for Birmingham West (UK Parliament constituency) in 1932–1936. He was also Labour Party agent for the now defunct Elland constituency from 1936 to 1947.

All information gathered from the Wilfrid Whiteley Papers at the Borthwick Institute for Archives, University of York

Parliament of the United Kingdom
Preceded by Neville Chamberlain	Member of Parliament for Birmingham Ladywood; 1929 – 1931	Succeeded by Geoffrey Lloyd
