= Pauline Turner =

Scottish actress

- Born: Dumbarton, West Dunbartonshire, Scotland
- Occupation: Actress
- Years active: 1994–present
- Television: Martin Chuzzlewit; Peaky Blinders

Pauline Turner is a Scottish actress, known for her role as Mary Graham on the BBC drama series Martin Chuzzlewit (1994), Frances on the BBC period drama series Peaky Blinders (2017–2019) and as June Begbie in the 2017 film T2 Trainspotting.

== Filmography ==
=== Film ===
Year	Title	Role	Notes
1998	Goodnight Mister Tom	Annie Hartridge	
2003	Young Adam	Connie	
2017	T2 Trainspotting	June	
2020	Beyond Existence	Waitress	Post-production

=== Television ===
Year	Title	Role	Notes
1994	Martin Chuzzlewit	Mary Graham	
1996	Taggart	Kate Reilly	Episode: "Dead Man's Chest Part One"
1998	Wycliffe	Kim	Episode: "Time Out"
1998	Heartbeat	Mel Drinkwater	Episode: "Pat-a-Cake"
1999	Casualty	Ronnie Morgan	Episode: "Bennie and the Vets"
2003	The Key	Dorothy	
2003	Two Thousand Acres of Sky	Chemists' Sales Clerk	Episode: #3.3
2015	Cuffs	Hester	Episode: #1.2
2018	Call The Midwife	Lily	Episode: #7.6
2018	Casualty	Estelle Mullar	Episode: #33.2
2019	Vera	Bridie Mincham	Episode: "Cuckoo"
2017–2019	Peaky Blinders	Frances	Series 4–5
2019	Britannia	Stumpy Celt	Episode: #2.3

=== Theatre ===
Year	Title	Role	Notes
2001	The Mill On The Floss by George Eliot	First Maggie	Directed by Helen Edmundson, The Ambassadors, London & Kennedy Center, New York

== Awards and nominations ==
Year	Award	Category	Result	Ref(s)
2002	Helen Hayes Award	Outstanding Leading Actress in a Non-Resident Production	Nominated	
