= John Sever =

British Labour MP

MP for Birmingham Ladywood
- In office 18 August 1977 – 1983

Personal details
- Born: 1 April 1943 (age 83)
- Party: Labour

Eric John Sever (born 1 April 1943) is a former Labour Party politician in England.

Sever was elected Member of Parliament for Birmingham Ladywood at a by-election in 1977. He served until 1983, having been deselected in 1981 as prospective Labour candidate in favour of Albert Bore. Sever instead stood in Meriden, a safe seat for the Conservative Party, where he lost by 15,018 votes.

Parliament of the United Kingdom
Preceded by Brian Walden	Member of Parliament for Birmingham Ladywood; 1977 – 1983	Succeeded by Clare Short
