= Wallace Lawler =

British Liberal politician

Wallace Lawler MP
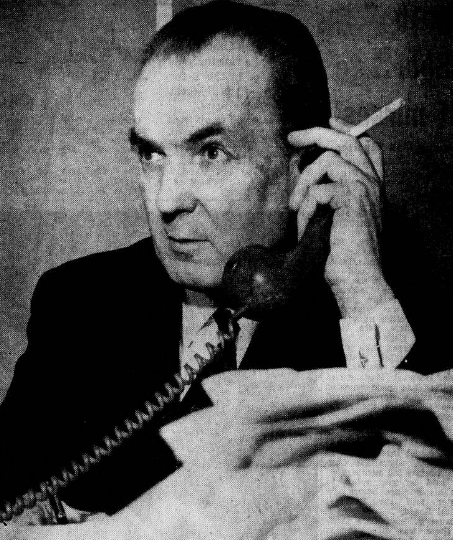
- Wallace Lawler, 1969

Member of Parliament for Birmingham Ladywood
- In office 26 June 1969 – 29 May 1970
- Preceded by: Victor Yates
- Succeeded by: Doris Fisher

Personal details
- Born: Wallace Leslie Lawler; 5 March 1912 Worcester, Worcestershire, England
- Died: 28 September 1972 (aged 60)
- Party: Liberal
- Spouse: Catherine Letitia Durcan (m. 1943)
- Children: 4
- Education: St Paul's School, Worcester
- Military career
- Allegiance: United Kingdom
- Branch: British Army
- Units: 8th Battalion, the Worcestershire Regiment
- Conflicts: Second World War

Wallace Leslie Lawler (15 March 1912 – 28 September 1972) was a British Liberal politician. He was elected a Member of Parliament (MP) by gaining the Birmingham Ladywood constituency from Labour at a by-election on 26 June 1969. However, he only served for one year; Labour's Doris Fisher regained the seat from him at the 1970 general election. Lawler was the last Liberal to serve as a Member of Parliament in Birmingham until John Hemming, of the successor Liberal Democrats, gained Birmingham Yardley in 2005.

== Early life and career ==
Wallace Lawler was born in Worcester, the son of Stephen and Elizabeth Lawler (née Taylor). He was educated at St Paul's School, Worcester, and privately at Malvern, Worcestershire. In 1943 he married Catherine Letitia Durcan. They had two sons and two daughters.

Lawler had an early interest in community projects and youth work in particular. He founded the Worcester Boys' Club for teenagers in 1928, and was involved in youth work until he went to Birmingham in 1938 to work as an aircraft engineer. During the Second World War he served in the 8th Battalion, the Worcestershire Regiment. In 1964 he founded his own plastics business and later took over another established firm called ABCD Plastics, of which he became chairman.

Following up his interest in youth work, Lawler was associated with a wide range of community organisations. In 1943, he founded the Public Opinion Action Association. In 1956, he became Secretary and later Chairman of an emergency accommodation bureau to find homes for homeless people in Birmingham set up after a conference of religious, civic, political and business people presided over by the Bishop of Birmingham, Dr J L Wilson. He also worked for the community through the Wallace Lawler Friendship Trust (1969) and Citizens' Service Ltd (1970).

== Local politics ==
At the time of the 1945 general election, Lawler was said to be a man opposed to all political parties, but during the 1950s he became active in the Liberal Party, even though its electoral record in the West Midlands was dismal.

Lawler's activities in Birmingham had a national reach. Britain's then best-selling newspaper, the Daily Mirror, reported Lawler's campaigning activities, starting with a big splash on his Homeless Bureau in 1956. There was a front-page splash with "Rents: ‘Double or Quit’" in 1960.

There was a 1966 article on fire safety in housing, and a long campaign against higher electricity charges saw a petition with 85,000 signatures handed in at No. 10 Downing Street.

There was a 1967 report about an all-night vigil by women in temporary accommodation who were separated from their husbands – this was two weeks after the showing of the TV play Cathy Come Home – and a 1968 splash about eight houses compulsorily purchased without any compensation.

In 1962, Lawler became the first Liberal to be elected to Birmingham City Council for nearly 30 years when he won the Newtown ward. He was re-elected in 1965, not only holding his seat but increasing his majority fourfold – despite Labour having worked hard to unseat him and having assigned one of the party's most experienced agents to work to secure his defeat. He retained his Newtown seat again in 1968, and from 1968 to 1972 he led the Liberal Party's small group on the Council. In 1971 he was created an Alderman, a position he held until he died the following year.

Lawler held a number of important Liberal posts in the Birmingham area, including Chairman of Birmingham Liberal Organisation, and became the first chairman of the Birmingham Liberal Federation when it was founded in 1965. The new Federation was established to end dissension between Birmingham Liberal Organisation and the West Midlands Liberal Federation and the ambitious plan was to make Birmingham the spearhead of a campaign to win industrial seats for the Liberal Party.

Lawler first stood for Parliament as Liberal candidate in Dudley in the Black Country at the 1955 general election, coming third with under 10% of the vote and losing his deposit. He fought Birmingham Perry Barr at the 1959 general election, again coming third, but this time gaining 14% of the poll – thus avoiding losing his deposit. In 1964 he was the candidate in Birmingham Handsworth. Again he came third, but achieved 17.6% of the poll.

== Ladywood ==
At the 1966 general election he switched to contest Birmingham Ladywood. In what was by that time one of the smallest constituencies in the country, with an electorate of only just over 25,000 (to be compared with electorates of around double that in the rest of the city) Lawler found he was able to make a greater impact at parliamentary level, campaigning directly with the people who lived in the area. He managed to come second to Labour in 1966, beating the Conservatives into third place. The Birmingham Post wrote that Lawler waged a "canny campaign": "in his election posters, the fact that he is a Liberal is not mentioned. It just says: 'Back Lawler, Man o’ the People, to Win.'"

Lawler gained nearly 24% of the vote to Labour's 58%. This result, plus the work in the constituency that Lawler did in the next three years, laid the foundation for his attempt on the seat at the Ladywood by-election in 1969.

== 1969 Ladywood by-election ==
Against the backdrop of massive redevelopment in Birmingham city centre, the electorate of Ladywood had shrunk, the constituency suffered from significant deprivation and its population would today be classified as socially excluded. Given his own background of community work and his experience as a city councillor, Lawler involved himself heavily in the problems of the community, championing the underprivileged and their concerns over housing, homelessness and social upheaval.

In 1967, in the controversy which followed the first screening of the television drama Cathy Come Home the previous December, Lawler was reported as saying that he dealt with a "Cathy family" every day in his political work in Birmingham. Later in 1967, he organised a mass petition with more than 80,000 signatures to the prime minister to protest against increases in electricity prices, and that October he arranged a protest demonstration of mainly Birmingham pensioners to travel to London to hand in letters and petitions at 10 Downing Street.

After the sitting Labour MP for Ladywood, Victor Yates, died in January 1969, a by-election fell due. However, the election writ was not moved for months, giving Lawler time to consolidate his position. When the election was held on 26 June, he won the seat with a majority of 2,713 votes over his Labour rival Doris Fisher, with the Conservative, Dr Louis Glass, in third place. All three candidates were members of Birmingham City Council. Ladywood was the first Liberal parliamentary success in Birmingham for 80 years.

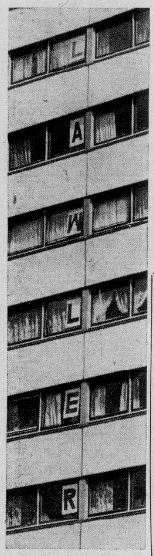
Council tenants showed their support for Lawler – Birmingham Mail, 19 June 1969

== 1970 general election ==
Patrick Brogan in The Times reported during the 1970 general election campaign that "Wallace Lawler is living proof that personality matters in politics. He is Liberal MP for Birmingham Ladywood. Single-handed, he has revived Liberalism in a city which had long forgotten there was such a thing.....He knows everybody and all their problems and everybody knows him".

During the campaign, "A huge set of placards was displayed along one floor of a block of council flats reading “Back Lawler's rents and rates – down fight”."

Lawler did not retain the seat he had gained at the by-election; Doris Fisher regained it for Labour, with a majority of 980 votes.

== Immigration and race ==
In 1958, Lawler said that immigrants had "preference" in the housing market, while local families with young children lost out.

Six months after the Sharpeville massacre in 1960, Lawler chaired a meeting in Birmingham addressed by the Information Attaché at South Africa House, London, which was reported under the headline "Apartheid aims at civilising peoples".

In 1961 Lawler spoke alongside other local political figures at a solidarity meeting in Birmingham, timed to coincide with three days of non co-operation protest by black people in South Africa.

Lawler advocated immigration controls in his 1961 election address for the city council's Sandwell Ward. He took 1,025 votes (21.9%) and Harry Jones of the Birmingham Immigration Control Association took 1,002 (21.4%). Lawler and Jones ran third and fourth behind the two winning Conservatives in this two-seat by-election, pushing Labour to the foot of the poll. Lawler was certainly keenly aware of public concerns about immigration at this time.

Immigration was a major theme of Lawler's 1964 general election campaign in Birmingham Handsworth. Lawler called for government financial compensation to householders for the depreciation in house prices in "hardship cases such as elderly people who suddenly found that immigrants were living next door". This replicated the most notorious theme of the campaign in the neighbouring constituency Smethwick in the 1964 general election On the eve of polling, the Birmingham Post carried a lengthy article on Handsworth, in which the Liberals advocated deportation for immigrant criminals "without the option of fine or imprisonment". Lawler called for "a tightening-up of the employment voucher system so that immigrants were prevented from drawing national assistance soon after arriving".

Nicholas Deakin refers to three West Midlands seats in 1964 where "candidates were prepared to use immigration for electoral advantage". The "obvious example of exploitation was Smethwick"; the others were the Conservative campaign in Birmingham Perry Barr, "and Birmingham Handsworth, where the Liberal candidate, Wallace Lawler, made considerable play with the issue in specially issued pamphlets, associating immigration with attacks on vice and crime in the constituency".

Lawler's Conservative opponent in this election was Sir Edward Boyle, a prominent liberal on immigration. During the election, John Sanders, Chairman of the Birmingham Immigration Control Association, told a press conference that "the two most unpopular politicians in Birmingham today are Patrick Gordon Walker and Sir Edward Boyle".

From 1964 onward Lawler advocated that labour permits should be "issued only to people who could pass health checks 100% in the country of origin".

Eleven days after Enoch Powell's Rivers of Blood speech in 1968, Lawler said in a Liberal party political broadcast on national television, "We have got to halt immigration into Birmingham, the Black Country and other heavily concentrated areas." The Birmingham Post reported that "Mr. Lawler went on to give what he called some of the 'ugly facts' about Birmingham. Over half the houses in multiple occupation were tenanted by immigrants. VD was terrifyingly high among immigrants compared to the rest of the population. Nearly one-third of the Birmingham Children's Department spending was on immigrant problems. Seven out of 13 cases of typhoid last year were immigrants."

== Politics at national level ==
Lawler was active for the Liberal party at national level. He was Vice-Chairman of the Liberal Party Council (1967) and Vice-President of the Liberal Party Executive in 1968. While he was in Parliament, he was Liberal Party spokesman on housing and pensions and he served as a Member of the Select committee on Race Relations and used this platform to warn Enoch Powell he would not be able to make immigration an election issue, saying the electorate had more immediate and pressing issues to worry them such as the cost of living. Despite this stance, Lawler's reputation inside the Liberal Party locally and nationally was somewhat tarnished by his views on Commonwealth immigration. He advocated a policy of dispersal of immigrants and suggested that most categories of immigrants should be prevented from settling in Birmingham. Councillor Paul Tilsley was one leading Liberal in Birmingham to express doubts about the choice of Lawler for the Ladywood by-election, given his controversial remarks about immigration in 1968.

== Community politics ==
Political commentators and historians of the Liberal Party usually agree that the development of community politics proved a major stimulus in reviving the political and electoral fortunes of the Liberal Party after 1970 and that the techniques of community politics were used to good electoral effects across Britain but especially in the city of Liverpool and other urban centres.

The Liberal Party Assembly at Eastbourne in 1970 adopted community politics as an electoral and philosophical approach, declaring that ‘Our role as political activists is to help and organise people in communities to take and use power, to use our political skills to redress grievances; and to represent people at all levels of the political structure." Stuart Mole commented that "The techniques of community politics had first been fashioned in the Newtown area of Birmingham by Wallace Lawler". This was appropriate according to one historian of the Liberal Party because of the curious echoes in community politics of tactics used by Joseph Chamberlain and Francis Schnadhorst to build up Liberal support in Birmingham almost a century earlier.

As one political scientist has commented, "In fact community organisation in Britain was not pioneered by new social movements but by the Liberal Party in Birmingham. Its leader in the 1960s, Wallace Lawler, placed a high priority on organisation in the localities."

== Death and legacy ==
Wallace Lawler died on 28 September 1972.

In an obituary in the Birmingham Post, John Falding wrote inter alia that "Ald. Lawler. who was aged 60, brought into every-day usage a medical term hypothermia, the often fatal falling-off of body temperature among old people unable to afford adequate heating, and he took action to investigate and prevent the condition."

== Publications ==
- Pensions For All, 1958
- The Truth About Cathy, 1968

== See also ==
- List of United Kingdom MPs with the shortest service

Parliament of the United Kingdom
Preceded by Victor Yates	Member of Parliament for Birmingham, Ladywood; 1969 – 1970	Succeeded by Doris Fisher
