= Doris Fisher, Baroness Fisher of Rednal =

British politician

The Right Honourable The Baroness Fisher of Rednal JP
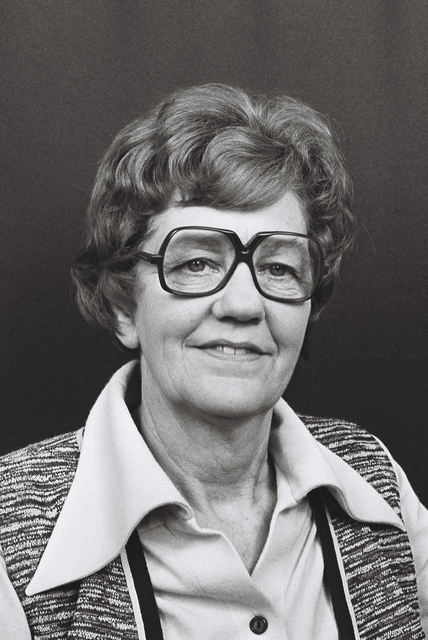

Member of the House of Lords
- Lord Temporal
- Life peerage 2 July 1974 – 18 December 2005

Member of Parliament for Birmingham Ladywood
- In office 18 June 1970 – 8 February 1974
- Preceded by: Wallace Lawler
- Succeeded by: Brian Walden

Personal details
- Born: Doris Mary Gertrude Satchwell; 13 September 1919 Birmingham, England
- Died: 18 December 2005 (aged 86) Birmingham, England
- Party: Labour
- Spouse: Joseph Fisher (m. 1939; died 1978)
- Children: 2

Doris Mary Gertrude Fisher, Baroness Fisher of Rednal JP (née Satchwell; 13 September 1919 – 18 December 2005) was a British politician.

== Early life and career ==
Born in Birmingham, she was the daughter of Frederick James Satchwell. She was educated at Tinker's Farm Girls' School, Fircroft College and Bournville Day Continuation College.

She joined the Labour Party in 1945 and was nominated director of her local Co-operative board in 1951. A year later, Fisher was elected a member of the Birmingham City Council, in which she sat until 1974. Subsequently, she served as a member of the Warrington and Runcorn Development Corporation until 1989. Fisher was National President of the Co-operative Party Guild in 1961 and was appointed a Justice of the Peace.

== Parliamentary career ==
She contested Birmingham Ladywood in 1969 at a by-election in which Wallace Lawler of the Liberals gained the seat from Labour. In the following general election, Fisher defeated him when she was returned as the constituency MP, representing the seat until the February 1974 general election when her seat was altered in boundary changes. After her departure from the House of Commons, she was created a life peer as Baroness Fisher of Rednal, of Rednal, in the City of Birmingham on 2 July 1974.

In the House of Lords, Fisher became Crown Representative of the General Medical Council in September 1974 and later chaired the Esperanto Group. She was nominated an Assistant Whip for Environment in 1983, an office she held until the following year. Fisher entered the European Parliament in 1975, sitting in Strasbourg until 1979. She was vice-president of the Institute of Trading Standards Administration (today the Trading Standards Institute).

In December 1991, at the age of 72, Lady Fisher slept rough in a nest of cardboard boxes at Birmingham's St Philip's Cathedral to draw attention to the plight of the city's homeless.

== Personal life ==
She married Joseph Fisher, a sheet-metal-worker at the Longbridge plant, in 1939 and had two daughters. Her husband died in 1978 and she survived him until 2005, when she died aged 86.

Parliament of the United Kingdom
| Preceded by Wallace Lawler | Member of Parliament for Birmingham Ladywood; 1970 – February 1974 | Succeeded by Brian Walden |
