= Brian Walden =

British politician and broadcaster

Member of Parliament for Birmingham Ladywood (Birmingham All Saints, 1964–1974)
- In office 15 October 1964 – 16 June 1977
- Preceded by: John Hollingworth
- Succeeded by: John Sever

Personal details
- Born: Alastair Brian Walden; 8 July 1932 West Bromwich, Staffordshire, England
- Died: 9 May 2019 (aged 86) Saint Peter Port, Guernsey
- Party: Labour
- Spouses: Sybil Blackstone; Jane McKerron; Hazel Downes
- Children: 4, including Ben (by McKerron)
- Education: The Queen's College, Oxford; Nuffield College, Oxford
- Occupation: Broadcaster; journalist; MP
- Awards: Richard Dimbleby Award (1986)

Alastair Brian Walden (8 July 1932 – 9 May 2019) was a British journalist and broadcaster who spent over a decade as a Labour politician and Member of Parliament (MP). He was considered one of the finest political interviewers in the history of British broadcasting. Tenacious and ruthless, he won awards for broadcasting including the BAFTA Richard Dimbleby Award for television in 1986, and in 1991 was named ITV Personality of the Year. He was known for interviews of politicians, especially Margaret Thatcher. He was said to be her favourite interviewer, although he gave her tough interviews.

== Early life ==
Born in West Bromwich, Walden was the son of a glassworker and attended West Bromwich Grammar School. He won an open scholarship to study history at The Queen's College, Oxford. In 1957 he was elected president of the Oxford Union.

After Sir Oswald Mosley was invited to speak at a debate held on 24 October 1957, Walden was asked by a fellow undergraduate why Mosley had been invited. He replied, "This society was founded many years ago to enshrine a very great principle, that of free speech. The society has had to fight against many authorities to ensure that minority points of view shall be put". Walden apparently "narrowly missed a first" in history in his finals. The following year he undertook a speaking tour of the United States with Stuart Griffiths, during which he took part in 47 debates.

Walden began a doctorate at Nuffield College, Oxford about Lord Randolph Churchill; however, he never finished it.

== Political career ==
Walden unsuccessfully contested the safe Conservative constituency of Oswestry in the 1961 by-election, coming third for Labour.

At a debate at the Oxford Union held on 11 June 1964, Walden caused uproar by calling Lord Beaverbrook, who had died two days previously, "evil and repellent" and for attacking the "evil and despicable influence" of his Express group of newspapers.

At the 1964 general election Walden was elected MP for Birmingham All Saints in an election where race dominated the Birmingham campaign. He was re-elected in the general elections of 1966 and 1970. When All Saints was abolished, Walden sought and gained the Labour nomination for Birmingham Ladywood, and was elected there in February 1974 and October 1974.

In the aftermath of Enoch Powell's November 1968 Eastbourne speech advocating the repatriation of immigrants, Walden urged Prime Minister Harold Wilson not to waver in his opposition to Powell's proposals: "If the Government did waver and harass and bully some of Her Majesty's subjects towards the boats, British politics would sink to the gutter". In January 1970, Walden introduced his unsuccessful private member's bill, the Right of Privacy Bill, which was designed to protect people's right to privacy from the press.

In October 1971, Walden told an anti-EEC meeting in Brighton that Roy Jenkins and others in the Labour movement favoured Britain joining because they despaired of their country: "They have grown sick of crisis after crisis and they do not believe that Britain, as an independent country, can solve her own problems.... But they are wrong". After Jenkins resigned from the deputy leadership in April 1972, Wilson appointed Walden to a junior position on Labour's shadow treasury team. In October 1972, Walden attacked Dick Taverne's "apostasy" for leaving the Labour Party: "Of course an MP must have strong opinions of his own, and I have defied the Labour Party whip more than Dick Taverne has. We owe the Labour Party an unpayable debt and Dick has ratted on a lifetime of obligation".

At a December 1973 meeting of the Parliamentary Labour Party on the party's state, Walden doubted whether party unity and getting policies across to the public would alone suffice. The party's failure lay in not answering the questions ordinary people were asking. After Edward Heath called the February 1974 general election, Walden called it a "fraudulent and rather ridiculous election": "The fault lies with the Prime Minister. I have as yet read no explanation of why the national interest requires that there should be a strike and an election before miners can be paid money they could be given without either taking place". Walden lamented that "the nation has been invited to nourish its fear and express class malice... I am living through the death of all my hopes of what this country could be". He called Heath's belief that the election was called to ensure moderation "the most staggering misjudgment of my political lifetime".

After Labour's return to office after the election, Walden declined the office of Minister of State for Industry by citing "personal reasons". The Selly Oak Constituency Labour Party passed a resolution criticising his "massive consultancy fees", which Walden earned as a parliamentary consultant to, among others, the Business Equipment Trades Association, the Amusement Trades Association and the Amusement Caterers Association.

The Birmingham pub bombings of 21 November 1974 occurred in Walden's constituency. The Commons soon debated whether the death penalty should be restored for terrorist murderers. Walden opened the debate by opposing capital punishment and declaring it to be "judicial execution" and "a cold-blooded act of the state to take a life". During the 1975 referendum on Britain's membership of the EEC, Walden spoke in favour of Britain remaining a member. Walden told the Commons: "I think that the anti-Market campaign will in the end... degenerate into narrow nationalism, the plea for a siege economy, for Socialism in one country. I was never very enchanted by the rhapsodies of the Eurofanatics but I certainly prefer their version of the future to that grim and barren alternative which it seems to me the anti-Marketeers will end up with".

Walden became disillusioned with the Labour Party by the rise of the left and in May 1975, after Margaret Thatcher was elected Conservative leader, told Conservative Chief Whip Humphrey Atkins that he could bring six Labour MPs with him in crossing the floor. According to a Thatcher biographer, Charles Moore, Walden was "considered the most eloquent of his generation of Labour MPs" and was "more clear-sighted than most in seeing that Mrs Thatcher stood for real change". He also wrote that "as a grammar school meritocrat who had originally looked for social progress from the Labour Party, Walden recognized her as offering what he sought".

At a meeting of the Warley East Labour Party in February 1976, Walden defended the government's policy and the benefits of the mixed economy against Stuart Holland's proposals for more socialist policies. In the Labour leadership election that was held after Harold Wilson announced his resignation, Walden voted for Michael Foot, rather than James Callaghan, because he considered Foot "a man of principle". After the first 100 days of Callaghan's premiership, Walden remarked: "If I had thought he was going to be as good as this I would have voted for him".

In November 1976, Walden joined the fellow right-wing Labour MP John Mackintosh in abstaining on the vote for the government's Dock Works Regulation Bill and thereby wrecked its passage through Parliament. The Bill would have ensured that dock workers within five miles of any port or important inland waterway belonged to the Transport and General Workers' Union. The executive committee of Walden's constituency Labour Party supported his stance although left-wing demonstrators criticised him. After the 1977 Budget, Walden said, "Our level of direct taxation—income tax—is ludicrously high, and our rate of indirect taxation is not taking enough of the burden".

He campaigned for the liberalisation of cannabis and gambling laws. He was nicknamed by some "the bookies' MP" when he was revealed to be receiving more from the National Association of Bookmakers than his parliamentary salary.

On 16 June 1977, Walden resigned from the House of Commons by taking the Chiltern Hundreds to become a full-time journalist and broadcaster. Walden said, "I am not leaving because of any disenchantment with the Government. I have gone for positive, not negative reasons".

== Journalistic career ==
Walden went on to present television programmes, mostly for London Weekend Television, such as Weekend World, The Walden Interview and Walden. He was also a member of the board of Central Television between 1981 and 1984.

In 1978, Walden told Conservative MP Bernard Weatherill that "the only way the Tories can lose the next general election is if they are not Conservative enough". By 1979, Walden passionately believed that trade union power should be broken, telling Margaret Thatcher that "the trade unions have become an estate of the realm, above the law". The week after this conversation, Walden's programme focused on the necessity of legislation against secondary action by trade unions.

In 1981, Geoffrey Wansell claimed that Weekend World had become "the flagship of national current affairs shows, quietly stealing the title from its more august rival at the BBC, Panorama":

The secret of Weekend World's success, I suspect, lies in the character of its presenter and interviewer. Lacking the suave public school confidence of his predecessor in the job, Peter Jay, Walden runs on adrenalin and a determination to wring a bit of political revelation and a slice of history out of whichever politician happens to be in the studio with him. In spite of his voice, which vibrates on eardrums like a buzz-saw, Walden has become the second best political interviewer on television—only Sir Robin Day is better. ... Explaining his success, Walden simply says: "I know I understand politicians, but even more I detest ambiguity. It's always my instinct to ask people exactly what they mean."

During an interview with Thatcher in 1983, Walden coined the term "Victorian values" to describe her beliefs, which she accepted and repeated on numerous occasions. Walden wrote Thatcher's speech to the Wembley rally during the 1983 general election campaign. In 1988, he called Thatcher "a unique politician...the master spirit of our age".

After Rupert Murdoch moved the production of The Sunday Times from Fleet Street to a new plant in Wapping in January 1986, the print unions voted to strike in protest. Many journalists deserted the paper, but Walden lent it his support by becoming one of its senior columnists. He wrote to the paper's editor, Andrew Neil: "I don't need to write for The Sunday Times. I want to". In April 1988, Walden joined Norman Tebbit, Lord Chapple and Lord Marsh in founding the Radical Society, designed to combat "privilege, hierarchy, bureaucracy and collectivism" and to put in their place individualist solutions.

On 26 October 1989, the Chancellor, Nigel Lawson, resigned because Thatcher was unwilling to sack her economics adviser, Sir Alan Walters. Although the interview had been planned months in advance, Walden interviewed Thatcher for the 29 October edition of The Walden Interview. Walden told Thatcher's confidante Woodrow Wyatt on the day Lawson resigned that he wanted Wyatt to ask Thatcher what questions he should put to her so that he could phrase them in a helpful way. However, as John Campbell notes, Walden's "journalistic instinct and her lack of candour made for a devastating exposé, watched by three million people with their Sunday lunch". Although Thatcher repeatedly claimed that Lawson's position was "unassailable", she floundered when Walden asked what Campbell calls "the killer question":

Walden: "Do you deny that Nigel would have stayed if you had sacked Professor Alan Walters?"
Thatcher: "I don't know. I don't know."
Walden: "You never even thought to ask him that?"
Thatcher: "I ... that is not ... I don't know. Nigel had determined that he was going to put in his resignation. I did everything possible to stop him."
Walden: "But..."
Thatcher: "I was not successful. No, you're going on asking the same question."
Walden: "Of course, but that's a terrible admission, Prime Minister."
Thatcher: "I have nothing further to ... I don't know ... of course I just don't know ... I'm not going on with this."

Later in the interview, Walden put to her:

Walden: "You come over as being someone who one of your backbenchers said is slightly off her trolley, authoritarian, domineering, refusing to listen to anybody else – why? Why cannot you publicly project what you have just told me is your private character?"
Thatcher: "Brian, if anyone's coming over as domineering in this interview, it's you."

Though Thatcher and Walden were described as "old friends", and Walden was on the record confirming that Thatcher was his favourite interviewee, the pair reportedly never spoke again after this interview. The following Sunday, Walden interviewed Lawson. In his memoirs, Lawson said that Walden was "at that time probably the most formidable and serious political interviewer in the business".

Upon leaving Weekend World as presenter in 1986, Walden was succeeded by Matthew Parris, formerly Conservative MP for West Derbyshire; the series came to an end two years later. The programme was axed by LWT director of programmes Greg Dyke, who needed to save money. In his autobiography, Dyke noted that the Walden one-on-one interview was the most popular part of the programme, and was also the cheapest to make. As a result, Walden was brought back to LWT to host the Sunday lunchtime programme The Walden Interview in 1988–89, which was renamed Walden and ran between 1990 and 1994 in the same slot.

In 1998 Brian Walden presented a series of essays on prominent figures, giving his own take, uninterrupted and directly to camera, on Winston Churchill, Abraham Lincoln, Alexander the Great, John F. Kennedy, Nelson Mandela and Mahatma Gandhi.

In 2005, Walden presented 10-minute programmes, A Point of View, on BBC Radio 4, in a spot formerly occupied by Alistair Cooke's Letter From America.

== Political satire ==
As a well known public figure, Walden appeared in cameo as an interviewer for political comedy shows such as The New Statesman. He was the subject of parody in Spitting Image as a puppet with a slight speech impediment, voiced by impressionist Steve Nallon.

== Personal life and death ==
Walden lived in Guernsey in retirement. He was married three times; to Sybil Blackstone, Jane McKerron, then Hazel Downes (for 43 years). He had four sons, including the actor Ben Walden. He opposed the ban on fox-hunting, and was a strong supporter of Brexit.

Walden died on 9 May 2019 aged 86 at his home in Guernsey from complications connected to emphysema.

Following his death, colleagues paid tribute. Andrew Neil wrote: "A wonderful interrogator of politicians, especially on Weekend World. With Robin Day, he invented the British political interview style. Emulated but not matched to this day."

== In popular culture ==
Walden's 1989 interview with Thatcher, and the years leading up to it, were dramatised in James Graham's 2025 Channel 4 series Brian and Maggie, with Steve Coogan portraying Walden.

Parliament of the United Kingdom
Preceded by John Hollingworth	Member of Parliament for Birmingham All Saints; 1964 – February 1974	Constituency abolished
Preceded by Doris Fisher	Member of Parliament for Birmingham Ladywood; February 1974 – 1977	Succeeded by John Sever
