= Birmingham Ladywood =

Parliamentary constituency in the United Kingdom, 1918 onwards

Coordinates: 52.48°N 1.89°W

- Borough constituency for the House of Commons
- Boundaries since 2024
- Boundary of Birmingham Ladywood in West Midlands region
- County: West Midlands
- Population: 126,693 (2011 census)
- Electorate: 76,585 (2023)

Current constituency
- Created: 1918
- Member of Parliament: Shabana Mahmood (Labour)
- Seats: One
- Created from: Birmingham West and Birmingham North

Birmingham Ladywood is a constituency (Note: A borough constituency (for the purposes of election expenses and type of returning officer)) in the city of Birmingham, which was created in 1918. The seat has been represented in the House of Commons of the Parliament of the United Kingdom by Shabana Mahmood of the Labour Party since 2010. (Note: As with all constituencies, the constituency elects one Member of Parliament (MP) by the first past the post system of election at least every five years.) Mahmood currently serves as Home Secretary under the government of Andy Burnham.

== Boundaries ==
Map of 2010-2024 boundaries

1918–1950: The County Borough of Birmingham wards of Ladywood and Rotton Park.

1950–1955: The County Borough of Birmingham wards of All Saints', Ladywood, and Rotton Park.

1955–1974: The County Borough of Birmingham wards of Duddeston, Ladywood, and St Paul's.

1974–1983: The County Borough of Birmingham wards of All Saints', Ladywood, Rotton Park, and Soho.

1983–1997: The City of Birmingham wards of Ladywood, Sandwell, and Soho.

1997–2010: The City of Birmingham wards of Aston, Ladywood, Nechells, and Soho (as they existed on 1 June 1994).

2010–2018: The City of Birmingham wards of Aston, Ladywood, Nechells, and Soho (as they existed on 12 April 2005).

2018–2024: Following a local government boundary review, which did not effect the parliamentary boundaries, the contents of the constituency were as follows with effect from May 2018:

- The City of Birmingham wards of Ladywood, Nechells, Newtown, and Soho & Jewellery Quarter, most of Aston, Bordesley & Highgate, and Bordesley Green, about half of North Edgbaston, and small parts of Holyhead, and Lozells.

2024–present: Further to the 2023 periodic review of Westminster constituencies which came into effect for the 2024 general election, the constituency comprises:

- The City of Birmingham wards of Alum Rock; Balsall Heath West; Bordesley & Highgate; Bordesley Green; Ladywood; Nechells; Newtown; Soho & Jewellery Quarter.

After adjusting the boundaries to take into account the revised ward structure, the Aston ward was transferred to Birmingham Perry Barr and the North Edgbaston ward to Birmingham Edgbaston, offset by the gain of the Balsall Heath West ward from Birmingham Hall Green and the Alum Rock ward from Birmingham Hodge Hill.

== Constituency profile ==
Birmingham Ladywood includes Birmingham City Centre along with the areas of Ladywood, Alum Rock, Nechells, Newtown Bordesley Green, Bordesley & Highgate and Soho & Jewellery Quarter. The area is one of the most multicultural in Birmingham and the whole of the United Kingdom; in 1971, 29.6% of the constituency was non-White. In 1981, 42% of the constituency were non-White. In the 1991 census, 55.6% of the constituency population were ethnic minorities, the highest in England at the time. In the recession of 2008–09, it was the first place in the UK where the unemployment claimant count rate exceeded 10%, breaching that level in January 2009. In July 2008, Ladywood had the highest unemployment rate in the whole of the West Midlands (by the international standardised measure, which is usually higher than the claimant count) at just over 18%, compared with neighbouring Birmingham seats Perry Barr (8.1%), Sparkbrook and Small Heath (13.9%), and Yardley (7%). For the year ending September 2014, the unemployment rate was 12.4%, although the employment rate had increased only slightly, from 46.1% to 46.6% (compared with 69.7% for the West Midlands as a whole).

The average house price in Ladywood (ward not constituency) was just under £155,000 in 2019, much lower than the national average of just over £288,000.

== History ==
Summary of results

The constituency has undergone several boundary changes since its creation in 1918 but has remained a safe Labour seat since the Second World War, with the exception of a by-election in 1969 when Wallace Lawler won the seat for the Liberal Party and the immediately surrounding period when its majority was marginal. The seat was regained for Labour by Doris Fisher at the 1970 general election. The 2015 general election result made the seat the sixth-safest of Labour's 232 seats by percentage of majority.

Notable representatives

The constituency's first MP was the future Conservative Prime Minister Neville Chamberlain, who transferred to the Edgbaston seat in 1929. The current MP is Shabana Mahmood, one of the UK's first three female Muslim MPs.

The first campaign for this constituency in 1918 was notable because the Liberal Party candidate was Mrs Margery Corbett Ashby, one of only seventeen women candidates to contest a parliamentary election at the first opportunity. Chamberlain reacted to this intervention by being one of the few male candidates to specifically target women voters; deploying his wife, issuing a special leaflet headed "A word to the Ladies" and holding two meetings in the afternoon.

== Members of Parliament ==
Election	Member	Party
1918	Neville Chamberlain	Conservative
1929	Wilfrid Whiteley	Labour
1931	Geoffrey Lloyd	Conservative
1945	Victor Yates	Labour
1969 by-election	Wallace Lawler	Liberal
1970	Doris Fisher	Labour
Feb 1974	Brian Walden	Labour
1977 by-election	John Sever	Labour
1983	Clare Short	Labour
2006	Clare Short	Independent
2010	Shabana Mahmood	Labour

Clare Short, elected as a Labour MP from the 1983 general election onwards, resigned the Labour whip on 20 October 2006 and wished it to be known that she would continue to sit in the Commons as an independent MP.

== Elections ==
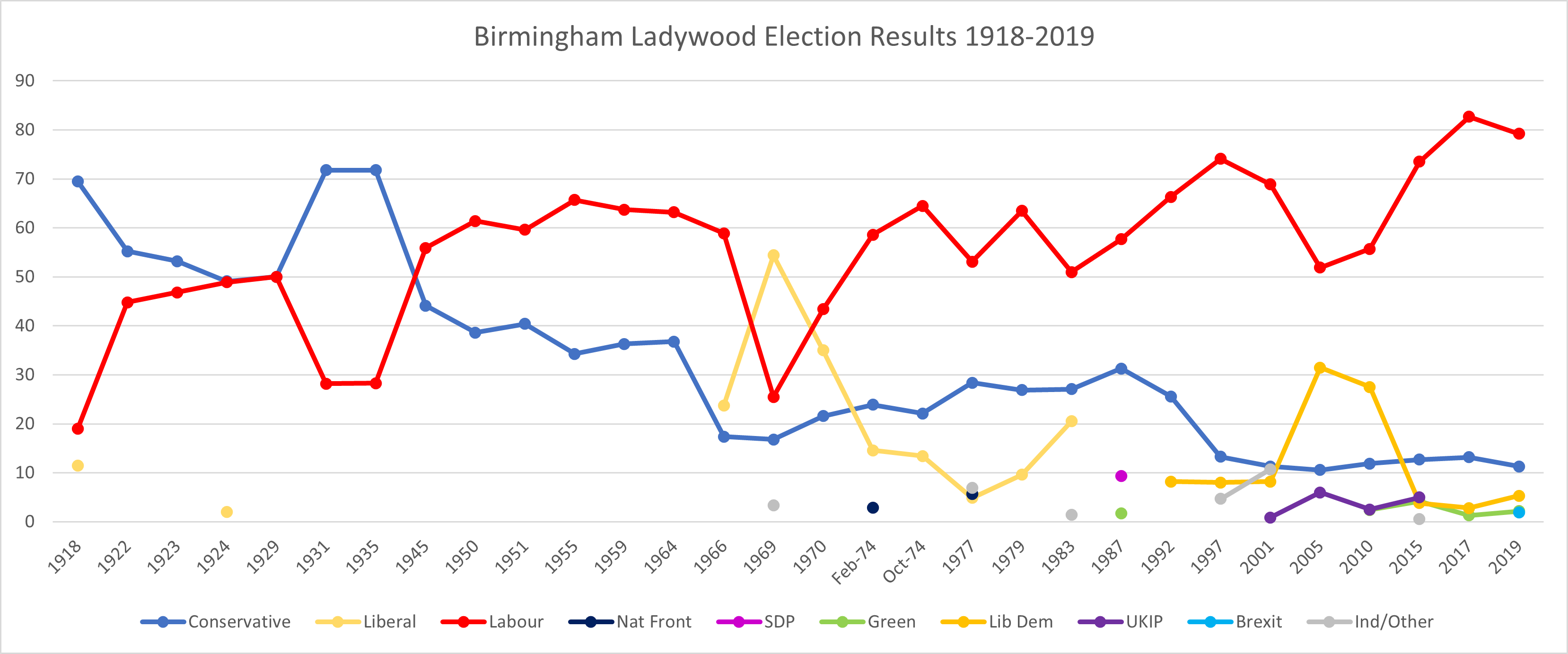

=== Elections in the 2020s ===
General election 2024: Birmingham Ladywood
Party	Candidate	Votes	%	±%
Labour	Shabana Mahmood	15,558	42.5	▼36.7
Independent (Note: Yakoob contested the election as an independent, but received endorsement from the Workers Party of Britain.)	Akhmed Yakoob	12,137	33.2	new
Green	Zoe Challenor	3,478	9.5	▲7.3
Conservative	Shazna Muzammil	2,218	6.1	▼5.2
Liberal Democrats	Lee Dargue	1,711	4.7	▼0.6
Reform	Irene Yoong-Henery	1,477	4.0	▲2.0
Majority		3,421	9.3	▼58.6
Turnout		36,579	43.7	▼12.5
Labour hold		Swing	▼	

=== Elections in the 2010s ===
General election 2019: Birmingham Ladywood
Party	Candidate	Votes	%	±%
Labour	Shabana Mahmood	33,355	79.2	−3.5
Conservative	Mary Noone	4,773	11.3	−1.9
Liberal Democrats	Lee Dargue	2,228	5.3	+2.5
Green	Alex Nettle	931	2.2	+0.9
Brexit Party	Andrew Garcarz	831	2.0	New
Majority		28,582	67.9	−1.6
Turnout		42,118	56.2	−2.8
Labour hold		Swing	−0.8	

General election 2017: Birmingham Ladywood
Party	Candidate	Votes	%	±%
Labour	Shabana Mahmood	34,166	82.7	+9.1
Conservative	Andrew Browning	5,452	13.2	+0.5
Liberal Democrats	Lee Dargue	1,156	2.8	−1.0
Green	Kefentse Dennis	533	1.3	−2.9
Majority		28,714	69.5	+8.6
Turnout		41,307	59.0	+6.3
Labour hold		Swing	+4.3	

General election 2015: Birmingham Ladywood
Party	Candidate	Votes	%	±%
Labour	Shabana Mahmood	26,444	73.6	+17.9
Conservative	Isabel Sigmac	4,576	12.7	+0.8
UKIP	Clair Braund	1,805	5.0	+2.5
Green	Margaret Okole	1,501	4.2	+1.8
Liberal Democrats	Shazad Iqbal	1,374	3.8	−23.7
Liberty GB	Tim Burton	216	0.6	New
Majority		21,868	60.9	+32.7
Turnout		35,916	52.7	+4.0
Labour hold		Swing	+8.6	

General election 2010: Birmingham Ladywood
Party	Candidate	Votes	%	±%
Labour	Shabana Mahmood	19,950	55.7	+3.0
Liberal Democrats	Ayoub Khan	9,845	27.5	−1.9
Conservative	Nusrat M. Ghani	4,277	11.9	+3.5
UKIP	Christopher Booth	902	2.5	−3.0
Green	Peter C. Beck	859	2.4	+2.1
Majority		10,105	28.2	+5.9
Turnout		35,833	48.7	+3.5
Labour hold		Swing	+2.5	

=== Elections in the 2000s ===
General election 2005: Birmingham Ladywood
Party	Candidate	Votes	%	±%
Labour	Clare Short	17,262	51.9	−17.0
Liberal Democrats	Ayoub Khan	10,461	31.5	+23.3
Conservative	Philippa Stroud	3,515	10.6	−0.7
UKIP	Lyn Nazemi-Afshar	2,008	6.0	+5.1
Majority		6,801	20.4	−37.2
Turnout		33,246	46.8	+2.5
Labour hold		Swing	−20.1	

General election 2001: Birmingham Ladywood
Party	Candidate	Votes	%	±%
Labour	Clare Short	21,694	68.9	−5.2
Conservative	Benjamin H. Prentice	3,551	11.3	−2.0
Liberal Democrats	S. Mahmood Chaudhry	2,586	8.2	+0.2
People's Justice	Allah Ditta	2,112	6.7	New
Socialist Labour	Surinder P. Virdee	443	1.4	New
Muslim Party	Mahmood Hussain	432	1.4	New
ProLife Alliance	James Caffery	392	1.2	New
UKIP	Anneliese Nattrass	283	0.9	New
Majority		18,143	57.6	−2.8
Turnout		31,493	44.3	−9.9
Labour hold		Swing	−1.6	

=== Elections in the 1990s ===
General election 1997: Birmingham Ladywood
Party	Candidate	Votes	%	±%
Labour	Clare Short	28,134	74.1	+2.7
Conservative	Shailesh Vara	5,052	13.3	−7.1
Liberal Democrats	Sardul Singh Marwa	3,020	8.0	−0.2
Referendum	Ruth A. Gurney	1,086	2.9	New
National Democrats	Andrew Carmichael	685	1.8	New
Majority		23,082	60.8	+9.8
Turnout		37,977	54.2	−11.7
Labour hold		Swing	+4.9	

General election 1992: Birmingham Ladywood
Party	Candidate	Votes	%	±%
Labour	Clare Short	24,887	66.3	+8.6
Conservative	Barbara S. Ashford	9,604	25.6	−5.7
Liberal Democrats	Brian L. Worth	3,068	8.2	−1.1
Majority		15,283	40.7	+14.4
Turnout		37,559	65.9	+1.1
Labour hold		Swing	+7.1	

=== Elections in the 1980s ===
General election 1987: Birmingham Ladywood
Party	Candidate	Votes	%	±%
Labour	Clare Short	21,971	57.7	+6.7
Conservative	Simon Lee	11,943	31.3	+4.2
SDP	Gurdial Singh Sangha	3,532	9.3	−11.2
Green	Joyce Millington	650	1.7	New
Majority		10,028	26.4	+2.5
Turnout		38,096	64.8	+2.2
Labour hold		Swing		

General election 1983: Birmingham Ladywood
Party	Candidate	Votes	%	±%
Labour	Clare Short	19,278	51.0	−3.1
Conservative	Pramilia Le Hunte	10,248	27.1	−10.6
Liberal	Kenneth Hardeman	7,758	20.5	+12.5
Stop Deportation of Black People	Baba Bakhtaura	355	0.9	New
Workers Revolutionary	Rodney Atkinson	198	0.5	New
Majority		9,030	23.9	−7.5
Turnout		37,837	62.6	
Labour hold		Swing		

=== Elections in the 1970s ===
General election 1979: Birmingham Ladywood
Party	Candidate	Votes	%	±%
Labour	John Sever	13,450	63.5	−1.0
Conservative	A. Newhouse	5,691	26.9	+4.8
Liberal	Kenneth George Hardeman	2,030	9.6	−3.8
Majority		7,759	36.6	−5.8
Turnout		21,071	62.3	+5.4
Labour hold		Swing	−2.9	

1977 Birmingham Ladywood by-election
Party	Candidate	Votes	%	±%
Labour	John Sever	8,227	53.1	−11.4
Conservative	Quentin Davies	4,402	28.4	+6.3
National Front	Anthony Reed Herbert	888	5.7	New
Liberal	Kenneth George Hardeman	765	4.9	−8.5
Socialist Unity	Raghib Ahsan	534	3.5	New
Independent	James Hunte	336	2.2	New
Independent Conservative	George Matthews	71	0.5	New
Reform Party	Peter Courtney	63	0.4	New
Air Road Public Safety	Bill Boaks	46	0.3	New
Majority		3,825	24.7	−17.7
Turnout		15,484		
Labour hold		Swing	-8.84	

General election October 1974: Birmingham Ladywood
Party	Candidate	Votes	%	±%
Labour	Brian Walden	14,818	64.5	+5.9
Conservative	Richard Lawn	5,079	22.1	−1.8
Liberal	Kenneth George Hardeman	3,086	13.4	−1.2
Majority		9,739	42.4	+7.7
Turnout		22,983	56.9	−7.3
Labour hold		Swing		

General election February 1974: Birmingham Ladywood
Party	Candidate	Votes	%	±%
Labour	Brian Walden	15,126	58.6	+15.2
Conservative	Richard Lawn	6,164	23.9	+2.3
Liberal	Kenneth George Hardeman	3,753	14.6	−20.4
National Front	John Alexander Alfred Davis	751	2.9	New
Majority		8,962	34.7	+26.3
Turnout		25,794	64.2	+2.0
Labour hold		Swing		

General election 1970: Birmingham Ladywood
Party	Candidate	Votes	%	±%
Labour	Doris Fisher	5,067	43.4	−15.5
Liberal	Wallace Lawler	4,087	35.0	+11.3
Conservative	Charles Lawrence Wade	2,523	21.6	+4.2
Majority		980	8.4	−26.8
Turnout		11,677	62.2	+2.5
Labour gain from Liberal		Swing		

=== Elections in the 1960s ===
1969 Birmingham Ladywood by-election
Party	Candidate	Votes	%	±%
Liberal	Wallace Lawler	5,104	54.4	+30.7
Labour	Doris Fisher	2,391	25.5	−33.6
Conservative	Louis Glass	1,580	16.8	−0.6
British Movement	Colin Jordan	282	3.0	New
Fellowship	James Haigh	34	0.4	New
Majority		2,713	28.9	
Turnout		9,391		
Liberal gain from Labour		Swing		

General election 1966: Birmingham Ladywood
Party	Candidate	Votes	%	±%
Labour	Victor Yates	8,895	58.9	−4.3
Liberal	Wallace Lawler	3,580	23.7	New
Conservative	Thomas G. John	2,621	17.4	−19.4
Majority		5,315	35.2	+10.8
Turnout		15,096	59.7	+6.0
Labour hold		Swing		

General election 1964: Birmingham Ladywood
Party	Candidate	Votes	%	±%
Labour	Victor Yates	10,098	63.2	–0.5
Conservative	Thomas G. John	5,879	36.8	+0.5
Majority		4,219	26.4	−1.0
Turnout		15,977	53.7	−5.4
Labour hold		Swing	−0.5	

=== Elections in the 1950s ===
General election 1959: Birmingham Ladywood
Party	Candidate	Votes	%	±%
Labour	Victor Yates	14,717	63.7	−2.0
Conservative	Thomas G. John	8,393	36.3	+2.0
Majority		6,324	27.4	−4.0
Turnout		23,110	59.1	−0.9
Labour hold		Swing	−2.0	

General election 1955: Birmingham Ladywood
Party	Candidate	Votes	%	±%
Labour	Victor Yates	18,476	65.7	+6.1
Conservative	Peter W Hodgens	9,665	34.3	−6.1
Majority		8,811	31.4	+12.2
Turnout		28,141	60.0	−17.4
Labour hold		Swing	+6.1	

General election 1951: Birmingham Ladywood
Party	Candidate	Votes	%	±%
Labour	Victor Yates	24,088	59.6	−1.8
Conservative	Leslie Seymour	16,331	40.4	+1.8
Majority		7,757	19.2	−3.6
Turnout		40,419	77.4	−3.0
Labour hold		Swing	−1.8	

General election 1950: Birmingham Ladywood
Party	Candidate	Votes	%	±%
Labour	Victor Yates	25,603	61.4	+5.5
Conservative	Frederic Bennett	16,071	38.6	−5.5
Majority		9,532	22.8	+11.0
Turnout		41,674	80.4	+10.3
Labour hold		Swing	+5.5	

=== Elections in the 1940s ===
General election 1945: Birmingham Ladywood
Party	Candidate	Votes	%	±%
Labour	Victor Yates	13,503	55.9	+27.6
Conservative	Geoffrey Lloyd	10,657	44.1	−27.7
Majority		2,846	11.8	
Turnout		24,160	70.1	+4.1
Labour gain from Conservative		Swing	+27.7	

=== Elections in the 1930s ===
General election 1935: Birmingham Ladywood
Party	Candidate	Votes	%	±%
Conservative	Geoffrey Lloyd	18,565	71.8	0.0
Labour	Hubert Humphreys	7,311	28.3	+0.1
Majority		11,254	43.5	−0.1
Turnout		25,876	66.0	−12.1
Conservative hold		Swing		

General election 1931: Birmingham Ladywood
Party	Candidate	Votes	%	±%
Conservative	Geoffrey Lloyd	23,057	71.8	+21.8
Labour	Wilfrid Whiteley	9,057	28.2	−21.8
Majority		14,000	43.6	
Turnout		32,114	78.1	
Conservative gain from Labour		Swing		

=== Elections in the 1920s ===
General election 1929: Birmingham Ladywood
Party	Candidate	Votes	%	±%
Labour	Wilfrid Whiteley	16,447	50.02	+1.1
Unionist	Geoffrey William Lloyd	16,436	49.98	+0.9
Majority		11	0.04	
Turnout		32,883		
Labour gain from Unionist		Swing		

General election 1924: Birmingham Ladywood
Party	Candidate	Votes	%	±%
Unionist	Neville Chamberlain	13,374	49.1	−4.1
Labour	Oswald Mosley	13,297	48.9	+2.1
Liberal	Alfred William Bowkett	539	2.0	New
Majority		77	0.2	−3.8
Turnout		27,200	80.5	+8.5
Unionist hold		Swing	−2.0	

General election 1923: Birmingham Ladywood
Party	Candidate	Votes	%	±%
Unionist	Neville Chamberlain	12,884	53.2	−2.0
Labour	Robert Dunstan	11,330	46.8	+2.0
Majority		1,554	6.4	−4.0
Turnout		24,214	72.0	+1.5
Unionist hold		Swing	−2.0	

General election 1922: Birmingham Ladywood
Party	Candidate	Votes	%	±%
Unionist	Neville Chamberlain	13,032	55.2	−14.3
Labour	Robert Dunstan	10,589	44.8	+25.8
Majority		2,443	10.4	−40.1
Turnout		23,621	70.5	+29.9
Unionist hold		Swing	−20.0	

=== Elections in the 1910s ===
M. Corbett Ashby

General election 1918: Birmingham Ladywood
Party		Candidate	Votes	%	±%
C	Unionist	Neville Chamberlain	9,405	69.5	
	Labour	John Kneeshaw	2,572	19.0	
	Liberal	Margery Corbett Ashby	1,552	11.5	
Majority			6,833	50.5	
Turnout			13,529	40.6	
	Unionist win (new seat)				
C indicates candidate endorsed by the coalition government.

== See also ==
- Parliamentary constituencies in the West Midlands (county)
- List of parliamentary constituencies in West Midlands (region)

== Notes ==
Parliament of the United Kingdom
Preceded by Bewdley	Constituency represented by the chancellor of the Exchequer; 1923–1924	Succeeded by Colne Valley
