= Anthony Reed Herbert =

British lawyer

- Born: United Kingdom
- Occupation: Lawyer

Anthony Reed Herbert was a leading member of the British National Front (NF) during the 1970s, organising the party in Leicester and serving as its chief legal adviser (he was a solicitor by profession).

Reed Herbert attended Rugby School. One of his fellow pupils was the author Salman Rushdie. In his autobiography, Joseph Anton: A Memoir, Rushdie believes that his bullying of Reed Herbert at Rugby may have later influenced his racist views.

Having previously been chairman of his local Young Conservatives, Reed Herbert became disillusioned with the Tories in 1972 when a Party Conference motion sponsored by Enoch Powell, condemning the government for admitting Ugandan Asian refugees, was defeated. He subsequently joined the NF and swiftly rose to the leadership. To counter accusations from the 'populist' faction of the NF that the leadership was too right wing, in June 1974 he was co-opted onto the NF's Directorate; not being tainted with a fascist past like so many of the NF leaders, he was acceptable as a moderate in the populists' eyes. As a consequence, it was Reed Herbert who cast the deciding vote which unseated John Tyndall as leader and gave the leadership to John Kingsley Read in 1974. Although he thus became associated with the populist wing of the party, he stopped short of joining the National Party when Tyndall regained control and the populists left, instead remaining within the NF. This is not to say that his views are moderate in the wider sense. He is quoted as saying:

The immigrants and the British are racially and genetically incompatible, which is why immigrants must be repatriated. I wish them all the luck in the world, but not here.... I experience tension whenever I see a group of Indians walking down the street. I feel they are alien, a threatening presence.

He contested the Leicester East constituency for the NF in the October 1974 general election, polling 2967 votes (6%). He also stood as NF candidate in the by-election for the Birmingham Ladywood constituency on 18 August 1977, polling 888 votes (5.7%) and forcing the Liberal candidate into fourth place.

In 1979, Reed Herbert broke with the NF to lead his own British Democratic Party. He went on to merge the party into the newly formed British National Party in 1982.

== Elections contested ==
| Date of election | Constituency | Party | Votes | % |
|---|---|---|---|---|
| October 1974 general election | Leicester East | NF | 2967 | 6.0 |
| 18 August 1977 by election | Birmingham Ladywood | NF | 888 | 5.7 |
