= Hubert Humphrey 1968 presidential campaign =

American political campaign

Hubert Humphrey for President 1968
- Campaign: 1968 U.S. presidential election
- Candidate: Hubert Humphrey; 38th Vice President of the United States (1965–1969); Edmund Muskie; U.S. Senator from Maine (1959–1980)
- Affiliation: Democratic Party
- Status: Announced: April 27, 1968 (Note: Committee carried over from the Johnson campaign following his withdrawal from the race.); Official nominee: August 29, 1968; Lost election: November 5, 1968
- Slogan(s): Some People Talk Change, Others Cause It; Humphrey-Muskie, Two You Can Trust

The 1968 presidential campaign of Hubert Humphrey began when Hubert Humphrey, the 38th and incumbent vice president of the United States, decided to seek the Democratic Party nomination for president of the United States on April 27, 1968, after incumbent President Lyndon B. Johnson withdrew his bid for reelection to a second full term on March 31, 1968, and endorsed him as his successor. Johnson withdrew after an unexpectedly strong challenge from anti-Vietnam War presidential candidate, Senator Eugene McCarthy of Minnesota, in the early Democratic primaries. McCarthy, along with Senator Robert F. Kennedy of New York, became Humphrey's main opponents for the nomination. Their "new politics" contrasted with Humphrey's "old politics" as the increasingly unpopular Vietnam War intensified.

Humphrey entered the race too late to participate in the Democratic primaries. He relied on "favorite son" candidates to win delegates and lobbied for endorsements from powerful bosses to obtain slates of delegates. The other candidates, who strove to win the nomination through popular support, criticized Humphrey's traditional approach. The June 1968 assassination of Robert Kennedy left McCarthy as Humphrey's only major opponent. That changed at the 1968 Democratic National Convention when Senator George McGovern of South Dakota entered the race as the successor of Kennedy. Humphrey won the party's nomination at the convention on the first ballot, amid protests in Chicago. He selected little-known Senator Edmund Muskie of Maine as his running mate. Humphrey was the last nominee who did not participate in the primaries until Vice President Kamala Harris in 2024.

During the general election, Humphrey faced former Vice President Richard Nixon of California, the Republican Party nominee, and Governor of Alabama George Wallace, the American Independent Party nominee. Nixon led in most polls throughout the campaign, and successfully criticized Humphrey's role in the Vietnam War, connecting him to the unpopular president and the general disorder in the nation. Humphrey experienced a surge in the polls in the days prior to the election, largely due to incremental progress in the peace process in Vietnam and a break with the Johnson war policy. On Election Day, Humphrey narrowly fell short of Nixon in the popular vote, but lost, by a large margin, in the Electoral College. Had Humphrey been elected, he would have been the first U.S. president from Minnesota, the first born in South Dakota, and the first incumbent vice president since Martin Van Buren to be elected; this feat would be eventually accomplished 20 years later by George H. W. Bush. Muskie would have been the second vice president from Maine, after Hannibal Hamlin, and the first Catholic vice president; this feat would be eventually accomplished 40 years later by Joe Biden, who would become the first Catholic vice president.

== Background ==
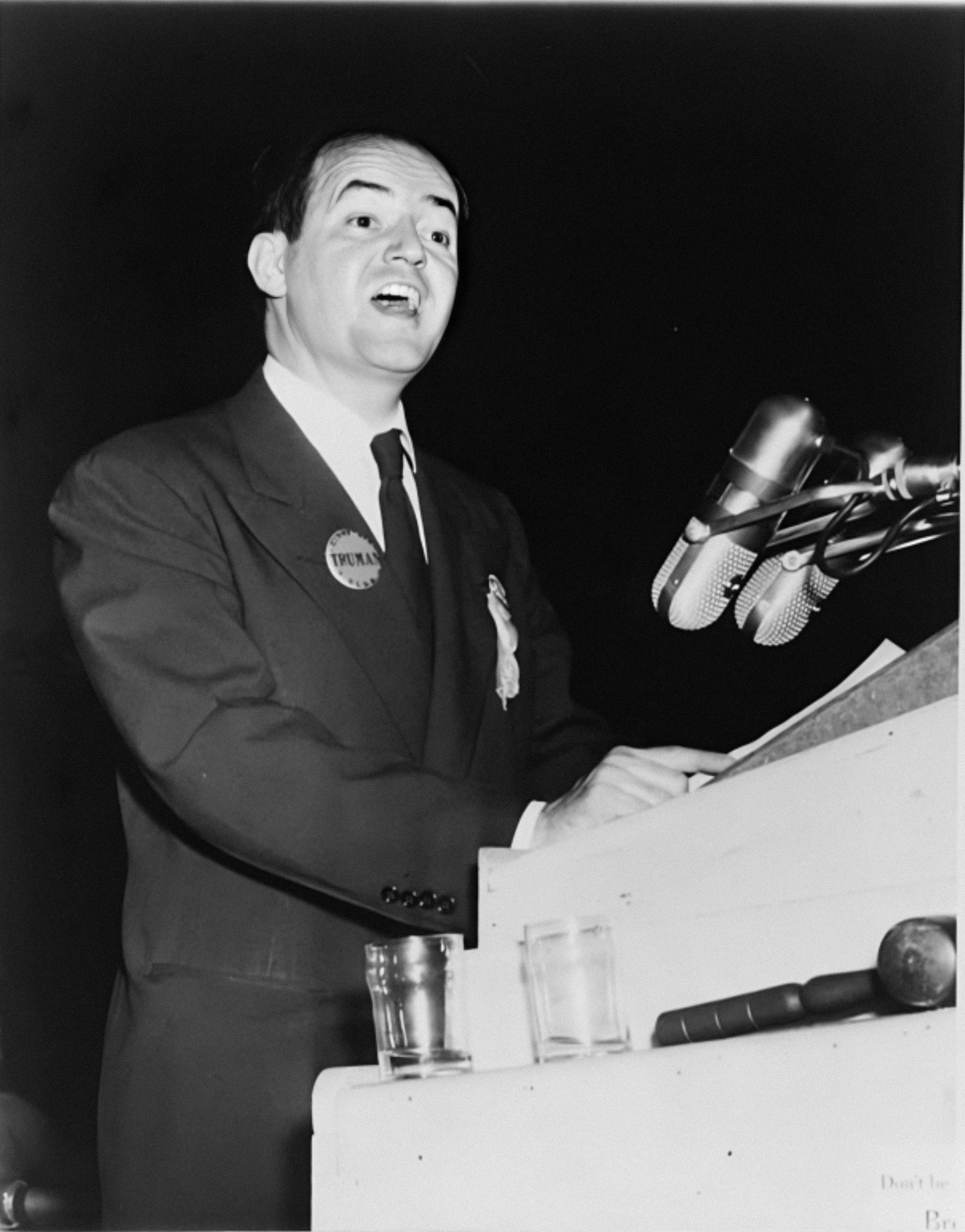
Humphrey speaks at the 1948 Democratic National Convention.

Hubert Humphrey was first elected to public office in 1945 as Mayor of Minneapolis. He served two, two-year terms, and gained a reputation as an anti-Communist and ardent supporter of the Civil Rights Movement. He gave a rousing speech at the 1948 Democratic National Convention arguing for the adoption of a pro-Civil Rights plank, exclaiming "The time has arrived in America for the Democratic Party to get out of the shadow of states' rights and to walk forthrightly into the bright sunshine of human rights." That same year, Minnesota voters elected him to the United States Senate, where he worked closely with Senate Majority Leader Lyndon Johnson. Humphrey's persona and tactics in the Senate led colleagues to nickname him "The Happy Warrior". Contemporaries attributed his success in politics to his likable personality and ability to connect with voters on a personal level.

Humphrey first entered presidential politics in 1952, running as a favorite son candidate in Minnesota. In 1960, he mounted a full-scale run, winning primaries in South Dakota and Washington D.C.; ultimately losing the Democratic nomination to Massachusetts Senator and future President John F. Kennedy. In 1964, with Lyndon Johnson now as president following the assassination of Kennedy, Johnson tapped Humphrey as his running mate and went on to win in a landslide victory over Republican Barry Goldwater. As vice president, Humphrey oversaw turbulent times in America, including race riots and growing frustration and anger over the large number of casualties in the Vietnam War. President Johnson's popularity plummeted as the election grew closer.

== Lyndon B. Johnson campaign ==
Prior to Humphrey's run, President Lyndon B. Johnson began a campaign for re-election, placing his name in the first-in-the-nation New Hampshire primary. Late in 1967, building upon anti-war sentiment, Senator Eugene McCarthy of Minnesota entered the race with heavy criticism of the President's Vietnam War policies. Even before McCarthy's entrance, Johnson grew concerned about a primary challenge. He confided to Democratic Congressional leaders that an opponent could draw the support of Martin Luther King Jr. and Dr. Benjamin Spock, defeating him in New Hampshire, and forcing his withdrawal from the race; similar to Senator Estes Kefauver's 1952 challenge to President Harry S. Truman, which preceded Truman's decision not to seek re-election.

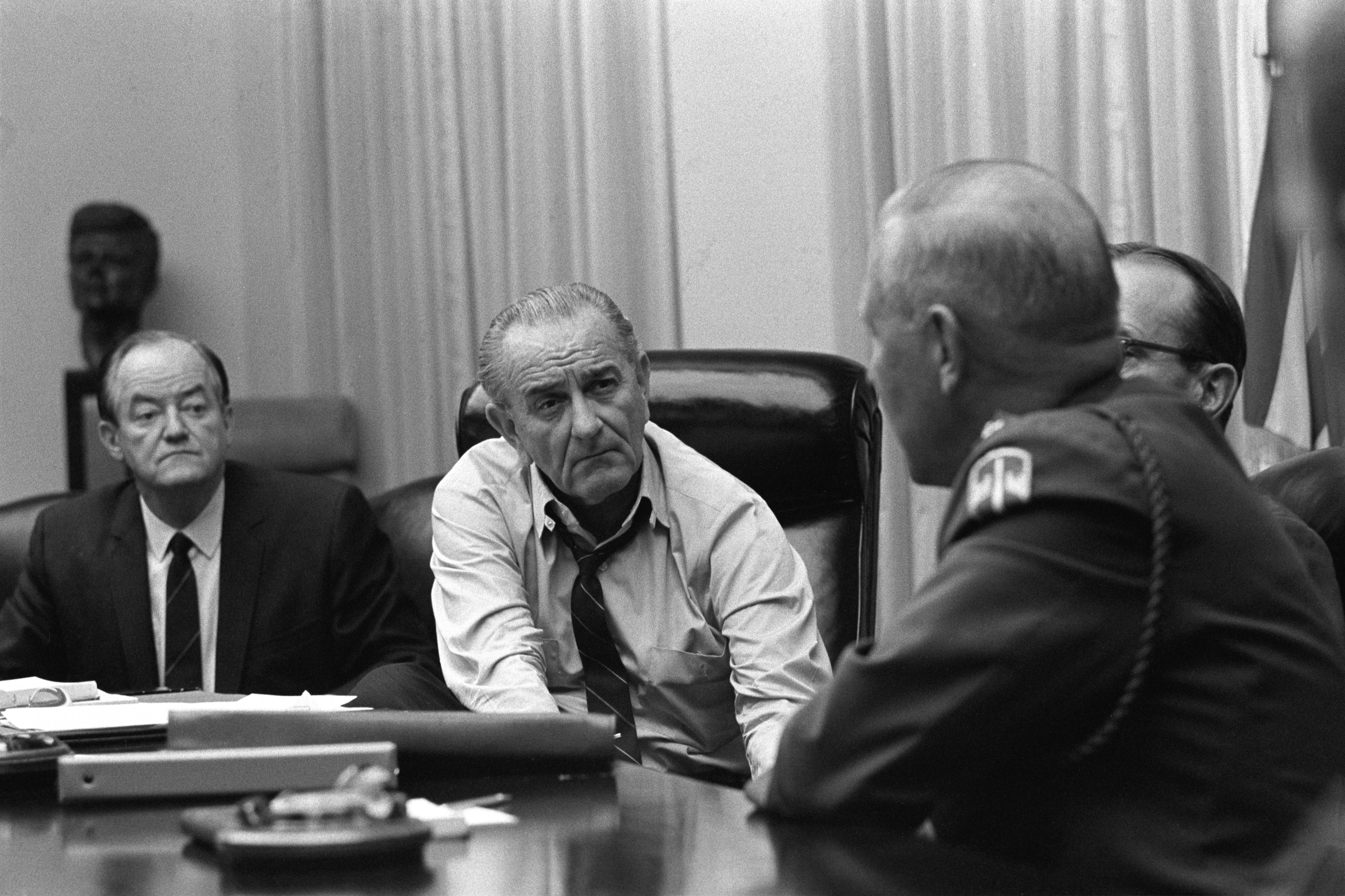
Humphrey (left) and President Lyndon Johnson (center) discuss the Vietnam War.

Johnson assigned Humphrey the task of campaigning for re-election. In this role, the Associated Press described him as the "administration's strongest advocate on Vietnam" policy. That task proved difficult following the Tet Offensive, which despite being a tactical victory, resulted in the deaths of thousands of American and South Vietnamese soldiers. The offensive included an invasion of the United States Embassy in Saigon, which changed the American public perception of North Vietnamese strength and the projected length of the war. Most Americans favored either an escalation in the number of American troops in Vietnam to overwhelm the enemy or a total withdrawal of American troops to prevent expending additional resources on the "hopeless task". McCarthy decried Johnson's handling of the war. He regarded "the Administration's reports of progress [as] the products of their own self-deception". The Johnson campaign tried to negate the war's detractors before the New Hampshire primary. They circulated literature, warning voters "the communists in Vietnam are watching ... don't vote for fuzzy thinking and surrender". Despite opinion polls showing McCarthy's support around 10 to 20 percent in the state, in the primary itself McCarthy received 42.2 percent of the total vote, slightly below Johnson's 49.4 percent. Observers hailed the outcome as a "moral victory" for McCarthy. Senator Robert Kennedy of New York cited it as an inspiration to enter the race himself, despite previously announcing he would not challenge Johnson for the nomination. Humphrey tried to encourage the President to be more involved in the campaign, but he appeared disinterested. He delayed meetings with Indiana Governor Roger Branigin to arrange a favorite son "stand in" for the campaign; and despite Humphrey's insistence, Johnson neglected to hire the campaign's 1964 campaign manager Larry O'Brien. Humphrey did convince Johnson to speak to the influential National Farmers Union in Minneapolis, ahead of the Wisconsin Primary.

In late March, opinion polls suggested McCarthy would likely win the Wisconsin Primary. With defeat looming, Johnson decided to drop out of the race. When he informed Humphrey of his decision, Humphrey urged Johnson to reconsider. Johnson argued it betrayed the best interests of the nation to mix the partisan politics of a presidential election with the ongoing Vietnam crisis. Furthermore, Johnson said that if elected, he probably would not be able to complete the term since the men in his family usually died in their early sixties. A week prior to the primary, on March 31, the President publicly announced he would not seek or accept the Democratic Party nomination, thus setting the stage for Humphrey's presidential run.

== Announcement ==
Democrats United for Humphrey

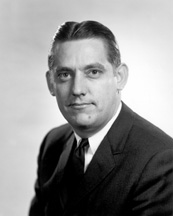
Fred R. Harris

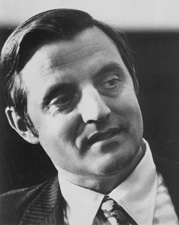
Walter Mondale

After Johnson's withdrawal, Humphrey was hit with a barrage of media interest and fanfare. His aides Max Kampelman and Bill Connell began to set up an organization and held meetings with Humphrey and his advisors, encouraging him to start a campaign. Humphrey set up offices for preparation, and unsuccessfully courted Larry O'Brien as campaign manager. O'Brien explained that his loyalties lay with the Kennedy family, leaving Humphrey undecided on whom to hire. Connell added lawyer and former DNC Treasurer Richard Maguire, who established the temporary campaign headquarters at his law firm. Eventually, Humphrey decided to embrace the youth of politics, adding Senators Fred R. Harris and Walter Mondale, who agreed to lead the Democrats United for Humphrey organization. Harris was put in charge of winning delegates, and Mondale prepared for the convention, helping to keep an organization in place. Kampelman, Connell and McGuire questioned Humphrey's decision to hire the Senators, explaining that they had no organizational experience. Humphrey worried about his organization in the state of Iowa, but Harris and Mondale assured him that what would be lost in the state would be made up in Maryland. The campaign believed they could build a coalition of southern and border state Democrats as well as Union and Civil rights leaders to win the nomination. Mondale and Harris also desired to add a few anti-war liberals to the coalition. Meanwhile, Humphrey's office constantly received calls urging him to announce. Congressman Hale Boggs and Senator Russell Long, both of Louisiana, warned Humphrey that if he did not declare his candidacy soon, Kennedy would secure the nomination. Labor leader George Meany also called for Humphrey to announce immediately, but when Humphrey explained that he did not want to rush into a campaign, Meany called President Johnson to demand that Humphrey announce. Johnson refused, and never explicitly asked Humphrey to run. Governors Harold Hughes of Iowa and Philip H. Hoff of Vermont, each advised Humphrey to resign as vice president to separate himself from Johnson, but he declined. Before the official announcement, Humphrey met with Johnson and discussed the future. The President advised Humphrey that his biggest obstacle as a candidate would be money and organization, and that he must focus on the Midwest and Rust Belt states in order to win.

After weeks of speculation, Humphrey finally announced his candidacy on April 27, 1968, in front of a crowd of 1,700 supporters in Washington D.C. chanting "We Want Hubert". He delivered a twenty-minute speech, broadcast throughout the nation on television and radio that had been in preparation for four days after Johnson's withdrawal. Labor Secretary W. Willard Wirtz, White House staffers Harry McPherson and Charles Murphy, and journalists Norman Cousins and Bill Moyers all contributed to the speech. In the speech, Humphrey proclaimed that the election would be about "common sense, and a time for maturity, strength and responsibility". He set his goals at not simply winning the nomination but winning in a way that would "unite [the] party" so he could then "unite and govern [the] nation". He argued that his campaign was "the way politics ought to be ... the politics of happiness, the politics of purpose, the politics of joy." His entrance occurred too late in the process to qualify for ballot access in the primaries.

== Campaign developments ==
As the campaign got underway, Humphrey tried to position himself as the conservative Democrat in the race, hoping to appeal to Southern delegates. Republicans, feeling that the Vice President might be the nominee, began to attack him, describing his positions as socialistic and reminding voters that Southern Democrats once considered him a "wild-eyed liberal". Democrats conceded this point but argued that compared to McCarthy and Kennedy, Humphrey was conservative. He immediately made an impact on the polls, rocketing to number one among Democrats in the beginning of May with 38%, ahead of both McCarthy and Kennedy. An internal struggle within the campaign between the new politics of Mondale and Harris, and the old politics of Connell, Kampelman and Maguire, sometimes disrupted the organization of staffers in different states. Humphrey ordered Connell to not circumvent Mondale and Harris on campaign decisions, but the clashing continued throughout the campaign. The older faction referred to Mondale and Harris as "boy scouts".

Endorsements
- Comedian Steve Allen
- Actress Tallulah Bankhead
- United States Ambassador to the United Nations George W. Ball
- Actor Bill Dana
- Boxer Jack Dempsey
- Comedian Victor Borge
- Writer Ralph Ellison
- Novelist James T. Farrell
- Former Supreme Court Justice Arthur J. Goldberg
- Impresario Sol Hurok
- Pianist Eugene Istomin
- Actor George Jessel
- President Lyndon B. Johnson
- Architect Philip Johnson
- Comedian Alan King
- Dramatist Sidney Kingsley
- Writer Joseph Wood Krutch
- Actress Carmen De Lavallade
- Actor E. G. Marshall
- Baritone Robert Merrill
- Actor Paul Newman
- Singer Roberta Peters
- Fashion Designer Mollie Parnis
- Singer Frank Sinatra
- Singer Nancy Sinatra
- Writer John Steinbeck
- Violinist Isaac Stern
- Ballerina Maria Tallchief
- Philadelphia Mayor James Tate
- Singer Sarah Vaughan
- Author Herman Wouk

Favorite sons

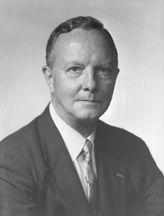
Stephen Young

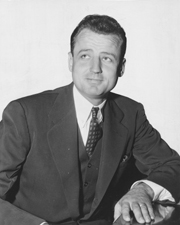
George Smathers

At the Indiana primary, Humphrey began the strategy of using "favorite son" candidates as surrogates for his campaign, and to weaken his opponents. Governor Roger Branigin stood in for Humphrey in Indiana, and placed second, in front of McCarthy but below Kennedy. Senator Stephen M. Young of Ohio stood in for the Vice President in Ohio, and won the primary. He won his largest share of delegates during a six-week period after May 10, when the Vietnam War was briefly removed as a campaign issue due to the delicate peace talks with Hanoi. Later in May, he gained 57 delegates from Florida, as favorite son candidate Senator George Smathers defeated McCarthy in the Florida primary with 46% of the vote. Humphrey also picked up delegates from Pennsylvania, following an endorsement from Philadelphia Mayor James Tate, and collected delegates from leaders in New York, Minnesota, Montana, Utah, Delaware and Connecticut. The other candidates criticized this tactic, and accused Humphrey of organizing a "bossed convention" against the wishes of the people.

Frank Sinatra performed at a fundraising rally for Humphrey's campaign at the Oakland Arena on 22 May.

The next month, Humphrey's rival Robert F. Kennedy was assassinated in Los Angeles, prompting the Vice President to return to his home in Minnesota and "think about the next stage". Shaken by the event, Humphrey took off two weeks from campaigning. He met with President Johnson, and the two talked about "everything" during a three-hour meeting. The assassination all but guaranteed Humphrey the nomination. He commented that he "was doing everything I could to win the nomination ... but God knows I didn't want it that way." A large number of Kennedy delegates switched to Humphrey, but he lost money from Republican donors concerned about a Kennedy nomination, and popular opinion polls shifted in favor of Senator McCarthy. In fact, Humphrey was booed before 50,000 people on June 19 at the Lincoln Memorial as he was introduced at a Solidarity March for civil rights. Drew Pearson and Jack Anderson described the response as ironic, given that Humphrey was booed at the 1948 Democratic National Convention after advocating a civil rights plank. He tried to defend his record against the liberal detractors, but often encountered anti-war protesters and hostile crowds while campaigning. At the end of June, Republican Senator Mark Hatfield of Oregon assessed the race, arguing that Humphrey would be the party's nominee for president but criticized him for being too closely aligned with Johnson's policies. Humphrey asked for Johnson's permission to deviate from the administration's position on the war for a plan that included a bombing halt and drawback of forces, but Johnson refused, explaining that it would disrupt the peace process and endanger American soldiers. He relayed to Humphrey that the blood of his son-in-law who was serving in Vietnam, would be on his hands if he announced the new position.

In July, Humphrey criticized McCarthy for simply complaining about the war effort and offering no plan for peace. Afterwards, McCarthy challenged Humphrey to a series of debates on an assortment of issues including Vietnam. The Vice President accepted the invitation but modified the proposal, requesting there be only one debate prior to the Democratic National Convention. However, the one-on-one debate never occurred, largely due to the Eastern Bloc invasion of Czechoslovakia, and the insistence of other candidates to participate. At the end of the month, Humphrey began to court Senator Edward Kennedy of Massachusetts, the younger brother of Robert Kennedy, as a possible running mate, hoping the Senator would increase his chances of winning the support of liberals, and alleviate the criticism spawned from his connections to Johnson. Kennedy declined. Humphrey also asked Larry O'Brien, who had been named as chairman of the Democratic National Committee, to be his campaign manager. O'Brien privately believed that Humphrey could not win in the general election, but joined because he felt "sympathy for Humphrey and the problems he faced". He publicly predicted the race would come "down to the wire".

As former Vice President Richard Nixon gained the Republican Party nomination, Humphrey held what he thought was a private meeting with 23 college students in his office. There, he candidly discussed his thoughts about the political climate, unaware that reporters were also in the room and that his statements would become public. Humphrey remarked that youths were using the Vietnam War as "escapism" and ignoring domestic issues. He stated that he had received thousands of letters from young people about the Vietnam War but received zero about Head Start as part of the program designed for poor preschool children began to expire, which he saved with a tie-breaking Senate vote. As the national convention approached with Humphrey's likely nomination, the war continued to divide the party and set the stage for a battle in Chicago, Humphrey hoped to move the convention to Miami. At first a cover story for relocation was an unsettled communications workers strike. The truth was to escape a vitriolic venue. President Johnson vetoed the idea.

== Democratic National Convention ==
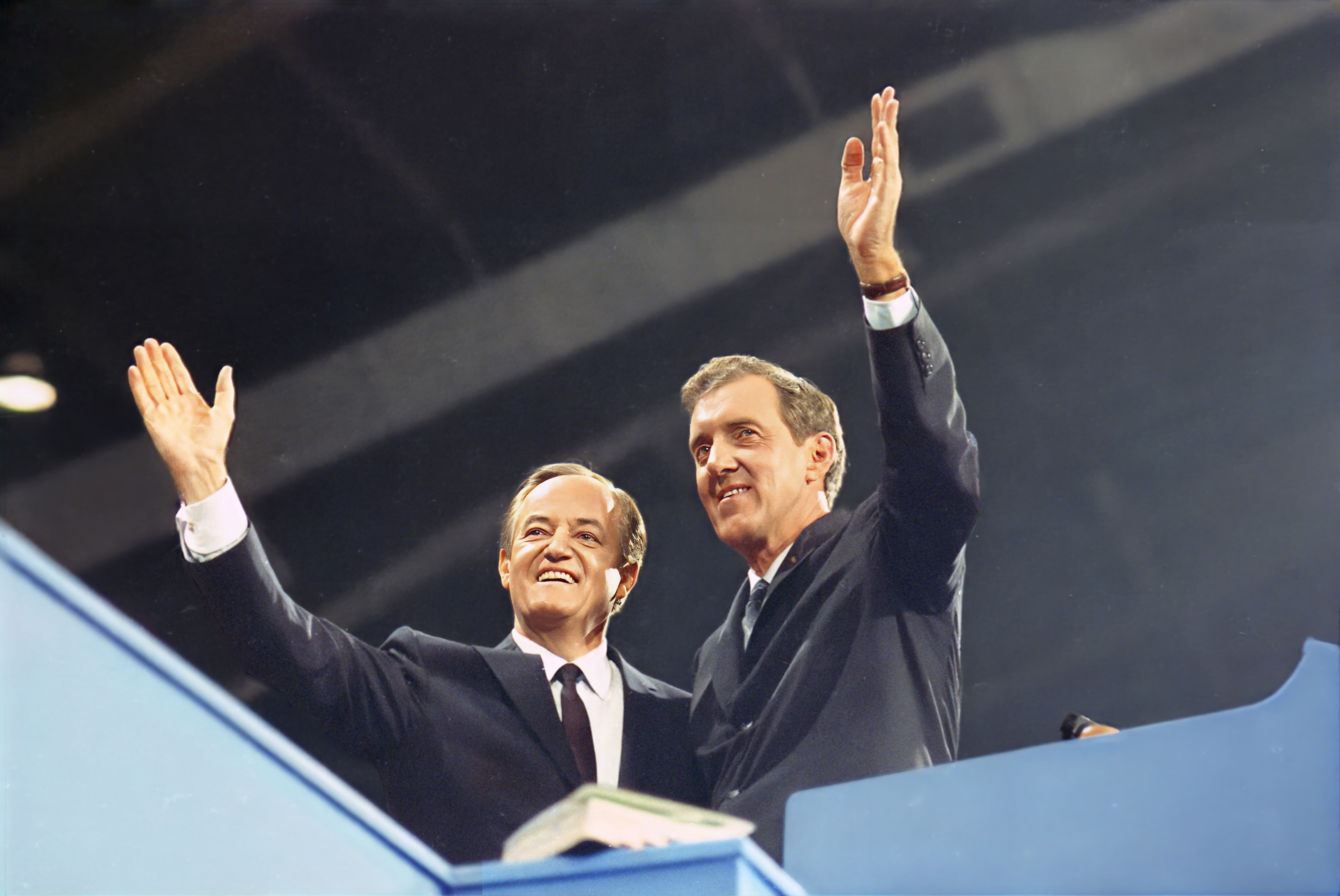
Humphrey and Muskie together at the Democratic National Convention

On August 10, just two weeks prior to the convention opening, South Dakota Senator George McGovern entered the race, casting himself as the standard-bearer of the Robert Kennedy legacy. As the 1968 Democratic National Convention started, Humphrey stated that he had more than enough delegates to secure the nomination, but commentators questioned the campaign's ability to hold on to the delegates. The Texas delegation announced frustration at the McCarthy campaign's attempts to change procedures, and declared that they might renominate President Johnson as a result. Observers noted that Humphrey's delegates were supporters of Johnson, and could follow suit. Meanwhile, protests and sleep-ins were held in the streets and parks of Chicago, forcing Mayor Richard J. Daley to order federal troops into the city. Eventually, 6,000 federal troops and 18,000 Illinois National Guardsmen were outside the convention, defending the premises. A televised debate was held featuring Humphrey, McCarthy and McGovern. Humphrey hoped to unite the party during the debate, affirming his support for peace in Vietnam, but his challengers were received better by the crowd, drawing more applause.

Humphrey won the party's nomination on the first ballot after a two-hour debate among delegates the next day, defeating McCarthy 1759.25 to 601. McGovern finished in third with 146.5, and gave a lukewarm endorsement of Humphrey, asking him to be "his own man". McCarthy refused to make an endorsement, although he privately confided to Humphrey that his supporters would not understand if he immediately showed his support. Humphrey also narrowly won the party plank in support of the Vietnam War, although his officials pleaded with Johnson to accept a compromise with the doves, which he refused. The results caused the protests to intensify, prompting the use of tear gas, which Humphrey could smell in his hotel room. He also received six death threats. The tactics used to quell the protests were criticized by certain Democrats as being excessive. During his acceptance speech, Humphrey tried to unify the party, stating "the policies of tomorrow need not be limited to the policies of yesterday." He asked former Republican candidate Nelson Rockefeller to be his running mate, but he declined. Several other names were mentioned to Humphrey during the convention. Texas Governor John Connally was suggested by a delegation of southern Democratic governors, but the Governor himself suggested former Deputy Secretary of Defense Cyrus Vance. O'Brien and Fred Harris appeared to suggest themselves for the position, and adviser Connell also suggested Harris, although Max Kampelman favored former Peace Corps director Sargent Shriver. Humphrey instead decided on senator and former governor Edmund Muskie of Maine, who had been his preferred choice. Observers noted the selection of the Senator, active in civil rights and labor and on neither side of the war issue, was a move to appeal to liberals while not upsetting establishment Democrats. Republican nominee Richard Nixon congratulated Humphrey on his victory as the general election campaign began.

== General election ==
As the general election got underway, the largest hurdle for the campaign was finances. Polling numbers showed Humphrey trailing Nixon, causing donations to decrease. President Johnson refused to use the power of his office to help raise money, although many speculated that the tardiness of the convention, scheduled to coincide with Johnson's birthday, contributed to the issue. To stay afloat, several loans were made, which eventually accounted for half of the $11.6 million used by Humphrey throughout the general election. Campaign workers decided that no money would be spent on radio or television advertising until the final three weeks of the election. In September, President Johnson showed his support for Humphrey by giving what was described as the strongest endorsement of the campaign when he asked Texas Democrats to throw their support behind the Vice President. However, Johnson did not give his official endorsement until an October 10 radio address. Meanwhile, Humphrey campaigned in New York where he labeled Nixon a "Hawk", stating that the former Vice President "wanted to go to war (in Vietnam) in 1954". At a later stop in Buffalo, Humphrey was met by protesters.

Both campaigns began to use their running mates to attack the other candidate. Republican vice presidential nominee Spiro Agnew criticized the current Vice President for being "soft on communism" and "soft on inflation and soft on law and order". He then compared the nominee to former British Prime Minister Neville Chamberlain. But Agnew often made gaffes on the campaign trail, in contrast to Muskie who was viewed as a natural campaigner. In Missouri, in preparation for a meeting with former President Harry Truman, Muskie tried to defend his running mate from connections made by the Nixon campaign to the Johnson administration. He reversed the accusation by claiming that Nixon should be held accountable for the shortcomings of the Eisenhower administration, under his logic. He then lambasted the Republican ticket for ignoring such issues as urban renewal, housing, and federal aid for education and sewage. Muskie was renowned for his speaking ability, and was known to turn around hostile crowds including one well publicized event when he asked an anti-war protester to join him on the stage. Although he provided a small boost for the campaign, Nixon remained fifteen points ahead, 44% to 29% in the September 27 Gallup poll. Diplomat George W. Ball soon resigned his position in the Johnson administration to campaign for and advise Humphrey, hoping to prevent a Nixon victory. At the end of September, Humphrey's chances for the presidency further declined as media outlets observed that the Republican Party would be the likely winners in the election. Humphrey acknowledged his odds, proclaiming at an event in Boston: "regardless of the outcome of this election, I want it to be said of Hubert Humphrey that at an important and tough moment of his life he stood up for what he believed and was not shouted down." The comment drew boos from the crowd. Individuals close to the campaign noted that Humphrey looked tired and worn-out while flying from stop to stop, but would brighten up when he encountered a crowd.

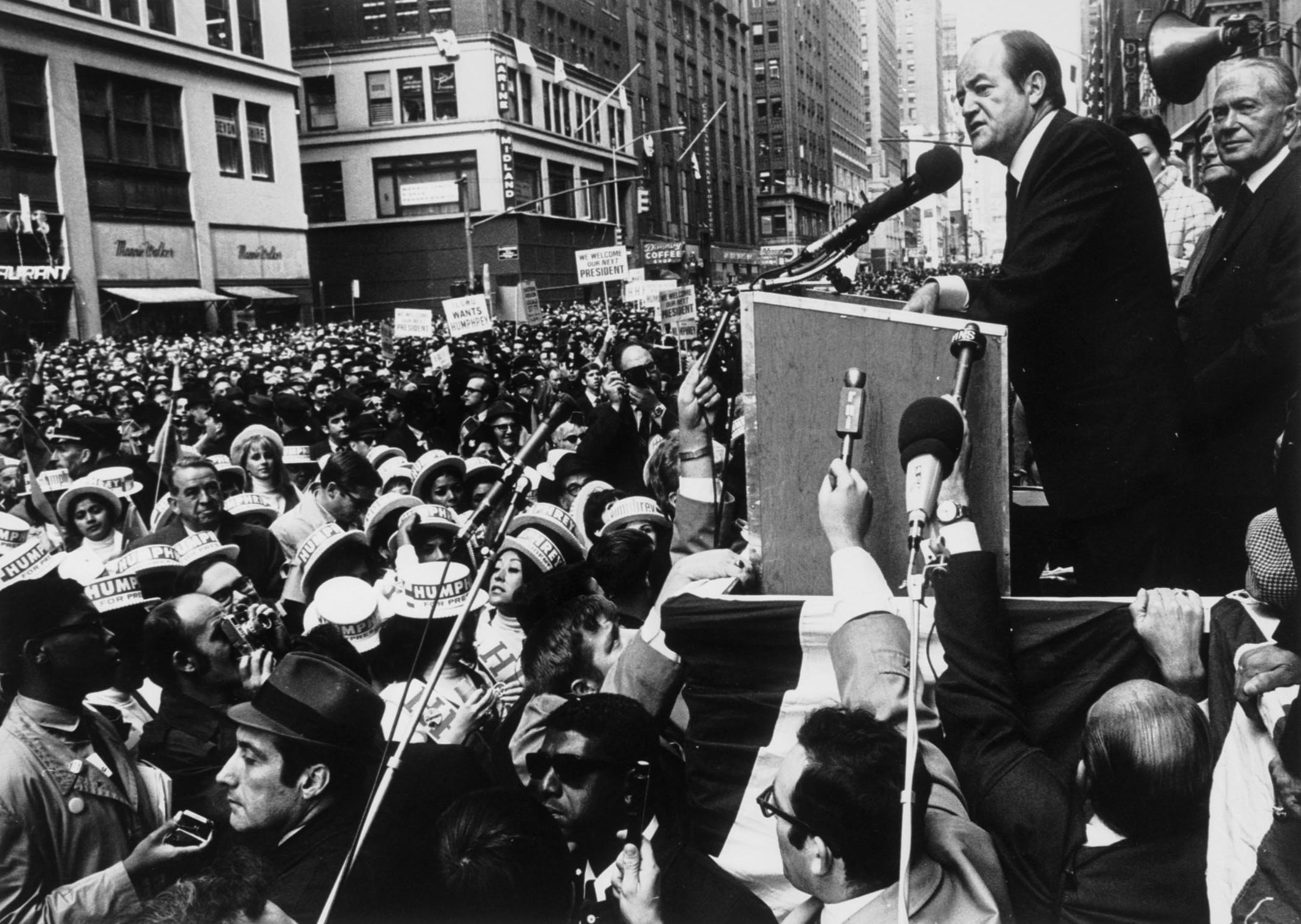
Humphrey delivers a speech during a campaign rally.

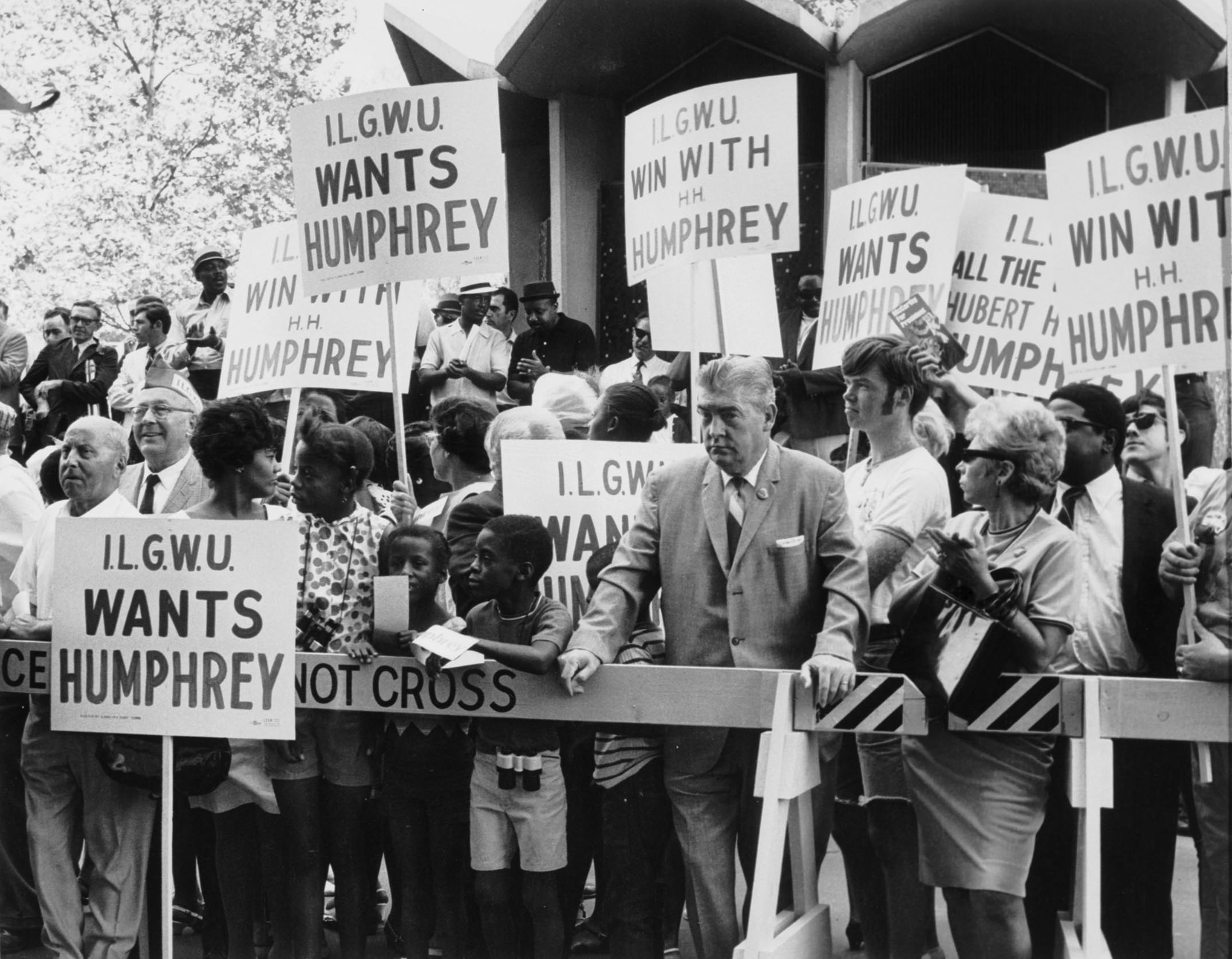
International Ladies' Garment Workers' Union supporters hold signs during a Humphrey rally.

On September 30, hoping to separate himself from the policies of the Johnson administration at the advice of O'Brien who noted that he needed the anti-war vote to win in New York and California, Humphrey delivered a televised speech in Salt Lake City to a nationwide audience, and announced that if he was elected, he would put an end to the bombing of North Vietnam, and called for a ceasefire. He labeled the new policy "as an acceptable risk for peace". The plan was compared to Nixon's, which the candidate stated would not be revealed until Inauguration Day. After the speech, anti-war protesters stopped shadowing Humphrey's appearances, and a few McCarthy supporters joined the campaign. Donations totaling $300,000 were immediately made to Humphrey, and he also improved in the polls, cutting Nixon's lead to single digits by mid-October. Meanwhile, Nixon tried to shift the emphasis of the campaign to the issue of law and order, and declared that a vote for Humphrey, would amount to "a vote to continue a lackadaisical, do nothing attitude toward the crime crisis in America". While campaigning in San Antonio, Humphrey went on the attack against Nixon. He accused the Republican nominee of playing politics with human rights, and claimed that he was "on the road to defeat". Hoping to gain favor among the Hispanic community, Humphrey alleged that Nixon had never discussed the concerns of Hispanic-Americans during the course of the campaign. Nixon continued to tie Humphrey to Johnson. He argued that the administration was playing politics with the Vietnam War by trying to complete a treaty before the election to favor the Vice President. Humphrey fired back at Nixon's allegations, stating that the former vice president was using "the old Nixon tactic of unsubstantiated insinuation" and requested that he show evidence for his claims. Humphrey challenged Nixon to a series of presidential debates, but the Republican nominee declined, largely due to his uncomfortable experience at the 1960 presidential debates, and to deny recognition to the populist American Independent Party candidate, Governor George Wallace of Alabama, who would have been included at the event. Both the Humphrey and Nixon campaigns were concerned that Wallace would take a sizable number of states in the electoral college and force the House of Representatives to decide the election. Although Wallace had focused most of his campaign on the south, he was drawing large crowds during appearances in the north. Both campaigns delegated a large amount of resources to denounce Wallace as a "frustrated segregationist". As election day neared, Wallace fell in the polls, greatly diminishing the chance that he would influence the result.

A few days before the election, Humphrey gained the endorsement of his former rival Eugene McCarthy. During a stop in Pittsburgh, Humphrey stated that the endorsement made him a "happy man". The hopes of victory for Humphrey also began to look up as a bombing pause was achieved and that negotiations had progressed, cutting Nixon's 18 point lead to 2 points at the end of October. The Soviet Union had tried to influence the North Vietnamese to soften on the negotiations to prevent a Nixon victory, but Nixon publicly accused President Johnson of speeding up the negotiations. Contemporary sources reveal that Nixon was personally involved in preventing the South Vietnamese from coming to the negotiation table, through the use of operative Anna Chennault who advised Saigon that a Nixon administration would offer them a better deal.

Humphrey's final campaign event at the Houston Astrodome

Members of the campaign later claimed that Humphrey did not bring this up before the election, because he did not want to appear desperate while polls placed him even with Nixon. Humphrey held his final campaign rally at the Houston Astrodome on November 3 alongside President Johnson. Governor Connally did not attend the event, causing suspicion that he would back Nixon, but he later assured Humphrey that he would not do so. During his speech at the rally, Humphrey asked Americans to base their vote on hope rather than fear. The next day, the eve of the election, he appeared in Los Angeles with Muskie, and was greeted by 100,000 supporters. Later that day, Humphrey and Nixon each held four-hour televised forums from Los Angeles on rival television networks. Humphrey's on ABC-TV at 8:30pm EST, Nixon's on NBC-TV at 9pm EST. Humphrey, with Muskie by his side, fielded questions from a live studio audience and a phone bank of celebrities including Frank Sinatra and Paul Newman. The Nixon telecast featured no interaction with anyone other than sports personally Bud Wilkinson who read queries from index cards beside rows of volunteers taking calls. Muskie, commenting on the Republican broadcast from their studios noted that Spiro Agnew was nowhere to be found and how it appeared to be staged. Nixon tried to reverse Humphrey's boost from the bombing halt by stating that he had been advised that "tons of supplies" were being sent along the Ho Chi Minh Trail by the North Vietnamese, a shipment that could not be stopped. Humphrey described these claims as "irresponsible", which prompted Nixon to proclaim that Humphrey "doesn't know what's going on". McCarthy called in during Humphrey's telethon and affirmed his support for the ticket. Edward Kennedy videotaped an endorsement for Humphrey from his home in Massachusetts.

== Results ==
Electoral college results of the general election, November 5, 1968

On Election Day, Humphrey was defeated by Nixon 301 to 191 in the electoral college. Wallace received 46, all in the Deep South. The popular vote was much closer as Nixon edged Humphrey 43.42% to 42.72%, with a margin of approximately 500,000 votes. Humphrey carried his home state of Minnesota and Texas, the home state of President Johnson (as well as Maine, running-mate Ed Muskie's home state). He also won most of the Northeast and Michigan, but lost the West to Nixon and the South to Wallace. Humphrey conceded the race to Nixon, and stated that he would support him as president. On his way out he remarked: "I've done my best."

Post election polls showed that Humphrey lost the white vote with 38%, nine points behind Nixon, but won the nonwhite vote solidly, 85% to 12%, including 85% of African-Americans. African-Americans favored Humphrey because of his record on civil rights, and their desire to quickly end the war in Vietnam, where blacks were overrepresented. The racial divide in the election had widened since 1964, and was attributed to civil rights protests and race riots. Humphrey won 45% of the female vote, two points ahead of Nixon, but lost to the Republican among males, 41% to 43%. Voters with only a grade school education supported Humphrey 52% to 33% over Nixon, while Nixon won among both those with no higher education than high school (43% to 42%) and those who graduated from college (54% to 37%). Occupation demographics mirrored these numbers with manual-labor workers supporting Humphrey 50% to 37%, and with white-collar (47% to 41%) and professionals (56% to 34%) favoring Nixon. Humphrey won among young voters (under 30 years old) by 47% to 38%, and also edged Nixon among those between 30 and 49 years, with 44% to 41%. Nixon won among voters over 50 years, 47% to 41%. Catholics backed Humphrey with 59%, twelve points ahead of Nixon, but Protestants favored Nixon, 49% to 35%. Humphrey lost the Independent vote 31% to 44%, with 25% going to Wallace, and won a lower percentage among Democrats (74%) than Nixon won among Republicans (86%). This discrepancy was connected to the tough Democratic primary election that caused some former McCarthy, Kennedy or McGovern supporters to vote for Nixon or Wallace as a protest.

== Aftermath ==
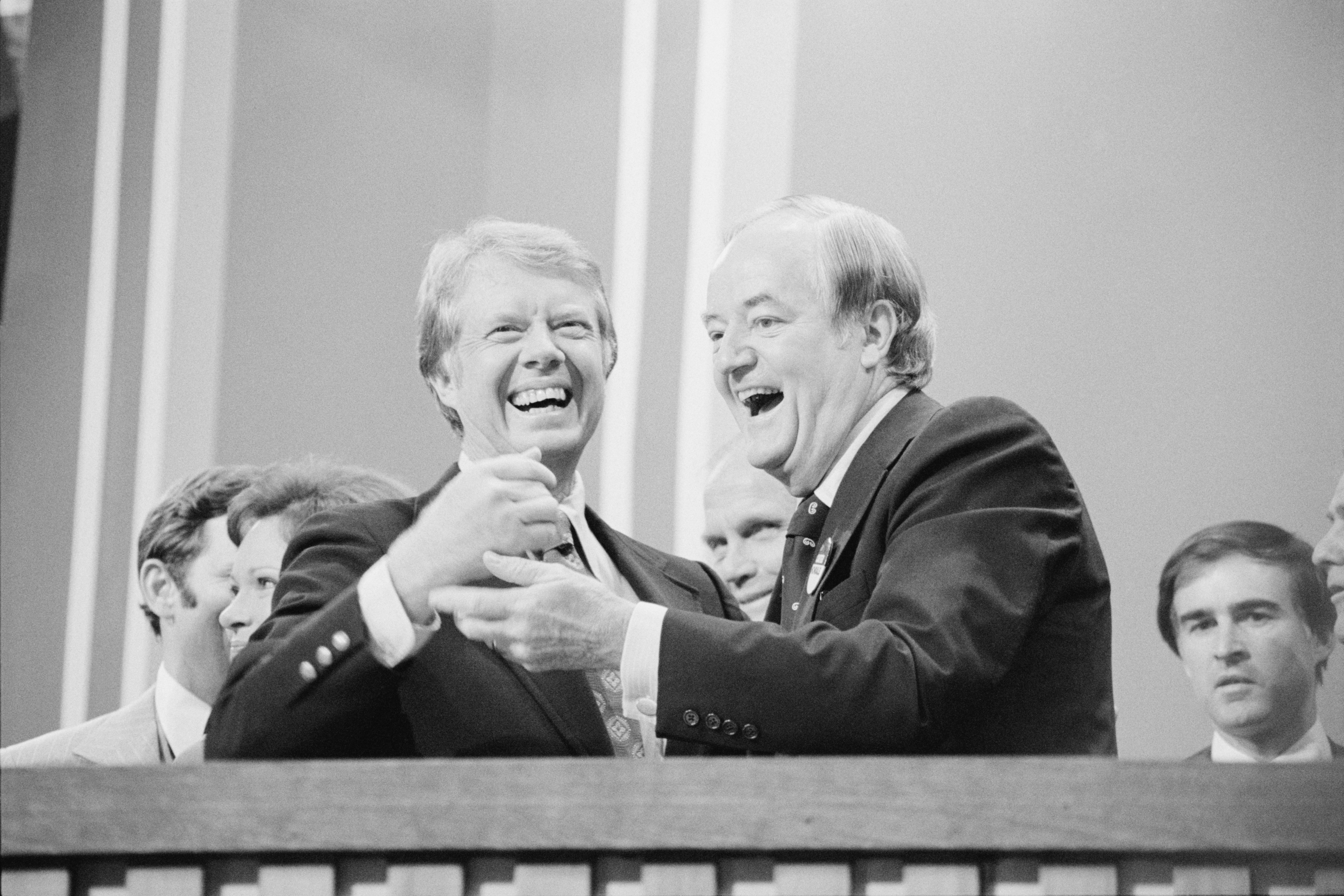
Humphrey with Jimmy Carter in 1976

After the defeat, Humphrey suffered from depression. To stay active, his friends helped him get hired as a professor at Macalester College and the University of Minnesota. He also wrote a syndicated column and was added to the board of directors for the Encyclopædia Britannica. Augmented by paid speaking tours, he earned $200,000 in his first year of private life, the most he ever earned in a single year. He also remained loyal to the Democratic Party, and often attended party fundraising events. In 1970, Humphrey returned to politics and ran for the Senate seat vacated by Eugene McCarthy. During the campaign, he appeared refreshed. He had lost a dozen pounds and darkened his hair in preparation for the race, hoping to appear youthful. Humphrey easily won the election, and began his new term in 1971. He ran again for the Democratic presidential nomination in 1972, and won the most votes during the primary campaign, but lost to George McGovern at the convention. McGovern went on to be defeated by President Nixon in a landslide. Humphrey was mentioned as a potential candidate for the 1976 presidential nomination, and an early poll placed him as the leading candidate by more than ten points. Draft efforts were organized to convince him to run, and although he did not formally announce his candidacy, he affirmed that if nominated, he would accept. Georgia Governor Jimmy Carter was nominated instead, and defeated Republican nominee Gerald Ford. Carter ran with Walter Mondale and would later name Edmund Muskie as Secretary of State. After being diagnosed with bladder cancer, Humphrey died on January 13, 1978, while still serving in the Senate. He called Richard Nixon prior to his death, and invited him to attend his funeral.

== See also ==
- 1968 Democratic Party presidential primaries
- 1968 Democratic Party vice presidential candidate selection
- 1968 Democratic National Convention
- 1968 United States presidential election
- Richard Nixon 1968 presidential campaign

== Bibliography ==
- Atkins, Annette (2007), Creating Minnesota: A History from the Inside Out, St. Paul, Minnesota: Minnesota Historical Society Press, ISBN 978-0-87351-596-2
- Humphrey, Hubert (1976), The Education of a Public Man, Minneapolis, Minnesota: University of Minnesota Press, ISBN 978-0-8166-1897-2
- Kalb, Marvin L. (1994), The Nixon memo: political respectability, Russia, and the press, University of Chicago Press, ISBN 978-0-226-42299-2
- Oberdorfer, Don (March 2001), Tet!: the turning point in the Vietnam War, JHU Press, ISBN 978-0-8018-6703-3
- Richardson, Darcy G. (2002), A Nation Divided, Lincoln, Nebraska: Writer's Club Press, ISBN 978-0-595-23699-2
- Solberg, Carl (1984), Hubert Humphrey: A Biography, New York: W.W. Norton & Company, ISBN 978-0-87351-473-6
- Van Dyk, Ted (November 1, 2007), Heroes, hacks, and fools: memoirs from the political inside, University of Washington Press, ISBN 978-0-295-98751-4
