= Hubert Humphrey presidential campaign =

Hubert Humphrey unsuccessfully ran for president thrice:

- Hubert Humphrey presidential campaign, 1952, the failed campaign Hubert Humphrey conducted in 1952
- Hubert Humphrey presidential campaign, 1960, the failed campaign Hubert Humphrey conducted in 1960
- Hubert Humphrey presidential campaign, 1968
- Hubert Humphrey presidential campaign, 1972
