= Ramsayville, Ontario =

Coordinates: 45.368°N 75.565°W

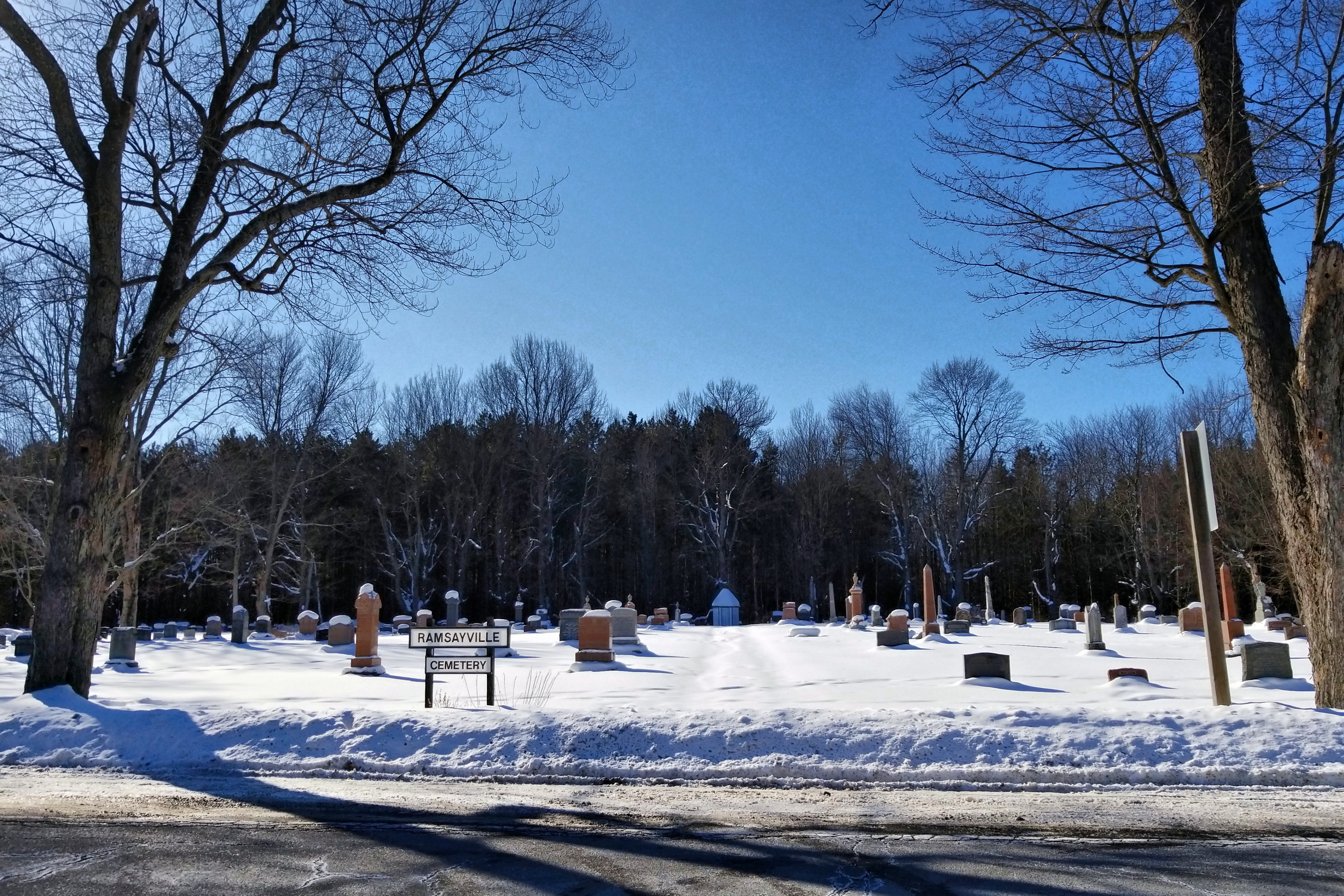
Ramsayville cemetery

Location of Ramsayville in Ontario

Ramsayville is a rural community on Ramsay Creek in Gloucester-Southgate Ward in Ottawa, Ontario, Canada. Prior to 2001, the community was located within the City of Gloucester.

The immediate area around Ramsayville (North by the eastern prolongation of Hunt Club Road and Highway 417, west by Hawthorne Road, south by Leitrim Road and east by Anderson Road) has a population of about 90 (2011 Census)

The community was also a site used for High Frequency Direction Finding experiments by the Royal Canadian Navy. The Navy installation was located on Ramsayville Road (then known as Base Line Road) about five miles from Gloucester near the intersection of Leitrim Road. It was not that far away from CFS Leitrim. Although not a Naval Radio Station, the installation's experiments that were conducted at its height were likely classified. The station was still known to be in operation as of 1965.

Ramsayville was the site of an aircraft crash in 1950 that claimed the life of Laurence Steinhardt, then US Ambassador to Canada.

== Transportation ==
The main roads servicing the area are Ramsayville Road and Ontario Highway 417.
