= Reyna Walters-Morgan =

American attorney

Vice Chair of the Democratic National Committee
- Incumbent
- Assumed office February 1, 2025 Serving with Artie Blanco and Jane Kleeb
- Chair: Ken Martin
- Preceded by: Various

Personal details
- Born: Brooklyn, New York
- Party: Democratic
- Education: University of North Carolina at Chapel Hill (BA); Howard University (JD)

Reyna Walters-Morgan is an American attorney and Democratic political activist, currently serving as the Vice Chair for Civic Engagement and Voter Participation for the Democratic National Committee. She has previously served as the Director of Civic Engagement and Voter Protection for the Democratic National Committee. Previously, she was a regional voter protection director for Hillary Clinton's 2016 presidential campaign and an attorney at her law firm, Walters-Morgan Law PLLC.

On December 27, 2024, Walters-Morgan announced her intention to run for election to the Vice Chair of Civic Engagement and Voter Participation role of the Democratic National Committee. On Saturday, February 1, 2025, Walters-Morgan was elected on the third ballot with 210 out of 409 total votes at the DNC's Winter Meeting in National Harbor, Maryland.

== Early life and education ==
Walters-Morgan was born in Brooklyn and raised in North Carolina. She received her B.A. from UNC-Chapel Hill, and her Juris Doctor degree from Howard University School of Law. She is a member of Alpha Kappa Alpha sorority.

Party political offices
| Preceded by Keisha Lance Bottoms | Vice Chair For Civic Engagement And Voter Participation of the Democratic National Committee; 2025–present | Incumbent |
