= Laurence Steinhardt =

American diplomat (1892–1950)

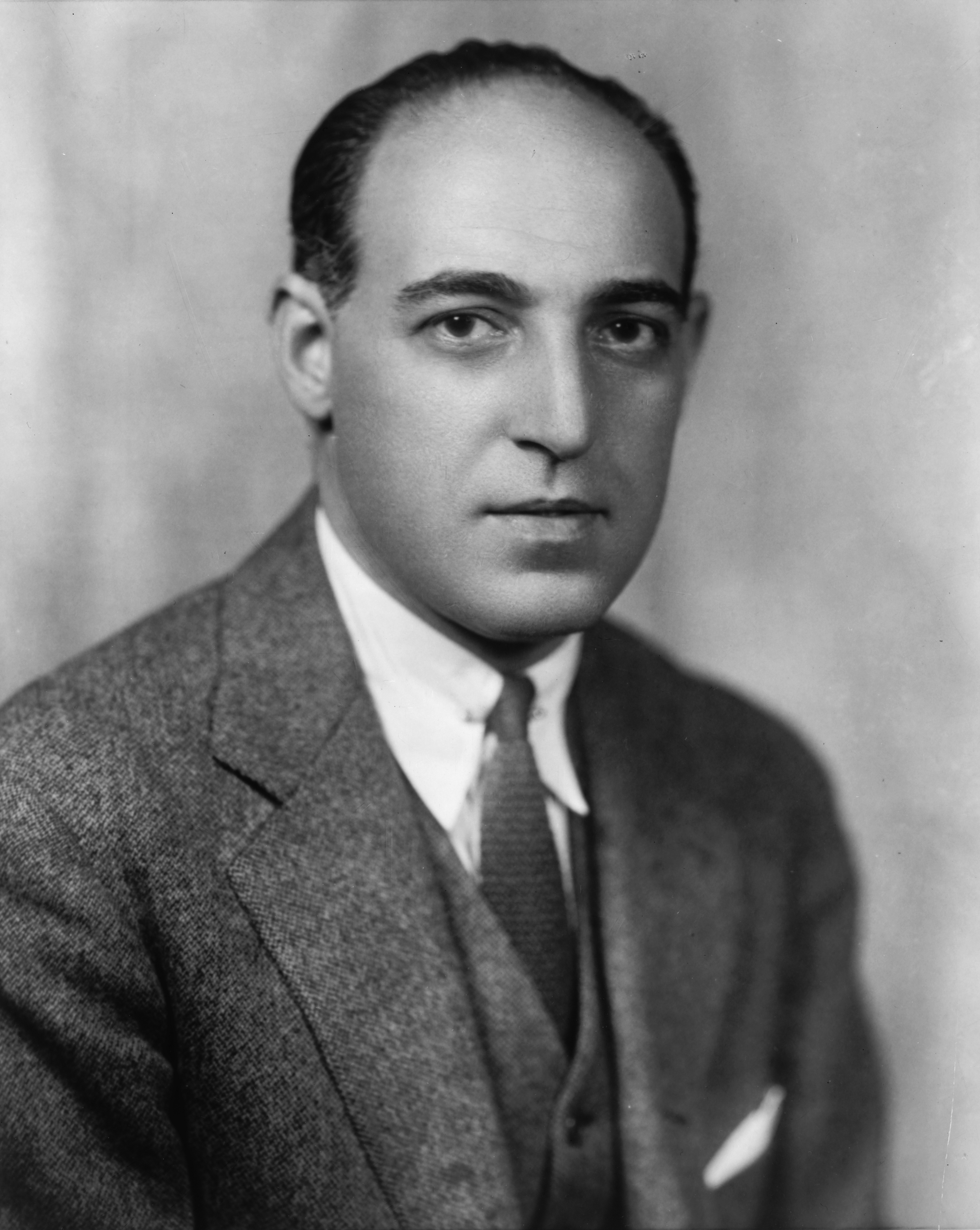

9th United States Ambassador to Canada
- In office November 1, 1948 – March 28, 1950
- President: Harry Truman
- Preceded by: Ray Atherton
- Succeeded by: Stanley Woodward

United States Ambassador to Czechoslovakia
- In office July 20, 1945 – September 19, 1948
- President: Harry Truman
- Preceded by: Anthony Joseph Drexel Biddle Jr.
- Succeeded by: Joseph E. Jacobs

10th United States Ambassador to Turkey
- In office March 10, 1942 – April 2, 1945
- President: Franklin D. Roosevelt
- Preceded by: John Van Antwerp MacMurray
- Succeeded by: Edwin C. Wilson

United States Ambassador to the Soviet Union
- In office August 11, 1939 – November 12, 1941
- President: Franklin D. Roosevelt
- Preceded by: Joseph E. Davies
- Succeeded by: William H. Standley

United States Ambassador to Peru
- In office September 13, 1937 – April 10, 1939
- President: Franklin D. Roosevelt
- Preceded by: Fred Morris Dearing
- Succeeded by: Raymond Henry Norweb

United States Minister to Sweden
- In office August 28, 1933 – June 26, 1937
- President: Franklin D. Roosevelt
- Preceded by: John Motley Morehead III
- Succeeded by: Fred Morris Dearing

Personal details
- Born: Laurence Adolph Steinhardt; October 6, 1892 New York City, U.S.
- Died: March 28, 1950 (aged 57) near Ramsayville, Ontario, Canada
- Resting place: Arlington National Cemetery
- Spouse: Dulcie Hofmann Steinhardt Beau
- Education: Columbia University (BA, MA, LLB)
- Profession: Diplomat; lawyer

Laurence Adolph Steinhardt (October 6, 1892 – March 28, 1950) was an American economist, lawyer, and senior diplomat of the United States Department of State who served as U.S. Ambassador to six countries. He served as U.S. First Minister to Sweden (1933–1937), U.S. Ambassador to Peru (1937–1939), U.S. Ambassador to the Soviet Union (1939–1941), U.S. Ambassador to Turkey (1942–1945), U.S. Ambassador to Czechoslovakia (1945–1948) and United States Ambassador to Canada (1948–1950). He was killed in a U.S. embassy plane crash on March 28, 1950, in Ramsayville, Ontario, Canada, while serving as U.S. Ambassador to Canada. He was the first United States Ambassador to be killed in the line of duty.

== Biography ==
Laurence A. Steinhardt was born October 6, 1892, at his family home (23 East 92nd Street) in New York City. As a native New Yorker, he was educated at the Franklin School for Boys and graduated from Columbia University with an A.B in 1913, an M.A. in 1915 and an LL.B. in 1915 from Columbia Law School. He became a member of Pi Lambda Phi fraternity (New York) in 1909, National President in 1915, and Supreme Rex for life from 1939 to 1950. He was permanent treasurer of the class of 1913 and class of 1915 Columbia Law School.

He was the son of Adolph Maximillian Steinhardt (one of the founders and executive heads of National Enameling and Stamping Co.) and Addie Untermyer Steinhardt (a sister to lawyer Samuel Untermyer).

He married Dulcie Yates Hofmann, daughter of Henry Hofmann (banker) and Ina Maitland Yates Hofmann, on January 15, 1923. He had one daughter, Dulcie-Ann Steinhardt (1925–2001).

He practiced accountancy with Deloitte, Plender and Griffiths, was admitted to the New York bar in October 1915, enlisted in the U.S Army 60th Field Artillery in 1916 as a private/sharpshooter, was honorably discharged in 1918 as a sergeant Quartermaster Corps after serving as associate counsel on the Provost Marshal General Staff. He served as counsel for the Housing and Health Division of the War Department in 1919, and was a member of the law firm Guggenheimer, Untermyer and Marshall from 1920 to 1933. Other notable jurists and family members of Guggenheimer, Untermyer and Marshall were Samuel Untermyer, Louis Marshall, Charles S. Guggenheimer, Alvin Untermyer and Irwin Untermyer.

In 1932, in active support of Governor Franklin D. Roosevelt’s pre-convention presidential campaign, he joined the inner campaign circle committee, composed of political notables Louis Howe, Jimmy Farley, Frank Walker, and Ed Flynn. Specifically, with his economic background on FDR's finance committee, he wrote campaign speeches on the economics of the time for FDR.

He entered the U.S. diplomatic service at ambassadorial rank in 1933 at the behest of President Franklin D. Roosevelt as First Minister to Sweden (1933–1937), U.S. Ambassador to Peru (1937–1939), U.S. Ambassador to the Soviet Union (1939–1941), U.S. Ambassador to Turkey (1942–1945), U.S. Ambassador to Czechoslovakia (1945–1948), United States Ambassador to Canada (1948–1950).

He was awarded the Order of the Polar Star in 1936 by King Gustav V of Sweden; inscribed in The Golden Book, Jewish National Fund, Jewish Agency for Palestine, 1944; awarded the United States Typhus Commission Medal in 1945 by President Franklin D. Roosevelt; awarded the Medal for Merit in 1946 by President Harry S. Truman; awarded posthumously the Honorary Doctor of Laws, Hamilton College, 1950.

He was the author of numerous publications:

- Legal Status of the Trade Union, June 1915
- Medical Jurisprudence: The Rules of Law Governing the Liability of Physicians and Surgeons for Malpractice, Journal of the American Medical Association, March 2, 1918, vol. 70, pp. 585–587.
- Medical Jurisprudence: The General Rules of Law Governing the Compensation of Physician and Surgeons, July 9, 1921, vol. 77, pp. 98–100.
- The Regulation and Control of Physicians and Surgeons by Public Authority, Journal of the American Medical Association, June 4, 1927, vol, 88, pp. 1833–1835.
- The Truth, the Whole Truth, and Nothing but the Truth, 1931

Directorships: Fruit & Produce Acceptance Corp., Lessing's Inc., Louis Phillipe Inc., Leopold Stern and Sons Inc., Affiliated Products Inc., United Steel and Tube Inc., Neet Inc., G.R. Kinney & Co., Jean Patou Inc., Immac Inc., Encyclopædia Britannica Inc.,

Member of numerous organizations: American Bar Association/ Atlantic Beach Club/ Bankers Club of New York/ Bar Association of the City of New York/ Columbia University Club/ Columbia Varsity Club/ Democratic National Finance Committee/ Executive Finance Committee of the Democratic National Campaign Committee/ Federation of American Zionists and the American Zion Commonwealth/ National Democratic club/ Member, President Roosevelt's pre-convention campaign committee/ Pi Lambda Phi

In 1941, immediately prior to Germany's bombing assault on Moscow and with only six hours notice, Steinhardt sent his wife, daughter and her governess, each carrying only one suitcase, out to Stockholm on one of the last planes departing with families of diplomats to any safer destinations within Europe. Steinhardt then returned his attention to the ongoing preparations to evacuate and accompany the remaining U.S. embassy staff to Kuybyshev (now Samara) and took seven days by train to go some 400 miles east of Moscow to this destination, designated by the Kremlin for remaining diplomats. Once the staff was situated in spartan housing with the entire stock of embassy foodstuffs brought along and sufficient to feed the greater diplomatic corps in addition to the staff, he returned to the U.S. embassy residence in Moscow during the bombings to secure the embassy with a skeleton staff of six. He was known within family circles to say he took great pride in working alongside his amazing staff in his embassy postings. In July of this period, the famed photographer, Margaret Bourke-White, managed to get into Moscow to the embassy residence so as to document the German bombings. On the nights of July 23 and July 26 she and Steinhardt lay on their backs on the roof of Spaso House while she photographed German bombs, Nazi parachute flares, tracer bullets, and anti-aircraft gunshots streaking across the nighttime sky overhead. Her portfolio assignment produced startling visual imagery for the American public in the issue of Life Magazine, Vol 11, No 9., pp. 15–21. dated September 1, 1941, Kuybyshev.

On January 12, 1942, Steinhardt was appointed Ambassador to Turkey. His mission directives included buying up all the available sources of chrome the Nazis needed for the manufacture of steel for their war machine. More challenging was the deep rooted presence in Istanbul of the highest flange of German diplomats led by German Ambassador Franz von Papen whose objective was to bring Turkey into the German side of the war. Steinhardt's mission directive was to bring Turkey into the Allied side of the war. Each was crafty, intense, and possessed with the access to vast intelligence gathering network sources. Turkey was the battleground during this critical period of 1942 to 1945 as so much hung in the balance, not the least of which was Turkey's important geographic location, then and now. By 1944, Turkey had turned west to the Allies, an historical orientation originally seeded by Kemal Atatürk in 1923 to turn Turkey into a modern secular nation while still keeping its foundational character.

While Ambassador to Turkey, Steinhardt, in part due to his Jewish heritage, played a significant but not openly known role (due to his public diplomatic position) in numerous Jewish- related refugee transit evacuations: the rescue of Hungarian Jews from Bergen Belsen, Jewish children from Romania, and many eminent intellectuals fleeing Europe to find refuge in Turkey, Palestine, and the United States. In personal subterranean concert with the Vatican's representative to Turkey, Papal Nuncio Cardinal Angelo Giuseppe Roncalli (1881–1963), they devised false visa schemes to facilitate the documents needed for transit through Turkey for fleeing refugees. Steinhardt and Ira Hirschmann of The War Refugee Board secured leaky boats wherever possible with no assurance of the safety of such vessels but the hope that anything might succeed if tried. While there were successes, sadly there were also tragedies and losses.

Cardinal Roncalli was elected in 1958 by the Vatican conclave to become Pope John XXIII and subsequently was canonized as a saint. The highest note of his papacy was Vatican II, also known as the Second Vatican Council (1962–1965).

On August 1, 1943, Operation Tidal Wave, the air attack by U.S. Army Air Forces based in Libya and Southern Italy, began their daring strategic bombing mission over the Ploiesti refineries and oilfields in Romania in order to deny the German war machine of needed fuel. This was aided by the uses of the Norden bombsight for pinpoint accuracy. This is now considered by many World War II military historians as one of the costliest and bloodiest missions of the war. Of the 53 aircraft and 660 crew members lost, many had little or no fuel to return to their bases, so they were instructed to ditch in neutral Turkey where there was a substantial American presence to assist and on which to fall back. Many a dark unlit night following the bombing raid, Steinhardt and his daughter, in a jeep with a small convoy of his embassy military personnel, sortied out into the wilds and deserts attempting to locate and return wounded American pilots, destroy the bombsights so the Germans would not know of their existence, return with the wounded, secretly patching them up by the embassy medical team and moving them quietly through channels back to their points of origin. Some were slipped out to the coast at Izmir and quietly put on sailboats bound for Lebanon or Palestine. Two flyers were smuggled out when Mrs. Steinhardt and her daughter suddenly announced their "shopping trip" to Beirut. Hidden under the sleeper bunks of Mrs. Steinhardt's train compartment, they remained unknown to all until arrival at the border when they escaped.

Steinhardt was buried in Arlington National Cemetery.

== Family ==
He married the former Dulcie Yates Hofmann (1895–1974) on January 15, 1923; one daughter, Dulcie-Ann Steinhardt (1925–2001).

== See also ==
- John Gordon Mein, the next US ambassador to die in the line of duty

Diplomatic posts
Preceded by Fred Morris Dearing	United States Ambassador to Peru; 1937–1939	Succeeded by Raymond Henry Norweb
Preceded by Joseph E. Davies	United States Ambassador to the Soviet Union; 1939–1941	Succeeded by William H. Standley
Preceded by John Van Antwerp MacMurray	United States Ambassador to Turkey; 1941–1945	Succeeded by Edwin C. Wilson
Preceded by Anthony J. Biddle, Jr.	United States Ambassador to Czechoslovakia; 1944–1948	Succeeded by Joseph E. Jacobs
Preceded by Ray Atherton	United States Ambassador to Canada; 1948–1950	Succeeded by Stanley Woodward
