= Ira Hirschmann =

American business executive (1901–1989)

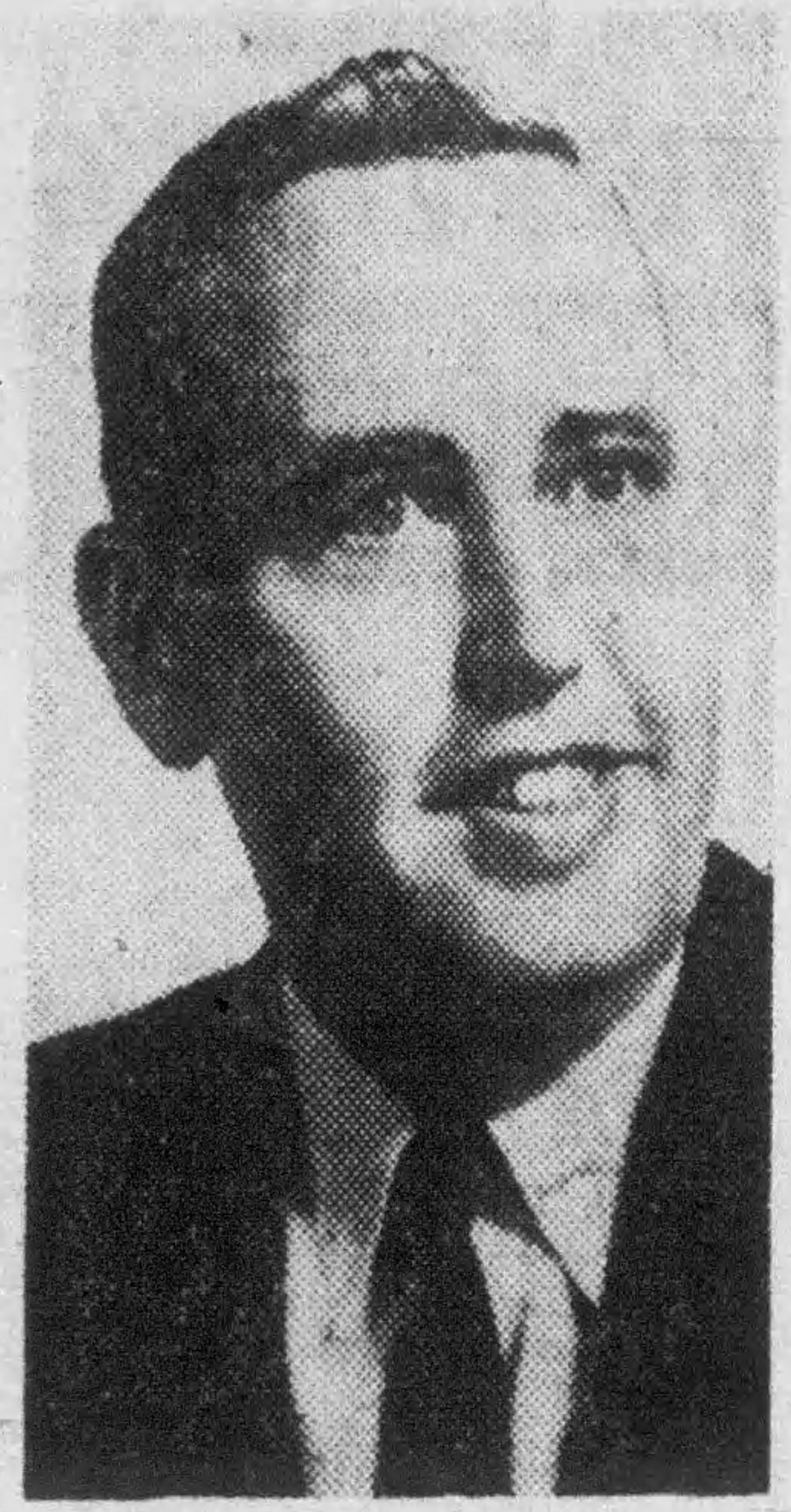

Ira Arthur Hirschmann (July 7, 1901 – October 9, 1989) was an American businessman and diplomat.

== Biography ==
Hirschmann was born into a wealthy family in Baltimore. He attended Johns Hopkins University before starting work as an advertising and sales manager for L. Bamberger & Co. Using his advertising experience, he eventually became the vice president of marketing for Bloomingdale's. In 1935 he was elected as the vice president of Saks Fifth Avenue. He resigned from the vice-president position in 1938.

Hirschmann was an amateur pianist who studied with Artur Schnabel. In 1936, Hirschmann organized a boycott of Wilhelm Furtwängler when he was proposed as a successor to Toscanini for the conductor of the New York Philharmonic. After the war, he continued to criticize Furtwängler, arguing against Yehudi Menuhin's argument that Furtwängler had aided Jewish musicians. Hirschmann founded the New Friends of Music in 1937, a group promoting chamber music in New York that sponsored performances by Rudolf Serkin and Adolf Busch, among others. The group attempted to increase access to music with low-priced tickets and to show that there was "a large public for the best in music".

In addition to his business and music interests, Hirschmann was active in politics. Hirschmann attended the Évian Conference but left early, describing it as "a facade behind which the civilized governments could hide their inability to act". Hirschmann was appointed as the War Refugee Board's special attaché in Romania, where he convinced the Romanian government to allow the immigration 48,000 Jews from Transnistria into Romania. He later served as special agent of the War Refugee Board in Ankara In this post, Hirschmann assisted in the rescue of Jews from Eastern Europe, by pressuring governments to allow Jewish immigration through Turkey. Using funds provided by the Joint Distribution Committee, Hirschmann hired ship captains to transport Jews from Romania to Turkey and provided them with travel visas. In 1944, the year Hirschmann started work in Turkey with Laurence Steinhardt, 14,164 refugees were able to travel through Turkey to Palestine.

Hirschmann was critical of Truman's policy towards post-war Germany, signing a statement in 1946 that accused his government of shielding Nazis from punishment for "hope of future gain and control of a base of operations in the dangerous game of power politics". He was friends with Fiorello La Guardia, often accompanying him to performances at the New York Philharmonic. Hirschmann used this connection for his diplomatic work, since La Guardia became head of the United Nations Relief and Rehabilitation Administration in 1946. Hirschmann supported the Bergson Group, which attempted to raise awareness about the treatment of Jews in post-war Europe. He was a sponsor of the Cultural and Scientific Conference for World Peace held in New York in March 1949. In 1951, he spoke as a representative of the State Department at the Zagreb Peace Conference, defending the government's policy in the Korean War. In 1962, a group of New York businessmen tried to convince Robert F. Wagner to nominate Hirschmann as the Democratic nominee for mayor. He was a sponsor of the National Committee for a Sane Nuclear Policy, signing a 1963 advertisement in The New York Times asking the Senate to ratify the nuclear test-ban agreement proposed by Averell Harriman and Khrushchev.

== Bibliography ==
- Life Line to a Promised Land. Vanguard Press, 1946
- Oil and Blood Don't Mix. Independent Citizens. Committee of the Arts, Sciences and Professions, 1946
- The Embers Still Burn:An Eye-witness View of the Postwar Ferment in Europe and the Middle East and Our Disastrous Get-soft-with-Germany Policy. University of California, 1949
- Caution to the Winds. D. McKay, 1962
- Red Star Over Bethlehem: Russia Drives to Capture the Middle East. Simon & Schuster, 1971, ISBN 978-0-671-20849-3
- The Awakening: The Story of the Jewish National Fund. Shengold, 1981, ISBN 978-0-88400-073-0
- Questions and Answers about Arabs and Jews. Bantam, 1977, ISBN 978-0-553-11199-6
- Obligato: Untold tales from a life with music. Fromm International Publishing, New York, ISBN 0-88064-154-1
