= Matthew McCloskey =

American diplomat, businessman and Democratic Party fundraiser

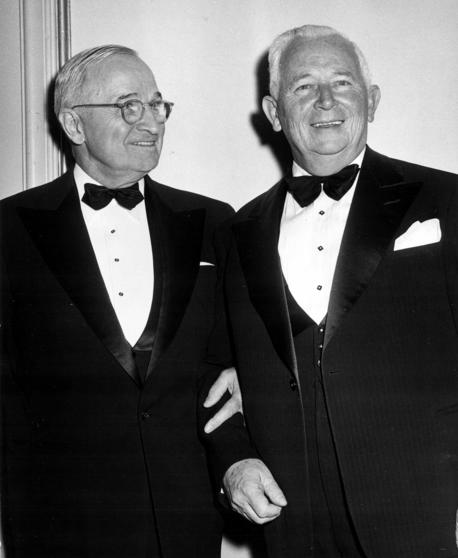
- McCloskey (at right) with Ex-President Truman c. 1962

United States Ambassador to Ireland
- In office July 19, 1962 – June 7, 1964
- President: John F. Kennedy
- Preceded by: Grant Stockdale
- Succeeded by: Raymond R. Guest

Treasurer of the Democratic National Committee
- In office January 20, 1955 – April 5, 1962
- Preceded by: Stanley Woodward
- Succeeded by: Richard MaGuire

Personal details
- Born: February 26, 1893 Wheeling, West Virginia, U.S.
- Died: April 26, 1973 (aged 80) Philadelphia, Pennsylvania, U.S.
- Party: Democratic
- Spouse: Helen Dudley
- Children: 6, including Thomas

Matthew Henry McCloskey Jr. (February 26, 1893 – April 26, 1973) was a Philadelphia businessman and Democratic fundraiser who served as United States Ambassador to Ireland from 1962 to 1964.

== Biography ==
McCloskey was born in West Virginia, and moved to Philadelphia with his family when he was two years old. At the age of 15 he left school and started working in construction; after a few years he started his own company. Buildings by the McCloskey Construction Company include the Rayburn House Office Building Philadelphia Convention Hall, the Philadelphia Sheraton Hotel, the District of Columbia Stadium (now RFK Stadium), and the NIH Clinical Center (with John McShain). "Matt: A Biography of Matthew H. McCloskey" by Robert J Ehlinger details McCloskey's life story. From 1943 to 1948, to help with the World War II efforts, McCloskey & Company built ships at the McCloskey & Company Shipyard in Tampa, Florida.

=== Democratic Party ===
McCloskey was an active Democrat and was a delegate to the Democratic National Convention in 1936, 1940, 1944 and 1948. In 1955, he became Treasurer of the Democratic National Committee, a role he held until 1962. He is credited with inventing $100-a-plate fundraising dinners.

=== Ambassador to Ireland ===
In 1962, McCloskey was appointed ambassador to Ireland by President Kennedy. After confirmation by the Senate, he presented his credentials to Irish leaders on July 19, 1962, and had the official title of Ambassador Extraordinary and Plenipotentiary.

=== Resignation ===
In early 1964, it was reported that McCloskey would resign his Ireland post in order to assist with fundraising for that year's presidential election. Shortly thereafter, his construction firm was named in a lawsuit alleging defective work during construction of a hospital in Boston, and in an FBI investigation into the awarding of contracts for District of Columbia Stadium work. His resignation as ambassador became official on June 7, 1964.

== Personal life ==
McCloskey and his wife had six children, including Thomas McCloskey who succeeded his father in running the construction company. McCloskey died in Philadelphia in April 1973.

Diplomatic posts
Preceded by Grant Stockdale	United States Ambassador to Ireland; 1962–1964	Succeeded by Raymond R. Guest
