= Stanley Woodward (political aide) =

American diplomat (1899–1992)

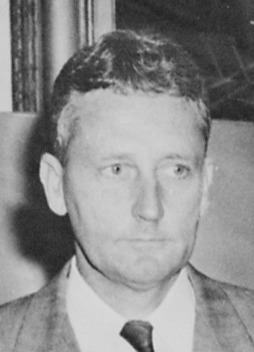
- Woodward in 1948

Treasurer of the Democratic National Committee
- In office December 13, 1953 – January 7, 1955
- Preceded by: Dwight R. G. Palmer
- Succeeded by: Matthew H. McCloskey

3rd United States Ambassador to Canada
- In office June 22, 1950 – January 14, 1953
- President: Harry S. Truman
- Preceded by: Laurence Steinhardt
- Succeeded by: R. Douglas Stuart

7th Chief of Protocol of the United States
- In office January 15, 1944 – May 22, 1950
- President: Franklin D. Roosevelt; Harry S. Truman
- Preceded by: George T. Summerlin
- Succeeded by: John F. Simmons

Personal details
- Born: Stanley Woodward; March 12, 1899 Philadelphia, Pennsylvania
- Died: August 17, 1992 (aged 93) Washington, D.C.
- Education: Yale University

Stanley Woodward Sr. (March 12, 1899 – August 17, 1992) was the White House Chief of Protocol under President Franklin Delano Roosevelt and United States Ambassador to Canada under President Harry S. Truman.

== Biography ==
Born in Philadelphia, Pennsylvania Woodward studied at Yale University, graduated in 1922 and was a 1922 initiate into the Skull and Bones Society. He later was a teacher for a year at Ya-Li. After teaching in China he took an extended tour through Malaya and India. On October 20, 1923 Woodward married Shirley Rutherfoord, whom he had met when she visited Yale while a student at Vassar College and become more acquainted with while they were both teachers in China. Woodward then studied at the Ecole des Science Politiques in Paris.

He was a Foreign Service officer in Europe and Haiti from the mid-1920s to the mid-1930s before returning to Philadelphia as commissioner of Fairmount Park. He returned to the Foreign Service in 1937, serving first as assistant chief of protocol and then as chief of protocol at the State Department until his appointment as ambassador in 1950.

He was a favorite social companion of FDR. Notable for his cautiousness in protecting Axis diplomats at the onset of World War II, he was also largely responsible for the introduction of black tie attire as acceptable formalwear.

He served as the United States Ambassador to Canada (1950–53).
