= Fred Morris Dearing =

American diplomat (1879–1963)

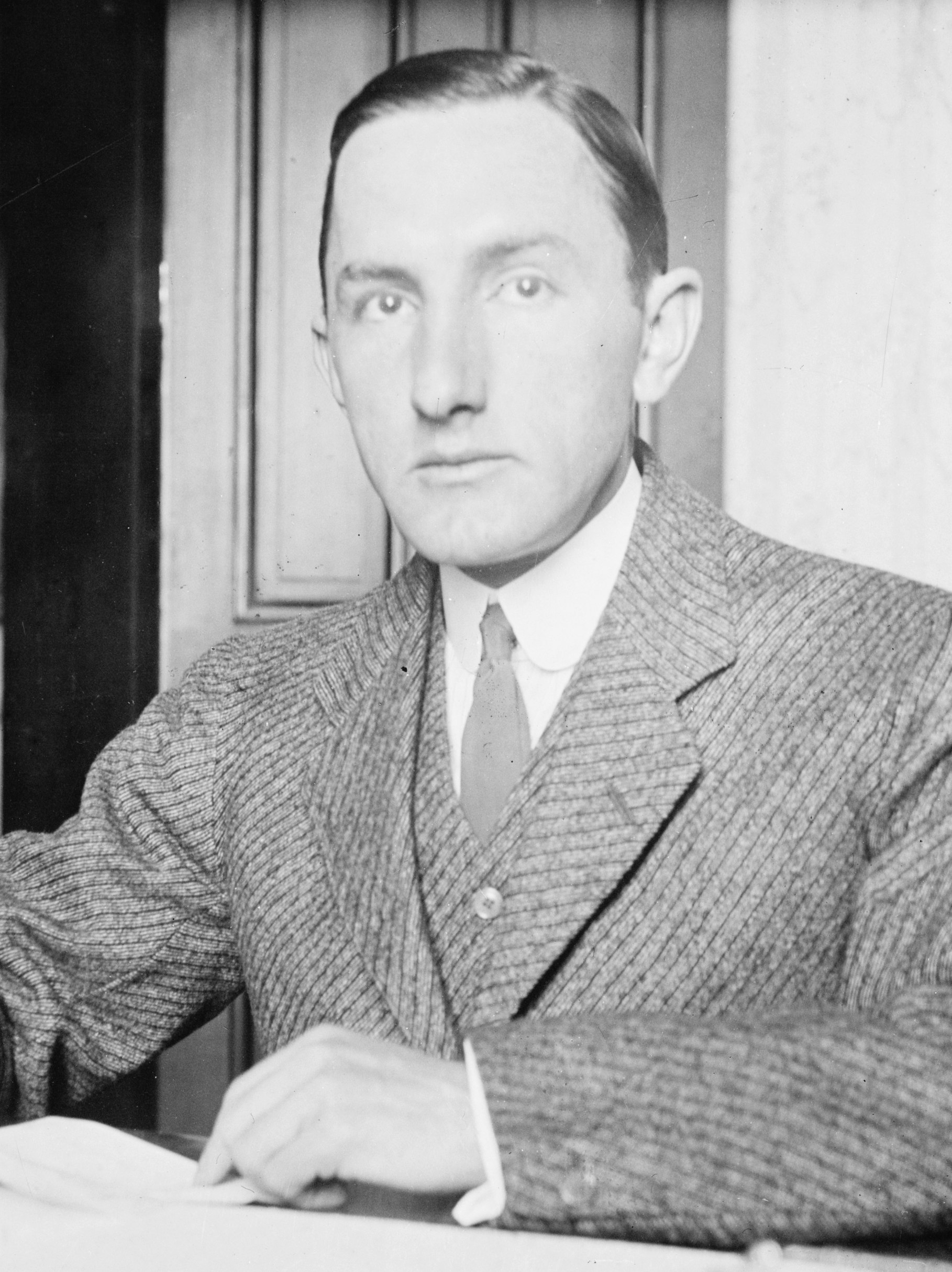
- Born: November 19, 1879; Columbia, Missouri, U.S.
- Died: June 1963
- Resting place: Columbia Cemetery
- Education: University of Missouri

Fred Morris Dearing (November 19, 1879 – June 1963) was a United States diplomat.

== Biography ==
Fred Morris Dearing was born in Columbia, Missouri on November 19, 1879. He was a graduate of the University of Missouri.

He was a career officer in the United States Foreign Service. In the administration of President of the United States Warren G. Harding, Dearing was United States Assistant Secretary of State under United States Secretary of State Charles Evans Hughes from March 11, 1921 to February 28, 1922. He served as U.S. Minister to Portugal from June 6, 1922 to February 28, 1930. He was U.S. Minister to Peru from May 23, 1930 to June 3, 1937. He was U.S. Minister to Sweden from April 22, 1937 to September 23, 1937.

Dearing died in 1963.

Government offices
| Preceded by William Phillips | United States Assistant Secretary of State; March 11, 1921 – February 28, 1922 | Succeeded by Leland B. Harrison |
Diplomatic posts
| Preceded by Thomas H. Birch | United States Ambassador to Portugal; June 6, 1922 – February 28, 1930 | Succeeded by John Glover South |
| Preceded by Alexander Pollock Moore | United States Ambassador to Peru; May 23, 1930 – June 3, 1937 | Succeeded by Laurence Steinhardt |
| Preceded by Laurence Steinhardt | United States Ambassador to Sweden; April 22, 1937 – September 23, 1937 | Succeeded by Frederick A. Sterling |
