= Democratic National Committee =

Top institution of the U.S. Democratic Party

- Formal logo

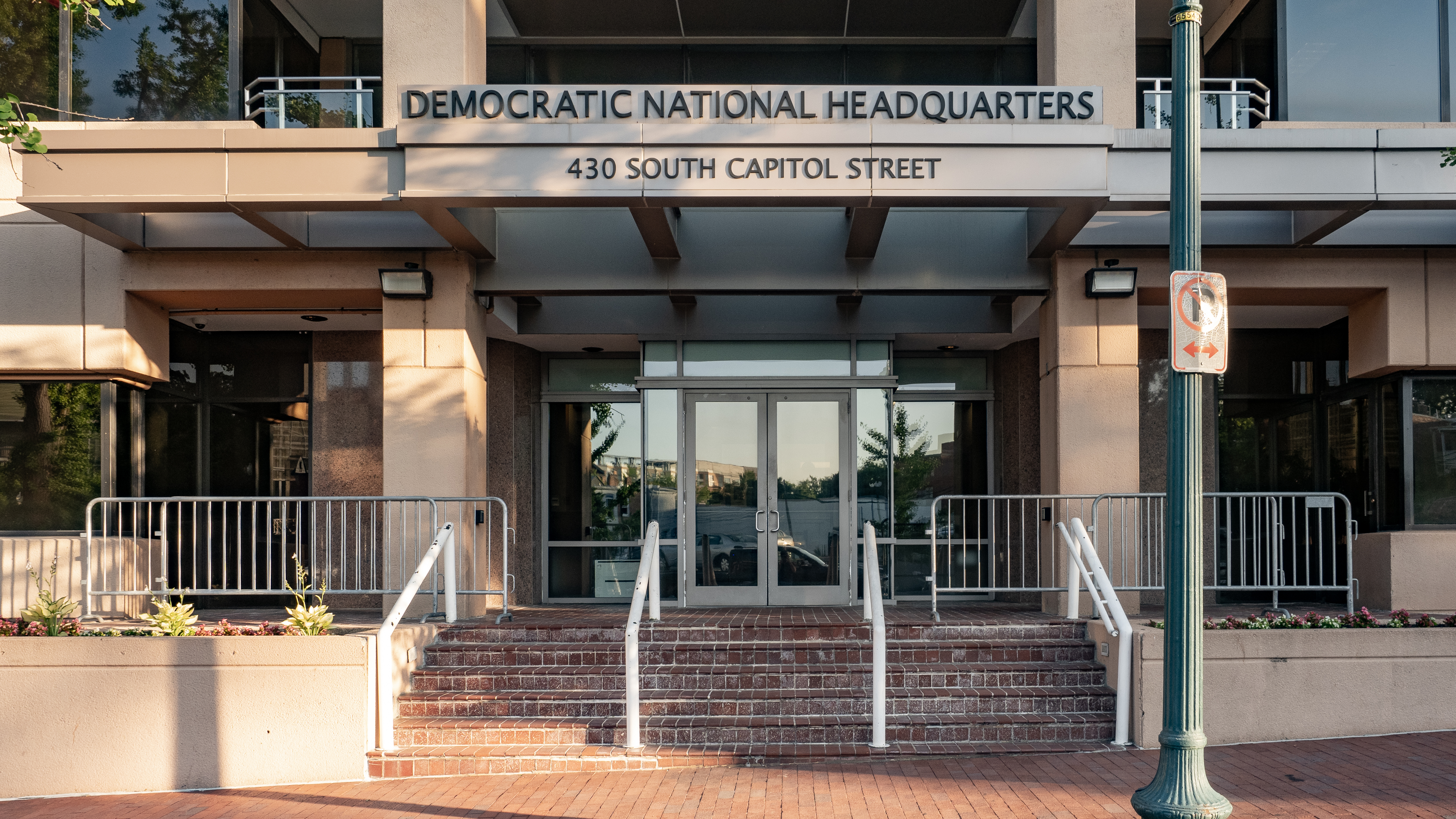
- DNC headquarters in Washington, D.C., 2024
- Founded: May 26, 1848; 178 years ago
- Location(s): 430 South Capitol Street SE, Washington, D.C., U.S.
- Coordinates: 38°53′03″N 77°00′31″W
- Key people: Chair: Ken Martin; Vice Chairs: Reyna Walters-Morgan; Artie Blanco; Jane Kleeb; Malcolm Kenyatta; Shasti Conrad; Secretary: Jason Rae
- Affiliations: Democratic Party
- Website: democrats.org

The Democratic National Committee (DNC) is the principal executive leadership board of the United States's Democratic Party. According to the party charter, it has "general responsibility for the affairs of the Democratic Party between National Conventions", and particularly coordinates strategy to support Democratic Party candidates throughout the country for local, state, and national office, as well as works to establish a "party brand" and to formulate the party platform. While it provides support for party candidates, it does not have direct authority over elected officials.

The DNC was established on May 26, 1848, at that year's Democratic National Convention. The DNC's main counterpart is the Republican National Committee.

== Role ==
The DNC is responsible for articulating and promoting the Democratic platform and coordinating party organizational activity. In particular, it organizes and calls for the Democratic National Convention held every four years to nominate candidates for President and Vice President of the United States, and is subsequently responsible for the presidential campaign. The DNC is more focused on campaign and organizational strategy than public policy. According to Boris Heersink, "political scientists have traditionally described the parties' national committees as inconsequential but impartial service providers."

In presidential elections, it supervises the national convention and, both independently and in coordination with the presidential candidate, raises funds, commissions polls, and coordinates campaign strategy. Following the selection of a party nominee, the public funding laws permit the national party to coordinate certain expenditures with the nominee, but additional funds are spent on general, party-building activities. There are state committees in every state, as well as local committees in most cities, wards, and towns (and, in most states, counties).

When the president is a Democrat, the party generally works closely with the president and the White House largely controls the committee.

== Membership and organization ==
The DNC is headed by a chairperson, five vice chairpersons, a treasurer, a secretary, and a national finance chair, who are all elected by vote of members of the Democratic National Committee itself.

According to its charter, the committee is further composed of:

1. two representatives (including the chairperson) of each state committee or US territory
2. 200 additional members apportioned to the states according to their population size (minimum two per state), elected either on the ballot by primary voters or by the state committee or caucus
3. two additional members per US territory, selected by their Democratic parties
4. the Democratic leaders in the US Senate and House of Representatives
5. three Democratic governors (including the chairperson of the Democratic Governors Association), mayors (including the chairperson of the Democratic Mayors Association), county officials (including the chairperson of the National Democratic County Officials), state legislators (including the chairperson of the Democratic Legislative Campaign Committee), and municipal officials (including the chairperson of the Democratic Municipal Officials), respectively
6. three representatives (including the presidents) of the Young Democrats of America and the National Federation of Democratic Women, respectively
7. two representatives (including the chairpersons) of the College Democrats, the Democratic State Treasurers Association, the Democratic Lieutenant Governors Association, the Democratic Association of Secretaries of State, the Democratic Attorneys General Association, the National Democratic Ethnic Coordinating Committee, the National Democratic Seniors Coordinating Council, and the High School Democrats of America, respectively
8. eight representatives of the Democrats Abroad (including the chairperson), who each have half a vote
9. up to 75 additional members elected by the committee.

=== Role in the Democratic National Convention ===
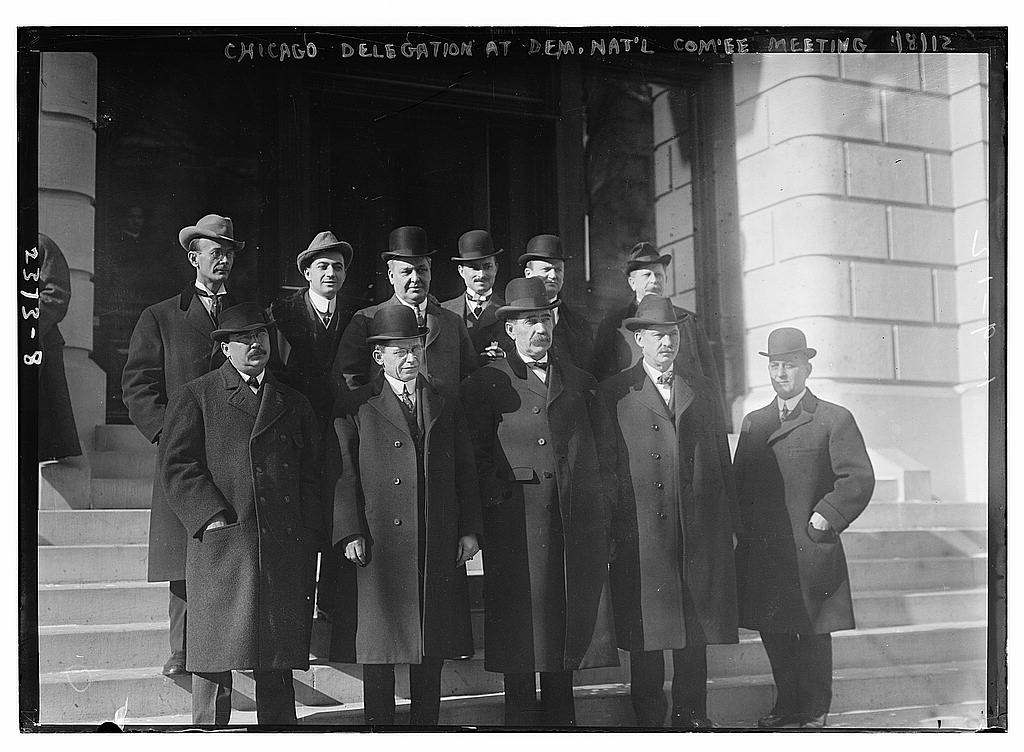
Chicago delegation to the January 8, 1912, Democratic National Committee

All DNC members are superdelegates to the Democratic National Convention, and their role can affect the outcome over a close primary race only if no candidate receives a majority of pledged delegates. These delegates, officially described as "unpledged party leader and elected official delegates," fall into three categories based on other positions they hold:

- elected members of the Democratic National Committee,
- sitting Democratic governors and members of Congress, and
- distinguished party leaders, consisting of current and former presidents, vice presidents, congressional leaders, and DNC chairs, are all superdelegates for life.

The DNC establishes rules for the caucuses and primaries which choose delegates to the Democratic National Convention, but the caucuses and primaries themselves are most often run not by the DNC but instead by each individual state. Primary elections, in particular, are conducted by state governments according to their own laws. Political parties can choose whether to participate and accept the results of a state's primary election.

=== Internal organizations and committees ===
An internal organization, the Association of State Democratic Committees (ASDC, formerly Association of State Democratic Chairs from 1972 to 2017), convenes the state and territorial party chairs and vice chairs. The president of the ASDC serves concurrently as a vice chair of the DNC. Jane Kleeb, chair of the Nebraska Democratic Party since 2016, was elected in 2025 as president of the ASDC, succeeding Ken Martin who had served as president since 2017. The ASDC is assisted by the Association of State Democratic Executive Directors (ASDED), headed by Brad Martin (executive director of the Democratic Party of Oregon) since 2017.

The DNC convenes at least once a year. An Executive Committee of roughly 65 members determined by the DNC is responsible for the affairs of the party and meets at least quarterly. Former Chair of the High School Democrats of America Zayed Kadir was the youngest individual in history to serve on the committee. In addition, a National Advisory Board exists for purposes of fundraising and advising the executive. The present chair is Elizabeth Frawley Bagley, U.S. Ambassador to Brazil.

The DNC in September 2026 announced the formation of a Jewish constituency council to engage Jews ahead of the 2028 election. The Jewish American Council, reported to be chaired by Adam Goldwyn, a North Dakota state representative, was scheduled to hold its first meeting in January 2027.

=== Current leadership ===
Ken Martin, former chair of the Minnesota Democratic–Farmer–Labor Party, was elected chair in the 2025 chairmanship election on February 1, 2025.

Image	Name	Position	Notes
	Ken Martin	Chair	
	Reyna Walters-Morgan	Vice Chair, Civic Engagement and Voter Participation	
	Artie Blanco	Vice Chair	
	Shasti Conrad	Vice Chair	
	Malcolm Kenyatta	Vice Chair	
	Jane Kleeb	Vice Chair	ex officio (ASDC President)
	Chris Korge	Vice Chair	Finance Chair
	Virginia McGregor	Treasurer	
	Jason Rae	Secretary	

Furthermore, the following non-voting officers execute administrative tasks within the DNC:

- Executive Director: Roger Lau, former campaign manager for Elizabeth Warren for President
- Political Director: Alana Mounce, former executive director of the Nevada State Democratic Party
- Chief of Staff: Anatole Jenkins, former national organizing director for Kamala Harris For The People

== List of DNC leaders ==
=== Deputy chairs ===
This is an inactive position.

The deputy chair of the Democratic National Committee was re-established by Tom Perez in February 2017 after his win in the 2017 DNC Chair race.

After a close victory over Minnesota Congressman Keith Ellison, Perez appointed Ellison as deputy chair in an attempt to lessen the divide in the Democratic Party after the contentious 2016 Democratic presidential primaries, which saw conflicts between supporters of Hillary Clinton and Bernie Sanders. Perez was seen as being more in line with the Clinton wing, while Ellison was more in line with the Sanders wing. The role's revival in 2017 has been described by critics as largely titular and ceremonial.

On November 8, 2018, Ellison resigned from the position due to his win in the Minnesota Attorney General election. The position remains unoccupied.

Officeholder		Term	State
Evan Dobelle	Evan Dobelle	1980–1981	Massachusetts
Alexis Herman	Alexis Herman	1989–1992	Alabama
	Ben Johnson	2003–2005	Maryland
Mike Honda	Mike Honda	2003–2005	California
Susan Turnbull	Susan Turnbull	2003–2005	Maryland
Keith Ellison	Keith Ellison	2017–2018	Minnesota

=== Treasurers ===
List of Democratic National Committee treasurers
Officeholder		Term	State
Charles J. Canda	Charles J. Canda	1875–1892	New York
Robert B. Roosevelt	Robert B. Roosevelt	1892–1896	New York
William P. St. Cloud	William P. St. John	1896–1897	New York
James L. Norris	James L. Norris	1897–1900	District of Columbia
Millard Fillmore Dunlap	Millard Fillmore Dunlap	1900–1904	Illinois
George Foster Peabody	George Foster Peabody	1904–1906	New York
August Belmont	August Belmont	1906–1908	
	William H. O'Brien	1908	Indiana
Charles N. Haskell	Charles N. Haskell	1908	Oklahoma
Herman Ridder	Herman Ridder	1908–1912	New York
Rolla Wells	Rolla Wells	1912–1916	Missouri
Wilbur W. Marsh, c. 1916–1920	Wilbur W. Marsh	1916–1924	Iowa
James W. Gerard	James W. Gerard	1924–1932	New York
Frank C. Walker	Frank C. Walker	1932–1934	New York
Walter J. Cummings	Walter J. Cummings	1934–1936	Illinois
W. Forbes Morgan	W. Forbes Morgan	1936–1937	New Hampshire
	Oliver A. Quayle Jr	1937–1941	District of Columbia
R. J. Reynolds Jr.	R. J. Reynolds Jr.	1941–1942	North Carolina
	Edwin W. Pauley	1942–1945	California
George Killion	George Killion	1945–1947	California
	Joe L. Blythe	1948–1949	North Carolina
	Mary C. Zirkle (acting)	1949–1950	Washington
	Sidney Salomon Jr	1950–1951	Missouri
Roy J. Turner	Roy J. Turner	1951–1952	Oklahoma
	Dwight R. G. Palmer	1952–1953	New York
Stanley Woodward	Stanley Woodward	1953–1955	Virginia
Matthew McCloskey	Matthew H. McCloskey	1955–1962	Pennsylvania
	Richard MaGuire	1962–1965	Indiana
	Clifton C. Carter (acting)	1965–1966	District of Columbia
	John Criswell (acting)	1966–1968	Oklahoma
Robert E. Short	Robert E. Short (acting)	1968–1969	Minnesota
	Patrick J. O'Connor (acting)	1969–1970	Minnesota
Robert S. Strauss	Robert S. Strauss	1970–1972	Texas
	Donald Petrie	1972	
	Howard Weingrow	1972	New York
C. Peter McColough	C. Peter McColough	1973–1974	New York
Edward Bennett Williams	Edward Bennett Williams	1974–1977	District of Columbia
	Joel McCleary	1977–1978	North Carolina
Evan Dobelle	Evan Dobelle	1978–1979	Massachusetts
	Peter G. Kelly	1979–1981	Connecticut
	Charles Curry	1981–1983	Missouri
Paul G. Kirk	Paul G. Kirk	1983–1985	Massachusetts
Sharon Pratt Dixon	Sharon Pratt Dixon	1985–1989	District of Columbia
	Robert Farmer	1989–1991	
Robert T. Matsui	Robert T. Matsui	1991–1995	California
	R. Scott Pastrick	1995–1997	Maryland
	Carol Pensky	1997–1999	
Andrew Tobias	Andrew Tobias	1999–2017	
	Bill Derrough	2017–2021	New York
Virginia McGregor	Virginia McGregor	2021–present	Pennsylvania

== History ==
The DNC has existed since 1848. During the 1848 Democratic National Convention, a resolution was passed creating the Democratic National Committee, composed of thirty members, one person per state, chosen by the states' delegations, and chaired by Benjamin F. Hallett.

In order to strengthen the national party organization, Franklin Roosevelt proposed in 1925 that the DNC should open a permanent headquarters in order to function "every day in every year" and exist on a "business-like financial basis." In 1929, John Raskob led the creation of the first permanent national headquarters for the DNC in Washington, DC.

=== Social media presence ===
Founded in 2025, DNC-run fact-checking account "@FactPostNews" is active on TikTok, Facebook, Threads, Bluesky, and X (formerly Twitter).

The DNC also operates the official account of Democratic Party on X, "@TheDemocrats". According to speculations, the account is run by Paulina Mangubat, deputy chief mobilisation officer of DNC. The account is actually managed by a team of about ten DNC staffers.

=== Fairness Doctrine campaign ===
According to a 1975 report in The New York Times, the Democratic National Committee funded clandestine campaigns to use the Fairness Doctrine to target conservative radio broadcasters who were critical of the John F. Kennedy and Lyndon B. Johnson administrations. The DNC funded journalist Fred J. Cook and directed his complaint with the FCC, which ultimately led to the 1969 Red Lion Broadcasting Co. v. FCC Supreme Court decision upholding the Fairness Doctrine.

=== Watergate ===
In the 1970s, the DNC had its head office, located in the Watergate complex at the time, burglarized by entities working for Richard Nixon's administration during the Watergate scandal.

=== Chinagate ===
Chinagate was an alleged effort by the People's Republic of China to influence domestic American politics prior to and during the Clinton administration. In 2002, the Federal Election Commission fined the Democratic National Committee $115,000 for its part in fundraising violations in 1996.

=== Cyber attacks ===
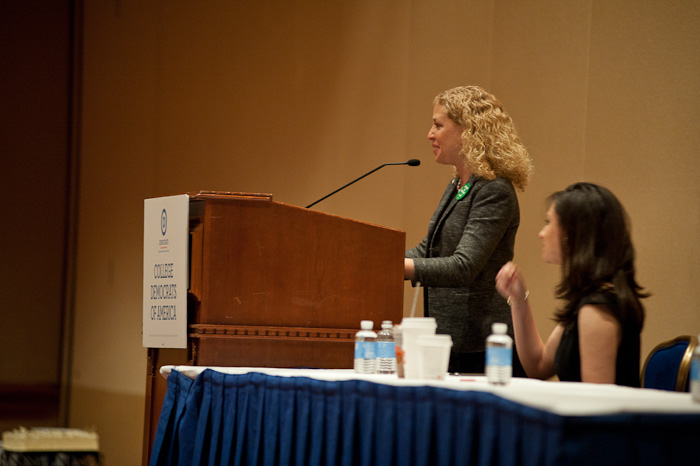
Debbie Wasserman Schultz served as DNC chair from 2011 to 2016.

Cyber attacks and hacks were claimed by or attributed to various individual and groups such as:

- According to committee officials and security experts, two competing Russian intelligence services were discovered on DNC computer networks. One intelligence service achieved infiltration beginning in the summer of 2015 and the other service breached and roamed the network beginning in April 2016. The two groups accessed emails, chats, and research on an opposing presidential candidate. They were expelled from the DNC system in June 2016.
- The hacker Guccifer 2.0 claimed that he hacked into the Democratic National Committee computer network and then leaked its emails to the newspaper The Hill. During a CNN interview with Jake Tapper, Hillary Clinton's campaign manager, Robby Mook, cited experts saying that the DNC emails were leaked by the Russians but did not name the experts. The press and cybersecurity firms discredited the Guccifer 2.0 claim, as investigators now believe Guccifer 2.0 was an agent of the G.R.U., Russia's military intelligence service.

=== 2016 email leak ===
On July 22, 2016, WikiLeaks released approximately 20,000 DNC emails. Critics claimed that the Committee unequally favored Hillary Clinton and acted in support of her nomination while opposing the candidacy of her primary challenger Bernie Sanders. Donna Brazile corroborated these allegations in an excerpt of her book published by Politico in November 2017. The leaked emails spanned sixteen months, terminating in May 2016.

The WikiLeaks releases led to the resignations of Chairperson Debbie Wasserman Schultz, Communications Director Luis Miranda, Chief Financial Officer Brad Marshall and Chief Executive Amy Dacey. After she resigned, Wasserman Schultz put out a statement about possible FBI assistance in investigating the hacking and leaks, saying that "the DNC was never contacted by the FBI or any other agency concerned about these intrusions." During a Senate hearing in January 2017, James Comey testified that the FBI requested access to the DNC's servers, but its request was denied. He also testified that old versions of the Republican National Committee's servers were breached, but then-current databases were unaffected.

The DNC subsequently filed a lawsuit in federal court against WikiLeaks and others alleging a conspiracy to influence the election.

=== 2024 election autopsy report ===
Paul Rivera, the author of the "DNC autopsy", an internal Democrat party report on the 2024 presidential election loss, claims, that an entire section, that included a discussion of inter-generational wealth established by high-ranking elected officials, was cut from the draft version leaked to the New York Times.

== See also ==
- Green National Committee
- Libertarian National Committee
- Information published by WikiLeaks
- Republican National Committee
