= Richard Maguire =

American lawyer and political fundraiser (d. 1983)

Treasurer of the Democratic National Committee
- In office April 1963 – December 1965
- Preceded by: Matthew McCloskey
- Succeeded by: Clifton C. Carter (acting)

Personal details
- Died: February 18, 1983 (age 68)
- Education: Harvard University

Richard Maguire (died February 18, 1983) was an American lawyer and political fundraiser for the Democratic Party, particularly John F. Kennedy and Lyndon B. Johnson. Maguire served as the treasurer of the Democratic National Committee from 1963 to 1965, where he developed a reputation as a secretive yet powerful figure.

== Biography ==
Maguire attended Boston Latin School and Phillips Exeter Academy, before entering Harvard University. At Harvard, he played baseball, and met Joseph P. Kennedy Jr.. He graduated in 1936, and three years later earned a degree from Harvard Law School. Maguire found employment in Boston as a lawyer. For five years (1941-1946), he served in the United States Army, fighting in World War II. After being discharged, he met John F. Kennedy, who at the time was running for a seat in the US House of Representatives. Maguire worked on Kennedy's campaign, as the treasurer.

When Kennedy was elected as president in 1960, Maguire worked as an aide in his office. He was a member of the "Irish mafia"—people who were close to Kennedy before being placed on staff, rather than being affiliated with the broader Democratic Party.

He was appointed by JFK to succeed Matthew McCloskey as Treasurer of the Democratic National Committee (DNC) in April 1963. Maguire established the "President's Club", a program that held dinners with the president at the price of $1,000 per person. This club was partially an effort to free Kennedy from reliance on contributions to his campaign from the broader Democratic party. After the assassination of John F. Kennedy, Maguire was, according to the historian Sean Savage, seemingly Lyndon B. Johnson's most trusted party official, in contrast to other party members who Johnson feared sought to run Robert F. Kennedy as president. Later in 1963, he organized the sale of 68 pages of ads to major corporations in a tribute book to Johnson, raising around a million dollars. Maguire's fundraising programs were highly successful, and allowed the Democratic Committee to pay off $4 million of debt in three years.

Maguire quickly emerged as a prominent member in the Democratic Party's organization. In December 1963, reporters Robert S. Allen and Paul Scott described Maguire as "the real behind-the-scenes power in the [Democratic] national headquarters." They wrote that he was Robert F. Kennedy's "man" in the committee. In February 1965, Maguire drew attention from Senator John J. Williams, who launched an investigation into the DNC's use of their funds. The journalists Rowland Evans and Robert Novak highlighted that Maguire was little-known but a highly effective fundraiser. Evans and Novak described him as "easily the most powerful man in the national party structure." However, he was unwilling to speak to journalists and secretive with his records. In December 1965 he left his role as treasurer of the DNC, which was temporarily filled by Clifton C. Carter. Maguire was eventually replaced by John Criswell.

After leaving DNC leadership, Maguire worked on the finances of the Hubert Humphrey campaign in 1968, and was involved in foundation of the National Council for Civic Responsibility.

== Personal life ==
Maguire lived in East Boston. In 1942 he married Marian Grady, and the couple had five children. He died on February 18, 1983.

== Bibliography ==
- Bohrer, John R. (2017-06-06). The Revolution of Robert Kennedy: From Power to Protest After JFK. Bloomsbury Publishing USA. ISBN 978-1-60819-964-8.
- Savage, Sean J. (2012). JFK, LBJ, and the Democratic Party. State University of New York Press. ISBN 978-0-7914-8468-5.
- O'Donnell, Helen (2015-01-01). The Irish Brotherhood: John F. Kennedy, His Inner Circle, and the Improbable Rise to the Presidency. Catapult. ISBN 978-1-61902-508-0.
- Wainstock, Dennis (2013). Election Year 1968: The Turning Point. Enigma Books. ISBN 978-1-936274-41-3.
- Watson, Robert W. (2007). White House Studies Compendium. Nova Publishers. ISBN 978-1-60021-533-9.
