= 1968 Democratic Party vice presidential candidate selection =

1968 Democratic vice presidential nomination
- August 29, 1968
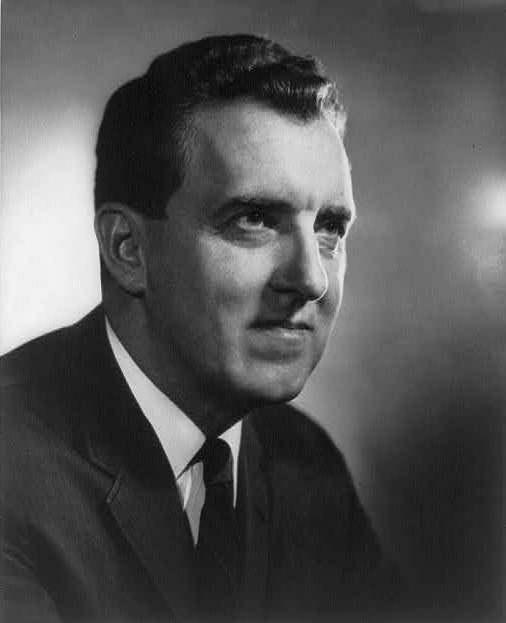
Nominee	Edmund Muskie
Home state	Maine
Previous Vice Presidential nominee
Hubert Humphrey
Vice Presidential nominee
Edmund Muskie

This article lists those who were potential candidates for the Democratic nomination for Vice President of the United States in the 1968 election. After winning the Democratic presidential nomination at the 1968 Democratic National Convention, incumbent Vice President Hubert Humphrey asked the convention to nominate Maine Senator Edmund Muskie as his running mate. The convention overwhelmingly voted to ratify the choice of Muskie, though Julian Bond picked up a scattering of votes. Muskie was surprised by the selection, as he was from a Northeastern state with few electoral votes. Humphrey almost chose Oklahoma Senator Fred R. Harris, but Humphrey decided that Muskie's age, governmental experience, and quiet temperament made him the better candidate. Humphrey also strongly considered South Carolina Governor Robert McNair, his name being "the last name marked off the list" for Humphrey's running mate. McNair was informed that had the Vice President opted for a southerner as a running mate, it would've been him. The Humphrey–Muskie ticket ultimately lost to the Nixon–Agnew ticket in the 1968 election. Muskie's place on the national ticket helped make him an early front-runner for the 1972 Democratic presidential nomination, though Muskie ultimately dropped out of the contest.

== Potential running mates ==
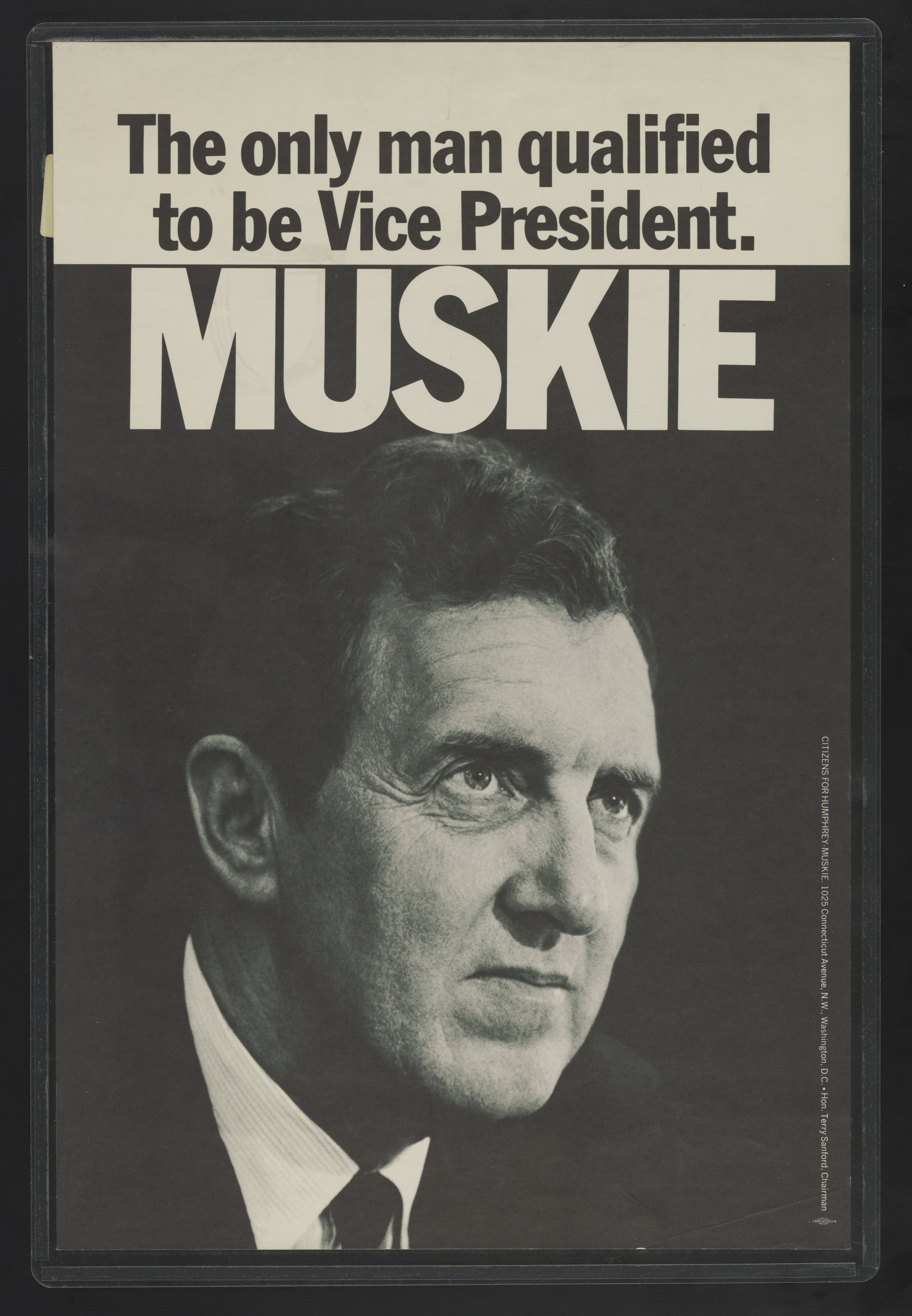
Poster featuring Muskie.

=== Finalists ===
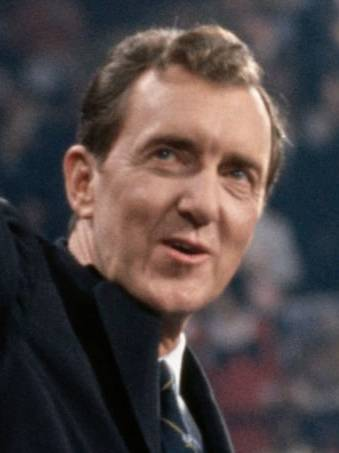
Senator
Edmund Muskie
from Maine
(1959–1980)

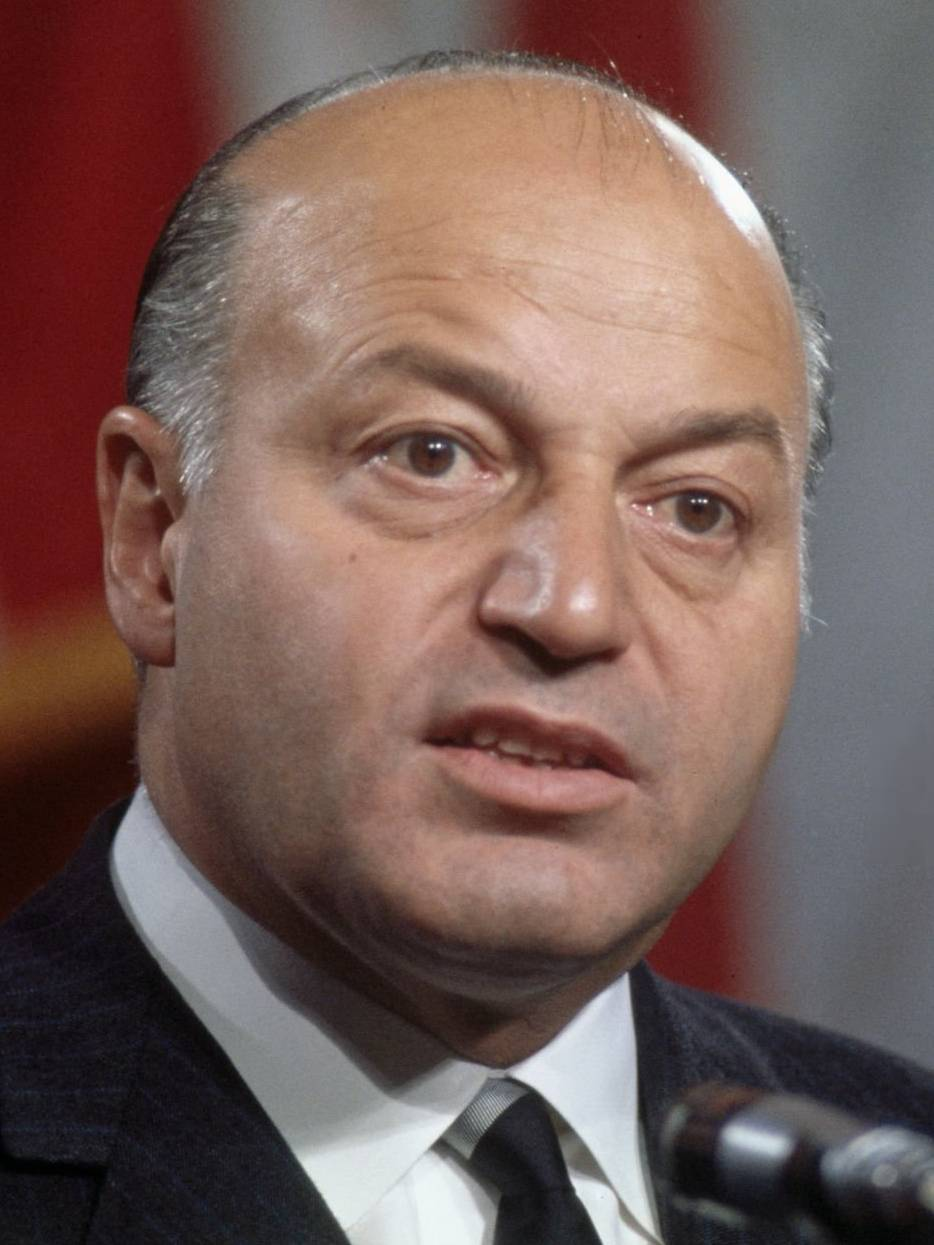
Mayor of San Francisco
Joseph Alioto
from California
(1968–1976)

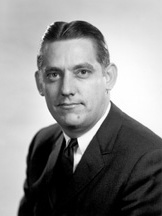
Senator
Fred R. Harris
from Oklahoma
(1964–1973)

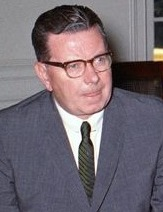
Governor
Richard J. Hughes
of New Jersey
(1962–1970)

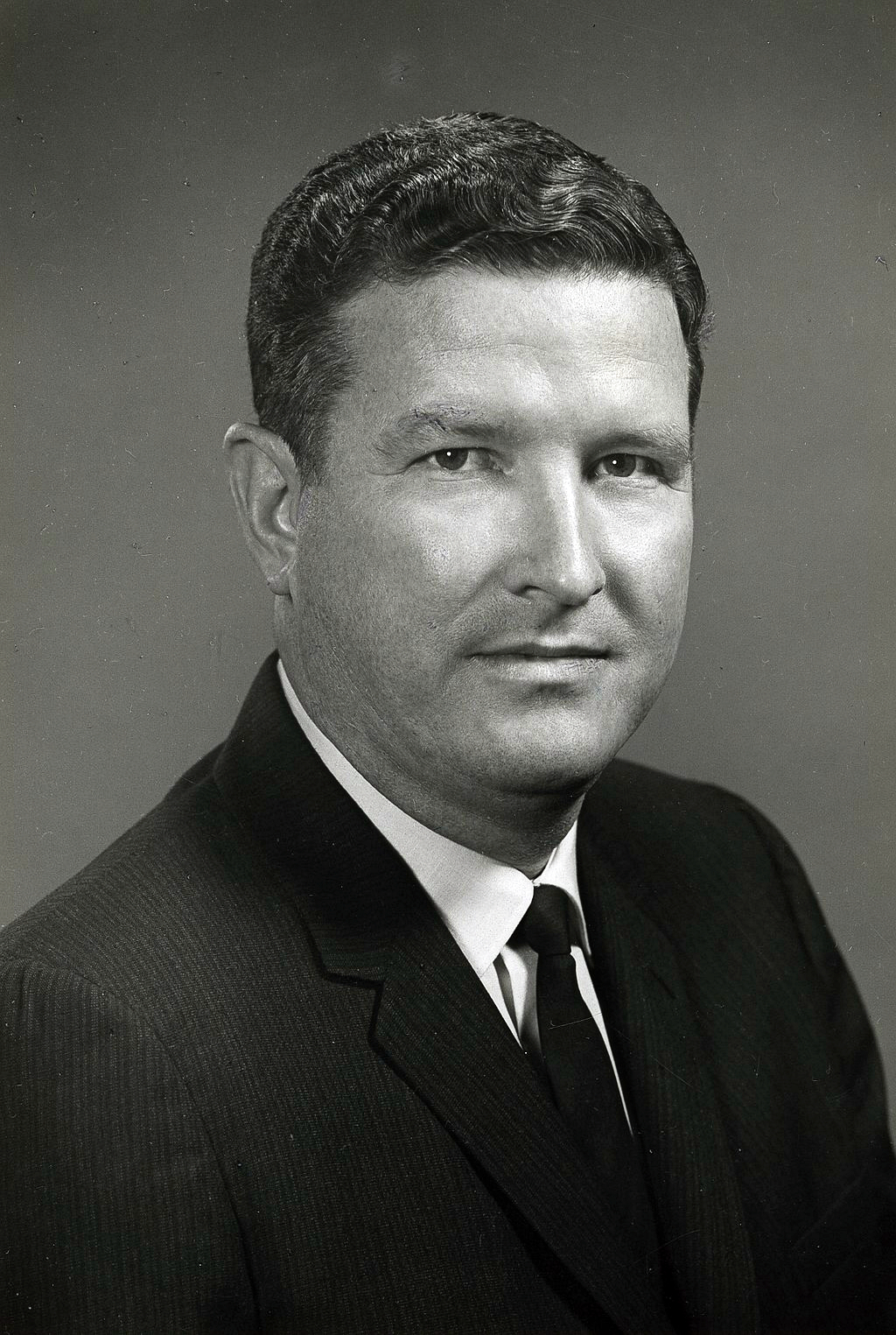
Governor
Robert E. McNair
of South Carolina
(1965–1971)

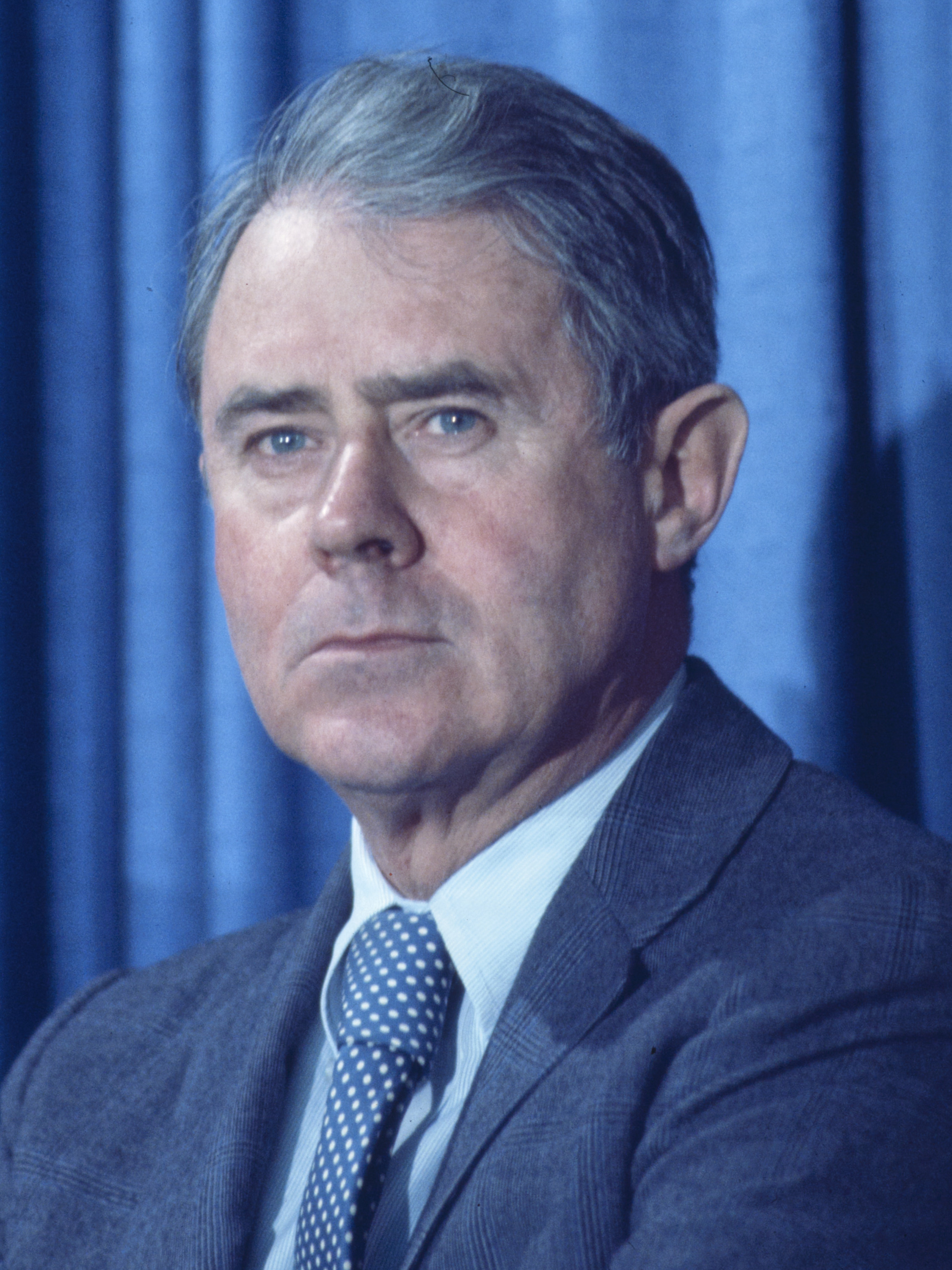
Former Deputy Secretary of Defense
Cyrus Vance
from New York
(1962–1967)

=== Declined ===
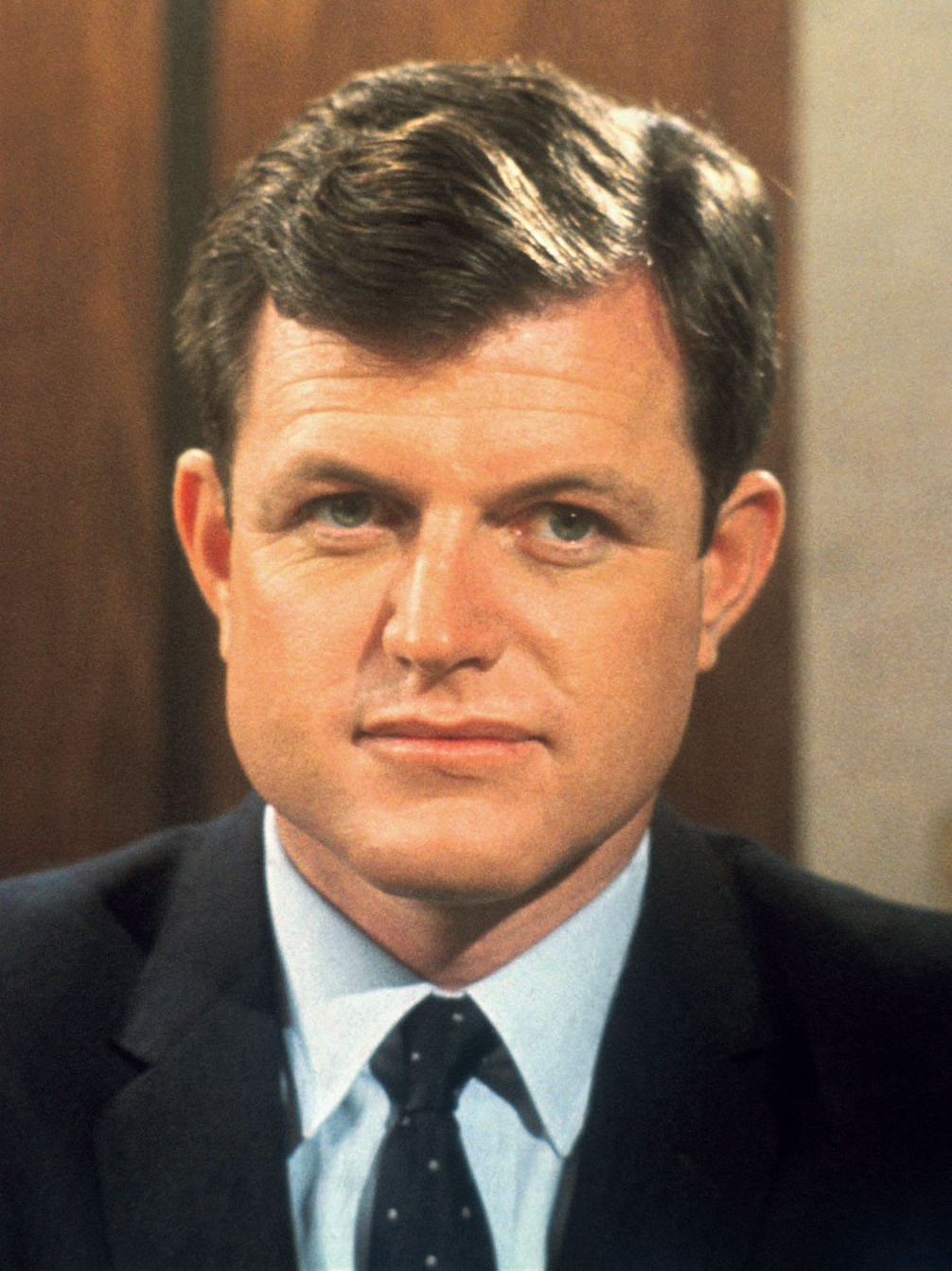
Senator
Ted Kennedy
from Massachusetts
(1962–2009)

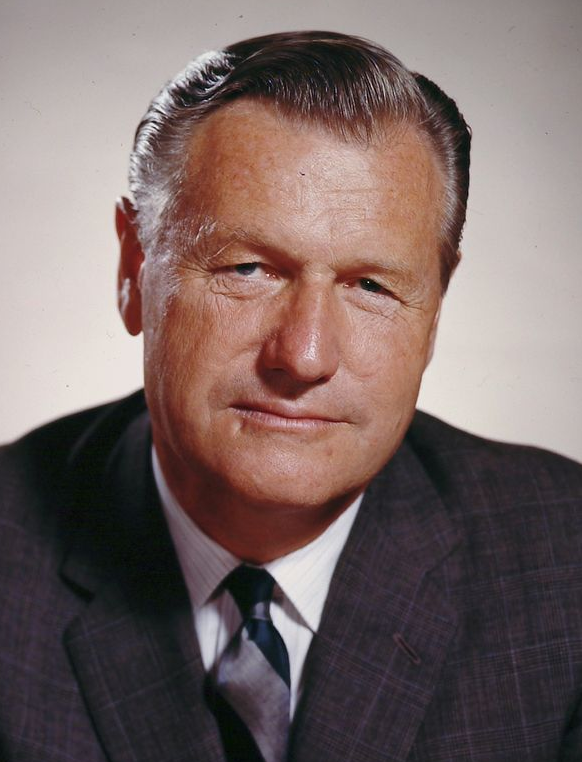
Republican Governor
Nelson Rockefeller
of New York
(1959–1973)

Senator and 1968 presidential candidate
George McGovern
from South Dakota
(1963–1981)

=== Others ===
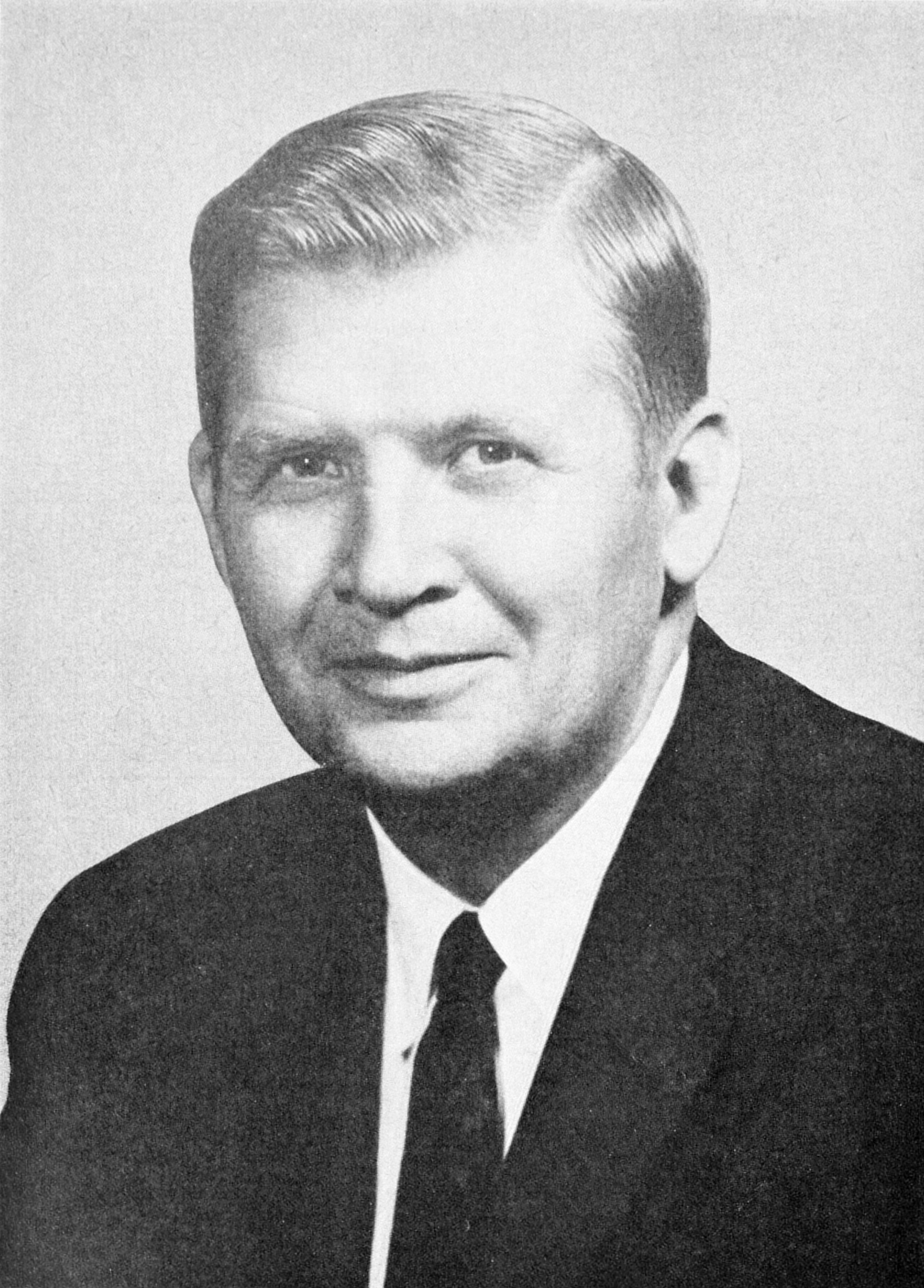
Former Governor
Terry Sanford
of North Carolina
(1961–1965)

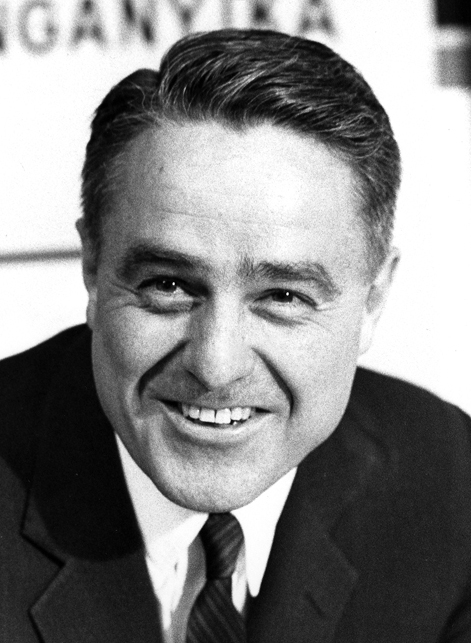
Ambassador to France
Sargent Shriver
from Maryland
(1968–1970)

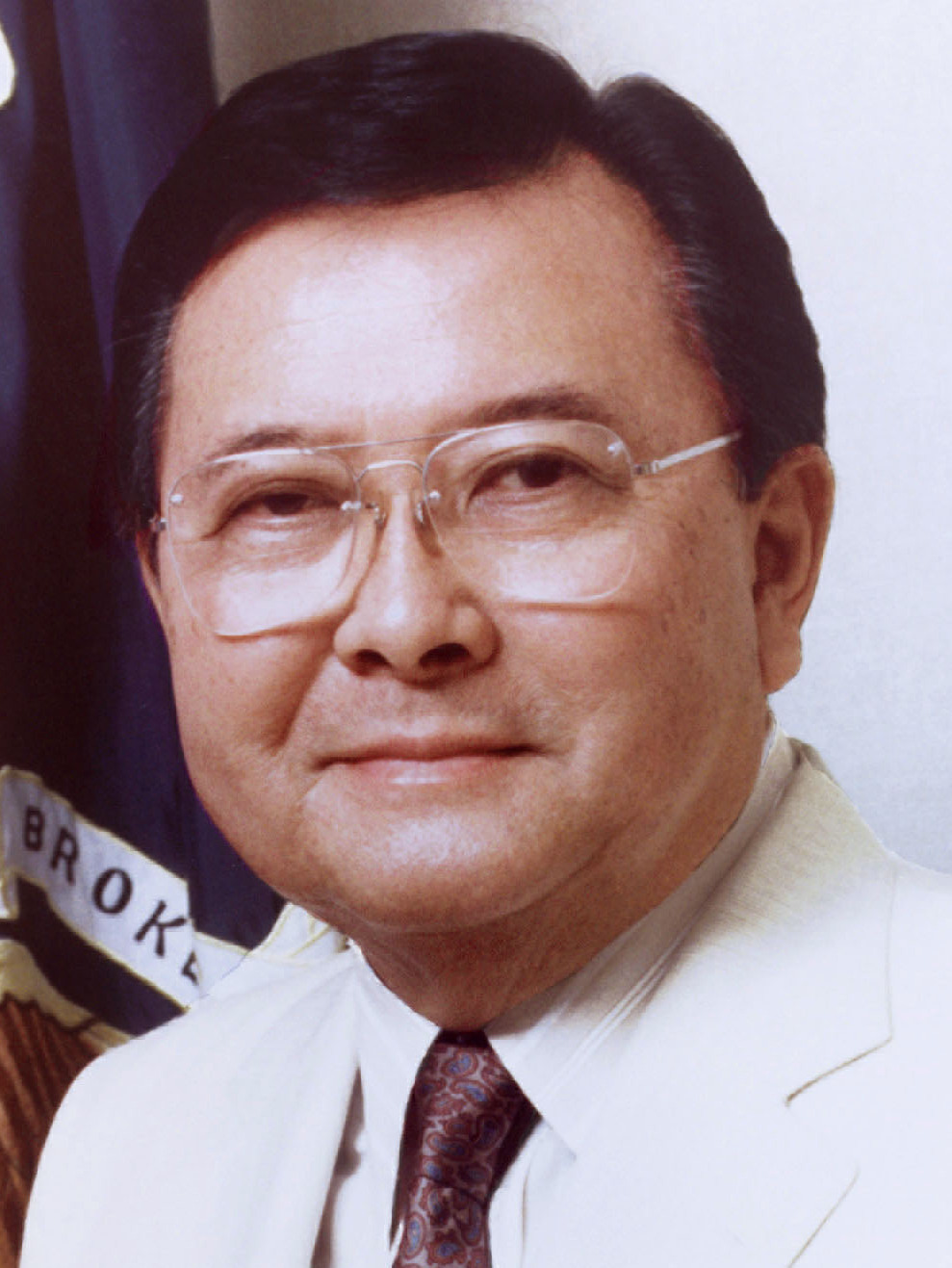
Senator
Daniel Inouye
from Hawaii
(1963–2012)

== Results ==
1968 Democratic vice presidential balloting
Contender: ballot	Final tally
Senator Edmund Muskie	1942.5
Not voting	604.25
Activist Julian Bond	48.5
David Hoeh	4
Senator Ted Kennedy	3.5
Senator Eugene McCarthy	3
Don Edwards	2
Senator Abraham Ribicoff	2
Senator George McGovern	2
Mayor Richard J. Daley	1.5
Governor Robert Evander McNair	1.5
Philadelphia Mayor James Tate	1.5
Representative Allard K. Lowenstein	1
Senate nominee Paul O'Dwyer	1
Representative Henry S. Reuss	1
Former Governor Terry Sanford	1
Ambassador Sargent Shriver	1
William Fitts Ryan	1
Former Governor George Wallace	0.5

Source: Keating Holland, "All the Votes... Really," CNN

== See also ==
- 1968 Democratic National Convention
- Democratic Party presidential primaries, 1968
