= United States v. Young =

United States v. Young may refer to:

Cases of the Supreme Court of the United States:

- United States v. Young (1877), 94 U.S. 258 (1877)
- United States v. Young (1914), 232 U.S. 155 (1914)
- United States v. Young (1985), 470 U.S. 1 (1985)

== See also ==
- Lists of United States Supreme Court cases
