= Clarice Reid =

American pediatrician

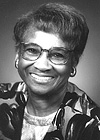
- Dr. Clarice Reid on her retirement from the National Heart, Lung, and Blood Institute (NHLBI), National Institutes of Health (NIH).
- Born: Clarice D. Reid; 1931 (age 94–95); Birmingham, Alabama
- Education: Talladega College; University of Cincinnati College of Medicine
- Known for: Sickle Cell Disease; Oversaw the National Sickle Cell Disease Program at the National Heart, Lung, and Blood Institute for over 20 years; Only African-American pediatrician in Cincinnati from 1962-1968
- Scientific career
- Fields: Pediatrician; Director of the Division of Blood Diseases and Resources (DBDR), the National Heart, Lung, and Blood Institute
- Workplaces: Jewish Hospital, Cincinnati Children's Hospital, Cincinnati; National Center for Family Planning, Health Services and Mental Health Administration National Heart, Lung and Blood Institute

Clarice D. Reid (born 1931) is an American pediatrician born in Birmingham, Alabama, who led the National Sickle Cell Disease Program at the U.S. National Heart, Lung, and Blood Institute (NHLBI) at the National Institutes of Health. She went on to become the Director of Division of Blood Diseases and Resources at NHLBI. Reid was a member of the 1985-1986 Taskforce on Black and Minority Health. She has also served as President Emeritus on the American Bridge Association's Education and Charitable Foundation, and has scored a rare perfect bridge score.

== Education ==
Clarice Reid was born in Birmingham, Alabama in 1931. After attending a three-room elementary school in Birmingham, Alabama and the city's only high school for African American students, Reid went on to follow in her father's footsteps by attending Talladega College in Alabama. She began a course of study to become a medical technician before changing to medical school to become a physician at Meharry Medical College, in Nashville, Tennessee. Her husband got a job in Cincinnati, so she completed her medical training at University of Cincinnati College of Medicine, the third African American woman to gain an MD there. She is a mother of four children. In 1970, she moved to the DC area.

== Professional career ==
Dr. Reid completed residencies at Jewish Hospital and Children's Hospital Medical Center in Cincinnati before opening a private practice as a pediatrician. She later became Director of Pediatric Education before chairing the Pediatric Department at Jewish Hospital. After moving to the D.C. area, she first joined the National Center for Family Planning, Health Services and Mental Health Administration as a medical consultant before joining the National Sickle Cell Disease Program at the National Heart, Lung, and Blood Institute in 1973.

Reid was a member of the 1985–86 Task Force on Black and Minority Health for the U.S. Government, which was commissioned by Margaret Heckler and known as the "Heckler Report" and led to the establishment of the Office of Minority Health. In 1988, she retired as the director of the Division of Blood Diseases and Resources (DBDR), in the National Heart, Lung, and Blood Institute, after 26 years of federal service. She facilitated collaboration between researchers in the sickle cell anemia community and advances in understanding sickle cell disease.

== Awards and honors ==
- Superior Service Award, the highest honor given by the U.S. Public Health Service, 1989
- NIH Director's Award
- NIH MERIT Award
- Two Public Health Service and Special Recognition Awards
- The Presidential Meritorious Executive Rank Award, 1991
- Sickle Cell Disease Association of America (SCDAA) Clarice D. Reid, M.D. Lecture in her honor
- Recognition in the "NIH Women Making History" program
- One of Black Enterprise magazine's "America's Ten Leading Black Doctors"
- Designated a "Distinguished Woman" by the Black Women in Scholarship for Action
- Included in the Book of Black Heroes, Volume II: Great Women in the Struggle, which salutes eighty-four accomplished black women in the arts, sciences, education, athletics, government and social services
