= Fellers v. United States =

- Supreme Court of the United States

Argued December 10, 2003 Decided January 26, 2004
- Full case name: John J. Fellers, Petitioner v. United States
- Citations: 540 U.S. 519 (more) 124 S. Ct. 1019; 157 L. Ed. 2d 1016; 2004 U.S. LEXIS 825

Case history
- Prior: United States v. Fellers, 285 F.3d 721 (8th Cir. 2002); cert. granted, 538 U.S. 905 (2003).

Holding
- The Eighth Circuit erred in holding that the absence of an "interrogation" foreclosed petitioner's claim that his jailhouse statements should have been suppressed as fruits of the statements taken from him at his home.

Court membership
- Chief Justice William Rehnquist Associate Justices John P. Stevens · Sandra Day O'Connor; Antonin Scalia · Anthony Kennedy; David Souter · Clarence Thomas; Ruth Bader Ginsburg · Stephen Breyer

Case opinion
- Majority: O'Connor, joined by unanimous

Fellers v. United States, 540 U.S. 519 (2004), is a United States Supreme Court case regarding the Sixth Amendment's right to counsel.

== Facts ==
After John Fellers was indicted on February 24, 2000, by a grand jury, a police sergeant named Michael Garnett and a deputy sheriff named Jeff Bliemeister from the Lincoln, Nebraska Police Department and the Lancaster County Sheriff's Office respectively, came to his home to arrest him. When they came to his house, they knocked on the door and identified themselves. They requested to enter his house, and Fellers invited them to his living room. When the officers went into the living room, they advised him that they were here to question him on his involvement in a methamphetamine distribution conspiracy, a federal crime. During the discussion, the officers informed him that he had a warrant for his arrest and was indicted by a grand jury. The conspiracy charge was related to his association with four named individuals and many unknown suspects. Fellers told the officers that he knew that the four individuals used methamphetamine during his association. Fifteen minutes later, Fellers was formally arrested and transported to the Lancaster County Jail. It was only at this time that he was read his Miranda rights. A waiver form was signed, the statements were reiterated, and Fellers admitted that he had loaned money to a female individual, even though he suspected that she was involved in drug transactions.

=== Trials and Appeals ===
At a pre-trial hearing, Fellers moved to suppress the statements he made to the officers from evidence. During the hearing, the magistrate in charge of the case recommended that portions of Fellers' statements, including the statement he made at his house, should be suppressed as fruits of the poisonous tree. The District Court subsequently suppressed the statement made during the initial confrontation, but admitted the jailhouse statement into evidence, arguing that under Oregon v. Elstad, Fellers knowingly and voluntarily waived his Miranda rights before making the statement. At the actual trial itself, Fellers was convicted by a jury for conspiracy to possess with intent to distribute methamphetamine. Fellers appealed, arguing that the statement made in the jailhouse should be suppressed just like the statement at the house as a violation of the Sixth Amendment. The United States Court of Appeals for the Eighth Circuit affirmed the initial verdict, concluding,

Fellers argues that the district court should have suppressed his inculpatory statements made at the jail because the primary taint of the improperly elicited statements made at his home was not removed by the recitation of his Miranda rights at the jail.

The voluntariness of a confession is a legal inquiry subject to plenary appellate review. United States v. Robinson, 20 F.3d 320, 322 (8th Cir.1994). To determine if Fellers's inculpatory statements at the jail were voluntary, we must determine if, "in light of the totality of the circumstances, the pressures exerted by the authorities overwhelmed the defendant's will. Coercive police activity is a necessary predicate to finding that a confession is not voluntary in the constitutional sense." Id. (citing Colorado v. Connelly, 479 U.S. 157, 167, 107 S. Ct. 515, 93 L. Ed. 2d 473 (1986)) (internal citation omitted).

Contrary to Fellers's contention otherwise, we conclude that Oregon v. Elstad, 470 U.S. 298, 105 S. Ct. 1285, 84 L. Ed. 2d 222 (1985), renders admissible the statements made by Fellers at the jail.

In that case, two officers went to Elstad's residence with a warrant to arrest him for the burglary of a neighbor's home. One of the officers told Elstad that he believed that Elstad had been involved in the burglary, whereupon Elstad responded "Yes, I was there." The officers then transported Elstad to the sheriff's office, where, approximately one hour later, they advised Elstad of his Miranda rights. Elstad indicated that he understood his rights and that he wished to waive them. Elstad then signed a written statement explaining his role in the burglary. The trial court suppressed Elstad's initial oral statement, but admitted his written confession. Id. at 300-302, 105 S.Ct. 1285. In holding that the statement given at the sheriff's office was admissible, the Court stated:

It [would be] an unwarranted extension of Miranda to hold that simple failure to administer the warnings, unaccompanied by any actual coercion or other circumstances calculated to undermine the suspect's ability to exercise his free will, so taints the investigatory process that a subsequent voluntary and informed waiver is ineffective for some indeterminate period. Though Miranda requires that the unwarned admission must be suppressed, the admissibility of any subsequent statement should turn in these circumstances solely on whether it is knowingly and voluntarily made.

Elstad, 470 U.S. at 309, 105 S.Ct. 1285. Citing Patterson v. Illinois, 487 U.S. 285, 108 S. Ct. 2389, 101 L. Ed. 2d 261 (1988), Fellers argues that the officers' failure to administer the Miranda warnings at his home violated his sixth amendment right to counsel inasmuch as the encounter constituted a post-indictment interview. Patterson is not applicable here, however, for the officers did not interrogate Fellers at his home.

Finally, we conclude that the record amply supports the district court's finding that Fellers's jailhouse statements were knowingly and voluntarily made following the administration of the Miranda warning. See Elstad, 470 U.S. at 314-15, 105 S.Ct. 1285; Robinson, 20 F.3d at 322. Accordingly, the district court did not err in denying the motion to suppress the statements made at the jail."

Judge Riley concurred, writing,

In all respects but one, I concur in the Court's well-reasoned opinion. My disagreement, which does not affect the ultimate resolution of this case, concerns whether the arresting officers violated Fellers's right to counsel under the Sixth Amendment.

Because Fellers was under indictment at the time of his arrest, he had a constitutional right to the presence of counsel during police interrogation. Massiah v. United States, 377 U.S. 201, 205-06, 84 S.Ct. 1199, 12 L. Ed. 2d 246 (1964). For purposes of this right, an interrogation takes place when agents of law enforcement deliberately attempt to elicit incriminating information from the indicted defendant. See id. at 206, 84 S. Ct. 1199. Although the officers in this case did not ask Fellers any questions, they deliberately elicited incriminating information by telling Fellers they wanted to discuss his involvement in the use and distribution of methamphetamine. This post-indictment conduct outside the presence of counsel violated Fellers's right to counsel under the Sixth Amendment. See United States v. Henry, 447 U.S. 264, 270-71, 100 S.Ct. 2183, 65 L. Ed. 2d 115 (1980); Brewer v. Williams, 430 U.S. 387, 399-401, 97 S. Ct. 1232, 51 L. Ed. 2d 424 (1977); cf. Rhode Island v. Innis, 446 U.S. 291, 300-02 & 300 n. 4, 100 S.Ct. 1682, 64 L. Ed. 2d 297 (1980).

Nevertheless, I do not believe this constitutional violation takes Fellers's case outside the rationale of Oregon v. Elstad, 470 U.S. 298, 105 S.Ct. 1285, 84 L. Ed. 2d 222 (1985). The Supreme Court "has never held that the psychological impact of voluntary disclosure of a guilty secret ... compromises the voluntariness of a subsequent informed waiver." Id. at 312, 105 S.Ct. 1285. Fellers knowingly and voluntarily waived his Sixth Amendment rights at the jail, and his subsequent statements were thus admissible at his criminal trial. Accordingly, I concur in the judgment of the Court."

== Holding ==
In a unanimous decision written by Justice Sandra Day O'Connor, the Supreme Court held that the 8th Circuit Court of Appeals had erred in their decision that an "absence of an interrogation" had foreclosed Fellers' claim that the jailhouse statement should have been suppressed. While there was no question that incriminating statements were "deliberately elicited" at the house, the fact that Fellers was formally indicted and the statements in the house were without presence of counsel and there was an absence of a Sixth Amendment waiver, meant that the Court of Appeals made an error in their decision that the officers' actions did not violate the Sixth Amendment. Secondly, the Court of Appeals improperly analyzed the "fruits of the poisonous tree" under the Fifth Amendment. Specifically, it relied on Oregon v. Elstad to hold that the jailhouse statement was admissible under the notion that it was "knowingly and voluntarily made". The Court of Appeals did not consider the question of whether the jailhouse statement should be suppressed on the grounds that they were the fruits of the statement made at the house. The question of whether Oregon v. Elstead should apply notwithstanding earlier questioning that violated a suspect's rights was not looked into at the Court, leading to the case to be remanded back into the Court of Appeals.

== See also ==
- List of United States Supreme Court cases, volume 540
- List of United States Supreme Court cases
