= Shon Hopwood =

American law professor and former bank robber

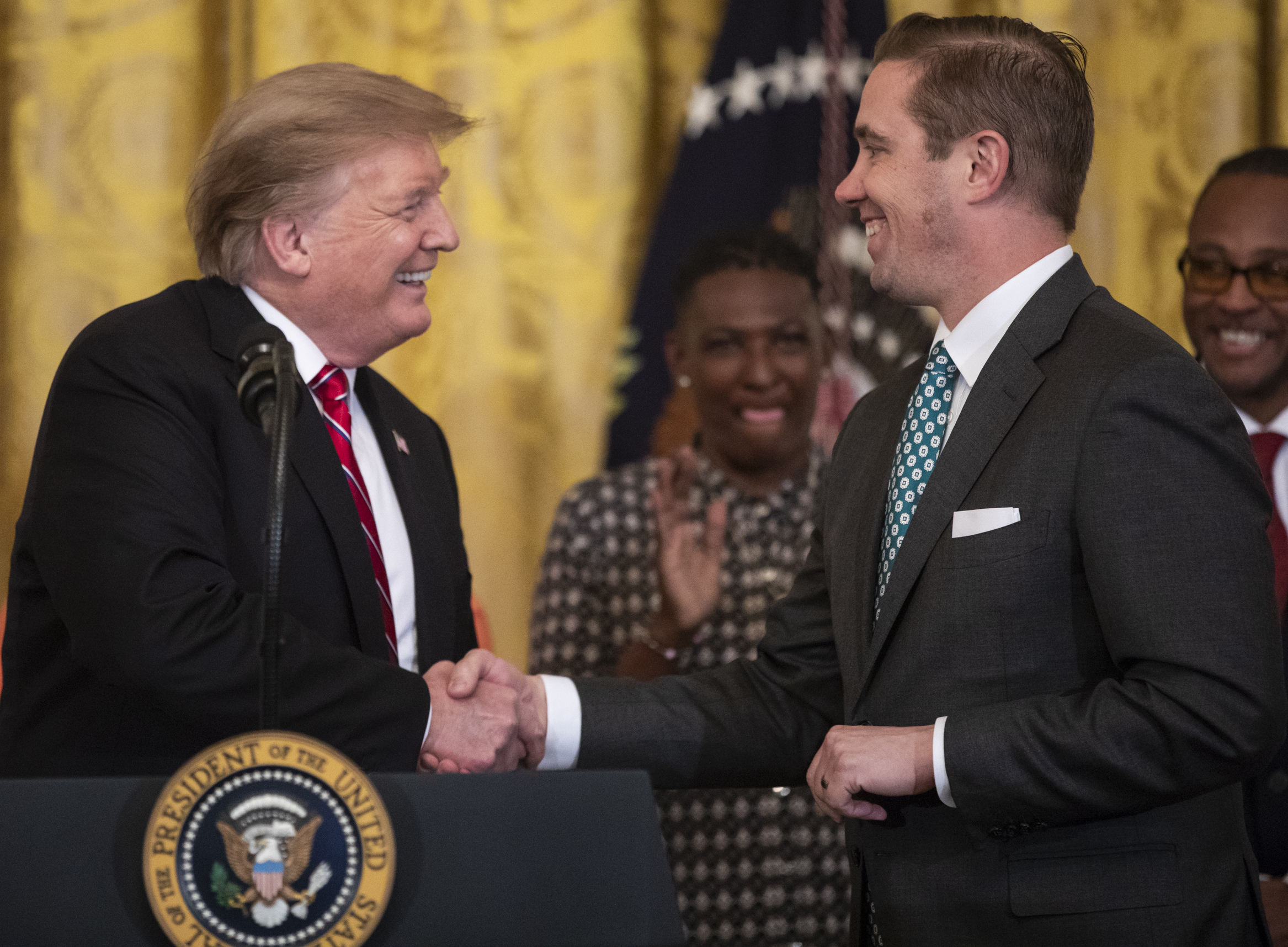
- Hopwood (right) shaking hands with President Donald Trump at the White House in 2019
- Born: Shon Robert Hopwood; June 11, 1975 (age 51); David City, Nebraska, U.S.
- Education: Bellevue University (BS); University of Washington (JD); Georgetown University (LLM)
- Occupation: Law professor
- Notable work: Petition for writ of certiorari in Fellers v. United States; Law Man: My Story of Robbing Banks, Winning Supreme Court Cases, and Finding Redemption
- Spouse: Ann Marie Metzner
- Children: 2

Shon Robert Hopwood (born June 11, 1975) is a suspended American appellate lawyer. He became well-known as a jailhouse lawyer who served time in prison for bank robbery. While in prison, he started spending time in the law library, and became an accomplished United States Supreme Court practitioner by the time he left in 2009. On July 18, 2025, he was found guilty of 10 counts of assault and domestic violence-related crimes.

== Early life ==
Hopwood is the son of Robert Mark Hopwood and Becky Richards, who raised him in a Christian home. He grew up in David City, Nebraska, approximately an hour's drive northwest of Lincoln, Nebraska. Hopwood is the eldest of five siblings. Hopwood excelled on standardized tests. He was a high school basketball standout, earning himself a scholarship to Midland University in Fremont, Nebraska. After Hopwood realized he was a mediocre talent in basketball, he became disillusioned and did not go to classes.

After leaving school, Hopwood joined the United States Navy. He was stationed in the Persian Gulf. While in the Navy, Hopwood guarded warships with shoulder-mounted Stinger missiles. He almost died from acute pancreatitis in a Bahrain hospital, which prompted his discharge from the Navy.

=== Bank robbery ===
Hopwood pleaded guilty on October 28, 1998, to robbing several banks in Nebraska. Federal judge Richard G. Kopf of the U.S. District Court for the District of Nebraska sentenced Hopwood to 12 years and three months in prison, followed by three years of supervised release and ordered $134,544 in restitution. Kopf was stunned by Hopwood's later transformation, saying, "my gut told me that [he] was a punk—all mouth, and very little else. My viscera was wrong." In Kopf's own opinion, "Hopwood proves that my sentencing instincts suck."

=== Jailhouse lawyer ===
Hopwood served his prison sentence at Federal Correctional Institution, Pekin. While at Pekin, he spent five weeks in solitary confinement, and criticized the practice once he got out.

Hopwood aided another prisoner in writing a petition for certiorari in 2002. The Supreme Court agreed to hear his case, Fellers v. United States. The court, in a 9–0 decision, found that police had acted unconstitutionally in questioning Fellers.

He also won honorable mention in the PEN American Center 2008 Prison Writing contest.

Hopwood was released from the custody of the Bureau of Prisons on April 9, 2009.

== Law school and legal career ==
Hopwood holds a Bachelor of Science from Bellevue University in Bellevue, Nebraska, and a Juris Doctor from the University of Washington School of Law, where he was a Gates Public Service Law Scholar. He served as a law clerk for Judge Janice Rogers Brown of the United States Court of Appeals for the District of Columbia Circuit after he graduated from law school.

On September 4, 2014, the Supreme Court of Washington approved the recommendation made by the Character and Fitness Committee of the Washington State Bar Association, permitting Hopwood to take the Washington bar examination, and to become an attorney if he passed. His ability to become of a member of the Washington State Bar Association was named one of the National Law Journal's 14 memorable Supreme Court of the United States stories of 2014. In 2015, Hopwood became a licensed lawyer in the state of Washington. As of October 18, 2025, his Washington license is suspended for nonpayment of fees. His license in the District of Columbia is also suspended as of October 18, 2025. The District of Columbia Court of Appeals Board of Professional Responsibility recommended on December 22, 2025 that he be disbarred in the event that he is sentenced and the conviction upheld on appeal.

In 2015, Hopwood accepted a position as a graduate teaching fellow in Georgetown University Law Center's Appellate Litigation Clinic, where he was pursuing a Master of Laws degree. In 2017, Hopwood became a professor of law at Georgetown. He hired 2020 Georgetown Law graduate Tiffany Trump as his research assistant.

He has not been teaching since his September 2023 domestic violence arrest. As of October 18, 2025, his name does not appear in the employee directory of Georgetown University.

== Domestic violence conviction ==
In September 2023, Hopwood was arrested for allegedly assaulting his wife. He was charged with four counts of misdemeanor assault, and the court granted him pretrial release. In August 2024, the U.S. Attorney's Office for the District of Columbia filed felony charges against Hopwood: two counts of obstructing justice, and five counts of contempt for violating his release conditions.

On July 18, 2025, Jeanine Pirro, Interim U.S. Attorney for the District of Columbia, held a press conference to announce that Hopwood was found guilty on ten out of eleven counts - two counts of obstructing justice, five counts of contempt, and three counts of simple assault.

== Writings and views ==
Hopwood's memoir, Law Man: My Story of Robbing Banks, Winning Supreme Court Cases, and Finding Redemption, co-written with Dennis Burke, was published in August 2012. In the memoir, Hopwood details both his life as a jailhouse lawyer and his romance with his wife, Ann Marie Hopwood, to whom Hopwood wrote during eight years of his imprisonment. Law Man received critical acclaim from a number of book reviewers.

Hopwood is a criminal justice advocate, and he has written about the need for federal sentencing and prison reform. Hopwood told an ACLU event that his home state of Nebraska should reform sentencing guidelines for prisoners, keep good time credits and not build a new prison.

=== Contributions to scholarly journals ===
- Clarity in Criminal Law, American Criminal Law Review (2016)
- Seasonal Affective Disorder: Clerk Training and the Success of Supreme Court Certiorari Petitions
- The Not So Speedy Trial Act, 89 Wash. L. Rev. 709 (2014)
- Preface: Failing to Fix Sentencing Mistakes: How the System of Mass Incarceration May Have Hardened the Hearts of the Federal Judiciary, 43 Geo. L.J. Ann. Rev. Crim. Proc. iii (2014)
- Slicing Through the Great Legal Gordian Knot: Ways to Assist Pro Se Litigants in Their Quest for Justice, 80 Fordham L. Rev. 1229 (2011)
- A Sunny Deposition: How the in Forma Pauperis Statute Provides an Avenue for Indigent Prisoners to Seek Depositions Without Accompanying Fees, 46 Harv. C.R.-C.L. L. Rev. 195 (2011)
- From a Prison Law Library to the New York Times, Informal Opinion, Champion, November 2010

== In the media ==
Hopwood has been profiled by The New York Times, NPR, and other media. He was featured on a 60 Minutes segment in 2017 and repeated in 2019, where he was interviewed by Steve Kroft.
