= Margaret Heckler =

American politician (1931–2018)

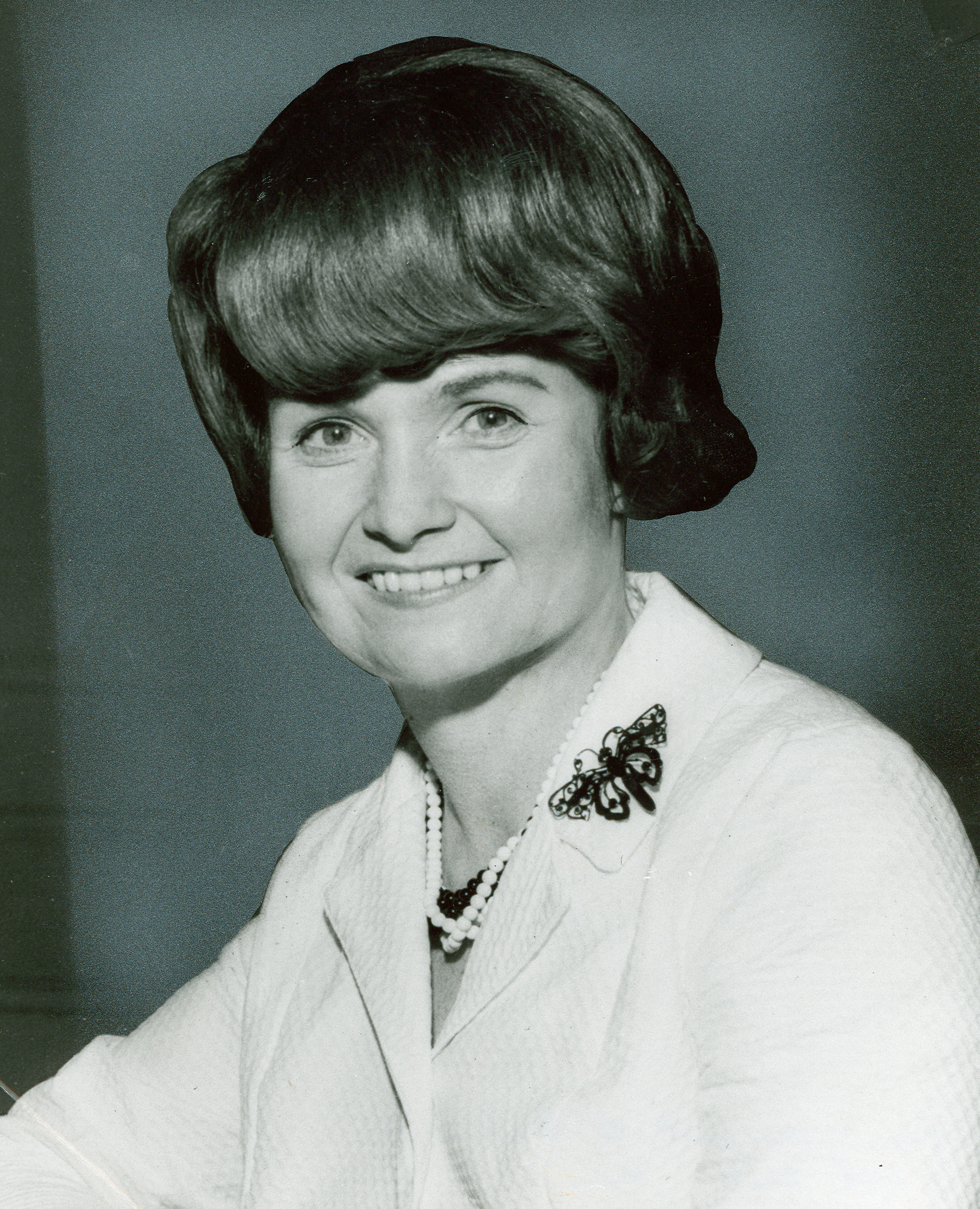

United States Ambassador to Ireland
- In office January 30, 1986 – August 20, 1989
- President: Ronald Reagan; George H. W. Bush
- Preceded by: Robert F. Kane
- Succeeded by: Richard A. Moore

15th United States Secretary of Health and Human Services
- In office March 10, 1983 – December 13, 1985
- President: Ronald Reagan
- Preceded by: Richard Schweiker
- Succeeded by: Otis Bowen

Member of the U.S. House of Representatives from Massachusetts's 10th district
- In office January 3, 1967 – January 3, 1983
- Preceded by: Joe Martin
- Succeeded by: Gerry Studds

Member of the Massachusetts Governor's Council from the 2nd district
- In office January 3, 1963 – January 3, 1967
- Governor: Endicott Peabody; John Volpe
- Preceded by: Alvin Tamkin
- Succeeded by: John J. Craven Jr.

Personal details
- Born: Margaret Mary O'Shaughnessy; June 21, 1931 New York City, U.S.
- Died: August 6, 2018 (aged 87) Arlington, Virginia, U.S.
- Party: Republican
- Spouse: John Heckler (m. 1954; div. 1985)
- Children: 3
- Education: Albertus Magnus College (BA); Boston College (LLB)
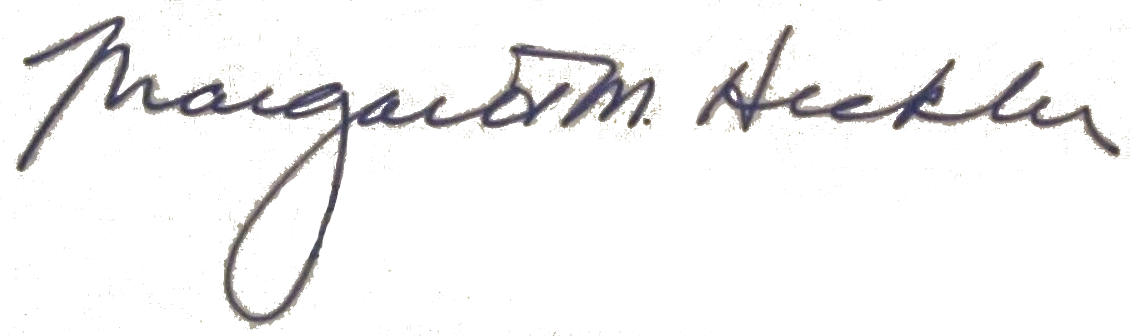
- Signature

Margaret Mary Heckler (née O'Shaughnessy; June 21, 1931 – August 6, 2018) was an American politician and diplomat who represented Massachusetts's 10th congressional district in the United States House of Representatives from 1967 until 1983. A member of the Republican Party, she also served as the 15th United States secretary of health and human services from 1983 to 1985, as well as United States ambassador to Ireland from 1986 to 1989.

== Early life ==
She was born Margaret Mary O'Shaughnessy in Flushing, New York. Her undergraduate studies began at Albertus Magnus in New Haven, Connecticut. She then studied abroad at the University of Leiden, in the Netherlands, in 1952 and went on to graduate from Albertus Magnus College (B.A. 1953) and from Boston College Law School (LL.B. 1956). She was the only woman in her law school class. She was admitted to the bar in Massachusetts. She was an editor of the Annual Survey of Massachusetts Law.

From 1963 to 1967, Heckler served on the governor's council for the Commonwealth of Massachusetts, was a delegate to the Republican National Convention in 1964 and 1968, and was elected as a Republican from the 90th to the 97th Congresses (January 3, 1967 – January 3, 1983).

Heckler received an honorary doctorate from Johnson & Wales University in 1975.

== Congressional career ==
In 1967, when she was first elected, Heckler was one of only 11 women in Congress. She supported moderate to liberal policies favored by voters in her state of Massachusetts. Heckler voted in favor of the Civil Rights Act of 1968. In 1972 she co-sponsored Title IX, which required that no person, on the basis of sex, could be discriminated against under any education program or activity receiving federal financial assistance. In 1974, as a member of the Banking and Currency Committee, Heckler authored the Equal Credit Opportunity Act, giving women the right to seek credit in their own names for the first time in American history. In 1977, she launched and co-founded the Congresswoman's Caucus, a bipartisan group of 14 members focused on equality for women in Social Security, tax laws, and related areas. It was the first all-women's caucus in the Congress. Heckler was also an outspoken advocate for and co-sponsor of the Equal Rights Amendment. At the Republican National Convention in 1980, Heckler urged then presidential nominee Ronald Reagan to put the first woman on the Supreme Court. Heckler had a fierce passion for women's equality.

In Massachusetts, she was noted for building an especially-effective network of constituent services that allowed her to triumph through several re-election bids in an overwhelmingly-Democratic state. In the capital, Heckler was noted as a socialite with a penchant for high fashion.

In the House, she served on the Banking and Currency Committee (1968-1974) and served as ranking member of the Veterans' Affairs Committee (1967–1982). She also served on the Agriculture Committee (1975-1980) and the Joint Economic Committee (1975-1982).

=== Electoral history ===
Heckler won her first term in 1966 by defeating 42-year incumbent Republican Joseph W. Martin Jr., in the primary. Martin, then 82, had previously served as Speaker of the House and was 46 years older than Heckler. She was the first woman representative to Congress from Massachusetts elected in her own right. Heckler won the subsequent general election with just 51 percent of the vote. She went on to be re-elected seven more times.

Following the 1980 census, Massachusetts lost one of its congressional seats because of its population growth. Heckler's district, then the only one in Massachusetts large enough to not need redistricting, was combined with that of freshman Democratic Representative Barney Frank. The district was numerically Frank's district, the 4th, but it was geographically more Heckler's district. When both ran against each other in 1982, Heckler began the race as a frontrunner. Although she opposed Reagan on 43 percent of House votes, Frank successfully portrayed Heckler as a Reagan ally by pointing to her early support for his tax cuts, which she later retracted. She went on to lose the race by a larger-than-expected margin of 20%. After her defeat, no woman would be elected to Congress from Massachusetts until Niki Tsongas won a special election in 2007.

== Health and Human Services Secretary ==
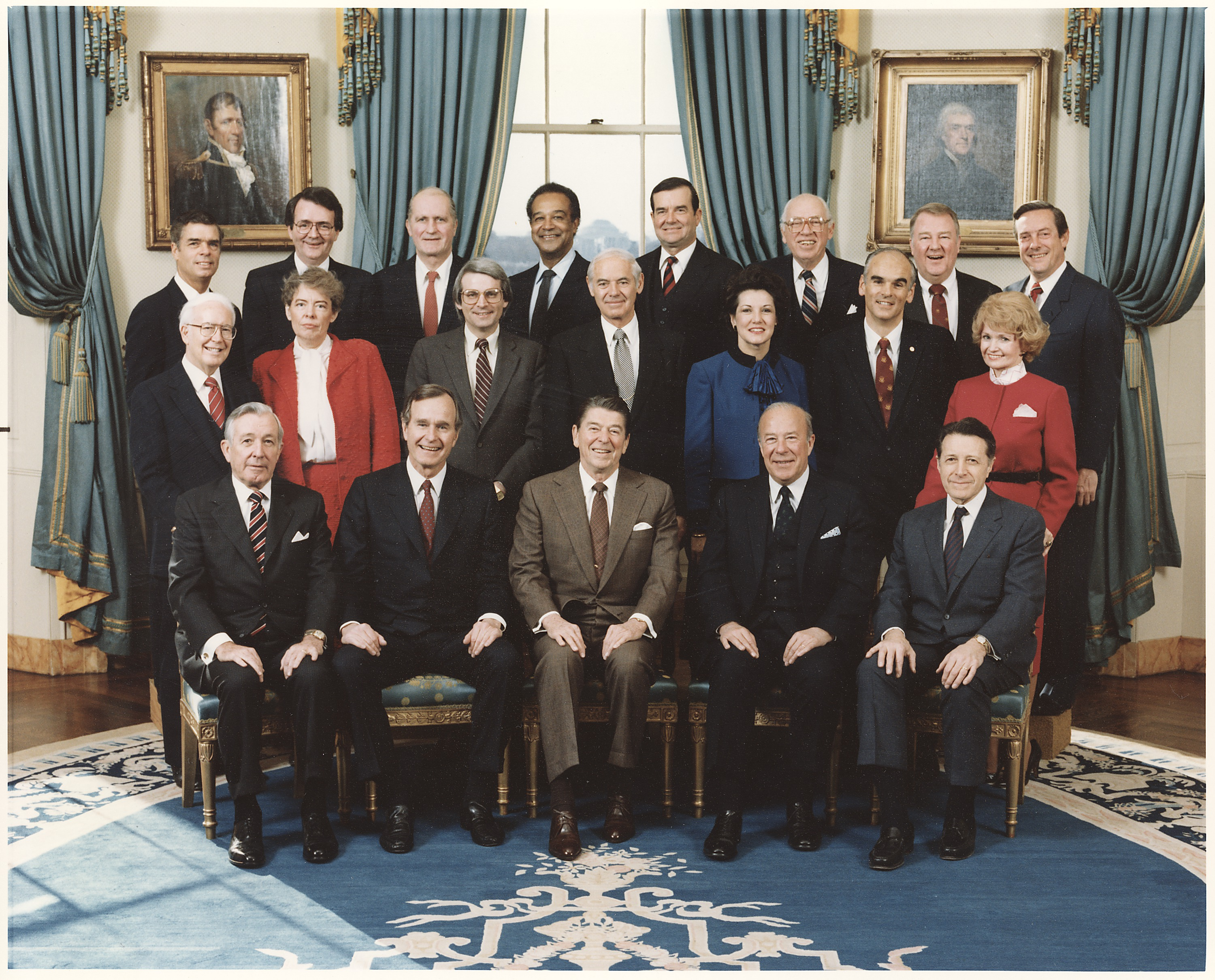
Heckler, second row on the far right, with the Reagan Cabinet in 1984

After her defeat, Heckler turned down several high profile government jobs, including Secretary of the Treasury, before Reagan nominated her to replace retiring Health and Human Services Secretary Richard Schweiker in January 1983. She was confirmed on March 3, 1983 by an 82-3 vote in the Senate.

Early on as Secretary of HHS, Heckler commissioned the Secretarial Task Force to investigate a "sad and significant fact: there was a continuing disparity in the burden of death and illness experienced by Blacks and other minority Americans as compared with our nation's population as a whole," as she put it in her opening letter in The Secretary's Report on Black and Minority Health, also known as the Heckler Report. The report provided the historical foundation for many reports thereafter and is often referenced as the landmark document for health disparity and health equity inquiry. Clarice Reid was a member of the task force that helped to produce the report. She went on to establish the Office of Minority Health.

As secretary, Heckler supported the Reagan administration's more conservative views, presided over staffing cuts in the department as part of the administration's spending reductions, and frequently spoke on a wide array of public health issues, including the emerging AIDS crisis. Although it was very difficult for her to get the topic of AIDS on the Cabinet meeting agendas, Heckler established AIDS as the number one health priority in America.

Heckler repeatedly assured the American public that the nation's blood supply was "100% safe... for both the hemophiliac who requires large transfusions and for the average citizen who might need it for surgery." To try to calm the hysteria surrounding the crisis, Heckler donated blood and shook hands with AIDS patients.

On January 21, 1985, Heckler became the first woman to be named designated survivor. She served in the role during Reagan's second inauguration.

=== Public divorce saga ===
Heckler's tenure as secretary was also marked by scandal in the Washington press when her husband, John, filed for divorce in 1984. The episode was tinged by election-year concerns over the impact of the divorce on conservative voters and dragged on for months as the couple argued whether Massachusetts or Virginia, to where she had moved, had jurisdiction in the case.

=== Departure from Cabinet ===
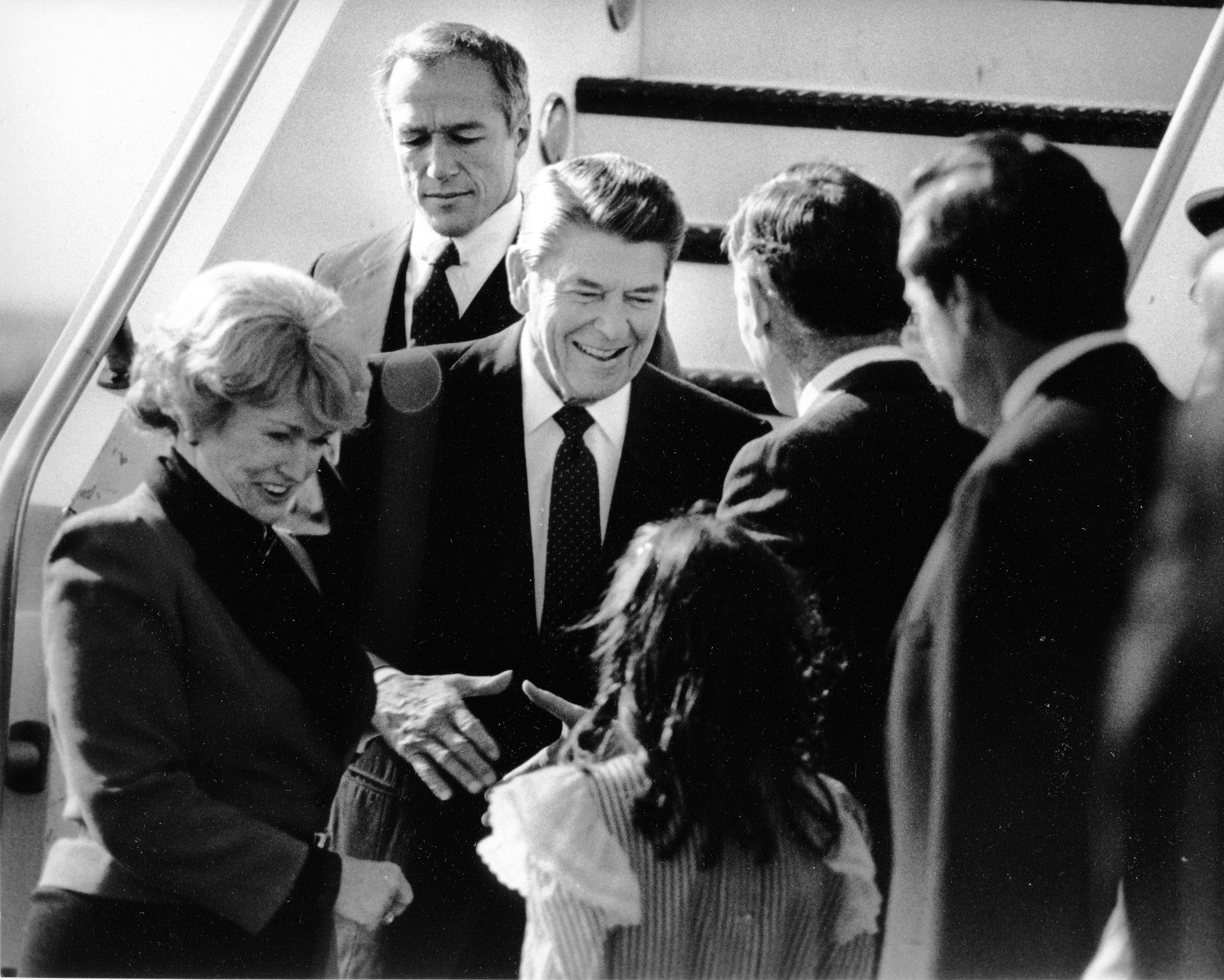
Heckler (at left), with Ronald Reagan meeting Mayor of Boston Raymond Flynn (c. 1984–1985)

Following the 1984 presidential election, White House chief of staff Donald Regan pressured Reagan, empowered by a landslide victory, to nominate Heckler as Ambassador to Ireland in November 1985. Heckler was confirmed by the Senate in a voice vote in December 1985.

== Ambassador to Ireland ==
As ambassador, Heckler played a crucial role in obtaining a US$120 million grant to the International Fund for Ireland, an economic development organization. She was a frequent guest on Irish television programs and was "by all accounts an effective spokesperson for her government's policies on everything from Central America to international trade." In February 1989, Heckler announced her intent to resign to pursue a private career, and her term concluded in August 1989.

On May 31, 1987, Heckler became the first woman to deliver the commencement address in the history of the University of Scranton. Heckler's papers are housed in the Burns Library at Boston College.

== Death ==
Heckler died at Virginia Hospital Center in Arlington, Virginia, on August 6, 2018, at the age of 87.

== See also ==
- List of female United States Cabinet members
- Women in the United States House of Representatives
- Heckler v. Chaney

== Sources ==
- Jane Anderson. "Two Massachusetts Incumbents Fight for Single Seat in Congress." Miami Herald, October 17, 1982, pg. 5D.
- Karen DeYoung. "Margaret Heckler, All Emerald Smiles", Washington Post, March 18, 1987, pg. D1.
- David Hoffman. "Heckler Offered Irish Ambassadorship", Washington Post, October 1, 1985, pg. A1.
- Stephanie Mansfield. "The Heckler Breakup", Washington Post, October 16, 1984, pg. B1.
- Donnie Radcliffe. "The Women's Caucus", Washington Post, April 27, 1978, pg. B12.
- Spencer Rich. "Heckler's Administrative Skills Called Inadequate for Agency", Washington Post, October 1, 1985, pg. A1.
- Myron Stuck and Sarah Fitzgerald. "Senate Confirms Heckler." Washington Post. 03/04/1983. p. A13.

U.S. House of Representatives
Preceded by Joe Martin	Member of the U.S. House of Representatives from Massachusetts's 10th congressional district 1967–1983	Succeeded by Gerry Studds
Political offices
Preceded by Richard Schweiker	United States Secretary of Health and Human Services; 1983–1985	Succeeded by Otis Bowen
Diplomatic posts
Preceded by Robert F. Kane	United States Ambassador to Ireland; 1986–1989	Succeeded by Richard A. Moore
