= Metropolitan Life Insurance Co. v. Ward =

Metropolitan Life Ins. Co. v. Ward
- Supreme Court of the United States

Argued October 31, 1984 Decided March 26, 1985
- Full case name: Metropolitan Life Insurance Co. et al. v. Ward et al.
- Citations: 470 U.S. 869 (more) 105 S.Ct. 1676; 84 L. Ed. 2d 751; 1984 U.S. LEXIS 26; 53 U.S.L.W. 4399; 1985 U.S. LEXIS 80

Case history
- Prior: 437 So.2d 535, Court of Civil Appeals of Alabama. 447 So.2d 142, Supreme Court of Alabama, cert denied. 466 U.S. 935, 104 S.Ct. 1905, 466 U.S. 935, US Supreme Court, probable jurisdiction noted.
- Subsequent: 479 So.2d 41, Supreme Court of Alabama, reversed and remanded 447 So.2d 142 in light of case. 479 So.2d 41, Court of Civil Appeals of Alabama, reversed and remanded 437 So.2d 535 in light of case.

Holding
- The promotion of domestic business within state was not legitimate state purpose, and encouraging investment of domestic assets and securities in discriminatory manner served no legitimate state purpose.

Court membership
- Chief Justice Warren E. Burger Associate Justices William J. Brennan Jr. · Byron White; Thurgood Marshall · Harry Blackmun; Lewis F. Powell Jr. · William Rehnquist; John P. Stevens · Sandra Day O'Connor

Case opinions
- Majority: Powell, joined by Burger, White, Blackmun, Stevens
- Dissent: O'Connor, joined by Brennan, Marshall, Rehnquist

Laws applied
- U.S. Const. Art. IV, § 2, cl. 1

Metropolitan Life Insurance Co. v. Ward, 470 U.S. 869 (1985), was a case in which the Supreme Court of the United States held that a state cannot tax out-of-state insurance companies at a greater rate than domestic insurance companies under the Privileges and Immunities Clause of Article Four of the United States Constitution.

== Facts and procedural history ==
Alabama passed a law which imposed greatly lower gross premiums tax rate on Alabama-based insurance companies than on out-of-state or foreign insurance companies. The statute permitted these out-of-state companies to invest in Alabama assets and securities, which could reduce (though not eliminate) the higher tax. Out-of-state insurance companies brought claims for refunds of taxes paid. They argued that the tax plan violated the Equal Protection Clause of the US Constitution. The State Commissioner of Insurance denied the claims. Alabama's court of first instance upheld the statute on summary judgment, finding that the statute did not violate the Equal Protection Clause. The Court reasoned that, among the legitimate state purposes are encouraging the formation of new insurance companies in Alabama and capital investment by foreign insurance companies in Alabama assets and securities, not to mention raising revenue via taxation. Thus, the distinction between foreign and domestic companies which was rationally related to those purposes, was acceptable. After two appeals, the Supreme Court of Alabama upheld these findings, and the case was brought to the United States Supreme Court.

== Supreme Court ==
Justice Powell, writing for the 5-4 majority, held two things. First, under the circumstances of the case, promotion of domestic business by discriminating against nonresidents is not a legitimate state purpose. The Court here distinguished this case from Western & Southern Life Ins. Co. v. State Board of Equalization of California. The law had no purpose but to burden foreign businesses for the benefit of Alabama businesses. This was, according to the Court, exactly the sort of behavior the Equal Protection Clause was written to prohibit. A state may not incur a higher tax on a business solely based on the state of one's residence. The Court noted that while the McCarran-Ferguson Act did take the insurance industry outside the purview of Commerce Clause restrictions, that did not extend to the Equal Protection Clause. While the doctrines are related, the Act did not stop both.

Second, promotion of investing in Alabama industry was a legitimate state interest. All insurance companies, domestic and foreign, were entitled to the tax breaks for the investment credits. However, because investment credits could not eliminate, but only lessen the tax burden on foreign insurance companies, this further demonstrated the unconstitutionality of Alabama's tax scheme.

=== Dissenting opinion ===
Justice O'Connor wrote a dissent joined by Justices Brennan, Marshall, and Rehnquist. It argued that promoting domestic industry was a legitimate state interest, and the tax scheme was related to this purpose.

== See also ==
- List of United States Supreme Court cases by the Burger Court
