= Missouri v. Seibert =

- Supreme Court of the United States

Argued December 9, 2003 Decided June 28, 2004
- Full case name: Missouri, Petitioner v. Patrice Seibert
- Citations: 542 U.S. 600 (more) 124 S. Ct. 2601; 159 L. Ed. 2d 643; 2004 U.S. LEXIS 4578; 72 U.S.L.W. 4634; 2004 Fla. L. Weekly Fed. S 476

Case history
- Prior: Defendant convicted of second-degree murder, Circuit Court, Pulaski County; affirmed, State v. Seibert, 2002 WL 114804 (Mo. App. S.D.); reversed and remanded for a new trial, State v. Seibert, 93 S.W.3d 700 (Mo. 2002); cert. granted, Missouri v. Seibert, 538 U.S. 1031 (2004).

Holding
- Missouri's practice of interrogating suspects without reading them a Miranda warning, then reading them a Miranda warning and asking them to repeat their confession is unconstitutional.

Court membership
- Chief Justice William Rehnquist Associate Justices John P. Stevens · Sandra Day O'Connor; Antonin Scalia · Anthony Kennedy; David Souter · Clarence Thomas; Ruth Bader Ginsburg · Stephen Breyer

Case opinions
- Plurality: Souter, joined by Stevens, Ginsburg, Breyer
- Concurrence: Breyer
- Concurrence: Kennedy (in judgment)
- Dissent: O’Connor, joined by Rehnquist, Scalia, Thomas

Laws applied
- U.S. Const. amends. V, XIV

Missouri v. Seibert, 542 U.S. 600 (2004), is a decision by the Supreme Court of the United States that struck down the police practice of first obtaining an inadmissible confession without giving Miranda warnings, then issuing the warnings, and then obtaining a second confession. Justice David Souter announced the judgment of the Court and wrote for a plurality of four justices that the second confession was admissible only if the intermediate Miranda warnings were "effective enough to accomplish their object." Justice Anthony Kennedy wrote in a concurring opinion that the second confession should be inadmissible only if "the two-step interrogation technique was used in a calculated way to undermine the Miranda warning."

== Background ==
Patrice Seibert, a suspect in a fatal arson, was arrested and taken to the police station. There, a police officer decided to interrogate her using a method he had been taught: to question the suspect, obtain a confession, then give Miranda warnings and repeat the questioning until the confession was obtained again. Accordingly, Seibert was not informed of her Miranda rights before the interrogation began. After about 40 minutes of questioning, Seibert made an incriminating statement. She was given a 20-minute break. When the questioning resumed, she was given her Miranda warnings, and reminded of what she had admitted before the break. She then repeated her confession.

The trial court (Missouri Circuit Court) suppressed the first statement because it was given before the Miranda warnings, but admitted the second. Seibert was convicted of second-degree murder. The Supreme Court granted certiorari to resolve a split among the Circuit Courts of Appeal on this issue.

== Plurality opinion ==
Souter, writing for the plurality, focused on the actual effectiveness of Miranda warnings given after an earlier unwarned confession. Just giving the warnings is not necessarily good enough. Instead, a court must ask, "Could the warnings effectively advise the suspect that he had a real choice about giving an admissible statement at that juncture? Could they reasonably convey that he could choose to stop talking even if he had talked earlier?"

The plurality opinion gives some guidance on when an intermediate warning should be considered to be effective. Such a warning is likely to mislead a defendant about his rights when it is made "in the midst of coordinated and continuing interrogation." Courts should therefore consider "the completeness and detail of the questions and answers in the first round of interrogation, the overlapping content of the two statements, the timing and setting of the first and the second, the continuity of police personnel, and the degree to which the interrogator's questions treated the second round as continuous with the first."

== Concurrences ==
Justice Breyer concurred. He set forth a different test for whether the second confession should be admissible: "Courts should exclude the 'fruit' of the initial unwarned questioning unless the failure to warn was in good faith." The term "fruit" refers to the fruit of the poisonous tree doctrine, which provides that in criminal trials, courts may not admit evidence obtained as an indirect result of a search that violated the Fourth Amendment. Justice Breyer's proposed rule would extend that doctrine to evidence obtained as an indirect result of an interrogation that violated the Fifth Amendment. Although this test was different from Justice Souter's, Breyer also joined with the Souter's plurality opinion because he thought that the two tests would yield the same result in practice.

Justice Kennedy also concurred, and proposed yet another test. He wrote that he "would apply a narrower test applicable only in the infrequent case, such as we have here, in which the two-step interrogation technique was used in a calculated way to undermine the Miranda warning." If a two-step procedure was deliberately used, the subsequent statement would be inadmissible unless the police "cured" the problem by taking measures that would enable the suspect to distinguish the first interrogation from the second "and appreciate that the interrogation has taken a new turn." Kennedy suggested that a long break between the two interrogations would usually be sufficient, as would an explanation to the suspect that the first statement would probably be inadmissible in court.

== Dissent ==
Justice O'Connor wrote for the dissent. She criticized the majority for not being faithful to the Court's earlier opinions involving two-stage interrogations, especially Oregon v. Elstad, a 1985 case involving a two-stage interrogation. The dissent stated that under the precedent of Elstad, it did not matter whether the police failed to give Miranda warnings before the first confession, so long as the confession was not coerced. Even if the first confession were coerced, "the court must examine whether the taint dissipated through the passing of time or a change in circumstances." To make that determination, O'Connor would have courts look to many of the same factual considerations identified by the plurality: "the time that passes between confessions, the change in place of interrogations, and the change in identity of the interrogators."

The dissent would thus have allowed police to continue to use the question-first, warn-later approach, so long as they could show that the first confession was voluntary and that the "taint" of the first confession had worn off.

== Effect ==
Seibert was a split decision. The general rule is that when there is no majority opinion in a Supreme Court case, the narrowest rationale agreed upon by at least five Justices controls. But lower courts have disagreed about what that rationale is in Seibert: some have adopted the "effects" test from the plurality opinion; others have adopted the "intent" test from Kennedy's opinion. As Gerald Uelmen has written, "The fractured opinions" in Seibert "have left lower courts in limbo." Midstream Miranda Warnings After Seibert, Champion, July, 2005.

According to Justice Souter's opinion, the two-step interrogation practice was becoming increasingly popular among police departments. Given the confusion about Seibert's meaning, it remains to be seen whether that changes.

In State v. O'Neill, 936 A.2d 438, 193 N.J. 148 (2007), the New Jersey Supreme court determined that based on New Jersey's greater protections than the US Constitution, that question first, mirandize later was not constitutional. While an "entirety of the circumstances" test still applies, O'Neill essentially held that the test is failed by this particular interrogation process.
