= Cochrane v. Deener =

- Supreme Court of the United States

Decided March 19, 1877
- Full case name: Cochrane v. Deener
- Citations: 94 U.S. 780 (more) 24 L. Ed. 139; 1876 U.S. LEXIS 1942; 4 Otto 780

Holding
- A process that transforms grain meal into purified flour is patentable.

Court membership
- Chief Justice Morrison Waite Associate Justices Nathan Clifford · Noah H. Swayne; Samuel F. Miller · Stephen J. Field; William Strong · Joseph P. Bradley; Ward Hunt

Case opinions
- Majority: Bradley, joined by Waite, Swayne, Miller, Davis, Field, Hunt
- Dissent: Clifford, joined by Strong

Cochrane v. Deener, 94 U.S. 780 (1876), was a United States Supreme Court case in which the Court held that a process transforming grain meal into purified flour was patentable. This decision provided significant guidance on the patentability of processes and helped to shape the understanding of what constitutes a patentable invention in the United States.

In this case, the plaintiff, Cochrane, alleged that Deener infringed on his patented process for manufacturing purified flour. Deener argued that the patent was invalid because the process was not a patentable subject matter. The case ultimately reached the Supreme Court, which was tasked with determining whether the process in question was eligible for patent protection.

Justice Bradley, writing for the majority, established the principle that a process could be patentable if it involved a transformation or reduction of an article to a different state or thing. The Court found that Cochrane's process, which involved the application of mechanical and chemical operations to remove impurities from grain meal and produce purified flour, met this requirement.

The Court's decision in Cochrane v. Deener clarified the scope of patentable subject matter, specifically with regard to processes. By establishing that processes involving transformations of matter were eligible for patent protection, the Court significantly expanded the range of innovations that could be patented. This case remains an important precedent in the field of patent law and serves as a foundational example of the patentability of processes.
