= United States v. Sharpe =

- Supreme Court of the United States

Argued November 27, 1984 Decided March 20, 1985
- Full case name: United States v. William Harris Sharpe and Donald Davis Savage
- Citations: 470 U.S. 675 (more) 105 S. Ct. 1568; 84 L. Ed. 2d 605
- Argument: Oral argument

Case history
- Prior: Sharpe v. United States, 660 F.2d 967 (4th Cir. 1981); Cert. granted, judgment vacated, 457 U.S. 1127 (1982); Original opinion readopted as modified, 712 F.2d 65 (4th Cir. 1983); Cert. granted, 467 U.S. 1250 (1984)

Court membership
- Chief Justice Warren E. Burger Associate Justices William J. Brennan Jr. · Byron White; Thurgood Marshall · Harry Blackmun; Lewis F. Powell Jr. · William Rehnquist; John P. Stevens · Sandra Day O'Connor

Case opinions
- Majority: Burger, joined by White, Blackmun, Powell, Rehnquist, O'Connor
- Concurrence: Blackmun
- Concurrence: Marshall
- Dissent: Brennan
- Dissent: Stevens

Laws applied
- U.S. Const. amend. IV

United States v. Sharpe, 470 U.S. 675 (1985), was a legal case in which the Supreme Court of the United States clarified how long police are permitted to stop vehicles as part of an investigatory stop before it violates the Fourth Amendment to the U.S. Constitution.

On June 9, 1978, two cars, a Pontiac Bonneville driven by William Sharpe and a pickup truck with a camper driven by Donald Savage, arose the suspicion of an agent with the Drug Enforcement Administration (DEA). When the agent tried to stop both vehicles for an investigative stop, the vehicles split up. The agent stopped the Pontiac while another agent stopped the pickup truck further down the road. The agent kept Sharpe stopped for about 20 minutes while the other officers interrogated Savage. After officers determined Savage had broken the law, the agent arrested Sharpe ten minutes later, 30 minutes after the initial stop.

Sharpe accused the agent of violating the Fourth Amendment's prohibition of "unreasonable search and seizure", arguing that the stop was unduly prolonged prior to his arrest. On appeal to the U.S. Supreme Court, a seven-justice majority determined the twenty minute stop in this case was legal. However, the Court declined to adopt a bright line rule, deciding instead that "common sense and ordinary human experience must govern over rigid criteria". The Court announced that the rule for determining whether a detention is too long will depend on whether the police "diligently pursued" an investigation to quickly confirm or dispel their suspicions. The Court clarified that judges should avoid "unrealistic second-guessing" of police and should take into account "swiftly developing situation[s]." Sharpe has been frequently cited, and is the framework used to challenge unduly prolonged police stops in thousands of criminal cases.

== Background ==
Agent Cooke was a Drug Enforcement Administration (DEA) agent, patrolling a coastal road near Sunset Beach, North Carolina on the morning of June 9, 1978. At 6:30 AM, he spotted a Pontiac Bonneville and a pickup truck with a camper attached driving in tandem on the highway. Sharpe was driving the Pontiac, and a man named Savage was driving the pickup truck. Agent Cooke noticed that the truck was riding low in the rear, and the camper did not bounce or sway when the truck maneuvered over bumps and around curves. So, Agent Cooke suspected the camper was heavily loaded. Agent Cooke also noticed a quilted material covered the rear and side windows of the camper. With suspicions aroused, Agent Cooke followed the two vehicles for twenty miles.

Agent Cooke chose to make an investigative stop and radioed the State Highway Patrol for assistance. Together, the two officers attempted to stop both vehicles. Both vehicles turned onto a campground road, exceeding the speed limit by twenty to twenty-five miles. Agent Cooke pulled over Sharpe in his Pontiac, but as he did so, Savage - while driving the pickup truck - nearly collided with the state highway patrol officer and continued down the highway with the camper in tow. The highway patrol officer continued pursuing Savage in the pickup truck while Agent Cooke approached Sharpe in the Pontiac.

=== Actions During the Stop ===
Agent Cooke asked Sharpe for identification then radioed the highway patrolman to determine if he had successfully stopped the pickup truck. However, the patrolman was not in the patrol car, so it took several minutes to confirm. Agent Cooke radioed the local police for assistance, and two officers from the Myrtle Beach Police Department arrived about 10 minutes later. Agent Cooke asked the Myrtle Beach PD to maintain the situation, then left to join the highway patrol officer who had successfully stopped the pickup truck one-half mile down the road.

Agent Cooke arrived at the pickup truck about 15 minutes after it had been stopped. Agent Cooke twice asked for permission to search the camper, but Savage declined. Agent Cooke, however confirmed that the camper was overloaded with weight and smelled marijuana when he put his nose against the rear window. Based on this, Agent Cooke opened the trailer and observed large bales of marijuana in the camper. At this point, Agent Cooke arrested Savage. From the time Agent Cooke initially stopped the vehicles until the arrest of Savage, twenty minutes had passed.

=== Aftermath ===
Agent Cooke returned to the Pontiac and arrested Sharpe 30–40 minutes after the initial stop. That evening, other DEA agents took the truck to a federal building in South Carolina. Several days later, Agent Cooke supervised the unloading of 2,629 pounds of marijuana. Sharpe and Savage were charged with possession of a controlled substance with intent to distribute it in violation of 21 U.S.C. Section 841(a)(1) and 18 U.S.C. Section 2.

=== Legal Issue ===
The key issue the Supreme Court had to decide was whether the stop was unduly prolonged before the police had probable cause to arrest Savage. Specifically, the Supreme Court had to decide whether the twenty minutes that passed from the time Savage was pulled over until the moment Agent Cooke smelled the marijuana was an unjustified amount of time for the police to stop someone without probable cause of a crime.

== Decision ==
On March 20, 1985, the Supreme Court issued a 7–2 decision in favor of the United States that reversed the judgement of the Fourth Circuit Court of Appeals and reinstated the convictions of Savage and Sharpe. Chief Justice Burger delivered the opinion of the Court.

=== Opinion of the Court ===
==== Precedent and Legal Context ====
The Court noted at the onset that it need not decide whether Agent Cooke had reasonable articulable suspicion to initiate the traffic stop. The Court of Appeals had assumed that portion of the analysis, and the Court noted that assumption was "abundantly supported by the record."

Next, the Court set aside the 30 - 40-minute detention of Sharpe as irrelevant to the legal analysis. That was because the Defendants were trying to suppress the discovery of the marijuana, but the marijuana was discovered as part of Savage's detention not Sharpe's detention. Therefore, it was only the 20-minute detention of Savage that was legally relevant to the Court.

The Court primarily discussed four cases as precedent for its decision: Terry v. Ohio, Dunaway v. New York, Florida v. Royer, and United States v. Place. Terry v. Ohio was the foundational case that established the doctrine of "Terry Stops." Terry was relevant here because the case requires that any police investigatory stop be "reasonably related in scope to the circumstances which justified the interference in the first place." It's from this requirement in Terry, that a stop can be unreasonably delayed by exceeding the scope that justified the stop in the first place. The Court distinguished Dunaway and Royer because those were cases where the police, without probable cause for arrest, took suspects to police stations or to small rooms for questioning. The Court decided this vehicle stop was legally distinct. In Place, however, a 90-minute seizure of a suspect's luggage was deemed unreasonably long in the absence of probable cause. But the Supreme Court focused on language in the Place decision that stated the analysis was partly about "whether the police diligently pursue their investigation."

==== Rule and Analysis ====
The Supreme Court stated it would not draw a "bright line" rule but instead would rely on "common sense and ordinary human experience" instead over "rigid criteria." Specifically, the Court stated that:

"In assessing whether a detention is too long in duration to be justified as an investigative stop, we consider it appropriate to examine whether the police diligently pursued a means of investigation that was likely to confirm or dispel their suspicions quickly, during which time it was necessary to detain the defendant."

The Supreme Court stated that courts conducting this analysis "should take care to consider whether the police are acting in a swiftly developing situation" and courts "should not indulge in unrealistic second-guessing." They added this caution out of a concern for creative judges engaging in post hoc evaluation of police conduct who could always imagine some alternative means by which the police could have conducted the investigation in hindsight. But the Supreme Court clarified that the question is not simply whether some alternative investigation decision was available, but instead "whether the police acted unreasonably in failing to recognize or to pursue it.

The Supreme Court rejected the argument that a 20-minute stop is automatically unreasonable when the police were diligent and when a suspect's actions contribute to the added delay. Quoting Place, the Court noted that police officers are permitted to "graduate [their] response to the demands of particular situation[s]."

==== Applied to the Case ====
Given the circumstances facing him, the Supreme Court determined Agent Cooke pursued his investigation in a "diligent and reasonable manner." During most of the 20-minute detention of Savage, Agent Cooke was trying to contact the highway patrol officer and trying to enlist help of local police to guard Sharpe while Agent Cooke left to pursue Savage and the pickup truck. Once Agent Cooke reached Savage, the Court concluded he proceeded expeditiously because, within a few minutes, he examined Savage's driver's license, examined the truck bill of sale, requested permission to search the truck, stepped on the rear bumper (confirming his suspicion the truck was overloaded), then smelled the marijuana.

The Court noted that the Defendants were not able to provide any evidence the officers were dilatory or unnecessary delayed the investigation. And the Court noted that the delay in the case was attributable "almost entirely to the evasive actions of Savage" when he sought to elude police, resulting in the one-half mile gap between the two vehicles.

=== Justice Blackmun Concurrence ===
Justice Blackmun wrote separately, stating he would have remanded the case back to the Court of Appeals to dismiss the Defendants' argument because the Defendants failed to surrender to state authorities. Thus, as fugitives from justice, the appeal should have been dismissed. He cited Molinaro v. New Jersey, as support for this reasoning. Yet, because the Court did not follow that path and instead chose to decide the case on the merits, Justice Blackmun joined the majority opinion.

=== Justice Marshall Concurrence ===
Justice Marshall joined only the result of the case. He joined because the evasive actions of Savage turned "what otherwise would have been a permissibly brief Terry stop into the prolonged encounter now at issue." Justice Marshall, however, wrote separately to emphasize the importance of Terry's brevity requirement to the constitutionality of Terry stops. Justice Marshall went on to describe the history of Terry v. Ohio, emphasizing that the underlying rationale of Terry only applied to stops that were "substantially less intrusive than arrests." Justice Marshall worried about "those who rank zealous law enforcement above all other values" abusing the Terry doctrine and using it to justify intrusive behavior.

Justice Marshall proposed a test for Terry stops where the "critical threshold issue is the intrusiveness of the seizure" regardless of how efficient it may be for law enforcement based on the circumstances. Justice Marshall wrote it was important to divorce the "brevity requirement" from law enforcement needs, concerned that law enforcement needs could always justify increasing long stops. Justice Marshall wrote about the difficulty of judging the brevity requirement "by a stopwatch", but was uncomfortable with the Court's open-ended approach, believing that 20 minutes was too long.

Justice Marshall also did not agree with the Court's decision to decide there was sufficient reasonable articulable suspicion. Justice Marshall thought the majority was "so anxious to address an unpresented issue that it blithely hurdle[d] over the jurisdictional and jurisprudential principles that ought to stand in its way". Justice Marshall did not explicitly state whether he thought there was reasonable articulable suspicion, but he disagreed with the Court's decision to assume it without the issue being properly presented and briefed.

=== Justice Brennan Dissent ===
Justice Brennan noted that he had written separately in three of the Court's previous cases involving Terry stops and was much more skeptical on the scope and duration allowed by the Court in its recent cases. He also criticized the Court for choosing this case to expand the Terry doctrine, because he believed, if the majority's description of Savage's evasive maneuvers was accurate, Savage's evasive maneuvers were enough for probable cause the moment he nearly collided with the patrol car. But, at the same time, Justice Brennan criticized the Court's factual finding that Savage actually attempted to elude the police. On his reading of the facts, Justice Brennan noted that other innocent explanations could account for Savage's vehicle maneuvers and ultimately concluded that Savage had not actually attempted to evade.

Justice Brennan also was more willing to question the diligence of the police on the scene. Justice Brennan pointed out that the government provided no explanation why the highway patrolman could not have investigated Savage without needing to wait for Agent Cooke. Justice Brennan also thought that the "poor coordination" between the DEA, local police, and state police should not excuse delays in the investigation. Justice Brennan did not think it should be part of the Constitution's "reasonableness" analysis for an officer to lengthen a detention while waiting for the arrival of an officer with more training and experience, believing that the exception could excuse too much misbehavior.

=== Justice Stevens Dissent ===
Justice Stevens, like Justice Blackmun, thought that the Defendants status as "fugitives" who attempted to escape law enforcement should be the central analysis of the case. Justice Stevens thought the procedural question about escaped persons was the more important legal issue that needed to be resolved, especially because escapes by persons engaged in smuggling narcotics was not uncommon. Justice Stevens thought the Defendants' attempt to escape should have mooted the appeal, therefore making it unnecessary for the Supreme Court to even decide the constitutional question.

== Effect and legacy ==
United States v. Sharpe has been cited by thousands of cases and is part of the legal analysis in almost any investigative stop. However, the Terry doctrine broadly has continued to expand after the Sharpe decision, drawing some criticism. A Terry stop is the legal justification for police tactics like "stop and frisk", the application of which has been controversial to some. Sharpe specifically focused on the length of Terry stops, whereas much of the controversy focuses on other parts of the Terry framework, like use of force and legality of certain "frisk" tactics.

David Moran has criticized the legal framework of traffic violation stops, the broader analysis that Sharpe contributes to. He suggests the entire analogy of routine traffic violations to Terry stops is unnecessarily confusing and the Court should instead adopt a new category of "non-custodial arrests." This, Moran argues, will lessen the centrality of the ambiguous time during which police only have authority to detain for a petty offense but nonetheless keep suspects detained.
