= United States v. Gagnon =

- Supreme Court of the United States

Decided March 18, 1985
- Full case name: United States v. Gagnon
- Citations: 470 U.S. 522 (more)

Holding
- A criminal defendant's rights under the Fifth Amendment Due Process Clause were not violated by the in camera discussion between the judge and a juror.

Court membership
- Chief Justice Warren E. Burger Associate Justices William J. Brennan Jr. · Byron White; Thurgood Marshall · Harry Blackmun; Lewis F. Powell Jr. · William Rehnquist; John P. Stevens · Sandra Day O'Connor

Case opinion
- Per curiam

Laws applied
- Due Process Clause

United States v. Gagnon, 470 U.S. 522 (1985), was a United States Supreme Court case in which the Court held that a criminal defendant's rights under the Fifth Amendment Due Process Clause were not violated by the in camera discussion between the judge and a juror. A defendant has the right to be present at any stage of the trial where the fairness of the proceeding would be impeded by their absence.
