= List of United States Supreme Court cases, volume 232 =

Supreme Court of the United States
- Interactive map of Supreme Court of the United States
- 38°53′26″N 77°00′16″W
- Established: March 4, 1789; 236 years ago
- Location: Washington, D.C.
- Coordinates: 38°53′26″N 77°00′16″W
- Composition method: Presidential nomination with Senate confirmation
- Authorised by: Constitution of the United States, Art. III, § 1
- Judge term length: life tenure, subject to impeachment and removal
- Number of positions: 9 (by statute)
- Website: supremecourt.gov

This is a list of cases reported in volume 232 of United States Reports, decided by the Supreme Court of the United States in 1914.

== Justices of the Supreme Court at the time of volume 232 U.S. ==
The Supreme Court is established by Article III, Section 1 of the Constitution of the United States, which says: "The judicial Power of the United States, shall be vested in one supreme Court . . .". The size of the Court is not specified; the Constitution leaves it to Congress to set the number of justices. Under the Judiciary Act of 1789 Congress originally fixed the number of justices at six (one chief justice and five associate justices). Since 1789 Congress has varied the size of the Court from six to seven, nine, ten, and back to nine justices (always including one chief justice).

When the cases in volume 232 were decided the Court comprised the following nine members:

Portrait	Justice	Office	Home State	Succeeded	Date confirmed by the Senate (Vote)	Tenure on Supreme Court
	Edward Douglass White	Chief Justice	Louisiana	Melville Fuller	December 12, 1910 (Acclamation)	December 19, 1910 – May 19, 1921 (Died)
	Joseph McKenna	Associate Justice	California	Stephen Johnson Field	January 21, 1898 (Acclamation)	January 26, 1898 – January 5, 1925 (Retired)
	Oliver Wendell Holmes Jr.	Associate Justice	Massachusetts	Horace Gray	December 4, 1902 (Acclamation)	December 8, 1902 – January 12, 1932 (Retired)
	William R. Day	Associate Justice	Ohio	George Shiras Jr.	February 23, 1903 (Acclamation)	March 2, 1903 – November 13, 1922 (Retired)
	Horace Harmon Lurton	Associate Justice	Tennessee	Rufus W. Peckham	December 20, 1909 (Acclamation)	January 3, 1910 – July 12, 1914 (Died)
	Charles Evans Hughes	Associate Justice	New York	David Josiah Brewer	May 2, 1910 (Acclamation)	October 10, 1910 – June 10, 1916 (Resigned)
	Willis Van Devanter	Associate Justice	Wyoming	Edward Douglass White (as Associate Justice)	December 15, 1910 (Acclamation)	January 3, 1911 – June 2, 1937 (Retired)
	Joseph Rucker Lamar	Associate Justice	Georgia	William Henry Moody	December 15, 1910 (Acclamation)	January 3, 1911 – January 2, 1916 (Died)
	Mahlon Pitney	Associate Justice	New Jersey	John Marshall Harlan	March 13, 1912 (50–26)	March 18, 1912 – December 31, 1922 (Resigned)

== Notable Case in 232 U.S. ==
=== Weeks v. United States ===
In Weeks v. United States, 232 U.S. 383 (1914), the Supreme Court held that the warrantless seizure of items from a private residence violates the Fourth Amendment to the U.S. Constitution. It also prevented local officers from securing evidence by means prohibited under the federal exclusionary rule and giving it to their federal colleagues. It was not until the case of Mapp v. Ohio, 367 U.S. 643 (1961), however, that the exclusionary rule was applied to state courts as well.

== Citation style ==
Under the Judiciary Act of 1789 the federal court structure at the time comprised District Courts, which had general trial jurisdiction; Circuit Courts, which had mixed trial and appellate (from the US District Courts) jurisdiction; and the United States Supreme Court, which had appellate jurisdiction over the federal District and Circuit courts—and for certain issues over state courts. The Supreme Court also had limited original jurisdiction (i.e., in which cases could be filed directly with the Supreme Court without first having been heard by a lower federal or state court). There were one or more federal District Courts and/or Circuit Courts in each state, territory, or other geographical region.

The Judiciary Act of 1891 created the United States Courts of Appeals and reassigned the jurisdiction of most routine appeals from the district and circuit courts to these appellate courts. The Act created nine new courts that were originally known as the "United States Circuit Courts of Appeals." The new courts had jurisdiction over most appeals of lower court decisions. The Supreme Court could review either legal issues that a court of appeals certified or decisions of court of appeals by writ of certiorari.

On January 1, 1912, the effective date of the Judicial Code of 1911, the old Circuit Courts were abolished, with their remaining trial court jurisdiction transferred to the U.S. District Courts.

Bluebook citation style is used for case names, citations, and jurisdictions.

- "# Cir." = United States Court of Appeals
  - e.g., "3d Cir." = United States Court of Appeals for the Third Circuit
- "C.C.D." = United States Circuit Court for the District of . . .
  - e.g.,"C.C.D.N.J." = United States Circuit Court for the District of New Jersey
- "D." = United States District Court for the District of . . .
  - e.g.,"D. Mass." = United States District Court for the District of Massachusetts
- "E." = Eastern; "M." = Middle; "N." = Northern; "S." = Southern; "W." = Western
  - e.g.,"C.C.S.D.N.Y." = United States Circuit Court for the Southern District of New York
  - e.g.,"M.D. Ala." = United States District Court for the Middle District of Alabama
- "Ct. Cl." = United States Court of Claims
- The abbreviation of a state's name alone indicates the highest appellate court in that state's judiciary at the time.
  - e.g.,"Pa." = Supreme Court of Pennsylvania
  - e.g.,"Me." = Supreme Judicial Court of Maine

== List of cases in volume 232 U.S. ==
Case Name	Page and year	Opinion of the Court	Concurring opinion(s)	Dissenting opinion(s)	Lower Court	Disposition
Hawley v. City of Malden	1 (1914)	Hughes	none	none	Mass. Super. Ct.	affirmed
Barrett v. City of New York	14 (1914)	Hughes	none	none	C.C.S.D.N.Y.	reversed
Platt v. City of New York	35 (1914)	Hughes	none	none	C.C.S.D.N.Y.	reversed
United States v. Regan	37 (1914)	VanDevanter	none	none	2d Cir.	reversed
Swift v. McPherson	51 (1914)	Lamar	none	none	S.D.	affirmed
National Safe Deposit Company v. Stead, Attorney General of Illinois	58 (1914)	Lamar	none	none	Ill.	affirmed
United States v. Buchanan	72 (1914)	Lamar	none	none	D. Colo.	affirmed
Lapina v. Williams	78 (1914)	Pitney	none	none	2d Cir.	affirmed
Gila Valley, Globe and Northern Railway v. Hall	94 (1914)	Pitney	none	none	Ariz.	affirmed
Bank of Arizona v. Thomas Haverty Company	106 (1914)	Pitney	none	none	Ariz.	affirmed
Ross v. Day	110 (1914)	Pitney	none	none	Cal.	affirmed
Barnes v. Alexander	117 (1914)	Holmes	none	none	Ariz.	affirmed
Cain v. Commercial Publishing Company	124 (1914)	McKenna	none	none	S.D. Miss.	affirmed
Bacon v. Rutland Railroad Company	134 (1914)	Holmes	none	none	D. Vt.	affirmed
Patsone v. Pennsylvania	138 (1914)	Holmes	none	none	Pa.	affirmed
Chesapeake and Ohio Railway Company v. Cockrell	146 (1914)	VanDevanter	none	none	Ky.	affirmed
United States v. Young	155 (1914)	McKenna	none	none	S.D. Ala.	reversed
Burbank v. Ernst	162 (1914)	Holmes	none	none	La.	affirmed
Chicago, Milwaukee and St. Paul Railroad Company v. Polt	165 (1914)	Holmes	none	none	S.D.	reversed
Alabama v. Schmidt	168 (1914)	Holmes	none	none	Ala.	affirmed
Taney v. Penn National Bank	174 (1914)	Hughes	none	none	3d Cir.	affirmed
Chapman and Dewey Lumber Company v. St. Francis Levee District	186 (1914)	VanDevanter	none	none	Ark.	reversed
Atchison, Topeka and Santa Fe Railway Company v. United States	199 (1914)	Lamar	none	none	Comm. Ct.	affirmed
Thomas v. Matthiessen	221 (1914)	Holmes	none	none	2d Cir.	reversed
Miedreich v. Lauenstein	236 (1914)	Day	none	none	Ind.	affirmed
North Carolina Railroad Company v. Zachary	248 (1914)	Pitney	none	none	N.C.	reversed
Billings v. United States	261 (1914)	White	none	none	multiple	affirmed
United States v. Billings	289 (1914)	White	none	none	multiple	affirmed
Pierce v. United States I	290 (1914)	White	none	none	multiple	reversed
Pierce v. United States II	292 (1914)	White	none	none	multiple	reversed
United States v. Goelet	293 (1914)	White	none	none	2d Cir.	certification
United States v. Bennett I	299 (1914)	White	none	none	2d Cir.	certification
United States v. Bennett II	308 (1914)	White	none	none	2d Cir.	certification
Rainey v. United States	310 (1914)	White	none	none	multiple	affirmed
Harrison v. St. Louis and San Francisco Railroad Company	318 (1914)	White	none	none	C.C.W.D. Okla.	affirmed
Baccus v. Louisiana	334 (1914)	White	none	none	La. Dist. Ct.	affirmed
Texas and Pacific Railroad Company v. Louisiana Railroad Commission	338 (1914)	White	none	none	5th Cir.	affirmed
LeRoy Fibre Company v. Chicago, Milwaukee and St. Paul Railroad Company	340 (1914)	McKenna	Holmes (part)	none	8th Cir.	certification
Jones v. St. Louis Land and Cattle Company	355 (1914)	McKenna	none	none	N.M.	reversed
Taylor v. Taylor	363 (1914)	McKenna	none	none	N.Y. Sup. Ct.	reversed
Calaf y Fugurul v. Calaf y Rivera	371 (1914)	Holmes	none	none	P.R.	affirmed
Montoya v. Gonzalez	375 (1914)	Holmes	none	none	N.M.	affirmed
Mitchell Store Building Company v. Carroll	379 (1914)	Day	none	none	6th Cir.	dismissed
Weeks v. United States	383 (1914)	Day	none	none	W.D. Mo.	reversed
United States v. Lexington Mill and Elevator Company	399 (1914)	Day	none	none	8th Cir.	affirmed
Rubber Tire Wheel Company v. Goodyear Tire and Rubber Company	413 (1914)	Hughes	none	none	6th Cir.	reversed
Seim v. Hurd	420 (1914)	Hughes	none	none	2d Cir.	dismissed
Woodward Company v. Hurd	428 (1914)	Hughes	none	none	2d Cir.	certification
Chicago, Milwaukee and St. Paul Railroad Company v. City of Minneapolis	430 (1914)	Hughes	none	none	Minn.	affirmed
United States v. Pelican	442 (1914)	Hughes	none	none	E.D. Wash.	reversed
Gauthier v. Morrison	452 (1914)	VanDevanter	none	none	Wash.	reversed
United States v. Beatty	463 (1914)	VanDevanter	none	none	4th Cir.	dismissed
Thurston v. United States	469 (1914)	VanDevanter	none	none	Ct. Cl.	affirmed
Perrin v. United States	478 (1914)	VanDevanter	none	none	D.S.D.	affirmed
Pronovost v. United States	487 (1914)	VanDevanter	none	none	D. Mont.	dismissed
Chicago, Rock Island and Pacific Railroad Company v. Cramer	490 (1914)	Lamar	none	none	Iowa	reversed
D.E. Foote and Company v. Stanley	494 (1914)	Lamar	none	none	Md.	reversed
Great Northern Railroad Company v. O'Connor	508 (1914)	Lamar	none	none	Minn.	reversed
Farmers and Mechanics Bank of Minneapolis v. Minnesota	516 (1914)	Pitney	none	none	Minn.	reversed
Plymouth Coal Company v. Pennsylvania	531 (1914)	Pitney	none	none	Pa.	affirmed
Atlantic Coast Line Railroad Company v. Goldsboro	548 (1914)	Pitney	none	none	N.C.	affirmed
Wilson v. United States	563 (1914)	Pitney	none	none	N.D. Ill.	affirmed
Weinman v. De Palma	571 (1914)	Pitney	none	none	N.M.	affirmed
Ohio Tax Cases	576 (1914)	Pitney	none	none	S.D. Ohio	affirmed
Paine v. Copper Belle Mining Company	595 (1914)	Holmes	none	none	Ariz.	affirmed
United States ex rel. Brown v. Lane	598 (1914)	White	none	none	D.C. Cir.	dismissed
Young v. Central Railroad of New Jersey	602 (1914)	White	none	none	3d Cir.	affirmed
Priest v. Town of Las Vegas	604 (1914)	McKenna	none	none	N.M.	affirmed
Williamson v. Osenton	619 (1914)	Holmes	none	none	4th Cir.	certification
Chicago, Milwaukee and St. Paul Railroad Company v. Kennedy	626 (1914)	White	none	none	S.D.	reversed
Porto Rico (sic) v. Ramos	627 (1914)	McKenna	none	none	D.P.R.	affirmed
Curriden v. Middleton	633 (1914)	Holmes	none	none	D.C. Cir.	affirmed
Holt v. Henley	637 (1914)	Holmes	none	none	4th Cir.	reversed
Garland v. Washington	642 (1914)	Day	none	none	Wash.	affirmed
Grant Brothers Construction Company v. United States	647 (1914)	VanDevanter	none	none	Ariz.	affirmed
Stewart v. Michigan	665 (1914)	White	none	none	Mich.	reversed
Riley v. Massachusetts	671 (1914)	McKenna	none	none	Mass. Super. Ct.	affirmed
Missouri, Kansas and Texas Railway Company v. West	682 (1914)	McKenna	none	none	Okla.	dismissed
Santa Fe Central Railway Company v. Friday	694 (1914)	Holmes	none	none	N.M.	affirmed
Eberle v. Michigan	700 (1914)	Lamar	none	none	Mich.	affirmed
Schuyler v. Littlefield	707 (1914)	Lamar	none	none	2d Cir.	affirmed
