= Heckler Report =

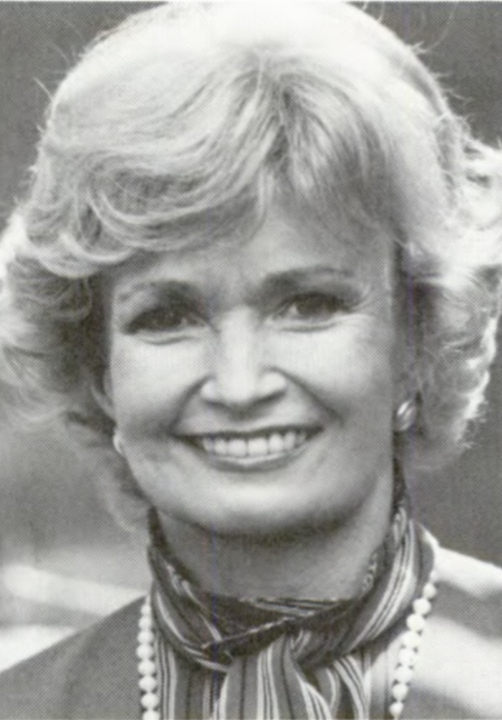
Margaret Heckler, pictured in 1985

The Heckler Report, officially the Report of the Secretary's Task Force on Black and Minority Health, was a landmark 1985 report published by the US Government. It is named after Margaret Heckler, who was Secretary of the Department of Health and Human Services from 1983 to 1985. The Heckler Report investigated racial and ethnic disparities in health in the United States.

== History ==
In 1977, the Association of Minority Health Professions Schools was formed by Louis Wade Sullivan, Ralph Cazort, Anthony Rachal, and Walter Bowie. In the early 1980s, they commissioned a study by Ruth Hanft which was published as "Blacks and the Health Professions in the 1980s: A National Crisis and A Time for Action". In March 1983, members of the Association of Minority Health Professions Schools met with Margaret Heckler, who was Secretary of the Department of Health and Human Services. Heckler was said to be disturbed by the "Blacks and the Health Professions..." documentation of life expectancy disparities, calling it an "affront to our ideals and to the genius of American medicine". A month later, Heckler contacted them to let them know that she had commissioned a taskforce to be led by Thomas E. Malone and Katrina Johnson.

The Report of the Secretary's Task Force on Black and Minority Health was published in August 1985.

== Findings ==
The Heckler Report found that in the US, 60,000 deaths occurred each year due health disparities. It outlined the six causes of death that accounted for more than 80% of mortality among ethnic and racial minorities. The report included recommendations to reduce these health disparities, as well as to collect data of a higher quality for Hispanics, Asian Americans, American Indians, and Alaska Natives.

== Legacy ==
The Heckler Report was the first effort by the US government to investigate health inequality among racial and ethnic minorities. It has been called a "landmark", "groundbreaking", and "a transformative, driving force for change". It has served as the "anchor" of federal efforts to reduce and eliminate racial and ethnic health disparities. It directly led to the creation of the Office of Minority Health in 1986. Offices of minority health were additionally established in the Centers for Disease Control and Prevention (CDC), National Institutes of Health (NIH), and Health Resources and Services Administration (HRSA) as a result of the report.
