= List of United States Supreme Court cases, volume 94 =

Supreme Court of the United States
- Interactive map of Supreme Court of the United States
- 38°53′26″N 77°00′16″W
- Established: March 4, 1789; 236 years ago
- Location: Washington, D.C.
- Coordinates: 38°53′26″N 77°00′16″W
- Composition method: Presidential nomination with Senate confirmation
- Authorised by: Constitution of the United States, Art. III, § 1
- Judge term length: life tenure, subject to impeachment and removal
- Number of positions: 9 (by statute)
- Website: supremecourt.gov

This is a list of cases reported in volume 94 of United States Reports, decided by the Supreme Court of the United States in 1876 and 1877.

== Justices of the Supreme Court at the time of 94 U.S. ==
The Supreme Court is established by Article III, Section 1 of the Constitution of the United States, which says: "The judicial Power of the United States, shall be vested in one supreme Court . . .". The size of the Court is not specified; the Constitution leaves it to Congress to set the number of justices. Under the Judiciary Act of 1789 Congress originally fixed the number of justices at six (one chief justice and five associate justices). Since 1789 Congress has varied the size of the Court from six to seven, nine, ten, and back to nine justices (always including one chief justice).

When the cases in 94 U.S. were decided the Court comprised the following nine members:

Portrait	Justice	Office	Home State	Succeeded	Date confirmed by the Senate (Vote)	Tenure on Supreme Court
	Morrison Waite	Chief Justice	Ohio	Salmon P. Chase	January 21, 1874 (63–0)	March 4, 1874 – March 23, 1888 (Died)
	Nathan Clifford	Associate Justice	Maine	Benjamin Robbins Curtis	January 12, 1858 (26–23)	January 21, 1858 – July 25, 1881 (Died)
	Noah Haynes Swayne	Associate Justice	Ohio	John McLean	January 24, 1862 (38–1)	January 27, 1862 – January 24, 1881 (Retired)
	Samuel Freeman Miller	Associate Justice	Iowa	Peter Vivian Daniel	July 16, 1862 (Acclamation)	July 21, 1862 – October 13, 1890 (Died)
	David Davis	Associate Justice	Illinois	John Archibald Campbell	December 8, 1862 (Acclamation)	December 10, 1862 – March 4, 1877 (Resigned)
	Stephen Johnson Field	Associate Justice	California	newly created seat	March 10, 1863 (Acclamation)	May 10, 1863 – December 1, 1897 (Retired)
	William Strong	Associate Justice	Pennsylvania	Robert Cooper Grier	February 18, 1870 (No vote recorded)	March 14, 1870 – December 14, 1880 (Retired)
	Joseph P. Bradley	Associate Justice	New Jersey	newly created seat	March 21, 1870 (46–9)	March 23, 1870 – January 22, 1892 (Died)
	Ward Hunt	Associate Justice	New York	Samuel Nelson	December 11, 1872 (Acclamation)	January 9, 1873 – January 27, 1882 (Retired)

== Notable Case in 94 U.S. ==
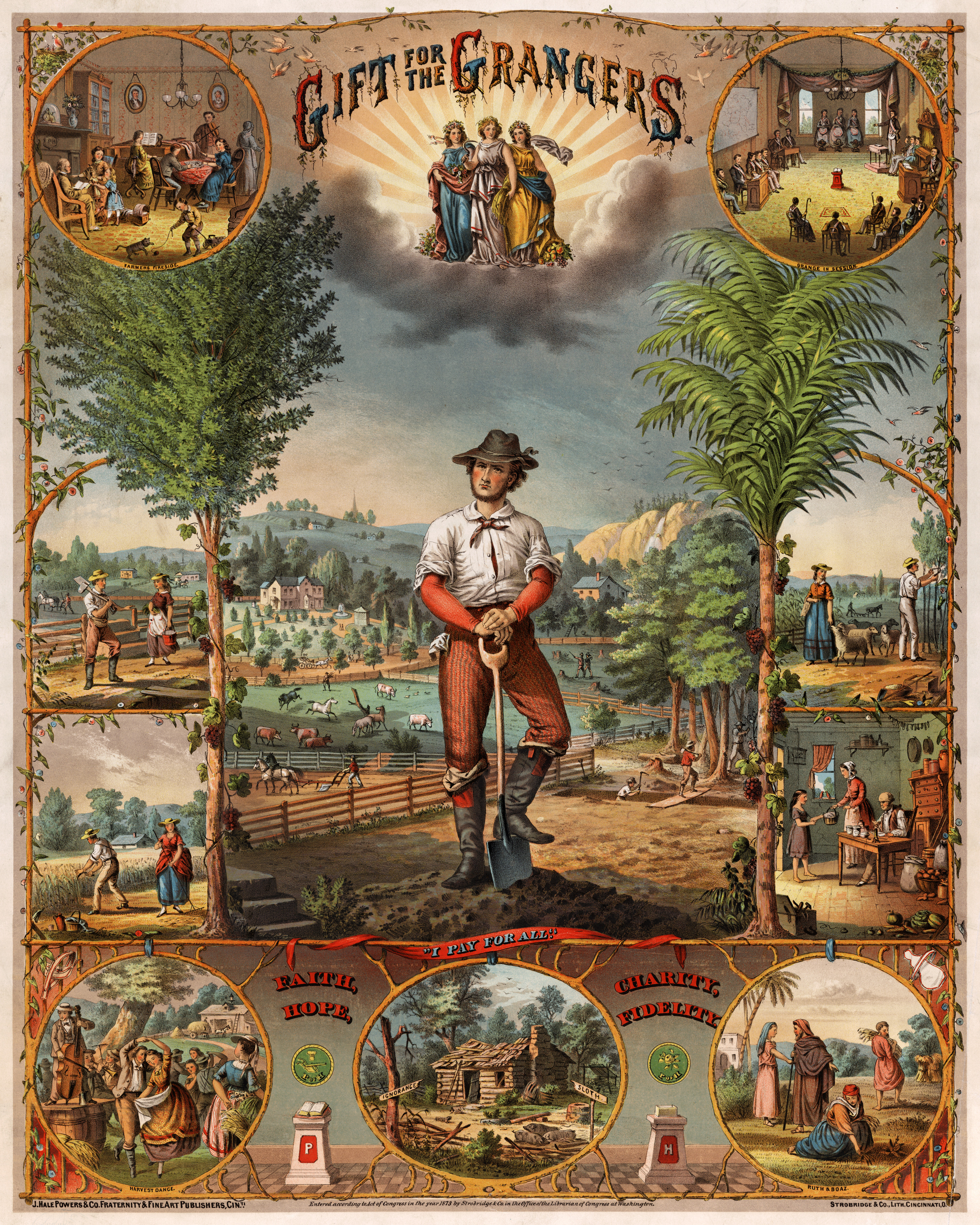
Granger poster, 1873

=== Munn v. Illinois ===
In Munn v. Illinois, 94 U.S. 113 (1876), the Supreme Court upheld the power of state governments to regulate private industries that affect "the common good". The case resulted because in 1871 the Illinois legislature responded to pressure from the National Grange, an association of farmers, by setting maximum rates that private companies could charge for the storage and transport of agricultural products. The Chicago grain warehouse firm of Munn and Scott was found guilty of violating the law but appealed the conviction on the grounds that the law was an unconstitutional deprivation of property without due process of law that violated the Fourteenth Amendment. The Supreme Court of Illinois ruled in favor of the State, and the US Supreme Court upheld its judgment. In his opinion for the Court, Chief Justice Morrison Waite affirmed the constitutionality of state regulation extending to private industries that affect public interests, also stating that even though Congress alone is granted control over interstate commerce, a state could take action in the public interest without impairing that federal control. Significantly, this ruling also applied to railroads, as railroad companies were deemed private companies serving the public interest. Munn v. Illinois was a landmark precedent that state regulation of grain elevator rates and railroad rates was within the bounds of the Constitution.

== Citation style ==
Under the Judiciary Act of 1789 the federal court structure at the time comprised District Courts, which had general trial jurisdiction; Circuit Courts, which had mixed trial and appellate (from the US District Courts) jurisdiction; and the United States Supreme Court, which had appellate jurisdiction over the federal District and Circuit courts—and for certain issues over state courts. The Supreme Court also had limited original jurisdiction (i.e., in which cases could be filed directly with the Supreme Court without first having been heard by a lower federal or state court). There were one or more federal District Courts and/or Circuit Courts in each state, territory, or other geographical region.

Bluebook citation style is used for case names, citations, and jurisdictions.

- "C.C.D." = United States Circuit Court for the District of . . .
  - e.g.,"C.C.D.N.J." = United States Circuit Court for the District of New Jersey
- "D." = United States District Court for the District of . . .
  - e.g.,"D. Mass." = United States District Court for the District of Massachusetts
- "E." = Eastern; "M." = Middle; "N." = Northern; "S." = Southern; "W." = Western
  - e.g.,"C.C.S.D.N.Y." = United States Circuit Court for the Southern District of New York
  - e.g.,"M.D. Ala." = United States District Court for the Middle District of Alabama
- "Ct. Cl." = United States Court of Claims
- The abbreviation of a state's name alone indicates the highest appellate court in that state's judiciary at the time.
  - e.g.,"Pa." = Supreme Court of Pennsylvania
  - e.g.,"Me." = Supreme Judicial Court of Maine

== List of cases in 94 U.S. ==
Case Name	Page & year	Opinion of the Court	Concurring opinion(s)	Dissenting opinion(s)	Lower Court	Disposition
Wheeler v. Sedgwick	1 (1876)	Waite	none	none	C.C.S.D.N.Y.	affirmed
Hoadley v. City of San Francisco	4 (1876)	per curiam	none	none	C.C.D. Cal.	affirmed
Pike v. Evans	6 (1877)	Bradley	none	none	C.C.D. La.	reversed
Atlantic & P.R.R. Co. v. Hopkins	11 (1877)	Waite	none	none	C.C.D. Kan.	multiple
Ex parte Cutting	14 (1877)	Waite	none	none	C.C.E.D. Mo.	mandamus denied
Humes v. Scruggs	22 (1877)	Hunt	none	none	C.C.N.D. Ala.	reversed
Utley v. Donaldson	29 (1877)	Swayne	none	Strong	C.C.E.D. Mo.	reversed
Doyle v. Wisconsin	50 (1877)	Waite	none	none	Wis.	affirmed
United States v. Bostwick	53 (1877)	Waite	none	none	Ct. Cl.	reversed
Leavenworth Cnty. v. Barnes	70 (1877)	Hunt	none	none	C.C.D. Kan.	affirmed
United States v. Clark	73 (1877)	Waite	none	none	Ct. Cl.	reversed
Storm v. United States	76 (1877)	Clifford	none	none	C.C.D. Cal.	affirmed
199 Barrels Whiskey v. United States	86 (1877)	Waite	none	none	C.C.E.D. Tex.	affirmed
Consolidated F.J. Co. v. Wright	92 (1877)	Swayne	none	none	C.C.S.D.N.Y.	affirmed
Smith v. United States	97 (1876)	Waite	none	none	Sup. Ct. Terr. Wash.	argument denied
City of Omaha v. Hammond	98 (1877)	Miller	none	none	C.C.D. Neb.	affirmed
West W. Ry. Co. v. Foley	100 (1877)	Waite	none	none	C.C.W.D. Wis.	affirmed
Douglas Cnty. v. Bolles	104 (1877)	Strong	none	none	C.C.D. Kan.	affirmed
Hurst v. Hollingsworth	111 (1876)	Waite	none	none	not indicated	dismissal denied
Dayton v. Lash	112 (1876)	Waite	none	none	C.C.D. Minn.	dismissed
Munn v. Illinois	113 (1877)	Waite	none	Field	Ill.	affirmed
Chicago et al. R.R. Co. v. Iowa	155 (1877)	Waite	none	none	C.C.D. Iowa	affirmed
Peik v. Chicago & N. Ry. Co.	164 (1877)	Waite	none	none	C.C.W.D. Wis.	affirmed
Chicago et al. R.R. Co. v. Ackley	179 (1877)	Waite	none	none	Wis. Cir. Ct.	affirmed
Winona et al. R.R. Co. v. Blake	180 (1877)	Waite	none	none	Minn.	affirmed
Stone v. Wisconsin	181 (1877)	Waite	none	Field	Wis. Cir. Ct.	affirmed
Dunbar v. Myers	187 (1876)	Clifford	none	none	C.C.S.D.N.Y.	reversed
Johnson Cnty. v. January	202 (1877)	Swayne	none	none	C.C.D. Kan.	affirmed
Atlantic D. Co. v. James	207 (1877)	Strong	none	none	C.C.D.R.I.	reversed
United States v. Smith	214 (1877)	Waite	none	none	Ct. Cl.	affirmed
United States v. Phisterer	219 (1877)	Hunt	none	none	Ct. Cl.	affirmed
Cammeyer v. Newton	225 (1877)	Clifford	none	none	C.C.S.D.N.Y.	affirmed
Inman S.S. Co. v. Tinker	238 (1877)	Swayne	none	none	C.C.S.D.N.Y.	reversed
Foster v. Port of New Orleans	246 (1877)	Swayne	none	none	La.	reversed
Ex parte Jordan	248 (1877)	Waite	none	none	C.C.S.D.N.Y.	mandamus granted
Selma & M.R.R. Co. v. Louisiana Nat'l Bank	253 (1876)	Waite	none	none	C.C.S.D. Ala.	dismissed
East Oakland Twp. v. Skinner	255 (1877)	Hunt	none	none	C.C.S.D. Ill.	reversed
United States v. Young	258 (1877)	Waite	none	none	Ct. Cl.	multiple
Town of S. Ottawa v. Perkins	260 (1877)	Bradley	none	Waite	Ct. Cl.	reversed
Muller v. Dows	277 (1877)	Waite	none	none	C.C.D. Iowa	printed argument filed
Marion Cnty. v. Clark	278 (1877)	Clifford	none	none	C.C.D. Kan.	affirmed
Fuller v. Yentzer I	288 (1877)	Clifford	none	none	C.C.N.D. Ill.	affirmed
Fuller v. Yentzer II	299 (1877)	Clifford	none	none	C.C.N.D. Ill.	affirmed
MacKall v. Chesapeake et al. Co.	308 (1877)	Miller	none	none	Sup. Ct. D.C.	affirmed
Burlington Twp. v. Beasley	310 (1877)	Hunt	none	none	C.C.D. Kan.	affirmed
United States v. Fox	315 (1877)	Field	none	none	N.Y.	affirmed
Hill v. Thompson	322 (1877)	Waite	none	none	C.C.E.D. Mich.	dismissed
Barney v. City of Keokuk	324 (1877)	Bradley	none	none	C.C.D. Iowa	affirmed
First Nat'l Bank v. Whitman	343 (1877)	Hunt	none	none	Sup. Ct. D.C.	reversed
Ex parte Flippin	348 (1877)	Waite	none	none	C.C.W.D. Tenn.	mandamus denied
Cromwell v. Sac Cnty.	351 (1877)	Field	none	Clifford	C.C.D. Iowa	reversed
Johnson v. Harmon	371 (1877)	Bradley	Clifford	none	Sup. Ct. D.C.	affirmed
Beall v. White	382 (1877)	Clifford	none	none	Sup. Ct. D.C.	reversed
McCready v. Virginia	391 (1877)	Waite	none	none	Va.	affirmed
Chorpenning v. United States	397 (1877)	Swayne	none	none	Ct. Cl.	affirmed
United States v. Martin	400 (1877)	Hunt	none	none	Ct. Cl.	reversed
Gould v. Day	405 (1877)	Field	none	none	C.C.E.D. Mich.	affirmed
New York v. Commissioners	415 (1877)	Hunt	none	none	N.Y.	affirmed
Ex parte Loring	418 (1877)	Waite	none	none	C.C.E.D. Mich.	mandamus denied
Selden v. Equitable T. Co.	419 (1877)	Strong	none	none	C.C.D. Conn.	affirmed
Davis v. Brown	423 (1877)	Field	none	none	C.C.N.D. Ill.	affirmed
McClure v. Oxford Twp.	429 (1877)	Waite	none	none	C.C.D. Kan.	affirmed
Stewart v. Salamon	434 (1877)	Field	none	none	C.C.S.D. Ga.	reversed
National Bank v. Mechanics' Nat'l Bank	437 (1877)	Swayne	none	none	C.C.S.D.N.Y.	affirmed
Conro v. Crane	441 (1877)	Waite	none	none	C.C.N.D. Ill.	dismissed
Muller v. Dows	444 (1877)	Strong	none	none	C.C.D. Iowa	affirmed
Ex parte Smith	455 (1877)	Waite	none	none	C.C.W.D. Tenn.	mandamus denied
Connecticut et al. Co. v. Schaefer	457 (1877)	Waite	none	none	C.C.S.D. Ohio	affirmed
Howell v. Western R.R. Co.	463 (1877)	Miller	none	none	C.C.E.D.N.C.	reversed
Hinckley v. Gilman et al. R.R. Co.	467 (1877)	Waite	none	none	C.C.S.D. Ill.	dismissal denied
Milwaukee et al. Ry. Co. v. Kellogg	469 (1877)	Strong	none	none	C.C.D. Iowa	affirmed
Stark v. Starr	477 (1877)	Field	none	none	C.C.D. Or.	affirmed
Clark v. Hancock	493 (1877)	Waite	none	none	Cal.	dismissed
The Margaret	494 (1877)	Swayne	none	none	C.C.E.D. Mich.	affirmed
Wayne Cnty. v. Kennicott	498 (1877)	Waite	none	none	C.C.S.D. Ill.	affirmed
Eyster v. Centennial Bd.	500 (1877)	Waite	none	none	C.C.E.D. Pa.	reversed
Allore v. Jewell	506 (1877)	Field	none	Strong	C.C.E.D. Mich.	reversed
Davis v. Crouch	514 (1877)	Waite	none	none	Va.	dismissed
The Edith	518 (1877)	Strong	none	none	C.C.S.D.N.Y.	affirmed
Hyde v. Woods	523 (1877)	Miller	none	none	C.C.D. Cal.	affirmed
Waite v. Dowley	527 (1877)	Miller	none	none	Vt.	affirmed
Doyle v. Continental Ins. Co.	535 (1877)	Hunt	none	Bradley	C.C.W.D. Wis.	reversed
Davis v. Alvord	545 (1877)	Field	none	none	Sup. Ct. Terr. Mont.	reversed
Southern E. Co. v. Dickson	549 (1877)	Hunt	none	none	C.C.S.D. Ala.	affirmed
Dutcher v. Wright	553 (1877)	Clifford	none	none	C.C.E.D. Wis.	affirmed
Aetna L. Ins. Co. v. France	561 (1877)	Bradley	none	none	C.C.E.D. Pa.	affirmed
Merrill v. Yeomans	568 (1877)	Miller	none	Clifford	C.C.D. Mass.	affirmed
Relief F. Ins. Co. v. Shaw	574 (1877)	Bradley	none	none	C.C.D. Mass.	affirmed
Seitz v. Mitchell	580 (1877)	Strong	none	none	Sup. Ct. D.C.	affirmed
Maclay v. Sands	586 (1877)	Waite	none	none	Sup. Ct. Terr. Mont.	reversed
Clapp v. Mason	589 (1877)	Hunt	none	none	C.C.D. Mass.	affirmed
Connecticut M.L. Ins. Co. v. Schwenk	593 (1877)	Strong	none	none	C.C.E.D. Pa.	affirmed
The Stephen Morgan	599 (1877)	Clifford	none	none	C.C.D. Md.	affirmed
Glenny v. Langdon	604 (1877)	Waite	none	none	C.C.S.D. Ohio	dismissal set aside
Russell v. Place	606 (1877)	Field	none	none	C.C.N.D.N.Y.	affirmed
New Jersey M.L. Ins. Co. v. Baker	610 (1877)	Hunt	none	none	C.C.N.D.N.Y.	affirmed
United States v. Joseph	614 (1877)	Miller	none	none	Sup. Ct. Terr. N.M.	affirmed
Erskine v. Milwaukee & S.P. Ry. Co.	619 (1877)	Waite	none	none	C.C.E.D. Wis.	affirmed
Eames v. Home Ins. Co.	621 (1877)	Bradley	none	none	C.C.S.D. Ill.	reversed
Johnson Cnty. v. Thayer	631 (1877)	Hunt	none	none	C.C.D. Kan.	affirmed
Boyd v. Alabama	645 (1877)	Field	none	none	Ala.	affirmed
Lowe v. Williams	650 (1877)	Waite	none	none	Neb.	dismissal denied
Crim v. Handley	652 (1877)	Clifford	none	none	C.C.S.D. Ga.	affirmed
Dallas Cnty. v. Mackenzie	660 (1877)	Hunt	none	none	C.C.W.D. Mo.	reversed
Gunn v. Plant	664 (1877)	Waite	none	none	C.C.S.D. Ga.	reversed
Goddard v. Ordway	672 (1877)	Waite	none	none	Sup. Ct. D.C.	supersedeas denied
Casey v. Galli	673 (1877)	Swayne	none	none	original	judgment for plaintiff
Scotland Cnty. v. Thomas	682 (1877)	Bradley	none	none	C.C.E.D. Mo.	affirmed
Cawood Patent Cases	695 (1877)	Strong	none	Field	C.C.N.D. Ill.	multiple
Pike v. Wassell	711 (1877)	Waite	none	none	C.C.E.D. Ark.	reversed
City of Memphis v. Brown	715 (1877)	Waite	none	none	C.C.W.D. Tenn.	dismissal denied
Chesapeake & O.R.R. Co. v. Virginia	718 (1877)	Strong	none	none	Va.	affirmed
Blake v. Robertson	728 (1877)	Swayne	none	none	C.C.E.D.N.Y.	affirmed
Jerome v. McCarter	734 (1877)	Strong	none	none	C.C.E.D. Mich.	affirmed
Corcoran v. Chesapeake & O.C. Co.	741 (1877)	Miller	none	none	Sup. Ct. D.C.	affirmed
Tate v. Norton	746 (1877)	Swayne	none	none	C.C.E.D. Ark.	affirmed
Collins v. Gilbert	753 (1877)	Clifford	none	none	C.C.W.D. Pa.	affirmed
Forbes v. Gracey	762 (1877)	Miller	none	none	C.C.D. Nev.	affirmed
Lippincott v. Mitchell	767 (1877)	Swayne	none	none	C.C.S.D. Ala.	affirmed
Hogan v. Kurtz	773 (1877)	Clifford	none	none	Sup. Ct. D.C.	affirmed
Cochrane v. Deener	780 (1877)	Bradley	none	Clifford	Sup. Ct. D.C.	reversed
Davis v. Indiana	792 (1877)	Miller	none	none	Ind.	affirmed
Melendy v. Rice	796 (1877)	Waite	none	none	Iowa	affirmed
American B. Co. v. Heidelbach	798 (1877)	Swayne	none	none	C.C.D. Kan.	reversed
Town of E. Lincoln v. Davenport	801 (1877)	Hunt	none	none	C.C.S.D. Ill.	affirmed
Sullivan v. Portland & K.R.R. Co.	806 (1877)	Swayne	none	none	C.C.D. Me.	affirmed
Bowen v. Chase	812 (1877)	Bradley	none	none	C.C.S.D.N.Y.	reversed
