= United States v. Young (1985) =

US Supreme Court case on judicial review of prosecutorial misconduct

- Supreme Court of the United States

Argued October 2, 1984 Decided February 20, 1985
- Full case name: United States v. Billy G. Young
- Citations: 470 U.S. 1 (more) 105 S.Ct. 1038
- Argument: Oral argument

Case history
- Prior: United States v. Young, 736 F.2d 565 (10th Cir. 1984)

Holding
- Judgement reversed: 1. Trial judges should immediately address unprofessional advocacy for the guilt of the defendant 2. Review of prosecutorial statements must consider whether they were invited by the defense 3. Judicial review of statements unchallenged during the original trial is only warranted when the error would undermine the trial's fairness

Court membership
- Chief Justice Warren E. Burger Associate Justices William J. Brennan Jr. · Byron White; Thurgood Marshall · Harry Blackmun; Lewis F. Powell Jr. · William Rehnquist; John P. Stevens · Sandra Day O'Connor

Case opinions
- Majority: Burger, joined by White, Powell, Rehnquist, O'Connor
- Concur/dissent: Brennan, joined by Marshall, Blackmun
- Dissent: Stevens

United States v. Young, 470 U.S. 1 (1985), is a United States Supreme Court case holding that while trial judges should immediately address the misconduct of prosecutors and defense attorneys, remarks that go unchallenged during the trial can be reviewed by appellate courts if the error would undermine the trial's fairness, and a retrial should be considered if the remarks were uninvited by the other side.

== Background ==
=== Compton Petroleum ===
Between 1976 and 1977, Compton Petroleum Corporation General Manager Billy G. Young defrauded the APCO Oil Corporation by preparing invoices that it was delivering crude oil, when the majority of its deliveries instead brought less valuable fuel oil to APCO Oil's refineries. When APCO Oil recognized the impurities during testing in September 1977, it persuaded the Federal Bureau of Investigation to probe the company's suppliers.

=== District Court ===
In his trial in the US District Court for the Western District of Oklahoma, Young claimed that he believed fuel oil mixed with natural-gas condensate was equivalent to crude oil. He argued that APCO Oil's initial acceptance of the deliveries reaffirmed this misunderstanding.

After Young's defense attorney claimed that the government did not believe in its case, the prosecutor encouraged the jury to convict Young by reminding them of Compton Petroleum's false invoices and financial incentive to commit fraud. The jury found Young guilty of mail fraud and false statement charges, but he was acquitted of interstate transport of stolen property.

=== Circuit Court ===
The Court of Appeals for the Tenth Circuit reversed Young's conviction, remanding for a retrial. The Tenth Circuit held that prosecutorial remarks were within the scope of review, even though the defense did not object during the original trial, because they were egregious enough to constitute a "plain error" under Rule 52b of the Federal Rules of Criminal Procedure. In the Tenth Circuit's view, misconduct by the defense does not justify subsequent prosecutorial misconduct.

== Supreme Court ==
=== Majority ===
Writing for the majority, Chief Justice Warren E. Burger highlighted that the American Bar Association's Criminal Justice Standards consider prosecutors expressing their belief of the defendant's guilt to be unprofessional. However, in the 1958 case Lawn v. United States, the Supreme Court sustained a criminal conviction despite improper prosecutorial remarks because the prosecutor was replying to an attack on the truthfulness of witnesses. In the majority's view, the Lawn test dictates that the prosecutor's remarks in this case were an invited reply to the defense's similarly unprofessional remarks, though Burger encourages trial justices to intervene whenever such remarks occur.

=== Concurrence/Dissent ===
Associate Justice William J. Brennan Jr. opined that the Supreme Court should have remanded the case to the Tenth Circuit to clarify why the prosecutor's statements would amount to a plain error deserving of judicial review. In his view, whether a plain error had occurred was a question of fact that would be better resolved by lower courts.

Additionally, citing Berger v. United States, Brennan felt that government representatives should be held to a higher standard of behavior, rather than allowing them to engage in invited replies to defense misconduct via further prosecutorial misconduct. Brennan noted that the prosecutor concluded his arguments by declaring "I don't think you're doing your job as jurors in finding facts as opposed to the law that this judge is going to instruct you," which he viewed as egregious misconduct uninvited by the defense's earlier statements.

=== Dissent ===
Associate Justice John Paul Stevens claimed that the Tenth Circuit's prior decision had already identified the prosecutorial misconduct as a plain error, making its order for a retrial satisfactory.

== Reaction ==
The Albany Law Review criticized this decision as outlining a "retaliation doctrine" that incentivizes both parties to not report misconduct if they believe it invites them to engage in similar misconduct. Law professor Martin Belsky argued that trials should instead maintain their fairness by requiring both sides to object to misconduct by the other, rather than having an opportunity to benefit from it.

== Legacy ==
In the 1993 case United States v. Olano, the Supreme Court cited this case in judging that while the presence of alternate jurors during jury deliberations violated Federal Rule of Criminal Procedure 24(c), it is not a plain error that can be corrected by appellate courts without prior objections during the lower court trial. Similar to prosecutorial misconduct invited by the defense, the presence of alternate jurors must be proven as prejudicial to the jury's verdict.
