= Office of Minority Health =

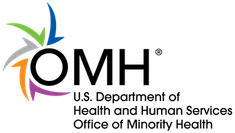

Agency overview
- Formed: 1986; 40 years ago
- Agency executive: Mahyar Mofidi, Director
- Parent department: United States Department of Health and Human Services (Office of the Assistant Secretary for Health)
- Website: minorityhealth.hhs.gov

The Office of Minority Health (OMH) is an American federal agency created in 1986. It is one of the most significant outcomes of the 1985 Secretary's Task Force Report on Black and Minority Health, also known as the "Heckler Report". The Heckler report "was a landmark effort in analyzing and synthesizing the present state of knowledge [in 1985] of the major factors that contribute to the health status of Blacks, Hispanics, Asian/Pacific Islanders, and Native Americans." The Office the Heckler Report established is dedicated to improving the health of racial and ethnic minority populations through the development of health policies and programs that will help eliminate health disparities. OMH was reauthorized by the Patient Protection and Affordable Care Act of 2010 (P.L. 111–148).

Dr. Herbert W. Nickens was the first director and first black director for the Office of Minority Health. He advocated for racial equity in health, and was also an advocate for increasing underrepresented minorities in medical education.

The Office of Minority Health is under the Department of Health and Human Services. Under OMH's Office of the Director, the organization has 3 divisions: Division of Policy and Data, Division of Programs Operations, and Division of Information and Education.

OMH works in partnership with communities and organizations in the public and private sectors. These collaborations support a systems approach for eliminating health disparities, national planning to identify priorities, and coordinated responses through focused initiatives. OMH provides funding to state offices of minority health, multicultural health, and health equity; community and faith-based organizations, institutions of higher education, tribes and tribal organizations; and other organizations dedicated to improving health.

== National Partnership for Action to End Health Disparities (NPA) ==
The purpose is to improve nationwide cohesion and coordination of strategies and actions to eliminate health disparities and achieve health equity. The NPA has five goals: increasing awareness; strengthening leadership at all levels; improving health and healthcare outcomes; improving cultural and linguistic competence; and improving data availability, and coordination, utilization, and diffusion of research and evaluation outcomes.

== Statutory-Required Resources ==
Created in 1987, the OMH Resource Center (OMHRC) serves as a hub of resources regarding minority health literature, research, and referrals. The center also provides technical assistance to community organizations on HIV/AIDS.

The Center for Linguistic and Cultural Competency in Health and The National Standards for Culturally and Linguistically Appropriate Services in Health and Health Care provide necessary resource and training for ensuring culturally and linguistically competent systems that will meet the needs of minority communities are integrated and addressed within health-related programs across the nation.
