= Oregon v. Elstad =

- Supreme Court of the United States

Argued October 3, 1984 Decided March 4, 1985
- Full case name: Oregon, Petitioner v. Michael James Elstad
- Citations: 470 U.S. 298 (more) 105 S. Ct. 1285; 84 L. Ed. 2d 222

Case history
- Prior: Conviction reversed, State v. Elstad, 61 Or. App. 673, 658 P.2d 552 (1983); cert. granted, 465 U.S. 1078 (1984).
- Subsequent: Conviction affirmed on remand, State v. Elstad, 78 Or. App. 362, 717 P.2d 174 (1986).

Holding
- The Self-Incrimination Clause of the Fifth Amendment does not require the suppression of a confession, made after proper Miranda warnings and a valid waiver of rights, solely because the police had obtained an earlier voluntary but unwarned admission from the suspect.

Court membership
- Chief Justice Warren E. Burger Associate Justices William J. Brennan Jr. · Byron White; Thurgood Marshall · Harry Blackmun; Lewis F. Powell Jr. · William Rehnquist; John P. Stevens · Sandra Day O'Connor

Case opinions
- Majority: O'Connor, joined by Burger, White, Blackmun, Powell, Rehnquist
- Dissent: Brennan, joined by Marshall
- Dissent: Stevens

Laws applied
- U.S. Const. amends. V, XIV

Oregon v. Elstad, 470 U.S. 298 (1985), is a landmark Supreme Court of the United States case relating to Miranda warnings.

== Background ==
A house in the town of Salem, Polk County (most of Salem is located in Marion County), Oregon was burglarized. A witness to the burglary contacted the local sheriff's office and implicated an 18 year old neighbor, Michael Elstad. Two officers went to Elstad's home with a warrant for his arrest. When the police entered the house and asked Elstad about the burglary he admitted to the burglary. The officers then escorted Elstad to the sheriff's headquarters. About an hour later, the same officers began interrogating Elstad by reading him his Miranda rights for the first time. During this interrogation, the officers obtained a written admission of Elstad's involvement in the burglary. Subsequently, Elstad was convicted of burglary and sentenced to 5 years and $18,000 in restitution.

== Case ==
The issue presented was whether the self-incrimination clause of the 5th Amendment requires suppression of a confession made after Miranda warnings and a waiver, because police obtained an earlier admission without Miranda warnings.

Justice O'Connor, writing for the majority, held that, while the pre-Miranda statements must be suppressed, the statements made after Miranda do not need to be suppressed as long as the statements were made knowingly and voluntarily.

== Subsequent Developments ==
In Missouri v. Seibert the police practice was to obtain a confession from suspects, then Mirandize the suspects and obtain a "valid" confession. Missouri developed this practice as a result of the holding in Oregon v. Elstad. The Supreme Court condemned this practice and suppressed the statements.
