= United States v. Young (1914) =

US Supreme Court case on standard for mail fraud indictments

- Supreme Court of the United States

Argued January 8, 1914 Decided January 26, 1914
- Full case name: United States v. Young
- Citations: 232 U.S. 155 (more) 34 S.Ct. 303

Holding
- The Criminal Code of 1909 does not require indictments for mail fraud to show that the fraudulent mailed statements were directly shown to the defrauded party

Court membership
- Chief Justice Edward D. White Associate Justices Joseph McKenna · Oliver W. Holmes Jr. William R. Day · Horace H. Lurton; Charles E. Hughes · Willis Van Devanter; Joseph R. Lamar · Mahlon Pitney

Case opinion
- Majority: McKenna, joined by unanimous

United States v. Young, 232 U.S. 155 (1914), is a United States Supreme Court case holding that the Criminal Code of 1909 does not require indictments for mail fraud to show that the fraudulent mailed statements were directly shown to the defrauded party.

== Background ==
=== Codification ===
In the early history of the United States, the federal government lacked a formal codification of its laws. Instead, lawyers relied on the Library of Congress, which publishes a new volume of United States Statutes at Large at the end of each two-year session of Congress to compile all newly passed acts and resolutions. However, searching through the Statutes at Large is cumbersome because its contents are organized by their date of passage, rather than topic area.

In 1874, Congress published the Revised Statutes of the United States, codifying all federal law as of December 1873. However, beyond an update in 1878 to include revisions as of March 1877, the Revised Statutes failed to capture new updates in federal law.

Until the 1926 approval of the United States Code, which maintains an up-to-date codification of federal law, Congress instead enacted topic-specific codifications like the Criminal Code of 1909 and the Judicial Code of 1911. As a result, many judges and lawyers would rely on the West Publishing Company's Compiled Statutes of the United States, a privately prepared codification of all federal law published in 1901 and re-published in 1913.

=== District Court ===
On May 5, 1911, the defendant used his position as President of the Southern Hardware Supply Company in Mobile County, Alabama, to defraud the New York City-based firm Hollingshead and Campbell. Young used the United States mail to send false statements that overstated his company's assets, successfully convincing Hollingshead and Campbell to persuade other companies into offering loans to the Southern Hardware Supply Company.

When considered by the US District Court for the Southern District of Alabama, the federal indictments against Young were deemed insufficient for not directly alleging that the fraudulent mailed statements were shown to the defrauded parties.

== Supreme Court ==
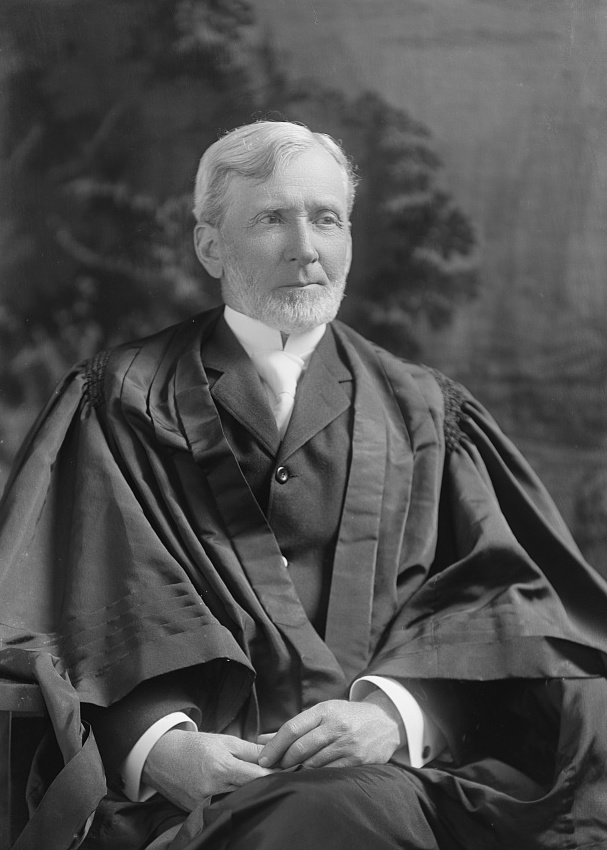
Associate Justice Joseph McKenna wrote for a unanimous Supreme Court in reversing the District Court's judgement

Under the Criminal Appeals Act of 1907, the United States government could petition the Supreme Court for a writ of error whenever any lower federal court issued a decision that prevented "a judgement of conviction for insufficiency of the indictment, where such decision is based upon the invalidity or construction of the statute upon which the indictment is founded."

In a unanimous decision written by Associate Justice Joseph McKenna, the Supreme Court agreed with Solicitor General John W. Davis that the District Court erred in claiming that an indictment for mail fraud would have required Hollingshead and Campbell to use the false statements mailed by Young in their negotiations with other firms. The Supreme Court held that the District Court improperly relied upon a higher standard for indictment based on an 1889 act codified in the Compiled Statutes, rather than using the broader provisions found in the Criminal Code of 1909, which merely require that the scheme to defraud others uses the mail.
