= List of United States Supreme Court cases, volume 470 =

This is a list of all the United States Supreme Court cases from volume 470 of the United States Reports:

Case name	Citation	Date decided
United States v. Young	470 U.S. 1	1985
United States v. Dann	470 U.S. 39	1985
Shea v. Louisiana	470 U.S. 51	1985
Ake v. Oklahoma	470 U.S. 68	1985
United States v. Louisiana	470 U.S. 93	1985
Chemical Mfrs. Ass'n v. Nat. Res. Def. Council, Inc.	470 U.S. 116	1985
NAACP v. Hampton Cnty. Election Comm'n	470 U.S. 166	1985
Heckler v. Turner	470 U.S. 184	1985
Dean Witter Reynolds Inc. v. Byrd	470 U.S. 213	1985
Oneida Cnty. v. Oneida Indian Nation	470 U.S. 226	1985
Sup. Ct. of N.H. v. Piper	470 U.S. 274	1985
A residency requirement that limits who may be licensed to practice law in a state violates the Privileges and Immunities Clause.
Oregon v. Elstad	470 U.S. 298	1985
Marrese v. Am. Acad. of Ortho. Surgeons	470 U.S. 373	1985
Air France v. Saks	470 U.S. 392	1985
St. L. Sw. R. Co. v. Dickerson	470 U.S. 409	1985
Herb's Welding, Inc. v. Gray	470 U.S. 414	1985
Nat'l R.R. Passenger Corp. v. Atchison T. & S.F.R. Co.	470 U.S. 451	1985
Fed. Election Comm'n v. Nat'l Conservative Pol. Action Comm.	470 U.S. 480	1985
United States v. Gagnon	470 U.S. 522	1985
Clev. Bd. of Ed. v. Loudermill	470 U.S. 532	1985
Anderson v. Bessemer City	470 U.S. 564	1985
First Nat'l Bank v. Bartow Cnty. Bd. of Tax Assessors	470 U.S. 583	1985
Wayte v. United States	470 U.S. 598	1985
Bennett v. New Jersey	470 U.S. 632	1985
Bennett v. Ky. Dept. of Ed.	470 U.S. 656	1985
United States v. Sharpe	470 U.S. 675	1985
Fla. Power & Light Co. v. Lorion	470 U.S. 729	1985
Winston v. Lee	470 U.S. 753	1985
Lindahl v. Office of Personnel Management	470 U.S. 768	1985
Hayes v. Florida	470 U.S. 811	1985
Heckler v. Chaney	470 U.S. 821	1985
Ball v. United States	470 U.S. 856	1985
Metropolitan Life Insurance Co. v. Ward	470 U.S. 869	1985
Bd. of Ed. v. Nat'l Gay Task Force	470 U.S. 903	1985
Fugate v. New Mexico	470 U.S. 904	1985
