= Kevin O'Malley =

American lawyer and diplomat

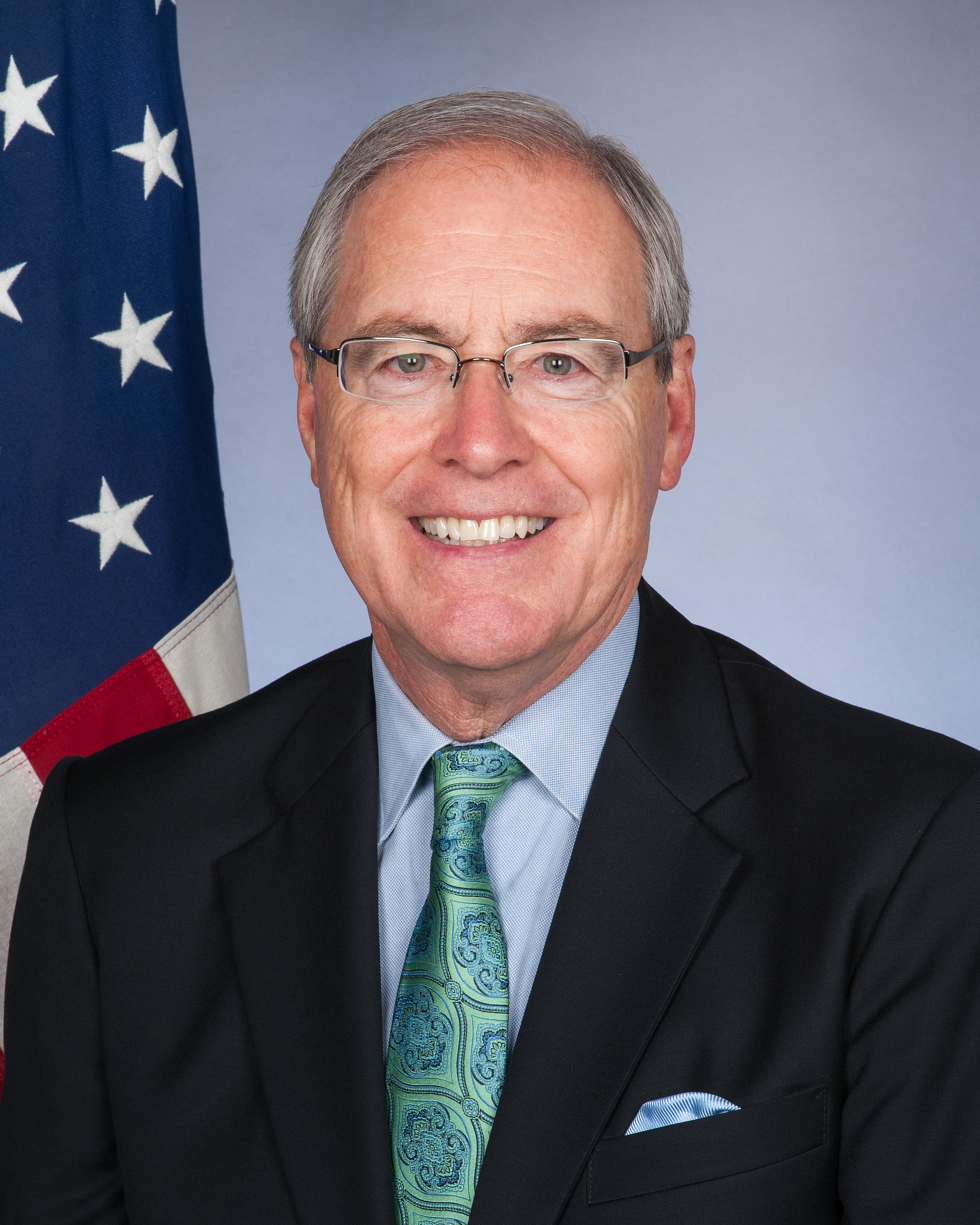

United States Ambassador to Ireland
- In office October 8, 2014 – January 20, 2017
- President: Barack Obama
- Preceded by: Dan Rooney
- Succeeded by: Edward F. Crawford

Personal details
- Born: May 12, 1947 (age 79) St. Louis, Missouri, U.S.
- Party: Democratic
- Spouse: Dena
- Children: Brendan; Ryan
- Education: Saint Louis University (A.B.); Saint Louis University (J.D.)
- Profession: Attorney

Military service
- Allegiance: United States
- Branch/service: United States Army
- Rank: Officer
- Unit: United States Army Reserve

Kevin Francis O'Malley (born May 12, 1947) is an American lawyer and diplomat who was the United States Ambassador to Ireland from 2014 to 2017.

== Personal life and education ==
Kevin O'Malley is a second generation Irish American, with dual citizenship of the United States and Ireland until he returned his Irish citizenship in order to become ambassador. He has Irish ancestry on both sides of his family, and his paternal grandparents came from Westport, County Mayo.

O'Malley is a Catholic, and attended St. Vincent's Seminary at second level in Cape Girardeau, Missouri, and the novitiate at St. Mary's Seminary in Perryville, Missouri, where he studied for the priesthood. O'Malley received an A.B. in 1970 from Saint Louis University and a J.D. in 1973 from Saint Louis University School of Law.

O'Malley has been an active member of the Democratic Party in Missouri, and White House Chief of Staff Denis McDonough described O'Malley as a "close personal friend" of US President Barack Obama. He was previously an officer in the United States Army Reserve. He has two sons – Brendan and Ryan – with his wife, Dena, and two grandsons.

== Law and diplomatic career ==
O'Malley was a Special Attorney of the Organized Crime and Racketeering Section of the United States Department of Justice in Washington, D.C., Los Angeles, California and Phoenix, Arizona from 1974 to 1979 and was an Assistant United States Attorney in St. Louis, Missouri from 1979 to 1983. During his tenure as a federal prosecutor, he received the Distinguished Service Award from the United States Attorney General.

O'Malley served as an adjunct professor of law at Saint Louis University School of Law from 1979 to 1985, where he previously studied, and as an adjunct professor of law at Washington University School of Law in 2013 and 2014.

He was a legal instructor for the American Bar Association Central and East European Law Initiative (ABA CEELI) in Moscow, Russia in 1996 and Warsaw, Poland in 1999. In 1968, he had served as a Community Ambassador in Prague, Czechoslovakia.

In 2009, Governor of Missouri Jay Nixon appointed O'Malley to the Missouri Board of Healing Arts, the state's regulatory and disciplinary body for physicians, becoming its only non-physician member, and the physicians subsequently elected him as Board President.

He is a fellow of the American College of Trial Lawyers (ACTL), and a nationally recognised author of a treatise on jury instructions that is used in federal jury trials throughout the United States. He has been consistently chosen by the editors of The Best Lawyers in America for his work in medical negligence defence and white collar criminal defences.

O'Malley was a trial lawyer in the Litigation Department at Greensfelder, Hemker & Gale, P.C. in St. Louis, Missouri, where he was a partner, until resigning in order to become a US Ambassador. In 2013, he received the Award of Honor of The Lawyers Association of St. Louis.

=== Ambassador to Ireland ===
On June 5, 2014, O'Malley was nominated by President Obama for the position of US Ambassador of Ireland. Senator Claire McCaskill, a Democrat from Missouri, immediately threw her support behind O'Malley, as did Senator Roy Blunt, a Republican from Missouri. White House Chief of Staff Denis McDonough said that O'Malley would bring "a strong knowledge of the role of the religious and cultural underpinnings, and the very important foreign policy and national security undergirdings" of the relationship between the United States and Ireland. The appointment of O'Malley was approved by the Irish Government. On July 15, 2014, O'Malley underwent his first confirmation hearing before the US Senate Committee on Foreign Relations. He was unanimously approved by the committee.

On September 18, 2014, the US Senate voted on O'Malley's appointment and he was confirmed in a simple vote. O'Malley was then officially appointed by President Obama, and sworn in by Vice President Biden on September 30, 2014. He presented his credentials to Irish President Michael D. Higgins on October 8, 2014, taking up residency nearby in the Deerfield Residence in the Phoenix Park.

On November 8, 2016, the day of the US presidential election, he made a speech at the Guinness Storehouse in Dublin where he said "regardless of who our next president is in January, America's relationship with Ireland will remain strong because of the exceptional ties that already exist between our two countries." O'Malley served until January 20, 2017, the date of the presidential inauguration of Donald Trump.

== Creative Minds ==
The Creative Minds Series is a cross-cultural program launched in 2015 by Ambassador O'Malley and the U.S. Embassy in Dublin. The series invites prominent U.S. artists, writers, filmmakers, digital culture innovators and musicians to share their experiences with young Irish students and audiences. According to Ambassador O'Malley, the mission of the ongoing series is "to find ways to create new collaborations and encourage more creative economic linkages between young people in the United States and Ireland. The economies of the 21st century depend increasingly on creativity to succeed and this series aims to strengthen the creative industry ties between the United States and Ireland."

The series was launched on February 13, 2015, with musician Ben Folds and a performance in the ballroom of the U.S. Ambassador's Residence in Phoenix Park. The event was broadcast live on RTE Radio and moderated by Irish radio host Sean Rocks. Amongst the attendees at the inaugural event were Irish President Michael D. Higgins and his wife, Sabina.

On April 23, 2015, the annual U.S. Embassy Economic Conference was held on the lawn of the Phoenix Park residence. The event was part of Ambassador O'Malley's Creative Minds series and billed as "The Importance of the Creative Economy in the U.S.-Irish Relationship." The keynote speaker at the event was Taoiseach Enda Kenny TD.

In November 2015, Creative Minds partnered with Dublin City University's Ryan Academy to present the Creative Minds Social Entrepreneurship Hackathon aimed at finding solutions to social problems using entrepreneurial and business skills and to strengthen cross-border dialogue.

Other prominent guests of the Creative Minds series have included: The Sopranos creator David Chase; musician Christopher Tin; New York City-based storytelling group The Moth; Pixar's Pete Docter and Jonas Rivera; songwriter Paul Williams; singer-songwriter Glen Hansard; singer-songwriter John Prine; co-founder of Square and LaunchCode, Jim McKelvey; singer-songwriter Patty Griffin; rapper and poet Saul Williams; singer-songwriter Rufus Wainwright; singer-songwriter Ryan Bingham; restaurateur and New York Times best-selling author Danny Meyer; Grammy award-winning banjo player and composer Béla Fleck and Abigail Washburn; general manager and president of Pixar, Jim Morris; Americana musician Shakey Graves; A cappella group Straight No Chaser; musician Andrew Bird; Ryanair CEO and businessman Michael O'Leary; songwriter Jimmy Webb; and U.S. Vice President Joe Biden.

On November 3, 2015, at an opening session for the Web Summit in Dublin, Irish Independent journalist Dearbhail McDonald remarked during an interview with Ambassador O'Malley that he had "managed almost single-handedly to turn Deerfield- the US Ambassador's Residence in Ireland in the Phoenix Park- into one of the coolest music venues and one of the coolest arts venues through the Creative Minds Series."

On March 15, 2016, at the annual White House St. Patrick's Day party, President Barack Obama said of Ambassador O'Malley and his Creative Minds program: "Although Kevin's only been in Ireland for 18 months, he has crammed in almost eight years of work. One of his legacies will be his Creative Minds initiative, in which he's been busy connecting the next generation of Irish and American leaders."

At the Ireland Fund 40th Anniversary Gala in Dublin on June 24, 2016, Vice President Joe Biden said of Ambassador O'Malley, "one of the things I am so proud of our ambassador- Ambassador O'Malley- is he has gone out of his way to reach in every nook and cranny, every organization- big and small- to get to know this country, to get to know what makes it tick, to get to know each of the individuals. It's personal. And I think he's done our country a great, great service and presumptuous of me to say... I think he's been a great value to your country as well."

In July 2016, Ambassador O'Malley and the U.S. Embassy Dublin produced a two-part series entitled Creative Minds in Medicine. The first part of the series, Wired for Sound, brought together the cochlear implant teams from the Vanderbilt University Department of Otolaryngology in Nashville, Tennessee and the Irish National Cochlear Implant Program (NCIP) at Beaumont Hospital in Dublin, Ireland. Part two of the Creative Minds in Medicine series was held on World Head and Neck Cancer Day and hosted by Professor James Paul O'Neill from the Royal College of Surgeons in Ireland.

== See also ==
- Embassy of the United States in Dublin
- Deerfield Residence
- Ireland–United States relations

Diplomatic posts
| Preceded by Dan Rooney | United States Ambassador to Ireland; 2014–2017 | Succeeded by Edward F. Crawford |
