= Alexandra McKnight =

American diplomat

Alexandra McKnight is an American diplomat. McKnight was the charge d'affaires and interim chief of mission in Ireland from January 19, 2021, until February 10, 2022.

== Life ==
McKnight is originally from Texas but grew up in Cincinnati, Ohio. She graduated from the University of Texas, with a B.A. in German and Russian. After graduation, she joined the Harvard Institute for International Development’s WorldTeach program and taught English in Lask, Poland, and Kaliningrad, Russia.

McKnight joined the U.S. Foreign Service in 1998. During her career as a Foreign Service Officer, McKnight has worked in Spain, Portugal, Malta, the Czech Republic, Slovakia, Columbia, Italy, and Ukraine. From 2016 to 2018, she was the Migration and Human Rights Chief at the U.S. Embassy in Mexico City. While working in Washington, DC, McKnight served as Senior Advisor for Resilience to the Director General of the Foreign Service as well as deputy director of the Office of Nordic, Baltic, and Arctic Security Affairs in the Bureau of European and Eurasian Affairs.

McKnight was transferred to Ireland to serve as deputy chief of mission in September 2020. In January 2021, US Ambassador to Ireland Edward F. Crawford resigned from his role with the outgoing president, Donald Trump. It is customary to tender one's resignation with the incoming of a new president, although not guaranteed that the incoming president will accept the resignation. McKnight was chosen to be interim chief of mission until a new ambassador could be appointed. During her tenure as interim chief of mission, the U.S. Embassy in Ireland held a tribute in 2021 to the victims of the 9/11 terrorist attack of 2001. During this memorial, McKnight defended President Joe Biden's treatment of the war in Afghanistan. In February 2022, Claire Cronin presented her credentials as the new US Ambassador to Ireland.
