= Edward F. Crawford (businessman) =

American businessman and diplomat (born 1938)

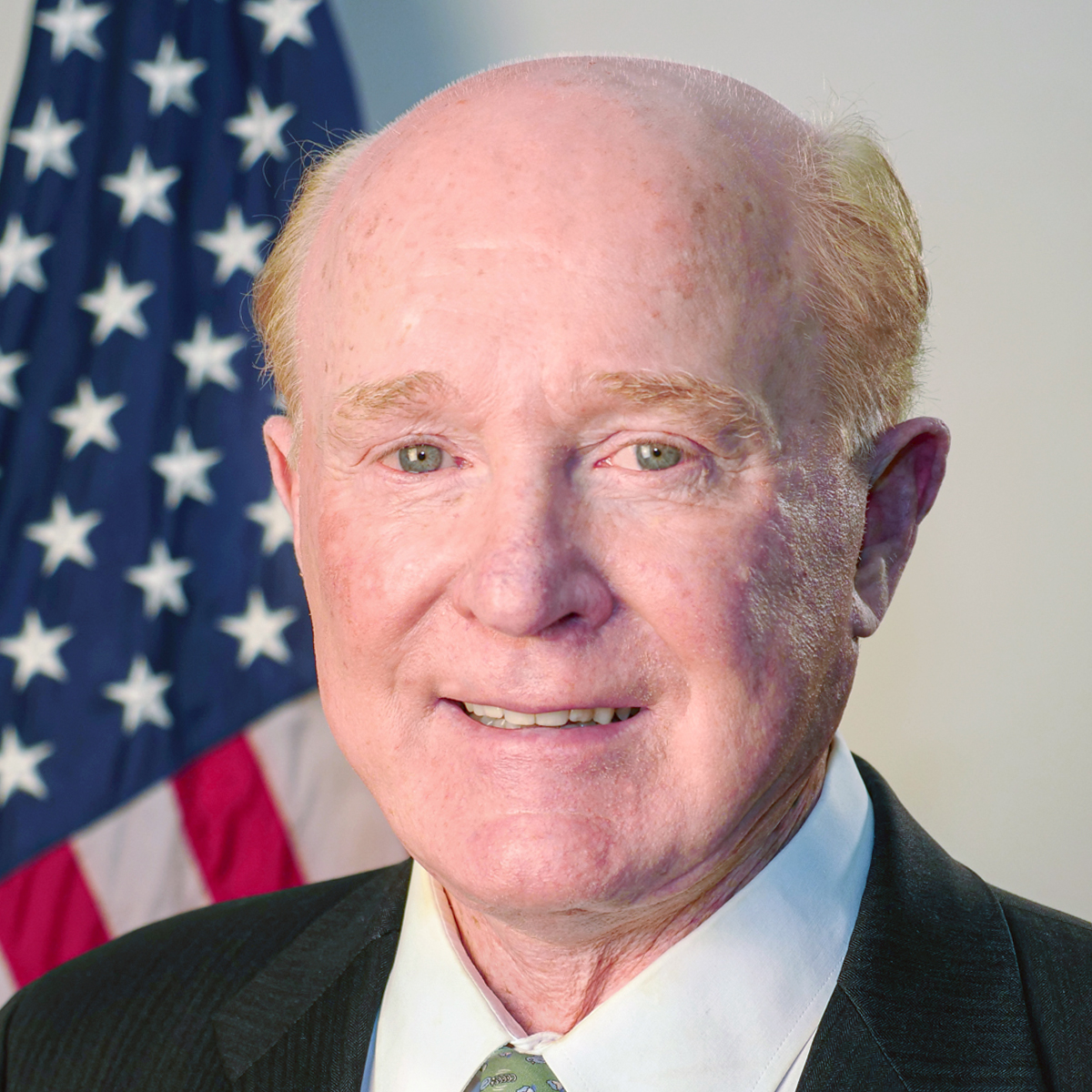
- Official portrait, 2019

24th United States Ambassador to Ireland
- In office July 1, 2019 – January 19, 2021
- President: Donald Trump
- Preceded by: Kevin O'Malley
- Succeeded by: Alexandra McKnight (Chargé d'affaires); Claire D. Cronin

Personal details
- Born: Edward Francis Crawford; April 25, 1938 (age 88) New York City, U.S.
- Party: Republican
- Spouse: Mary Crawford (m. 1973)
- Children: 1
- Education: John Carroll University

Military service
- Allegiance: United States
- Branch/service: U.S. Army: Ohio Army National Guard
- Unit: 107th Armored Cavalry

Edward Francis Crawford (born April 25, 1938) is an American businessman, entrepreneur, and former diplomat who was the 24th U.S. ambassador to Ireland from 2019 to 2021. He previously was chairman and CEO of Park-Ohio Holdings, "an industrial supply chain logistics and diversified manufacturing business."

== Early life and education ==
Crawford's parents were Irish immigrants from Cork. His mother, Kate (Kay) Crawford (née Healy), originally came from Boherbue.

In 1948, his father, an electrician, together with Crawford's mother and two brothers wanted to move to California. During the move, as they were traveling on Route 20 in Ohio, their car broke down. His mother found an apartment for the family in Cleveland Heights and the family stayed in Ohio, where Crawford grew up.

In the early 1960s, Crawford attended night school at John Carroll University. He was a member of the Army National Guard from 1960 through 1963.

== Career ==
Apart from attending night school, Crawford also worked in sales at Inland Steel Company when he wanted to start his business career. In 1962, he dropped out of university after a 2 1/2 year period to launch his own business. In 1963, Crawford and his business partner Christopher Page launched Cleveland Steel Container, a company that produces steel pails. Crawford also established The Crawford Group, a venture capital and management consulting company, in 1964.

In 1992, Crawford sold his company Kay Home Products, which was named after his mother, Kay Crawford, to Park-Ohio Industries. As a result of the transaction, he became not only a major shareholder, but also chairman and CEO of Park-Ohio Industries. At the time, Park-Ohio was doing about $60 million in sales. Over time, the company's sales have risen to $1.3 billion. Crawford became president of Park-Ohio in 2018, when his son succeeded him as chairman and CEO. Crawford resigned from Park-Ohio on June 17, 2019.

Crawford has also been involved in a number of other companies. He was CEO of Beech Technology Systems, which "designs and manufactures tooling and pattern products for military, aeronautics, and commercial industries." He was a director at Hickok Incorporated, an electronic diagnostic tools and equipment manufacturer; Materion, a producer of high performance advanced engineered materials; and Joy Global Conveyors, a manufacturer of conveyor systems.

=== Awards ===
In 1969, the Small Business Administration selected Crawford as Ohio Small Businessman of the Year; he also was runner-up for the national award. The Mayo Society of Greater Cleveland named Crawford as their 2014 Person of the Year. He has also been recognized with the Northeast Ohio Business Hall of Fame Entrepreneurial Award, Ernst & Young Northeast Ohio Entrepreneur of the Year Award, and Small Business News Master Innovator Award.

Kent State University's Ambassador Crawford College of Business and Entrepreneurship is named after him.

== Ambassador to Ireland ==
In May 2019, Crawford was approved by the U.S. Senate's foreign relations committee to be the U.S. Ambassador to Ireland. He was confirmed by the United States Senate on June 13, 2019, making him the ambassador-designee. Vice President Mike Pence swore Crawford into office on June 26, 2019. Crawford officially began his term as ambassador when he presented his credentials to President of Ireland Michael D. Higgins on July 1, 2019. He resigned from his post in January 2021, at the end of the presidency of Donald Trump.

== Personal life ==
Crawford and his wife Mary have a son, Matthew, who attended Marshall Law School and succeeded his father as chairman and CEO of Park-Ohio. Crawford is a passionate basketball player. He plays on an AAU National Seniors Basketball Team out of Dallas.

== See also ==
- Deerfield Residence

Diplomatic posts
Preceded by Kevin O'Malley	United States Ambassador to Ireland; 2019–2021	Succeeded by Alexandra McKnight; Chargé d'affaires
