= Robert F. Kane =

American diplomat

United States Ambassador to Ireland
- In office March 6, 1984 – May 29, 1985
- President: Ronald Reagan
- Preceded by: Peter H. Dailey
- Succeeded by: Margaret Heckler

Personal details
- Born: March 15, 1926 Denver, Colorado, U.S.
- Died: December 22, 2007 (aged 81) San Mateo, California, U.S.
- Party: Republican
- Spouse: Mary Catherine Galligan (m. 1951)
- Children: 5
- Education: University of San Francisco

Military service
- Allegiance: United States
- Branch/service: United States Navy
- Rank: Petty officer third class
- Battles/wars: World War II

Robert Francis Kane (March 15, 1926 – December 22, 2007) was an American lawyer and judge in California who served as the United States Ambassador to Ireland from 1984 to 1985.

== Biography ==
Kane was born in Denver in 1926, graduated from Burlingame High School in San Mateo County, California, in 1944, and then served in the US Navy. He entered the University of San Francisco School of Law in 1949, graduated in 1952, and worked in law until 1969, when he was appointed to the San Mateo County Superior Court by then Governor of California Ronald Reagan. In 1971, he was elevated to the Court of Appeal for the First Appellate District, then in 1979 he resigned from the bench to join a private law firm.

In November 1983, Kane was nominated to be ambassador to Ireland by President Reagan. After confirmation by the Senate, he presented his credentials to Irish leaders on March 6, 1984. He had the official title of Ambassador Extraordinary and Plenipotentiary, and served in the role until May 29, 1985. Kane and his wife hosted President and Mrs. Reagan at Deerfield Residence during their 1984 visit to Ireland. After serving as ambassador, Kane returned to the private law firm until his retirement in 1994, after which he worked as a private mediator and arbitrator.

Kane married Mary Catherine "Keke" Galligan in 1951, and they had five children. Burlingame High School named Kane their 1985 Alumnus of the Year, and inducted him to their Athletic Hall of Fame in 2006. He died in San Mateo in 2007, following complications from heart surgery.

Diplomatic posts
Preceded by Peter H. Dailey	United States Ambassador to Ireland; 1984–1985	Succeeded by Margaret Heckler
