= Ireland–United States relations =

- Ireland: United States

Diplomatic mission
- Irish Embassy, Washington, D.C.: United States Embassy, Dublin

Envoy
- Ambassador Geraldine Byrne Nason: Ambassador Edward Sharp Walsh

According to the governments of the United States and Ireland, relations have long been based on common ancestral ties and shared values. Besides regular dialogue on political and economic issues, the U.S. and Irish governments have official exchanges in areas such as medical research and education.

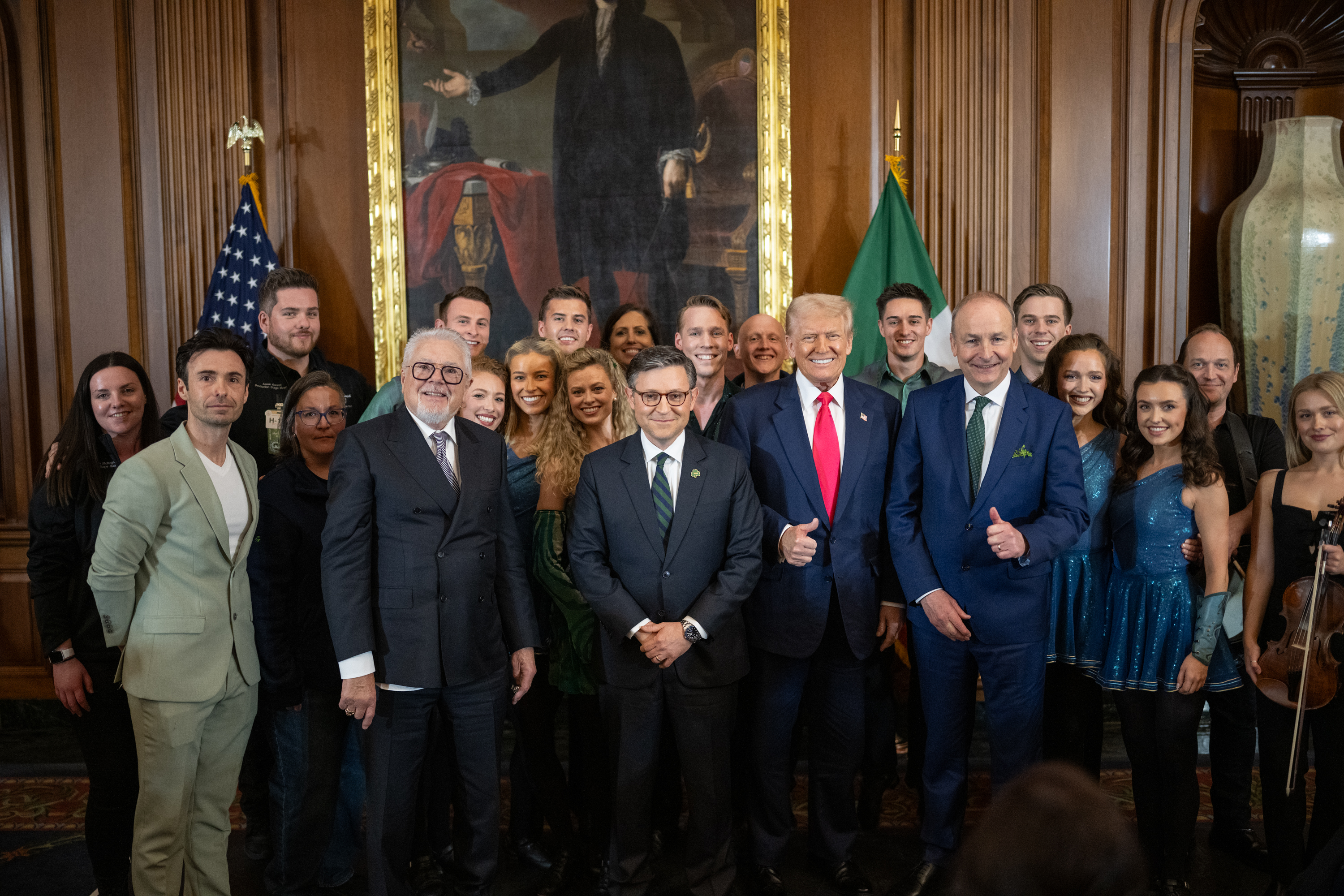
U.S. President Donald Trump and Irish Prime Minister Micheál Martin had lunch together following their meeting at the White House.

Ireland pursues a policy of neutrality through non-alignment and is consequently not a member of NATO, although it does participate in Partnership for Peace.

== History ==
=== Pre-Irish independence ===
In 1800 under the Acts of Union 1800, Ireland was politically unified with Britain to form the United Kingdom of Great Britain and Ireland. All major diplomatic decisions regarding Ireland were made in London. From this time until 1922, when twenty-six of thirty-two counties of Ireland seceded to form the Irish Free State (later becoming Ireland), the United States' formal diplomatic affairs with Ireland were carried out through London.

==== Immigration ====
Half of the Irish immigrants to the United States in its colonial era (1607–1775) came from the Irish province of Ulster, while the other half came from the other three provinces (Leinster, Munster and Connacht).

The Scots-Irish were some of the first settlers in the 13 colonies and played an important role in The War of Independence, as well as being some of the first cattle drivers in North America. The Irish exerted their own influence inside the United States, particularly through Democratic Party politics. From 1820 to 1860, 2 million Irish arrived in the United States, 75% of these after the Great Irish Famine (or The Great Hunger) of 1845–1852, struck. Most of them joined fast-growing Irish shantytowns in American cities. The famine hurt Irish men and women alike, especially those poorest or without land. It altered the family structures of Ireland because fewer people could afford to marry and raise children, causing many to adopt a single lifestyle. Consequently, many Irish citizens were less bound to family obligations and could more easily migrate to the United States in the following decade.

==== Fenians ====
After the American Civil War, American officials who were resentful of British support to the Confederacy during the conflict looked the other way as the Fenian Brotherhood plotted and even attempted an invasion of Canada. The Fenian raids proved a failure but Irish American politicians, a growing power in the Democratic Party, demanded more independence for Ireland and made anti-British rhetoric—called "twisting the lion's tail"—a staple of election campaign appeals to the Irish vote.

==== De Valera ====
Éamon de Valera, a prominent figure in the Easter Rising and the Irish War of Independence, was himself born in New York City in 1882. His American citizenship spared him from execution for his role in the Easter Rising.

De Valera went on to be named President of Dáil Éireann, and in May 1919 he visited the United States in this role. The mission had three objectives: to ask for official recognition of the Irish Republic, to float a loan to finance the work of the Government (and by extension, the Irish Republican Army), and to secure the support of the American people for the republic. His visit lasted from June 1919 to December 1920 and had mixed success. One negative outcome was the splitting of the Irish-American organisations into pro- and anti-de Valera factions. De Valera managed to raise $5,500,000 from American supporters, an amount that far exceeded the hopes of the Dáil. Of this, $500,000 was devoted to the American presidential campaign in 1920 which helped him gain wider public support there. In 1921, it was said that $1,466,000 had already been spent, and it is unclear when the net balance arrived in Ireland. Recognition was not forthcoming in the international sphere. He also had difficulties with various Irish-American leaders, such as John Devoy and Judge Daniel F. Cohalan, who resented the dominant position he established, preferring to retain their control over Irish affairs in the United States.

==== World War I ====
The United States Navy had five U.S. Naval Air Stations in Ireland from 1918 to 1919. These stations were specifically in place to protect Ireland and neighbouring countries from belligerent submarine aggression. The names and locations of these bases were NAS Queenstown, NAS Wexford, NAS Whiddy Island, NAS Berehaven and NAS Lough Foyle.

=== Post-Irish independence ===
==== U.S. recognition of Ireland ====
The Irish War of Independence ended in 1921 with the Anglo-Irish Treaty, which confirmed the partition of Ireland into the Irish Free State and Northern Ireland, the latter of which opted to remain a part of the United Kingdom. The Irish Free State quickly fell into the Irish Civil War between Pro-Treaty Forces who supported independence via partition and Anti-Treaty Forces who opposed partition and wanted independence for the entire island of Ireland. Pro-Treaty Forces won the Irish Civil War in 1923, and the following year the United States recognized the Irish Free State and established diplomatic relations with it. The Irish Free State was succeeded by the new state of Ireland in 1937, and formally declared itself a republic in 1949.

Given the major role of Irish politicians in the Democratic Party, De Valera hoped that Democratic President Franklin D. Roosevelt would be highly favorable toward Ireland, especially where tensions with Great Britain were concerned. Historian Bernadette Whelan concludes Dublin was disappointed regarding the negotiation of a US-Irish trade agreement and the purchase of weapons in the late 1930s. However, through "soft diplomacy," US-Irish relations achieved some degree of normalcy during this period. Whelen points out Washington's even-handed reaction to de Valera's successful revision of the 1922 Irish Constitution. It looked forward toward a united and independent republic, with Dublin controlling Northern Ireland. Washington did not agree and in the end the "special relationship" that emerged linked London and Washington.

==== World War II/The Emergency ====
Ireland was officially neutral during World War II, but declared an official state of emergency on 2 September 1939 and the Army was mobilized. As the Emergency progressed, more and newer equipment was purchased for the rapidly expanding force from the UK and the United States as well as some manufactured at home. For the duration of the Emergency, Ireland, while formally neutral, tacitly supported the Allies in several ways. The Irish Sea was mined. German military personnel were interned in the Curragh along with the belligerent powers' servicemen, whereas Allied airmen and sailors who crashed in Ireland were very often repatriated, usually by secretly moving them across the border to Northern Ireland. G2, the Army's intelligence section, played a vital role in the detection and arrest of German spies, such as Hermann Görtz.

==== Cold War ====
During the Cold War, Irish military policy, while ostensibly neutral, was biased towards NATO. G2 monitored communists and agents of communist governments operating in Ireland, primarily through embassies in Dublin, sharing information with western allies. During the Cuban Missile Crisis, Seán Lemass authorised the search of Cuban and Czechoslovak aircraft passing through Shannon and passed the information to the CIA.

==== Celtic Tiger ====
U.S. foreign direct investment in Ireland has been particularly important to the growth and modernization of Irish industry since 1980, providing new technology, export capabilities, and employment opportunities. During the 1990s, Ireland experienced a period of rapid economic growth referred to as the Celtic Tiger. While Ireland's historical economic ties to the UK had often been the subject of criticism, Peader Kirby argued that the new ties to the US economy were met with a "satisfied silence". Nevertheless, voices on the political left have decried the "closer to Boston than Berlin" philosophy of the Fianna Fáil-Progressive Democrat government. Growing wealth was accompanied by rapidly increased life expectancy and very high quality of life ratings; the country ranked first in The Economist's 2005 quality of life index.

==== The Troubles ====
The Troubles caused a strain in the Special Relationship between the United Kingdom and the United States. In February 1994, British Prime Minister John Major refused to answer US President Bill Clinton's telephone calls for days over his decision to grant Sinn Féin leader Gerry Adams a visa to visit the United States. Adams was listed as a terrorist by London. The US State Department, the CIA, the US Justice Department and the FBI all opposed the move on the grounds that it made the United States look 'soft on terrorism' and 'could do irreparable damage to the special relationship'. Under pressure from Congress, the president hoped the visit would encourage the IRA to renounce violence. While Adams offered nothing new, and violence escalated within weeks, the president later claimed vindication after the IRA ceasefire of August 1994. To the disappointment of the prime minister, Clinton lifted the ban on official contacts and received Adams at the White House on St. Patrick's Day 1995, despite the fact the paramilitaries had not agreed to disarm.

The US also involved itself as an intermediary during the Northern Ireland peace process, including, in 1995, US Senator George Mitchell being appointed to lead an international body to provide an independent assessment of the decommissioning issue, and President Clinton speaking in favor of the "peace process" to a huge rally at Belfast's City Hall where he called IRA Fighters "yesterday's men". Mitchell announced the reaching of the Good Friday Agreement on 10 April 1998 stating, "I am pleased to announce that the two governments and the political parties in Northern Ireland have reached agreement," and it emerged later that President Clinton had made a number of telephone calls to party leaders to encourage them to reach this agreement.

==== War on Terror ====
Ireland's air facilities were used by the United States military for the delivery of military personnel involved in the 2003 invasion of Iraq through Shannon Airport. The airport had previously been used for the invasion of Afghanistan in 2001, as well as the First Gulf War. The government of Ireland has come under internal and external pressure to inspect airplanes at Shannon Airport to investigate whether or not they contain extraordinary rendition captives. Police at Shannon said that they had received political instruction not to approach, search or otherwise interfere with US aircraft suspected of being involved in extraordinary rendition flights. Irish Justice Minister Dermot Ahern sought permission from the US for random inspection of US flights, to provide political "cover" to him in case rendition flights were revealed to have used Shannon; he believed at least three flights had done so. Ireland has been censured by the European Parliament for its role in facilitating extraordinary rendition and taking insufficient or no measures to uphold its obligations under the UN CAT.

==== European Union ====
With Ireland's membership in the European Union, the discussion of EU trade and economic policies, as well as other aspects of EU policy, is also a key element in the U.S.-Irish relationship. In recent years, Ireland has attempted to act as a diplomatic bridge between the United States and the European Union. During its 2004 Presidency of the Council of the European Union, Ireland worked to strengthen U.S.-EU ties that had been strained by the Iraq War, and former Irish Taoiseach John Bruton was named EU Ambassador to the United States. In May 2011, U.S. President Barack Obama visited Ireland. In 2012 according to a U.S. Global Leadership Report, 67% of Irish people approved of Obama's leadership. This was the fourth-highest rating for any surveyed country in Europe.

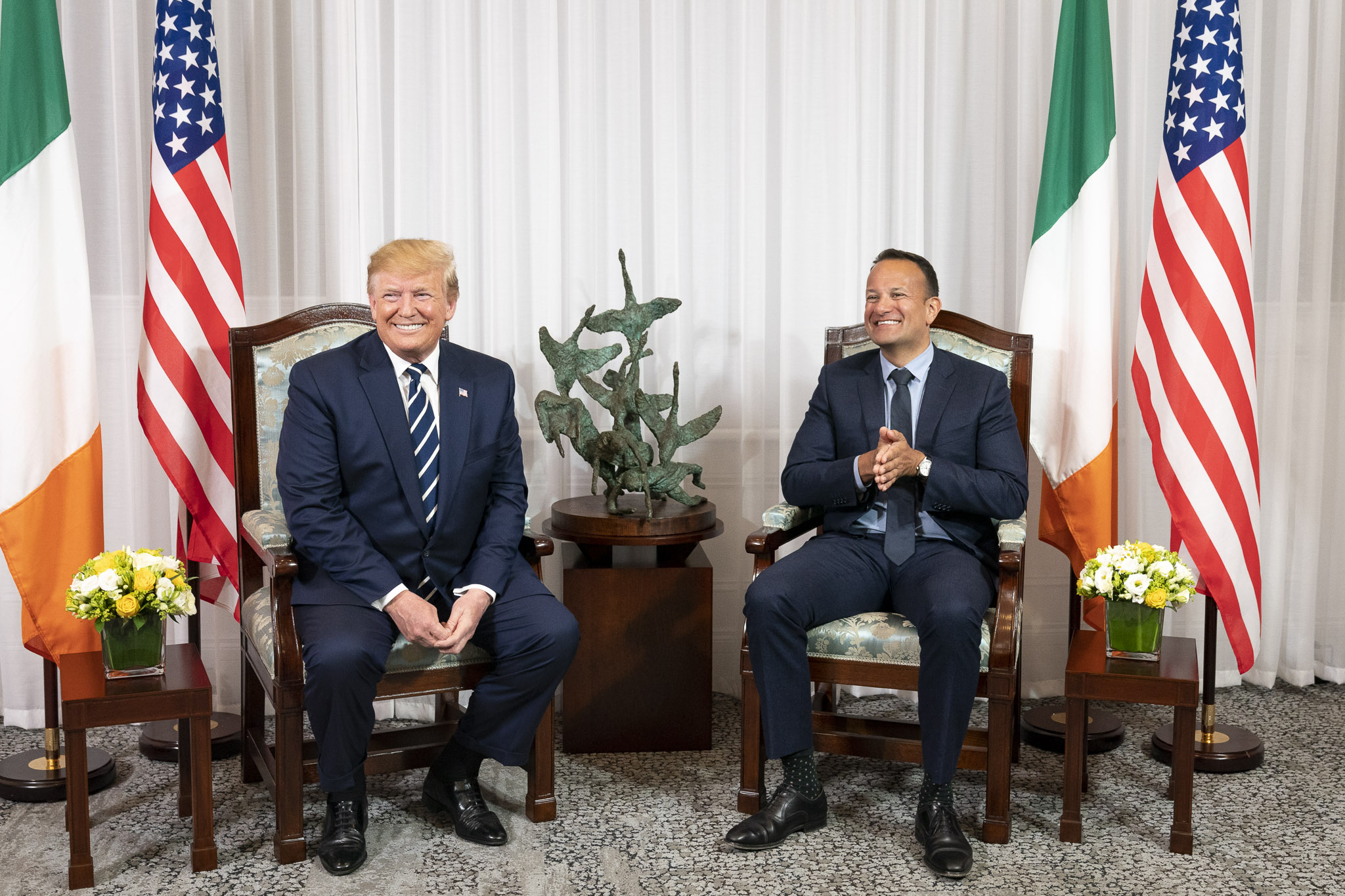
U.S. President Donald Trump and Irish Prime Minister Leo Varadkar have a meeting in June 2019 in Shannon.

In 2017, President Donald Trump sought to reform the tax code to repatriate American businesses abroad, and specifically referenced Ireland on several occasions, stating "Many, many companies, they're going to Ireland." Despite this, Irish politicians thought the U.S. tax overhaul posed little threat to U.S. investment in Ireland, with European Commissioner for Agriculture and Rural Development Phil Hogan stating, "Ireland remains a logical and very attractive European base for American business."

In April 2019, Nancy Pelosi, the Speaker of the United States House of Representatives, visited the border of Ireland and Northern Ireland and said that if Brexit compromised the Good Friday Agreement then there was "no chance" of a US–UK trade deal. During a visit to London in June 2021, the administration of President Joe Biden stated, "Any steps that imperil or undermine the Good Friday agreement will not be welcomed by the US."

In March 2023, Joe Biden visited Belfast, Northern Ireland, to celebrate the 25th anniversary of the Good Friday Agreement. Bill Clinton played a significant role in negotiating the GFA over several decades, and it has enjoyed bipartisan support in the United States.

==== Gaza war ====
Ireland has had an unusually close relationship with Palestine for a Western nation, due to perceived similarities between the two countries as products of British colonialism and both experiencing long-lasting and deep-rooted conflicts (i.e. the Israeli–Palestinian conflict and the Troubles). Jane Ohlmeyer, a history professor at Trinity College Dublin, said: "There can be a tendency — and we see this, for example, in the street murals in Belfast — to see the conflict through the prism of Northern Ireland, where republican nationalists sympathize with Palestine and loyalists, unionists with Israel". With America being seen as a staunch ally of Israel in the Gaza war which followed the 2023 Hamas-led attack on Israel, the Irish Taoiseach, Leo Varadkar, has acknowledged a "differences of opinions [between the US and Ireland] in relation to Israel and Gaza", particularly regarding the Israeli bombardment of Gaza. Varadkar noted there was "very strong historic support for Israel in the US, for lots of different reasons, but that's not going to deflect me from saying what I feel needs to be said". He called the bombardment "something approaching revenge", and has pushed for a ceasefire in the conflict. Referring to the Gaza genocide and the tradition of the Irish Taoiseach offering a bowl of shamrock to the American president as a gift, "no shamrocks for Genocide Joe" became a popular anti-war chant in both the Republic of Ireland and in Northern Ireland. Many called for Varadkar to not meet with U.S. President Joe Biden for Saint Patrick's Day, which he did on 17 March 2024.

== Economic ties ==
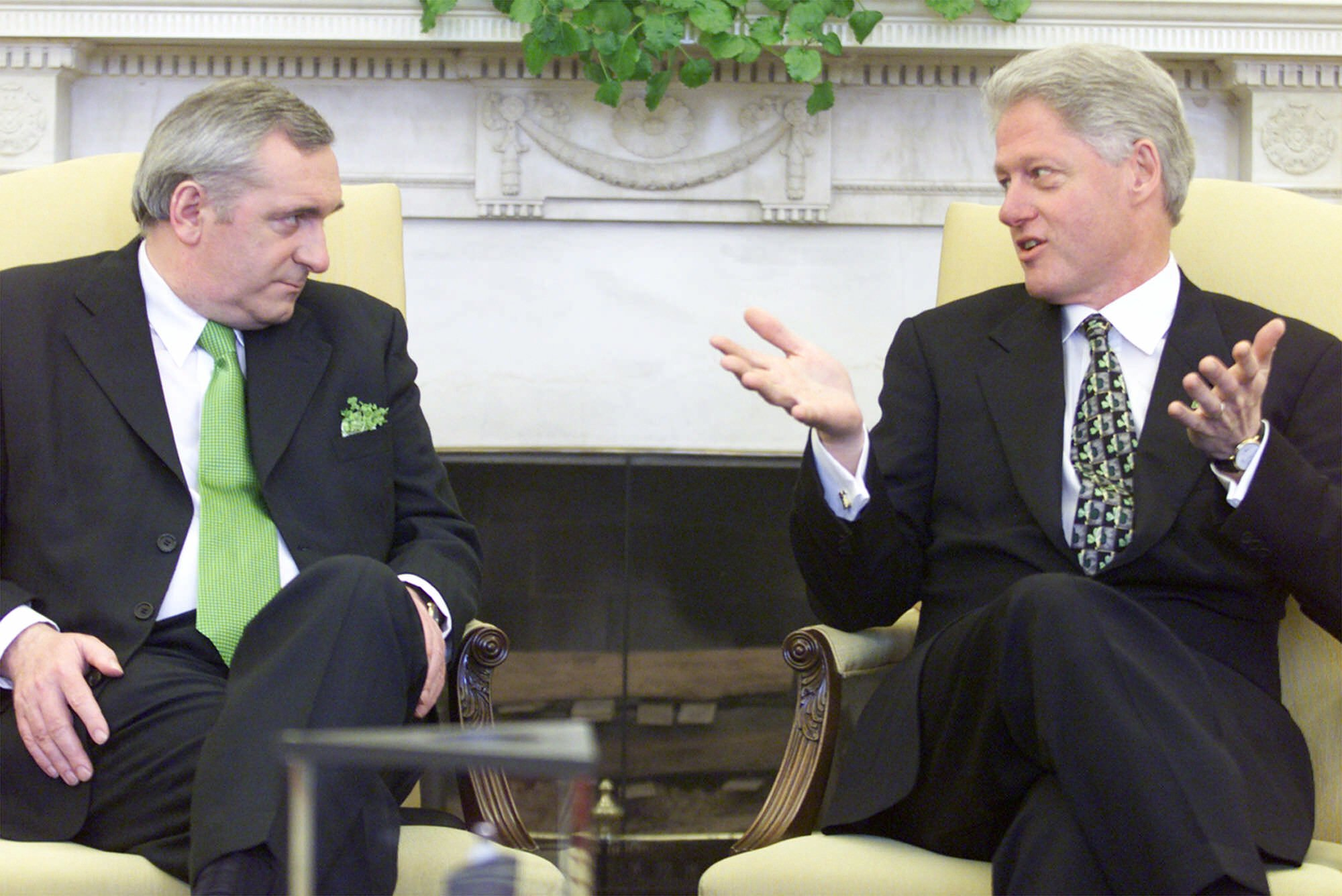
Taoiseach Bertie Ahern meeting President Bill Clinton in the oval office in March 2000.

Subsidiaries of US multinationals have located in Ireland due to low taxation and an educated English-speaking population. Ireland is the world's most profitable country for US corporations, according to analysis by US tax journal Tax Notes. In 2013, Ireland was named the "best country for business" by Forbes.

The United States is Ireland's largest export partner and second-largest import partner (after the United Kingdom), accounting for 23.2% of exports and 14.1% of imports in 2010. It is also Ireland's largest trading partner outside of the European Union. In 2010, trade between Ireland and the United States was worth around $36.25 billion. U.S. exports to Ireland were valued at $7.85 billion while Irish exports to the U.S. were worth some $28.4 billion, with Ireland having a trade surplus of $20.5 billion over the U.S. The range of U.S. products imported to Ireland includes electrical components, computers and peripherals, pharmaceuticals, electrical equipment, and livestock feed. Exports to the United States include alcoholic beverages, chemicals and related products, electronic data processing equipment, electrical machinery, textiles and clothing, and glassware.

The major U.S. investments in Ireland to date have included multibillion-dollar investments by Intel, Dell, Apple, Microsoft, IBM, Wyeth, Quintiles, Google, EMC and Abbott Laboratories. Currently, there are more than 600 U.S. subsidiaries operating in Ireland, employing in excess of 100,000 people and spanning activities from manufacturing of high-tech electronics, computer products, medical supplies, and pharmaceuticals to retailing, banking and finance, and other services. Many U.S. businesses find Ireland an attractive location to manufacture for the EU market, since as a member of the EU it has tariff free access to the European Common Market. Government policies are generally formulated to facilitate trade and inward direct investment. The availability of an educated, well-trained, English-speaking work force and relatively moderate wage costs have been important factors. Ireland offers good long-term growth prospects for U.S. companies under an innovative financial incentive programme, including capital grants and favourable tax treatment, such as a low corporation income tax rate for manufacturing firms and certain financial services firms. Irish firms are now beginning to provide a lot of employment in the U.S., for example indigenous Irish companies, particularly in the high tech sector have provided in excess of 80,000 jobs to date for American citizens.

== Cultural ties ==
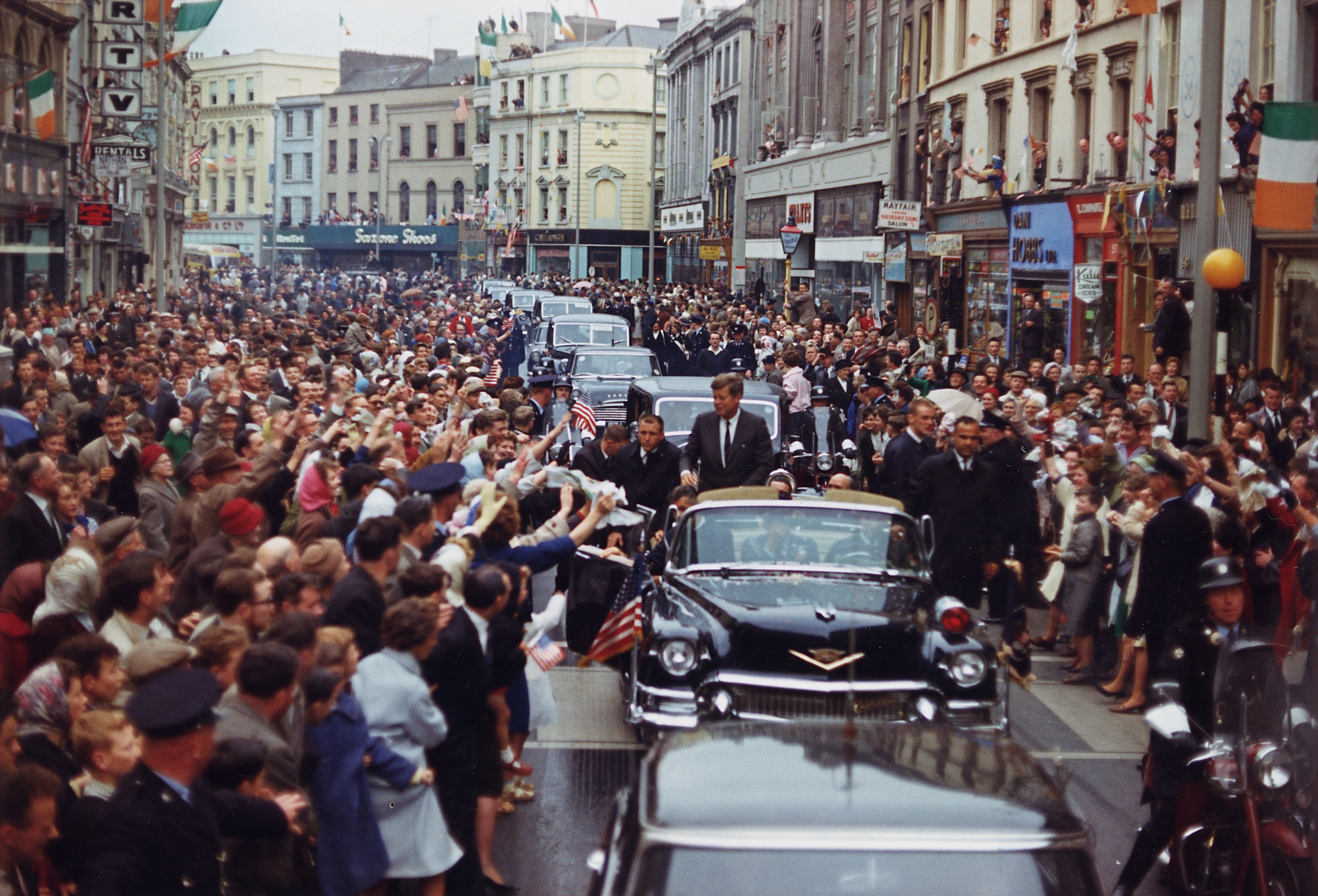
President John F. Kennedy in motorcade in Cork on 27 June 1963.

Irish immigration to the USA has played a large role in the culture of the United States. About 33.3 million Americans—10.5% of the total population—reported Irish ancestry in the 2013 American Community Survey conducted by the U.S. Census Bureau. Irish Americans have made many contributions to American culture and sport. Halloween is thought to have evolved from the ancient Celtic/Gaelic festival of Samhain, which was introduced in the American colonies by Irish settlers.

A number of the presidents of the United States have Irish origins. The extent of Irish heritage varies. For example, both of Andrew Jackson's parents were Irish-born, while George W. Bush has a rather distant Irish ancestry. Ronald Reagan's father was of Irish ancestry, while his mother also had some Irish ancestors. John F. Kennedy had Irish lineage on both sides. Within this group, only Kennedy was raised as a practicing Roman Catholic. Former President Barack Obama's Irish heritage originates from his Kansas-born mother, Ann Dunham, whose ancestry is Irish and English. President Joe Biden is also an Irish-American on both his parents sides and a practicing Roman Catholic like Kennedy.

Emigration, long a vital element in the U.S.–Irish relationship, declined significantly with Ireland's economic boom in the 1990s. For the first time in its modern history, Ireland experienced high levels of inward migration, a phenomenon with political, economic, and social consequences. However, Irish citizens do continue the common practice of taking temporary residence overseas for work or study, mainly in the US, UK, Australia and elsewhere in Europe, before returning to establish careers in Ireland. The US J-1 visa program, for example, remains a popular means for Irish youths to work temporarily in the United States.

== Resident diplomatic missions ==
of Ireland in the United States

- Washington, D.C. (Embassy)
- Atlanta (Consulate-General)
- Austin (Consulate-General)
- Boston (Consulate-General)
- Chicago (Consulate-General)
- Los Angeles (Consulate-General)
- Miami (Consulate-General)
- New York City (Consulate-General)
- San Francisco (Consulate-General)

of the United States in Ireland

- Dublin (Embassy)

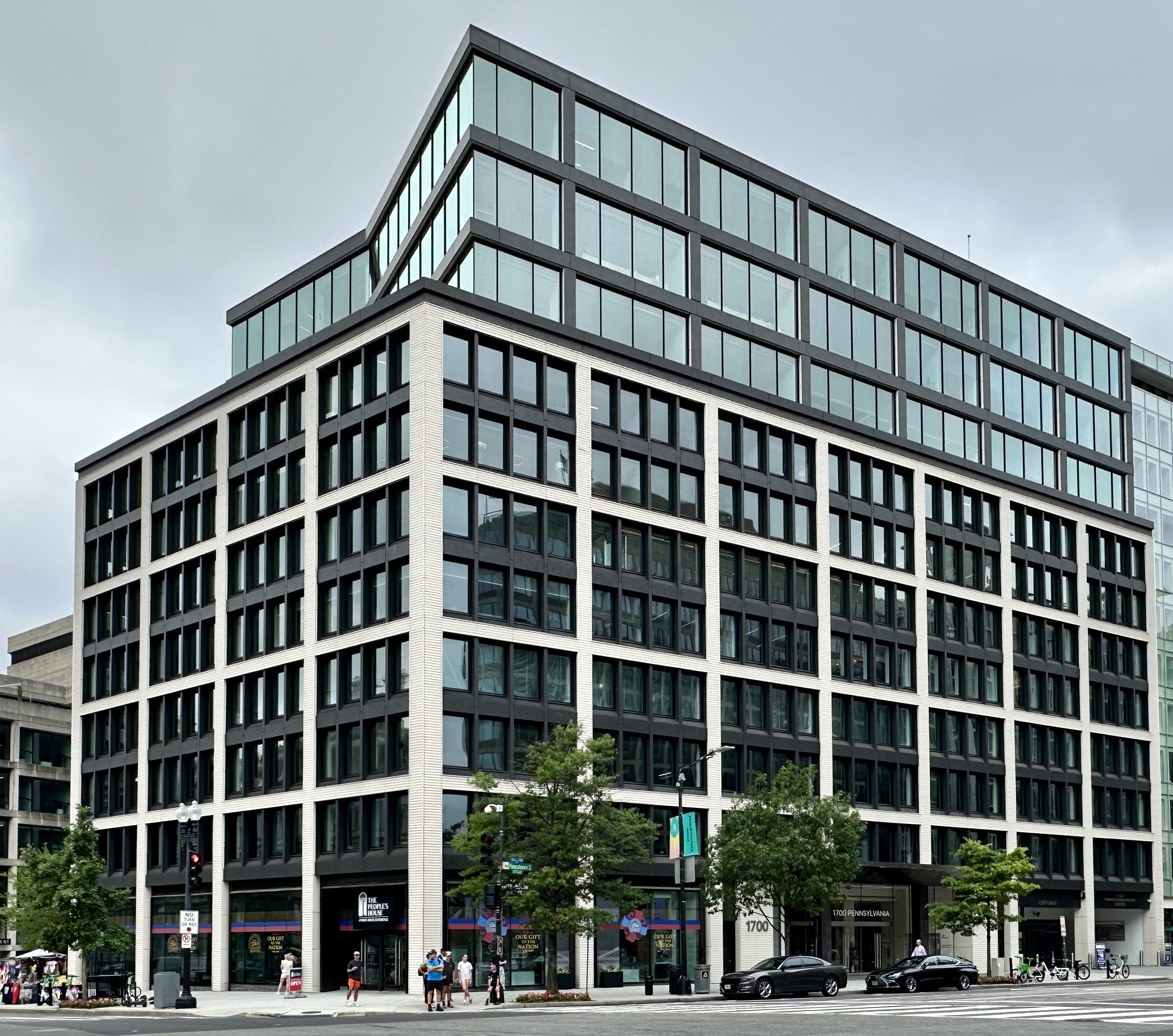
Building hosting the Embassy of Ireland in Washington, D.C.

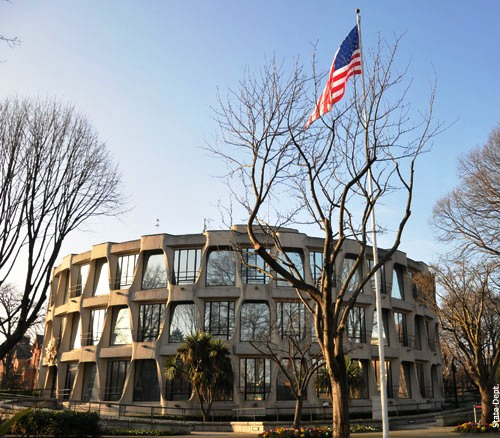
Embassy of the United States in Dublin

== See also ==
- United States Ambassador to Ireland
- Embassy of the United States in Dublin
- Deerfield Residence (United States Ambassador's Official Residence in Ireland)
- Ireland–NATO relations
- Irish Americans
- Foreign relations of the United States
- Foreign relations of the Republic of Ireland
- Irish diaspora
