= Embassy of Ireland, Washington, D.C. =

Diplomatic mission of Ireland to the United States

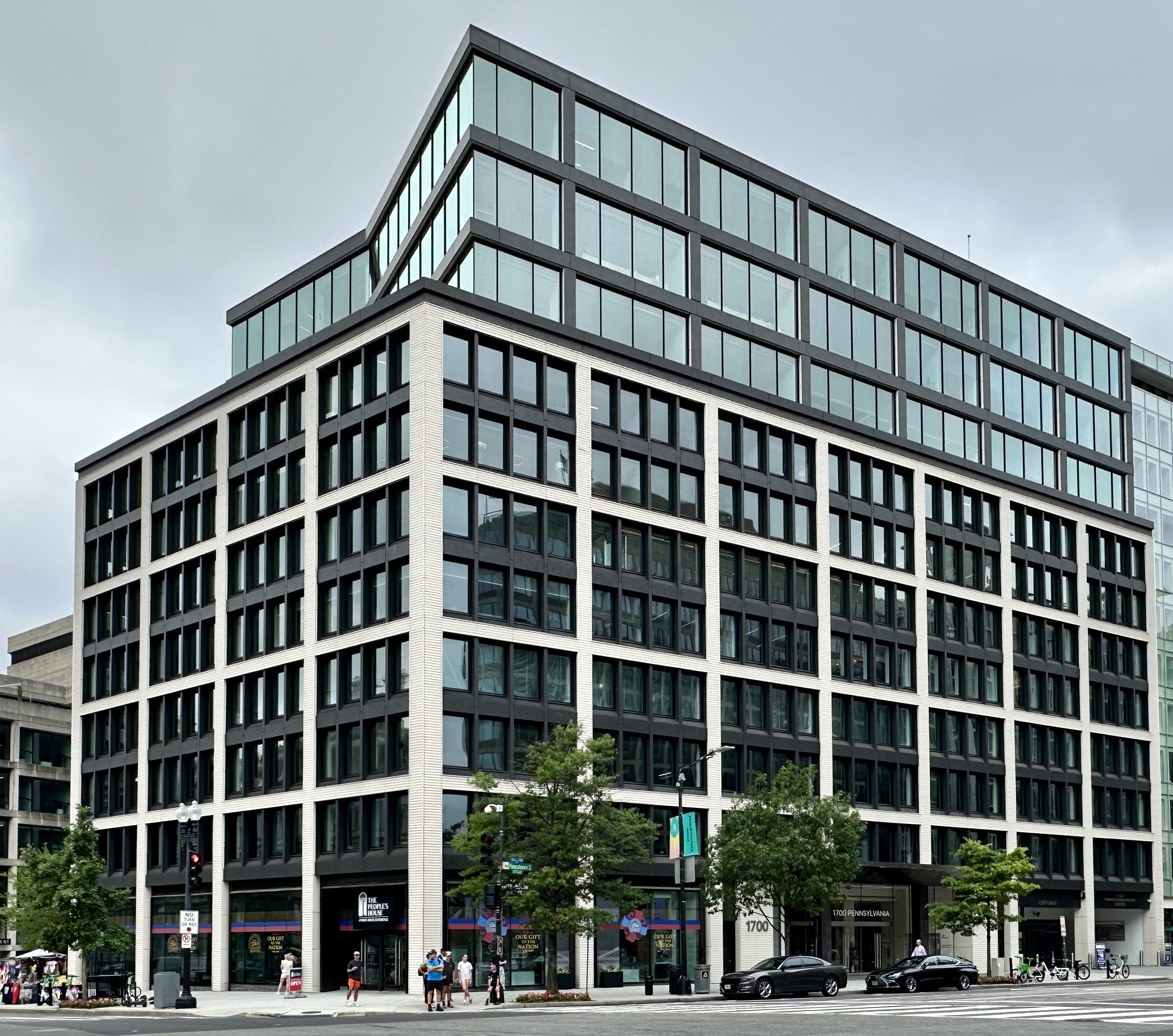
- 1700 Pennsylvania Avenue NW
- Location: Washington, D.C., U.S.
- Address: 1700 Pennsylvania Avenue NW
- Coordinates: 38°53′55.284″N 77°2′23.857″W
- Ambassador: Geraldine Byrne Nason
- Website: Embassy of Ireland, USA

The Embassy of Ireland in Washington, D.C. is the diplomatic mission of Ireland to the United States. It is located at 1700 Pennsylvania Avenue NW in The Mills Building near The White House.

The embassy also operates Consulates-General in Atlanta, Austin, Boston, Chicago, Los Angeles, Miami, New York City, and San Francisco.

As of December 2023, the current ambassador is Geraldine Byrne Nason.

== Building ==
=== Current location ===
The Irish Embassy is located in The Mills Building at 1700 Pennsylvania Avenue NW. It has been there since August 2025. This is a commercial office and retail building with many other tenant companies and organisations, the largest of which is a law firm. The building was originally constructed in 1966. A renovation was completed in 2022 which included the addition of three more floors, so the building now has 11 storeys.

=== Former location ===
Prior to the move, the Embassy was located in the Henrietta M. Halliday House on Massachusetts Avenue, in an area known as Embassy Row - named after the large number of embassies and diplomatic missions concentrated in the area.

The plot of land where the building stands was previously owned by former Republican Governor of Louisiana William P. Kellogg - who served as governor from 1873 until 1877. In May 1906, Kellogg sold the land to Henrietta M. Halliday for a total of $12,663. Henrietta subsequently applied and was issued a permit to build a dwelling on the land in 1908. The construction of the building was completed in June 1909.

This semi-detached limestone structure was designed by local Washington D.C. architect William Penn Cresson. The structure itself has two major facades, with each facade facing onto Sheridan Circle and Massachusetts Avenue. The exterior is designed in a Louis XVI Style, while the interior consists of an 18th-century French and English style. In 1911, the interior was extensively altered by Theodore Davis Boal's architecture firm, Boal & Brown. Real estate speculator Harry Wardman briefly owned the property from 1926 until it was sold in 1930 during the Great Depression.

The property was purchased by the Government of Ireland in 1949 for $72,000. It is currently for sale.

== Ambassador's Residence ==
The Irish Ambassador's residence is located at 2221 30th Street NW

It was purchased by the Irish Government for $12.25 million in December 2023, having been renting since 2021.

Previously, the Ambassador resided in the Frederic Delano House. Constructed in 1924, the building was built by Waddy Butler Wood for Frederic Adrian Delano, the uncle of former US President Franklin D. Roosevelt.

The Irish Government purchased the residence in 1965 for IR£102,000. The building was vacated in 2021 due to health and safety issues.

== Gallery ==
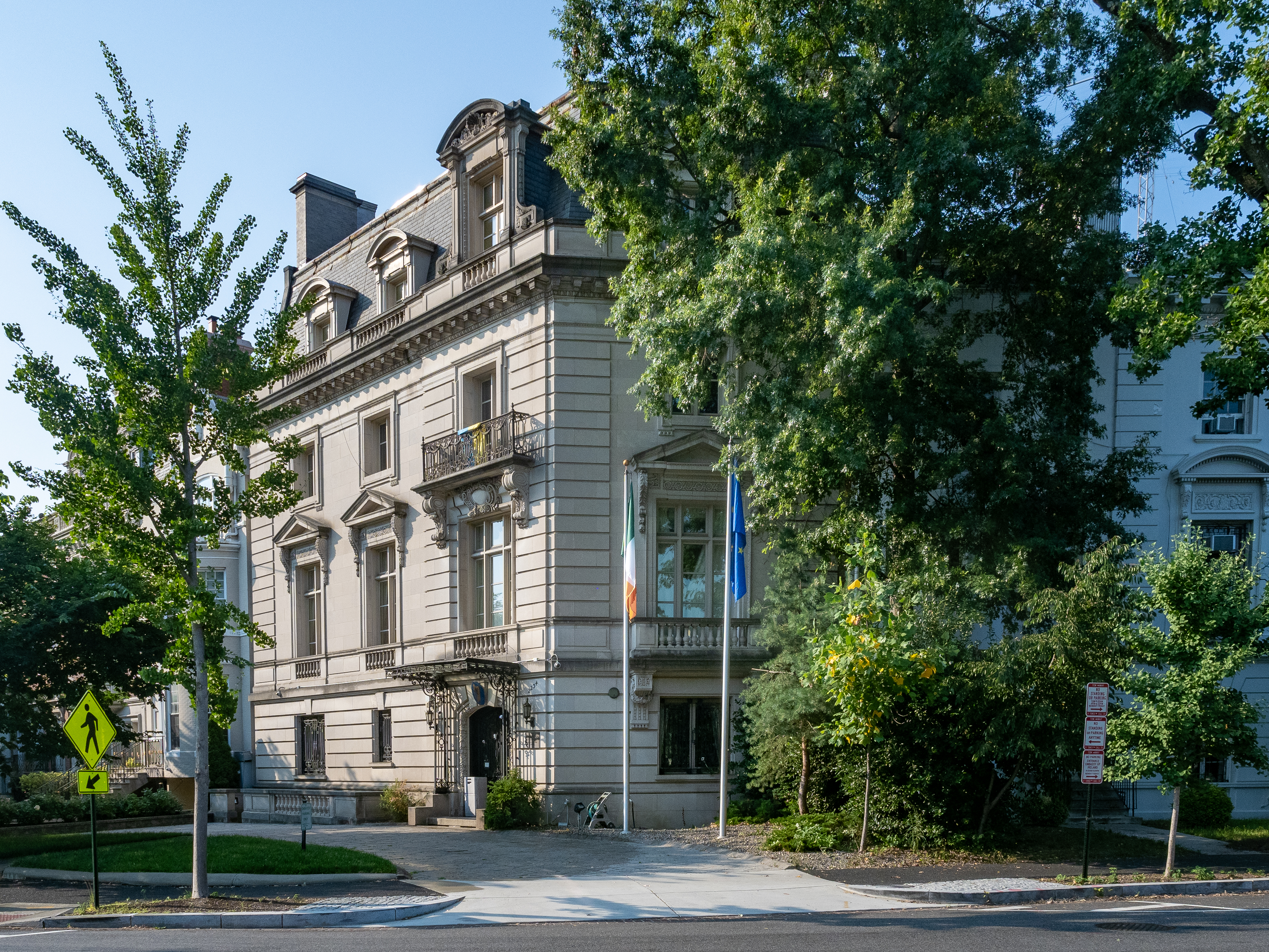
Former embassy building from 1949 to 2025.

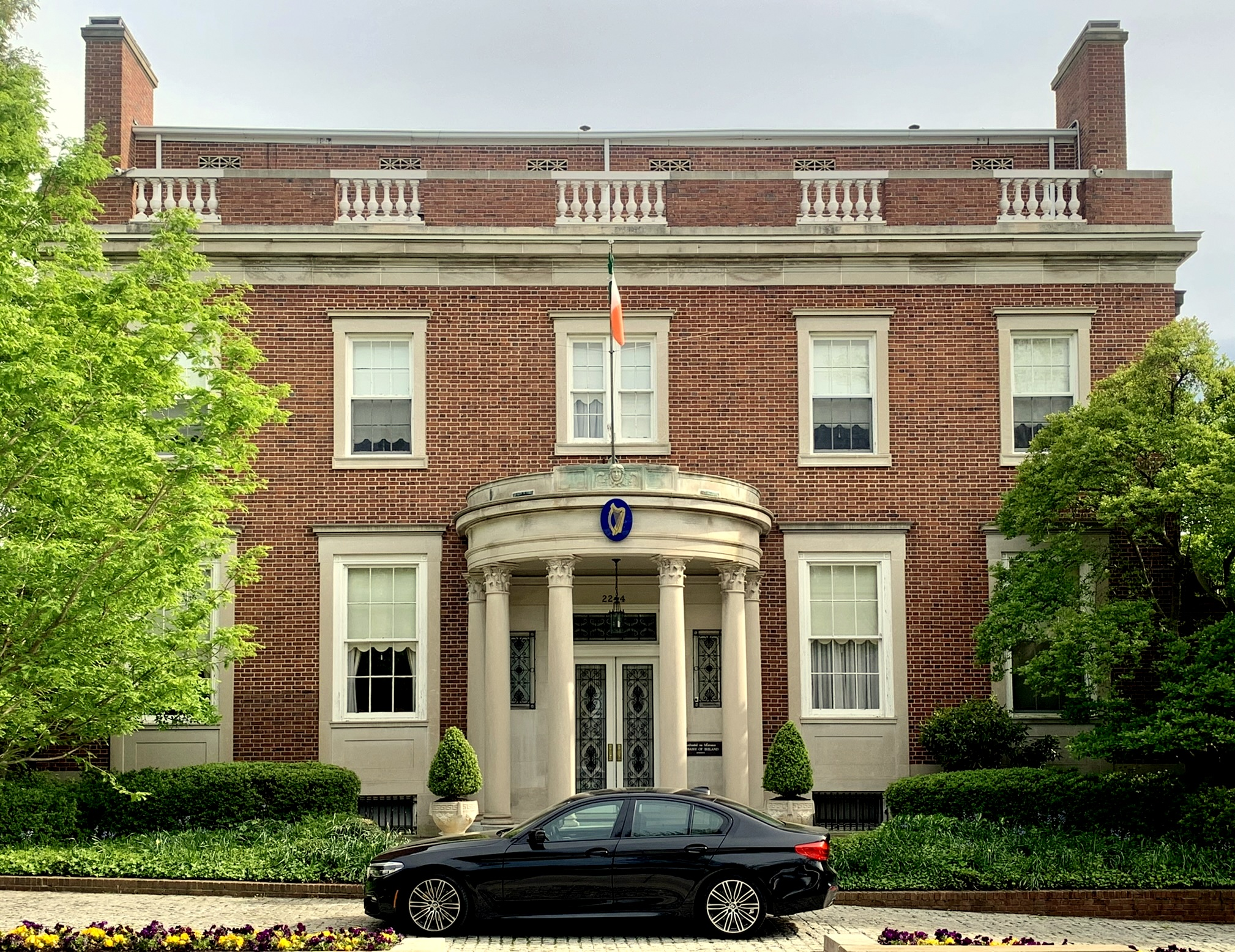
Former residence of the Ambassador until 2021, Frederic Delano House

== See also ==
- Ireland–United States relations
- Embassy of the United States, Dublin
- Deerfield Residence (U.S. Ambassador's Residence, Ireland)
- List of ambassadors of the United States to Ireland
