= Peter H. Dailey =

American executive and diplomat (1930–2018)

United States Ambassador to Ireland
- In office April 30, 1982 – January 15, 1984
- President: Ronald Reagan
- Preceded by: William V. Shannon
- Succeeded by: Robert F. Kane

Personal details
- Born: May 1, 1930 New Orleans, Louisiana, U.S.
- Died: March 11, 2018 (aged 87) Pasadena, California, U.S.
- Party: Republican
- Spouse: Jacqueline Ann Biggerstaff
- Children: 5
- Education: UCLA

Military service
- Allegiance: United States
- Branch/service: United States Navy

Peter H. Dailey (May 1, 1930 – March 11, 2018) was an American advertising executive, who served as United States Ambassador to Ireland (1982–1984).

Dailey was born in New Orleans in 1930; he attended UCLA where he played college football for the Bruins (1951–1953). He graduated from the UCLA Anderson School of Management in 1954, and served in the US Navy (1954–1956). He worked for Foote, Cone and Belding (1963–1964) and Campbell Ewald (1964–1968) before becoming chairman and CEO of his own company, Dailey International Group, in 1968. The company was acquired by Interpublic in 1983.

Dailey acted as principal media strategist for President Nixon during the 1972 election and for President Reagan during the 1980 election. He served on the Presidential Advisory Committee on Arms Control and Disarmament, and was counselor to William J. Casey, Director of Central Intelligence. At various times, he was a member of the board of directors of several companies, including Walt Disney Productions; Dailey's sister Patricia was married to Roy E. Disney.

In 1982, Dailey was appointed ambassador to Ireland by President Reagan. After confirmation by the Senate, he presented his credentials to Irish leaders on April 30, 1982. He had the official title of Ambassador Extraordinary and Plenipotentiary, and served in the role until January 15, 1984. In 1984, Dailey was awarded an honorary Doctor of Laws (LL.D.) degree from Whittier College. In 1989, Dailey was inducted to the UCLA Athletics Hall of Fame.

Dailey's wife, Jacqueline, died in 2016; the couple had five children. On March 11, 2018, Dailey died at his Pasadena home at the age of 87.

Diplomatic posts
Preceded by William V. Shannon	United States Ambassador to Ireland; 1982–1984	Succeeded by Robert F. Kane
