= List of ambassadors of the United States to Ireland =

Ambassador of the United States of America to Ireland
- Ambasadóir Stáit Aontaithe Mheiriceá go hÉirinn
- Seal of the United States Department of State

- Flag of a United States ambassador

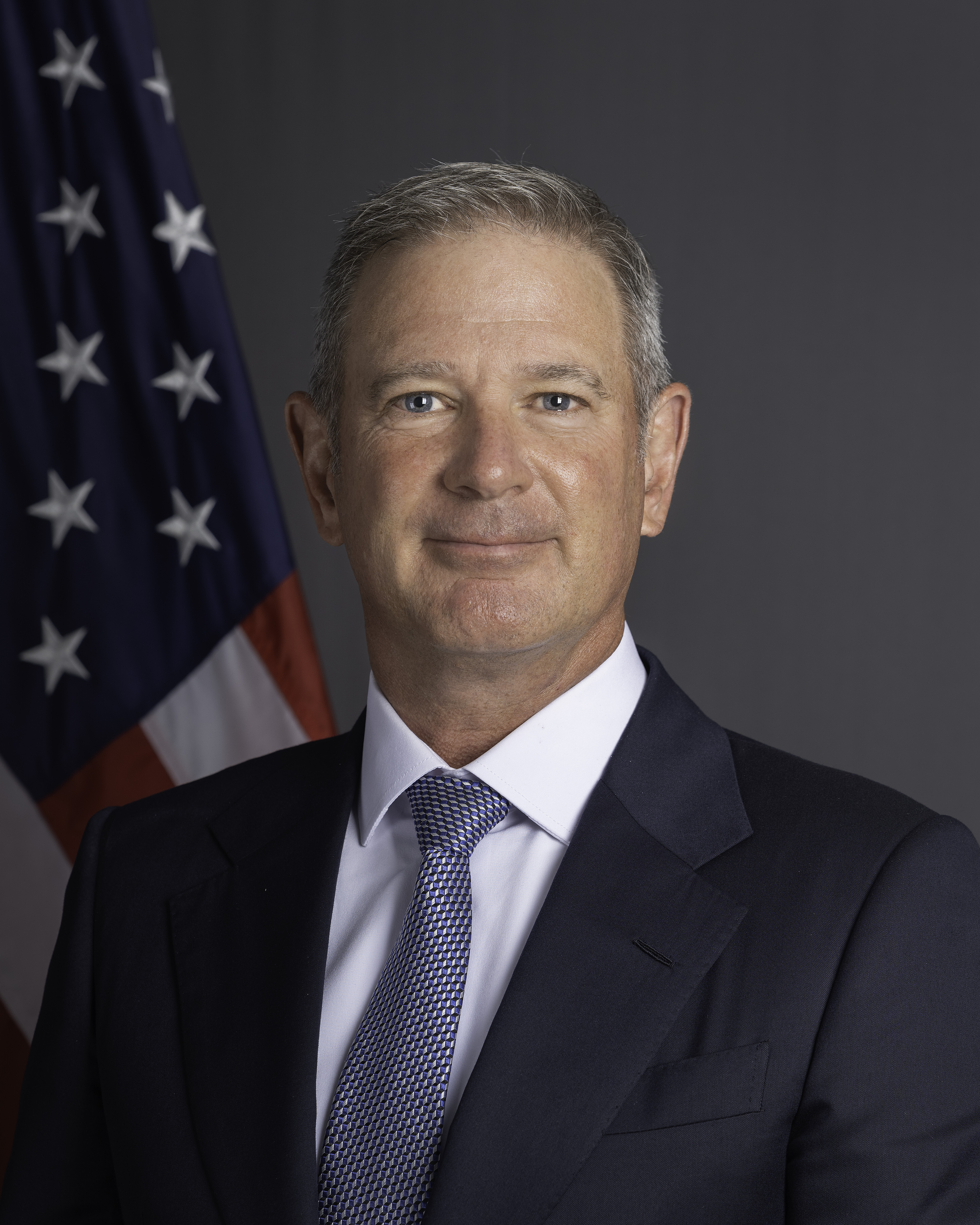
- Incumbent; Edward Sharp Walsh since July 1, 2025
- Residence: Deerfield Residence
- Nominator: The president of the United States
- Appointer: The president with Senate advice and consent
- Inaugural holder: Frederick A. Sterling (envoy); George A. Garrett (amb.)
- Formation: 1927 (envoy); 1950 (ambassador)
- Website: U.S. Embassy - Dublin

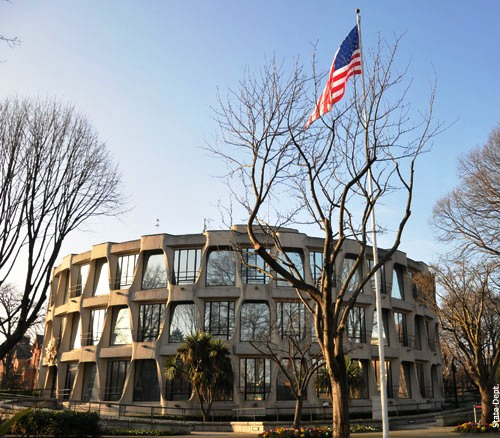
Embassy of the United States, Dublin

The United States ambassador to Ireland is the ambassador extraordinary and plenipotentiary from the United States of America to Ireland. It is considered a highly prestigious position within the United States Foreign Service. The current ambassador is Edward Walsh.

The chief of mission for the United States in Ireland held the title of envoy extraordinary and minister plenipotentiary from 1927 through 1950, and six people served in the role. Since 1950, the title has been ambassador, and 23 people have served in the role. Only the first envoy, Frederick A. Sterling, was a career Foreign Service Officer – other envoys, and all ambassadors to date, have been non-career appointees. The first four envoys were commissioned to the Irish Free State, prior to the formation of the State.

The ambassador and embassy staff at large work at the Ballsbridge Chancery of the Embassy of the United States, Dublin. Deerfield Residence is the official residence of the ambassador, located in the Phoenix Park, Dublin.

== Incumbent ==
The position was vacant from January 2017 through the end of June 2019, with Reece Smyth serving as the chargé d'affaires of the U.S. Embassy in Ireland. The prior ambassador, Kevin O'Malley, was nominated by President Barack Obama and served from October 2014 until the presidential inauguration of Donald Trump. In December 2016, it was reported that then president-elect Trump intended to name Brian P. Burns as the next ambassador to Ireland. However, in June 2017, Burns withdrew his name from consideration, due to ill health.

Edward F. Crawford, a businessman and entrepreneur from Ohio whose parents were from Cork, was approved to be the next ambassador by the Senate's foreign relations committee in May 2019, confirmed by a vote of the United States Senate on June 13, 2019, and sworn into office on June 26, 2019. He officially began his term as ambassador upon presentation of his credentials to President of Ireland Michael D. Higgins on July 1, 2019.

== Chiefs of mission ==
=== Envoys ===
Until 1950, the official title was Envoy Extraordinary and Minister Plenipotentiary.

No.	Name	Appointed	Presentation of credentials	Termination of mission	Days in office	Notes
1	Frederick A. Sterling	February 19, 1927	July 27, 1927	March 7, 1934	2415	^{E1}
2	W. W. McDowell	January 15, 1934	March 27, 1934	April 9, 1934	13	^{E1} ^{E2}
3	Alvin Mansfield Owsley	May 15, 1935	June 27, 1935	July 7, 1937	741	^{E1}
4	John Cudahy	May 28, 1937	August 23, 1937	January 15, 1940	875	^{E1}
5	David Gray	February 16, 1940	April 15, 1940	June 28, 1947	2630	
6	George A. Garrett	April 10, 1947	July 28, 1947	April 18, 1950	995	^{E3}

^E1 Commissioned to the Irish Free State
^E2 Died in office (while in Ireland)
^E3 Promoted to Ambassador

=== Ambassadors ===
Since 1950, the official title has been Ambassador Extraordinary and Plenipotentiary.

No.	Name	Appointed	Presentation of credentials	Termination of mission	Days in office	Notes
1	George A. Garrett	March 17, 1950	April 18, 1950	May 27, 1951	404	
2	Francis P. Matthews	July 6, 1951	October 22, 1951	September 7, 1952	321	^{A1}
3	William Howard Taft III	April 2, 1953	May 13, 1953	June 25, 1957	1504	
4	R. W. Scott McLeod	May 9, 1957	July 17, 1957	March 15, 1961	1337	
5	Grant Stockdale	March 29, 1961	May 17, 1961	July 7, 1962	416	
6	Matthew McCloskey	July 12, 1962	July 19, 1962	June 7, 1964	689	
7	Raymond R. Guest	March 11, 1965	April 28, 1965	June 7, 1968	1136	
8	Leo J. Sheridan	September 26, 1968	November 1, 1968	June 1, 1969	212	
9	John D. J. Moore	April 19, 1969	June 23, 1969	June 30, 1975	2198	^{A2}
10	Walter Curley	July 23, 1975	September 18, 1975	May 2, 1977	592	
11	William V. Shannon	June 22, 1977	July 20, 1977	June 7, 1981	1418	
12	Peter H. Dailey	March 15, 1982	April 30, 1982	January 15, 1984	625	
13	Robert F. Kane	February 28, 1984	March 6, 1984	May 29, 1985	449	
14	Margaret Heckler	December 17, 1985	January 30, 1986	August 20, 1989	1298	
15	Richard A. Moore	August 7, 1989	September 19, 1989	June 15, 1992	1000	
16	William H. G. FitzGerald	June 15, 1992	June 26, 1992	June 5, 1993	344	
17	Jean Kennedy Smith	June 17, 1993	June 24, 1993	September 17, 1998	1911	
18	Mike Sullivan	October 22, 1998	January 21, 1999	June 20, 2001	881	^{A3}
19	Richard Egan	August 29, 2001	September 10, 2001	January 31, 2003	508	
20	James C. Kenny	October 6, 2003	October 31, 2003	August 13, 2006	1017	^{A3}
21	Thomas C. Foley	August 28, 2006	October 18, 2006	January 22, 2009	827	^{A3}
22	Dan Rooney	July 1, 2009	July 3, 2009	December 14, 2012	1260	
23	Kevin O'Malley	September 18, 2014	October 8, 2014	January 20, 2017	835	^{A3}
24	Edward F. Crawford	June 13, 2019	July 1, 2019	January 19, 2021	568	^{A3}
25	Claire D. Cronin	December 18, 2021	February 10, 2022	January 20, 2025	1075	^{A3}
26	Edward Sharp Walsh	June 4, 2025	July 1, 2025	Incumbent	433	

^A1 Died in office (while in the United States)
^A2 Interred in Ireland
^A3 Still living

=== Other nominees ===
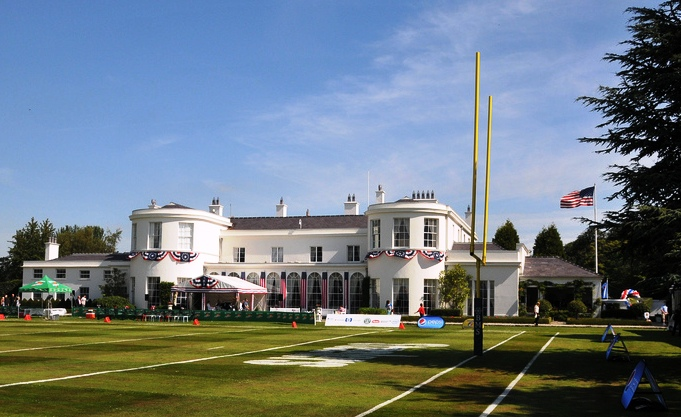
Deerfield Residence, official residence of the Ambassador

Appointed or nominated, but did not serve.

- W. W. McDowell

Appointment: September 13, 1933. Commissioned during a recess of the Senate; did not serve under this appointment. Reappointed in January 1934.

- William E. McCann

Note: Not commissioned; nomination of March 17, 1981, not acted upon by the Senate.

=== Chargé d’affaires ===
Interim chiefs of mission.

- Stuart A. Dwyer

September 2013 – October 2014

- Reece Smyth

January 2017 – June 2019

- Alexandra McKnight

January 2021 – February 2022

== See also ==
- Embassy of the United States, Dublin
- Deerfield Residence – Official residence of the ambassador
- Ireland–United States relations
- Foreign relations of Ireland
- Ambassadors of the United States
- Embassy of Ireland, Washington, D.C.
