= Leo J. Sheridan =

Chicago real estate executive and U.S. Ambassador to Ireland

United States Ambassador to Ireland
- In office November 1, 1968 – June 1, 1969
- President: Lyndon B. Johnson
- Preceded by: Raymond R. Guest
- Succeeded by: John D. J. Moore

Personal details
- Born: April 24, 1897 Chicago, Illinois, U.S.
- Died: November 10, 1975 (aged 78) Lake Forest, Illinois, U.S.
- Spouse(s): Irene Leader (d. 1963); Beatrice Rice Gillick (d. 1990)
- Children: 6

Military service
- Allegiance: United States
- Branch/service: United States Army
- Battles/wars: World War I

Leo John Sheridan (April 24, 1897 – November 10, 1975) was a Chicago real estate executive, and United States Ambassador to Ireland (1968–1969).

Sheridan was born in Chicago, graduating from Lane Technical High School and then attending Kent College of Law and the University of Chicago. He served in the Army Signal Corps during World War I. In 1929, he founded his own real estate company – L.J. Sheridan & Co. – serving as president until becoming chairman in 1952. Active in the Catholic Church, he was named a Knight of St. Gregory in 1957.

In 1968, Sheridan was appointed ambassador to Ireland by President Johnson. After confirmation by the Senate, he presented his credentials to Irish leaders on November 1, 1968. He had the official title of Ambassador Extraordinary and Plenipotentiary, and served in the role until June 1, 1969. Sheridan died in 1975 in Lake Forest, Illinois.

Diplomatic posts
Preceded by Raymond R. Guest	United States Ambassador to Ireland; 1968–1969	Succeeded by John D. J. Moore
