= Raymond R. Guest =

American businessman, diplomat, and racehorse owner

Raymond Richard Guest OBE

United States Ambassador to Ireland
- In office March 11, 1965 – June 7, 1968
- President: Lyndon B. Johnson
- Preceded by: Matthew H. McCloskey
- Succeeded by: Leo J. Sheridan

Member of the Virginia Senate from the 24th district
- In office January 14, 1948 – January 29, 1953
- Preceded by: Jacob A. Garber
- Succeeded by: George S. Aldhizer

Personal details
- Born: November 25, 1907 New York City, U.S.
- Died: December 31, 1991 (aged 84) Fredericksburg, Virginia, U.S.
- Party: Democratic
- Spouses: Elizabeth Polk (m. 1935, divorced) Ellen Tuck French Astor (after 1953) Princess Caroline Murat (m. 1960)
- Children: 5, including Andy
- Parent(s): Frederick E. Guest; Amy Phipps
- Relatives: Winston Guest (brother); 1st Viscount Wimborne (uncle); Henry Phipps Jr. (grandfather); 1st Baron Wimborne (grandfather)
- Education: Phillips Andover
- Alma mater: Yale College
- Occupation: Soldier, businessman, statesman, polo player, racehorse owner/breeder

Military service
- Allegiance: United States
- Branch/service: United States Navy
- Rank: Commander
- Unit: Office of Strategic Services
- Battles/wars: World War II
- Awards: Bronze Star; Legion of Merit; Croix de Guerre

Raymond Richard Guest OBE (November 25, 1907 – December 31, 1991) was an American businessman, thoroughbred race horse owner and polo player. From 1965 to 1968, he was United States Ambassador to Ireland.

== Early life ==
Guest was born on November 25, 1907, in Manhattan to Frederick Edward Guest (1875–1937), a British Cabinet minister and his American wife, Amy Phipps (1873–1959). Guest's siblings were Winston Frederick Churchill Guest (1906–1982), also a polo-player whose second wife was C. Z. Guest (1920–2003), the actress and socialite, and Diana Guest Manning (1909–1994). He attended Phillips Andover and graduated from Yale in 1931.

His maternal grandfather was Henry Phipps Jr. (1839–1930), Andrew Carnegie's business partner in Carnegie Steel Company. His paternal grandfather was Ivor Guest, 1st Baron Wimborne (1835–1914) and his great-grandfather was John Spencer-Churchill, 7th Duke of Marlborough, making Guest a first cousin once removed of Prime Minister Winston Churchill.

== Career ==
=== Military career ===
During World War II he served with the United States Navy. He served on mine sweepers and was made head of the Navy section of the Office of Strategic Services in London, England. By the time he left the military in 1946, he had risen to the rank of Commander. He was awarded the Bronze Star and a Legion of Merit, both with combat devices; the Croix de Guerre with star; the Order of the British Empire; the Norwegian Cross, and the Danish Defense Medal.

=== Political career ===
Guest was a member of the Senate of Virginia from 1947 to 1953, and served as the United States Ambassador to Ireland from 1965 to 1968.

=== Thoroughbred racing ===
In the United States, members of Raymond Guest's mother's family have been major figures in the sport of thoroughbred racing for many decades. In England, his sister, Diana Guest Manning, owned and raced a horse she named Be My Guest, who was a conditions race winner in England and Ireland as well as the leading sire in Great Britain and Ireland in 1982. Raymond Guest also owned thoroughbreds which he raced in England, Ireland, France and the United States. In Ireland his flat racehorses were trained by Vincent O'Brien and his National Hunt horses by Dan Moore. His racing colours were chocolate, pale blue hoops and cap. Guest is one of only four owners to win both the Epsom Derby and the Grand National, the others being King Edward VII, when Prince of Wales, Dorothy Paget and Jim Joel.

Raymond Guest was the British flat racing champion owner in 1968. Among hiss successful horses in flat racing were Larkspur, winner of the 1962 Epsom Derby; Sir Ivor, winner of the 1968 2,000 Guineas, Epsom Derby and Washington, D.C. International.

He also owned steeplechase racers. His most outstanding was L'Escargot, a U.S. Racing Hall of Fame inductee who was voted the 1969 U.S. Steeplechase Horse of the Year and who then raced in England where he won the Cheltenham Gold Cup in 1970 and 1971 and the Grand National in 1975.

In the United States, Raymond Guest was a member of The Jockey Club and voted President of the Virginia Thoroughbred Association in 1958. The best horse to carry his Powhatan Stable colours in American flat racing was Tom Rolfe, winner of the 1965 Preakness Stakes who earned U.S. 3-Year-Old Champion Colt or Gelding honors.

Both he and his brother Winston Frederick Churchill Guest were polo players. Raymond Guest twice won the U.S. Open as part of the Templeton team, and was posthumously inducted into the Museum of Polo and Hall of Fame in 2006.

== Personal life ==
In 1935, he married first to Elizabeth ("Lily") Polk of Dark Harbor, Maine, the daughter of Frank Polk and a relative of U.S. president, James K. Polk, with whom he had three children:

- Elizabeth Guest, who married Edward Beach Condon in 1958, and after their divorce, to George Stevens Jr. in 1965.
- Raymond Richard "Andy" Guest Jr. (1939–2001), who married Mary Scott Derrick.
- Virginia Guest (Valentine)

In 1953, he married Ellen Tuck French Astor (1915–1974), who had previously been married to John Jacob Astor VI from 1934 to 1943. She was the elder daughter of Francis Ormond "Frank" French II (1888–1962) and Eleanor Livingston Burrill (1891–1974), and was a first cousin of Rhode Island Governor William Henry Vanderbilt III (1901–1981). They later divorced.

In 1960, he married for the third and final time to Princess Caroline "Caro" Cécile Alexandrine Jeanne Murat (1923–2012), daughter of Prince Alexandre Murat (1889–1926) and granddaughter of Joachim Napoléon Murat, 5th Prince Murat (1856–1932), She was previously married to American Capt. August Van Hartz in 1945. Together, they had two children:

- Achille Murat Guest, who married Capucine Motte and Judith Wall
- Laetitia Amelia Guest (Oppenheim)

Raymond Guest died of pneumonia on December 31, 1991, in Mary Washington Hospital in Fredericksburg, Virginia.

Diplomatic posts
Preceded by Matthew H. McCloskey	United States; Ambassador to Ireland; 1965–1968	Succeeded by Leo J. Sheridan
