= Frederick A. Sterling =

American diplomat

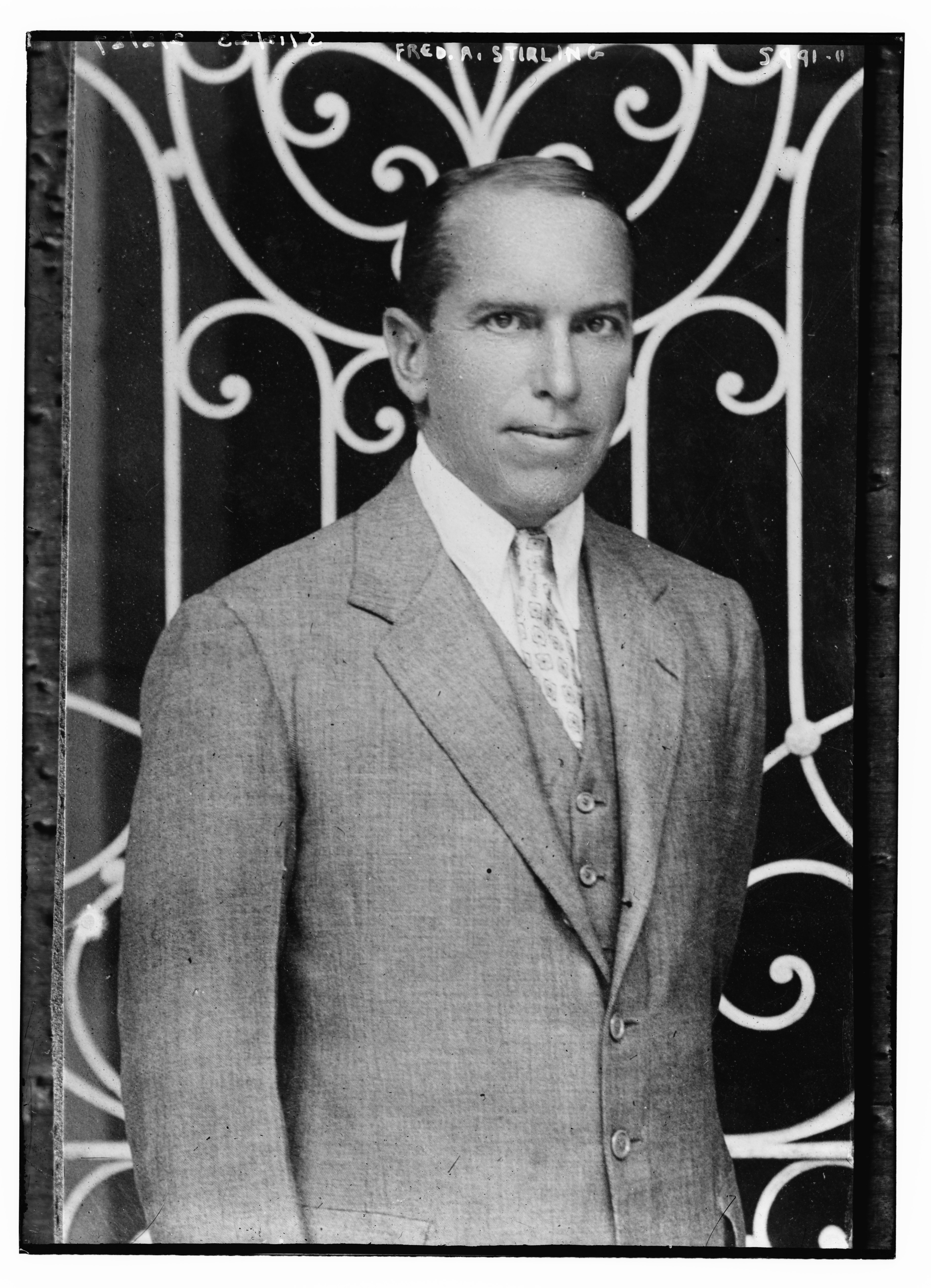

United States Envoy to the Irish Free State
- In office July 27, 1927 – March 7, 1934
- President: Calvin Coolidge; Herbert Hoover; Franklin D. Roosevelt
- Preceded by: post created
- Succeeded by: W. W. McDowell

United States Envoy to Bulgaria
- In office April 3, 1934 – June 30, 1936
- President: Franklin D. Roosevelt
- Preceded by: Henry W. Shoemaker
- Succeeded by: Ray Atherton

United States Envoy to Sweden
- In office September 26, 1938 – July 14, 1941
- President: Franklin D. Roosevelt
- Preceded by: Fred Morris Dearing
- Succeeded by: Michelangelo Rodriguez

Personal details
- Born: August 13, 1876 St. Louis, Missouri, U.S.
- Died: April 21, 1957 (aged 80) Washington, D.C., U.S.
- Spouse: Dorothy Williams (d. 1950)
- Children: 3
- Education: Harvard University

Frederick Augustine Sterling (August 13, 1876 – April 21, 1957) was a United States diplomat. In 1927, he was the first person appointed US minister to the Irish Free State, a role he served in until 1934. He later served as US minister to Bulgaria and Sweden.

== Biography ==
Sterling was born in St. Louis and was an 1898 graduate of Harvard University. After working on a ranch in Texas and manufacturing woolen goods, he became a career Foreign Service Officer in 1911. Assignments included work in Peru, China, Russia, and England.

In 1927, Sterling was the first person appointed US minister to the Irish Free State. After confirmation by the Senate, and presentation of his credentials to Irish leaders W. T. Cosgrave and Timothy Healy in July, he held the formal title of Envoy Extraordinary and Minister Plenipotentiary.

Sterling's post in Ireland ended in 1934, when he became US minister to Bulgaria, a position he remained in until 1936. In 1937, he was appointed to minister roles for both Latvia and Estonia, however he "did not proceed to post." In 1938, he became US minister to Sweden, and he remained in that role until 1941.

Sterling owned a summer house in Newport, Rhode Island; he was married, with two sons and one daughter. He died in Washington, D.C., in 1957.

Diplomatic posts
Preceded by post created	United States Envoy to the Irish Free State; 1927–1934	Succeeded by W. W. McDowell
Preceded by Henry W. Shoemaker	United States Envoy to Bulgaria; 1934–1936	Succeeded by Ray Atherton
Preceded by Fred Morris Dearing	United States Envoy to Sweden; 1938–1941	Succeeded by Michelangelo Rodriguez
