= John D. J. Moore =

American lawyer, business executive and ambassador

United States Ambassador to Ireland
- In office June 23, 1969 – June 30, 1975
- President: Richard Nixon
- Preceded by: Leo J. Sheridan
- Succeeded by: Walter Curley

Personal details
- Born: November 10, 1910 New York City, U.S.
- Died: September 12, 1988 (aged 77) New York City, U.S.
- Party: Republican
- Spouse: Mary Foote (d. 1975)
- Children: 6
- Relatives: Richard A. Moore (brother)
- Education: Yale University; Yale Law School

John Denis Joseph Moore Jr. (November 10, 1910 – September 12, 1988) was an American lawyer, business executive, and United States Ambassador to Ireland (1969–1975).

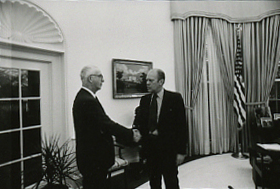
Moore with President Gerald Ford in 1975

Moore was a graduate of Yale University and Yale Law School. He worked for White & Case before becoming assistant corporation counsel and then assistant district attorney for New York City. He later returned to private business and worked for W. R. Grace and Company. He traveled to South America and the Soviet Union in 1958 and 1959 with then Vice President Richard Nixon, in an advisory role.

In 1969, Moore was appointed ambassador to Ireland by President Nixon. After confirmation by the Senate, he presented his credentials to Irish leaders on June 23, 1969. He had the official title of Ambassador Extraordinary and Plenipotentiary, and served in the role until June 30, 1975. His brother, Richard A. Moore, later served as ambassador to Ireland under President George H. W. Bush.

While in Ireland, Moore's daughter Margaret died in October 1974, and his wife, Mary Foote Moore, died in January 1975 – both were buried in Dublin. Moore died of bone cancer in Manhattan in 1988, and he was interred in Ireland next to his wife and daughter in Deans Grange Cemetery.

Diplomatic posts
Preceded by Leo J. Sheridan	United States Ambassador to Ireland; 1969–1975	Succeeded by Walter Curley
