= William H. G. FitzGerald =

American diplomat (1909–2006)

United States Ambassador to Ireland
- In office June 26, 1992 – June 5, 1993
- President: George H. W. Bush; Bill Clinton
- Preceded by: Richard A. Moore
- Succeeded by: Jean Kennedy Smith

Personal details
- Born: December 23, 1909 Boston, Massachusetts, U.S.
- Died: January 5, 2006 (aged 96) Washington, D. C., U.S.
- Party: Republican
- Spouse: Annelise Petschek
- Children: 2
- Education: United States Naval Academy

Military service
- Allegiance: United States
- Branch/service: United States Navy
- Battles/wars: World War II

William Henry Gerald FitzGerald (December 23, 1909 – January 5, 2006) was an American investor and philanthropist, who served as United States Ambassador to Ireland from 1992 to 1993.

== Biography ==
FitzGerald was born in Boston in 1909, and grew up in nearby Wakefield, Massachusetts. After attending the Severn School in Maryland, he entered the United States Naval Academy in 1927 and graduated in 1931. He attended submarine school, and was later assigned to Pearl Harbor; he left the Navy in 1934 to attend Harvard Law School. After some successful investing, FitzGerald decided to leave law school to learn corporate finance; he worked for the Borden Milk Company until being recalled by the Navy in April 1941.

FitzGerald conducted submarine research during World War II, and left the Navy in 1946. Until 1957, he worked in the field of metallurgy, including founding and selling a company. Former governor of Massachusetts Christian Herter then had him appointed to a position within the International Cooperation Administration. In 1960, FitzGerald left the ICA to support the presidential campaign of Richard Nixon. After Nixon lost the 1960 presidential election, FitzGerald returned to private business, and became chairman of a hydrofoil company; during these years he also invested in the stock market. FitzGerald later held positions within the International Center of Investment Disputes (1975–1982), the President's Advisory Board on International Investments (1976–1978), and the Atlantic Council starting in 1976.

After the 1988 election of George H. W. Bush, FitzGerald was appointed vice chairman of the African Development Fund. In 1992, he was appointed ambassador to Ireland by President Bush. His nomination caused some controversy, due to his age (FitzGerald was 80 at the time) and some misstatements he made during his confirmation hearing. His nomination was confirmed by the Senate, and he presented his credentials to President of Ireland Mary Robinson on June 26, 1992. He had the official title of Ambassador Extraordinary and Plenipotentiary, and served until June 5, 1993.

FitzGerald died at George Washington University Hospital on January 5, 2006, of an aortic aneurysm. The William H.G. FitzGerald Tennis Center in Washington is named in his honor.

== See also ==
- United States Ambassador to Ireland

Diplomatic posts
Preceded by Richard A. Moore	United States Ambassador to Ireland; 1992–1993	Succeeded by Jean Kennedy Smith
