= Richard A. Moore =

American lawyer and diplomat (1914–1995)

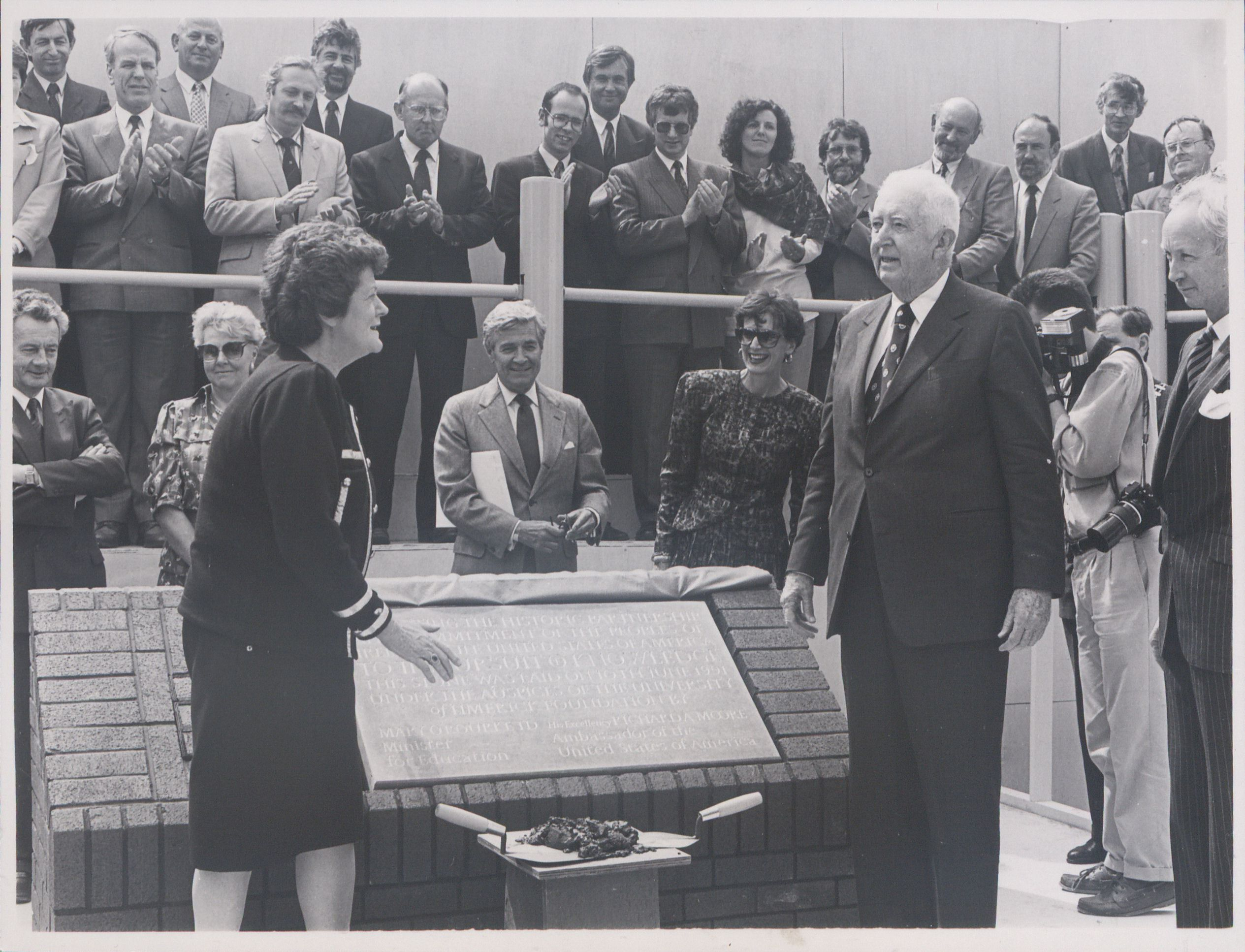
- Moore, standing at right of center, at the University of Limerick in 1991

United States Ambassador to Ireland
- In office September 19, 1989 – June 15, 1992
- President: George H. W. Bush
- Preceded by: Margaret Heckler
- Succeeded by: William H. G. FitzGerald

Personal details
- Born: January 23, 1914 Albany, New York, U.S.
- Died: January 27, 1995 (aged 81) Washington, D.C., U.S.
- Party: Republican
- Spouse(s): Jane G. Swift; Esther Horstkotte Jantzen
- Children: 5
- Relatives: John D. J. Moore (brother)
- Education: Yale University; Yale Law School

Military service
- Allegiance: United States
- Branch/service: United States Army
- Battles/wars: World War II

Richard Anthony Moore (January 23, 1914 – January 27, 1995) was an American lawyer and communications executive, who served as special counsel to President Richard Nixon and was United States Ambassador to Ireland (1989–1992).

Moore became a special counsel to President Nixon in 1971, and in July 1973 was a witness to the Senate committee investigating the Watergate scandal. After leaving the administration he later became founder and associate producer of The McLaughlin Group, and was later ambassador to Ireland under President George H. W. Bush. His brother, John D. J. Moore, had served as ambassador to Ireland under Presidents Nixon and Ford. Moore died of prostate cancer in Washington, D.C., in 1995.

Diplomatic posts
Preceded by Margaret Heckler	United States Ambassador to Ireland; 1989–1992	Succeeded by William H. G. FitzGerald
