= William V. Shannon =

American journalist, author and ambassador

United States Ambassador to Ireland
- In office July 20, 1977 – June 7, 1981
- President: Jimmy Carter
- Preceded by: Walter Curley
- Succeeded by: Peter H. Dailey

Personal details
- Born: August 24, 1927 Worcester, Massachusetts, U.S.
- Died: September 27, 1988 (aged 61) Boston, Massachusetts, U.S.
- Spouse: Elizabeth McNelly
- Children: 3
- Education: Clark University; Harvard University

William Vincent Shannon (August 24, 1927 – September 27, 1988) was an American journalist, author, and United States Ambassador to Ireland from 1977 to 1981 under President Jimmy Carter.

== Biography ==
Born in Worcester, Massachusetts, Shannon earned a bachelor's degree from Clark University in 1947, and a master's degree in history from Harvard University in 1948.

From 1951 to 1964, Shannon was a Washington correspondent and columnist for the New York Post, and from 1964 until 1977, he was an editorial writer for The New York Times. He also authored the books The American Irish: A Political and Social Portrait (1964), The Heir Apparent (1967), and They Could Not Trust the King (1974). He was coauthor of The Truman Merry-Go-Round (1950) and published many articles.

Shannon served on the board of directors of the American Irish Foundation. In 1975 he received the Gold Medal of the Éire Society of Boston for service to literature. He was an associate fellow of Yale University's Morse College from 1966, and in 1961–62 was fellow-in-residence at the Center for the Study of Democratic Institutions in Santa Barbara, California.

In 1977, Shannon was appointed ambassador to Ireland by President Carter. After confirmation by the Senate, he presented his credentials to Irish leaders on July 20, 1977, and had the official title of Ambassador Extraordinary and Plenipotentiary. He served as ambassador until June 7, 1981.

In 1981, Shannon joined Boston University and taught an American Presidency course and conducted graduate seminars in journalism; he also wrote for The Boston Globe. Shannon died in Boston in 1988 of lymphoma, at age 61. Boston University established the William V. Shannon Memorial Fellowships in his memory, to benefit Irish citizens pursuing graduate study at the university.

== Works ==
- Allen, Robert S.; Shannon, William V. (1950). The Truman Merry-Go-Round. New York City: Vanguard Press. OCLC 247743294.
- Shannon, William V. (1963). The American Irish. New York City: Macmillan Publishers. OCLC 872955564.
- Shannon, William V. (1974). They Could Not Trust The King. Stanley Tretick (photographer). New York City: Collier Books. ISBN 9780020747406. OCLC 935525.
- Shannon, William V. (1967). The Heir Apparent: Robert Kennedy and the Struggle for Power. New York City: Macmillan Publishers. OCLC 492135017.
- Shannon, William V. (1985). A Quiet Broker?. New York City: Priority Press. ISBN 9780870781636. OCLC 924817648.

Diplomatic posts
Preceded by Walter J.P. Curley Jr.	United States Ambassador to Ireland; 1977–1981	Succeeded by Peter H. Dailey
