= Deerfield Residence =

Residence of United States Ambassador to Ireland

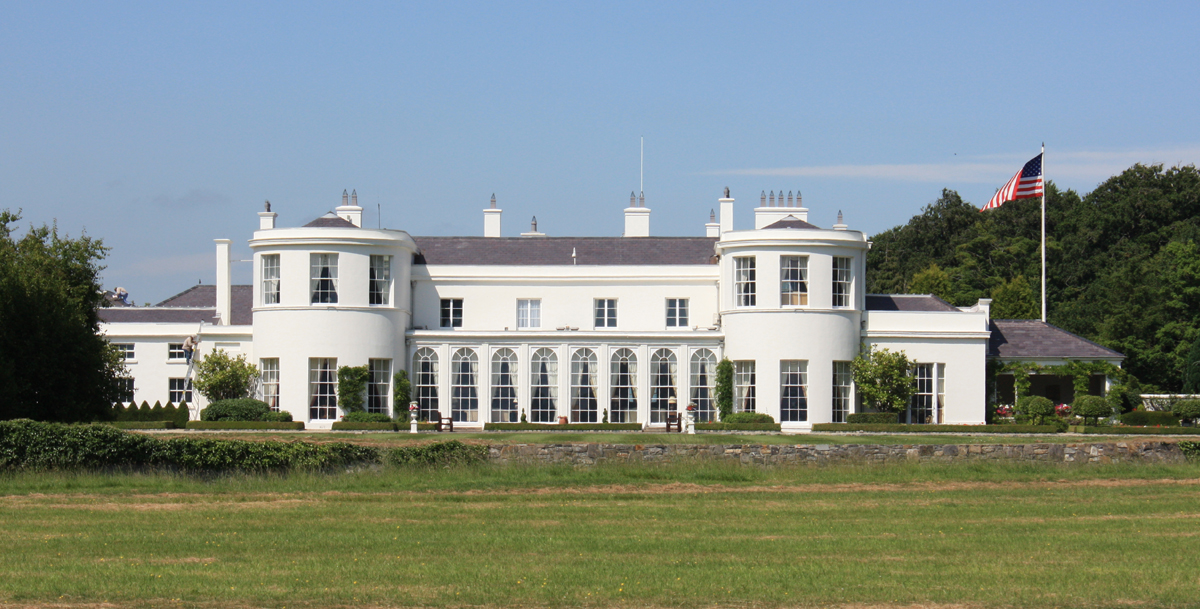
- Deerfield Residence

- Location within Dublin
- Former names: Chief Secretary's Lodge

General information
- Architectural style: Georgian
- Location: Chesterfield Avenue, Phoenix Park, Dublin, Ireland
- Coordinates: 53°21′29.5″N 6°19′59.3″W
- Current tenants: United States Ambassador to Ireland (since 1927)
- Construction started: 1774
- Completed: 1776
- Owner: United States government (since 2013)

Website
- U.S. Ambassador's Residence in Dublin

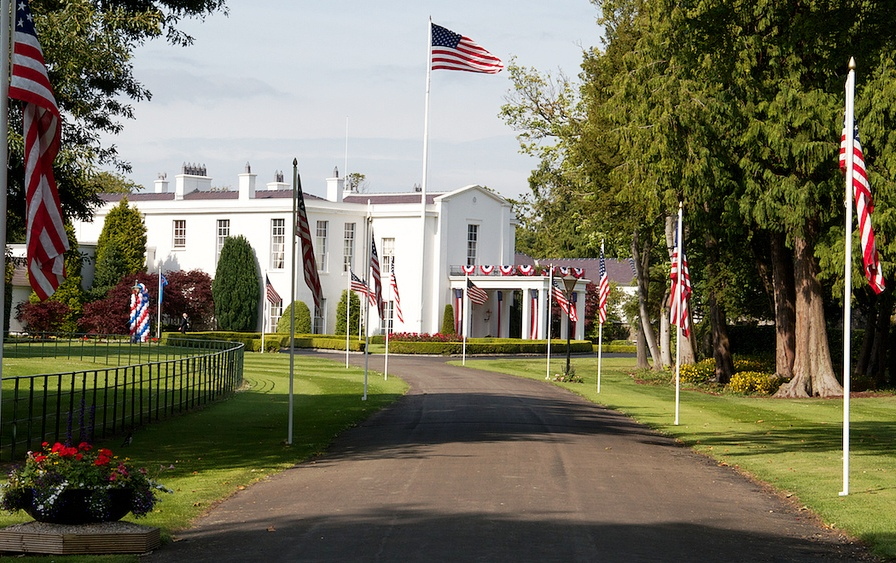
Entrance to the Residence

The Deerfield Residence (formerly the Chief Secretary's Lodge) is the official residence of the United States Ambassador to Ireland in Phoenix Park, Dublin.

The premises has been the Ambassador's Official Residence since 1927, and was previously the Embassy of the United States of America in Ireland. It is a large 18th-century building, sitting on 62 acres (250,000 m^{2}) of private grounds in the centre of Phoenix Park. It sits across from Áras an Uachtaráin, the official residence of the President of Ireland.

Edward Sharp Walsh has been the U.S. ambassador to Ireland since 2025.

== History ==
=== Chief Secretary's Lodge ===
The residence was originally built by John Blaquiere, 1st Baron de Blaquiere, then Chief Secretary for Ireland, and taken over to become the Chief Secretary's Dublin residence in the late 18th century. Until the abolition of the post in 1922 it served as the official residence in Dublin of the Chief Secretary, the second-in-command (and de facto head) in the Lord Lieutenant of Ireland's administration. The Chief Secretary played a role akin to a Prime Minister in the administration. Winston Churchill—later to be Prime Minister of the United Kingdom–spent some of his childhood living in the Phoenix Park. Following the establishment of the Irish Free State, a number of possible uses for the empty residences in the Phoenix Park were considered, from sale or demolition to turning the Chief Secretary's Lodge into a residence for the President of the Executive Council (Prime Minister). In the mid-1920s plans were made to move the Governor-General of the Irish Free State, Timothy Michael Healy, from his large and costly Viceregal Lodge (now Áras an Uachtaráin) official residence to the smaller Chief Secretary's Lodge across the road. Healy however expressed a wish that, if he was to move at all, it should be to his private home in Chapelizod. Believing that Healy's home was too exposed and a security risk, the Executive Council of the Irish Free State (cabinet) chose to leave Healy in the Viceregal Lodge. Instead the Chief Secretary's Lodge was rented on a ten-year lease to the United States government, to become a combined ambassador's residence and embassy, on 19 February 1927.

In January 1938, with the American lease nearly up, the Irish Government decided to make the Chief Secretary's Lodge the official residence of the President of Ireland. The decision was rescinded when a report from the Office of Public Works (OPW) advised the Taoiseach, Éamon de Valera that the building was structurally unsound and would need expensive remedial work of the sort that could not be completed in time for the planned presidential entry into office in June. The President was later installed in the vacant Viceregal Lodge nearby. The building was re-rented to the United States government. The embassy was later moved to a purpose-built building in Ballsbridge (Embassy of the United States in Dublin), leaving the lodge as the Ambassador's residence.

=== U.S. ambassador's residence ===
Extensive renovations to the house and property were made by the U.S. government in 1952. In the 1970s, the grounds were christened Deerfield by the wife of a United States ambassador on account of the number of deer who roam in the open parkland around the mansion (Phoenix Park). The property consists of 62 acres of lawn, orchards and gardens on which are located the Ambassador's residence, three cottages and a security building at the front gate. The lower ground floor of the residence comprises a ballroom, reception and dining room, library, office, kitchens pantry, staff room and laundry. Six suites, bedroom, bathroom and dressing room, plus a sitting room are located on the upper floor. Outdoor amenities include a seasonal American football field, basketball court and tennis court.

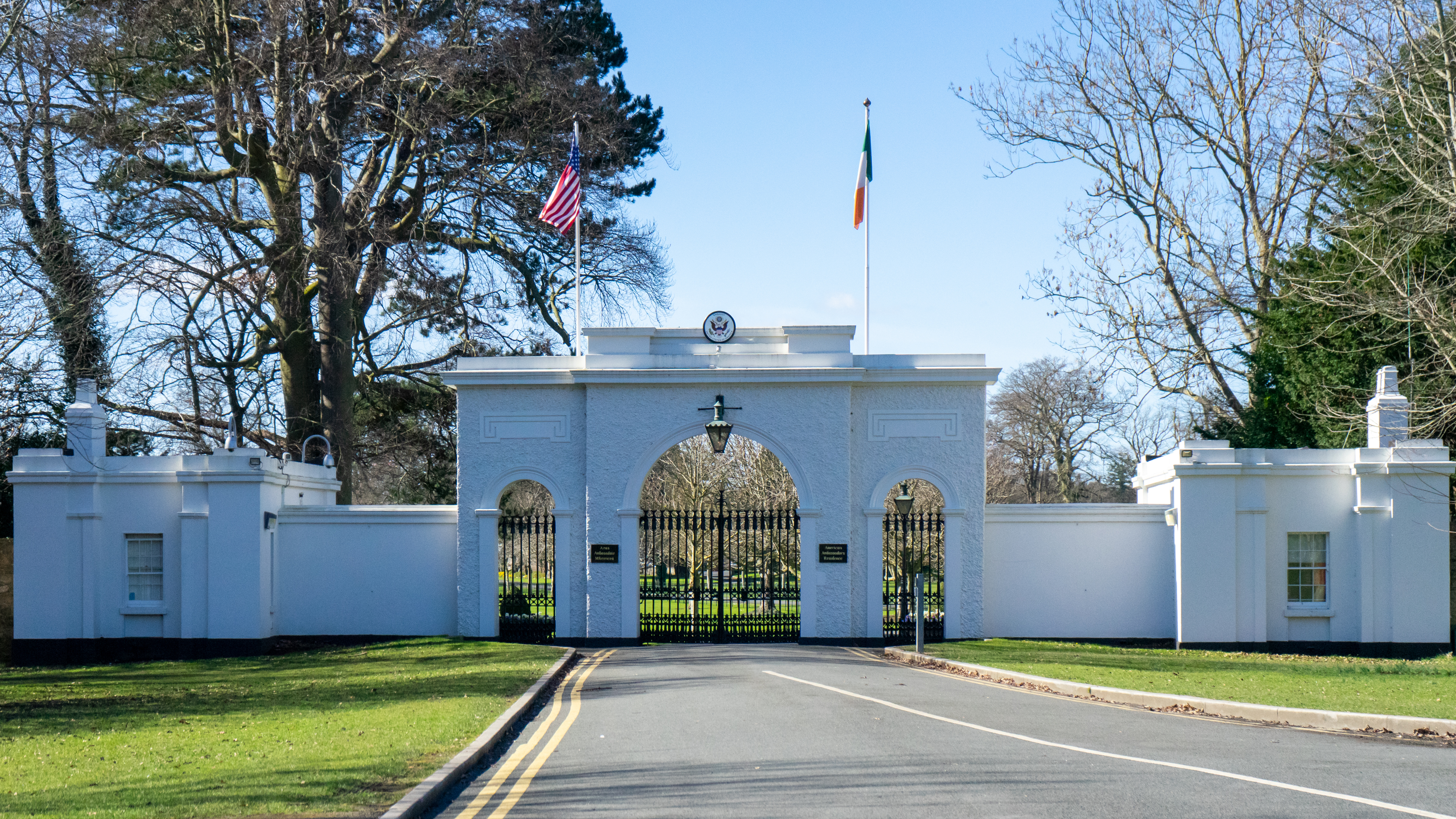
The front gate of the Ambassador's Residence, as viewed from Chesterfield Avenue.

It has been previously suggested that the building should become the residence of the taoiseach. In 2005, the idea of turning the Chief Secretary's Lodge into a taoiseach's residence was abandoned when the Office of Public Works instead applied for planning permission to turn the former ranger's residence (Steward's Lodge) in the grounds of the state guest palace, Farmleigh, into a smaller taoiseach's residence instead. The grounds are operated by the United States Department of State.

U.S. presidents John F. Kennedy, Richard Nixon, Bill Clinton, and Joe Biden have all stayed at Deerfield during Irish visits. Presidents Ronald Reagan, George W. Bush and Barack Obama stayed elsewhere for security reasons, due to the expanse of the property. Security at the grounds is provided externally by the Special Detective Unit (SDU), the main counter-terrorism and counter-intelligence branch of the Garda Síochána (Irish national police), and internally by the U.S. Diplomatic Security Service (DSS) and U.S. Marine Corps Embassy Security Group.

== Notable residents ==
=== United Kingdom ===
- John Blaquiere, 1st Baron de Blaquiere
- Arthur Wellesley, 1st Duke of Wellington
- Sir Robert Peel
- Robert Stewart, Viscount Castlereagh
- James Bryce, 1st Viscount Bryce
- John Churchill, 1st Duke of Marlborough
- Lord Randolph Churchill
- Sir Winston Churchill

=== United States ===
Starting with W. W. McDowell, the second envoy of the United States, the residence has been used by each subsequent envoy (until 1950) or ambassador (since 1950).

== See also ==
- Ireland–United States relations
- Embassy of Ireland in Washington, D.C.
- Winfield House (London)
