= W. W. McDowell =

American politician (1867 – 1934)

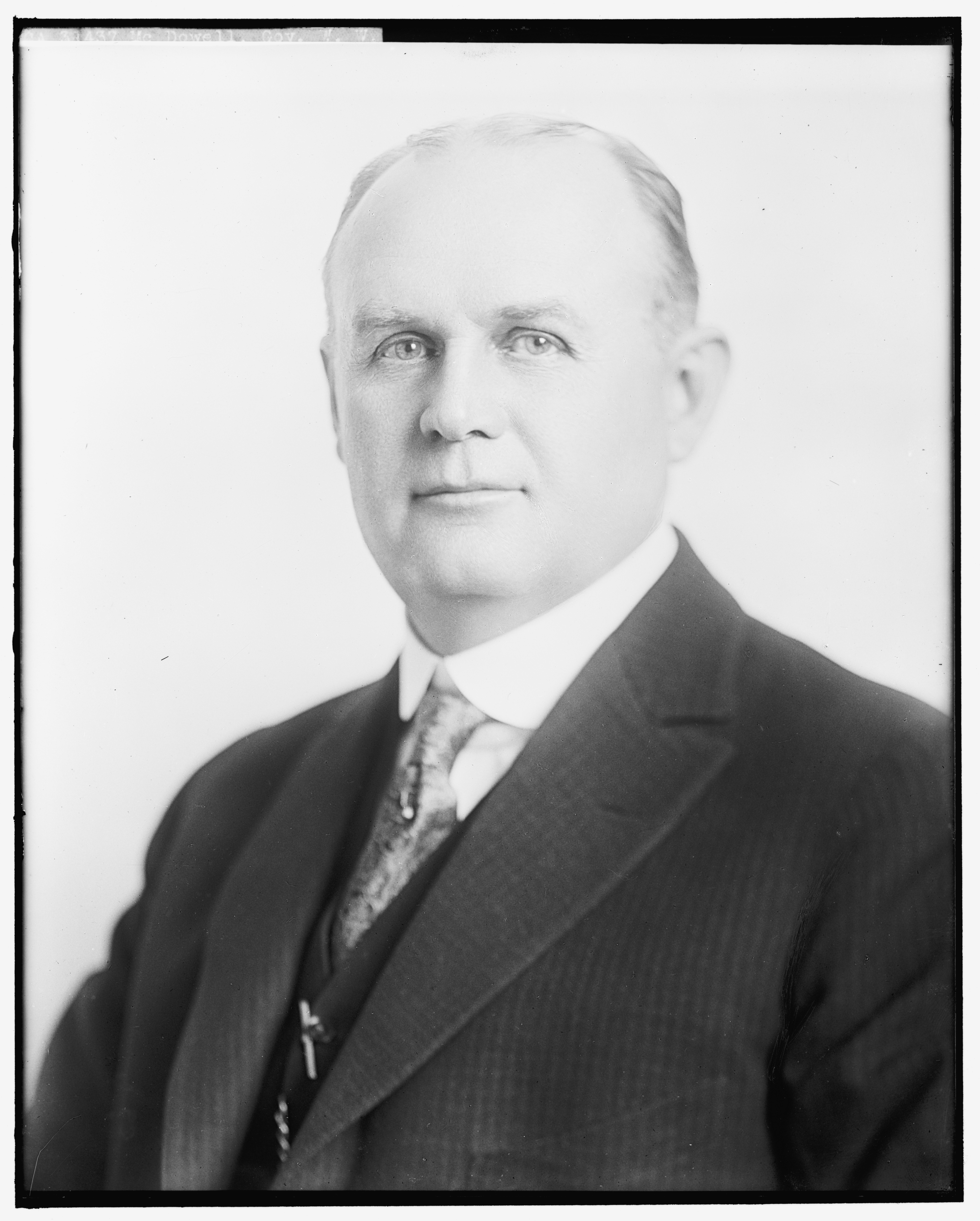

United States Envoy to the Irish Free State
- In office March 27, 1934 – April 9, 1934
- President: Franklin D. Roosevelt
- Preceded by: Frederick A. Sterling
- Succeeded by: Alvin M. Owsley

7th Lieutenant Governor of Montana
- In office January 6, 1913 – January 2, 1921
- Governor: Sam V. Stewart
- Preceded by: William R. Allen
- Succeeded by: Nelson Story, Jr.

11th Speaker of the Montana House of Representatives
- In office January 3, 1909 – March 11, 1912
- Preceded by: E. W. King
- Succeeded by: Alexander MacDonald

Personal details
- Born: January 22, 1867 Trenton, Tennessee, U.S.
- Died: April 9, 1934 (aged 67) Dublin, Ireland
- Party: Democratic
- Spouse: Mary Lee Sturges

William Wallace McDowell (January 22, 1867 – April 9, 1934), known as W. W. McDowell, was an American politician in the state of Montana who also served as United States minister to the Irish Free State.

== Montana ==
McDowell was born in Trenton, Tennessee, and came to Montana in 1896. He served in the Montana House of Representatives from 1908 to 1913, and was Speaker from 1909 to 1913. He served as Lieutenant Governor of Montana from 1913 to 1921.

== Ireland ==
In September 1933, McDowell was appointed to serve as minister to the Irish Free State by president Franklin D. Roosevelt; he was reappointed in January 1934, as his initial appointment had occurred during a recess of the Senate. Upon presenting his credentials to Irish leaders on March 27, 1934, his official title was Envoy Extraordinary and Minister Plenipotentiary. Two weeks later, he died of a sudden heart attack on April 9, 1934, while attending a banquet in Dublin.

== Personal life ==
McDowell's wife died in Chicago in November 1933, prior to McDowell moving to Ireland; the couple had married in 1912. After McDowell's death in Dublin several months later, his body was returned to the United States and he was buried in Memphis, Tennessee.

Diplomatic posts
| Preceded by Frederick A. Sterling | United States Envoy to the Irish Free State; 1934 | Succeeded by Alvin M. Owsley |
