= Edward Walsh (diplomat) =

American businessman and diplomat

Edward S. Walsh
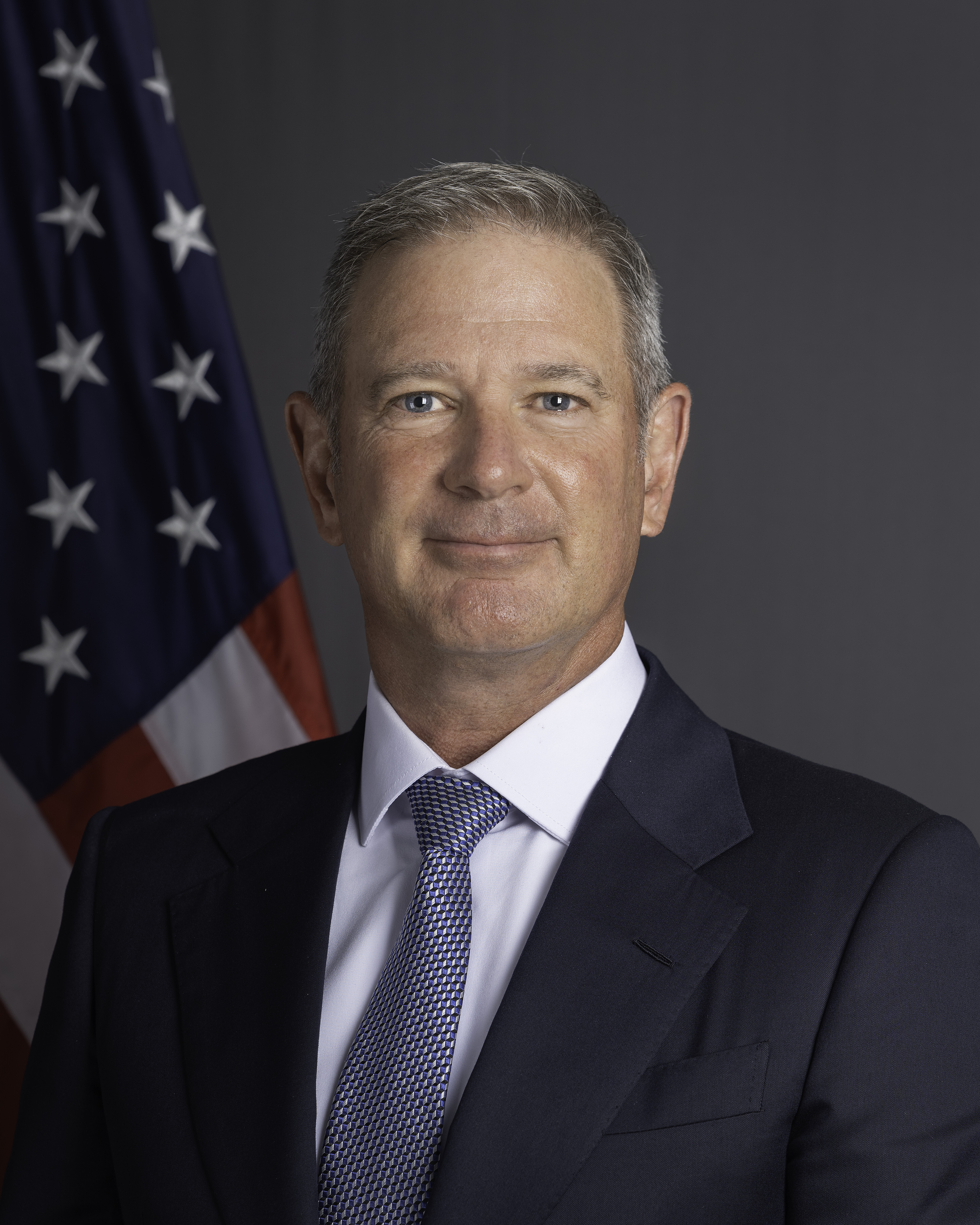
- Official portrait, 2025

26th United States Ambassador to Ireland
- Incumbent
- Assumed office July 1, 2025
- President: Donald Trump
- Preceded by: Claire D. Cronin

Personal details
- Party: Republican
- Children: 3
- Education: Villanova University (BS)

Edward Sharp Walsh is an American diplomat, businessman, and philanthropist, serving as the 26th United States ambassador to Ireland since July 2025.

== Career ==
Walsh is the president of the Walsh Company, a general contracting and project management firm he founded in 2003. Before establishing his own firm, Walsh worked as a senior vice president at Gale & Wentworth, a diversified real estate investment and services company.

=== Public service and philanthropy ===
From 2010 to 2018, Walsh was chairman of the New Jersey Schools Development Authority under Governor Chris Christie, where he was responsible for managing school construction and renovation projects.

In addition to his public service, Walsh has been an active supporter of the Republican Party. He was a delegate to the 2020 Republican National Convention and backed Donald Trump's re-election campaign.

Walsh has contributed to various nonprofit organizations in Morris and Somerset counties, New Jersey. He has been recognized for his work with the American Cancer Society, Somerset Hills Learning Institute, Interfaith Food Pantry of Morristown, Employment Horizons, Jewish Vocational Services, and Family Service of Morris County.

== United States ambassador to Ireland (2025–present) ==
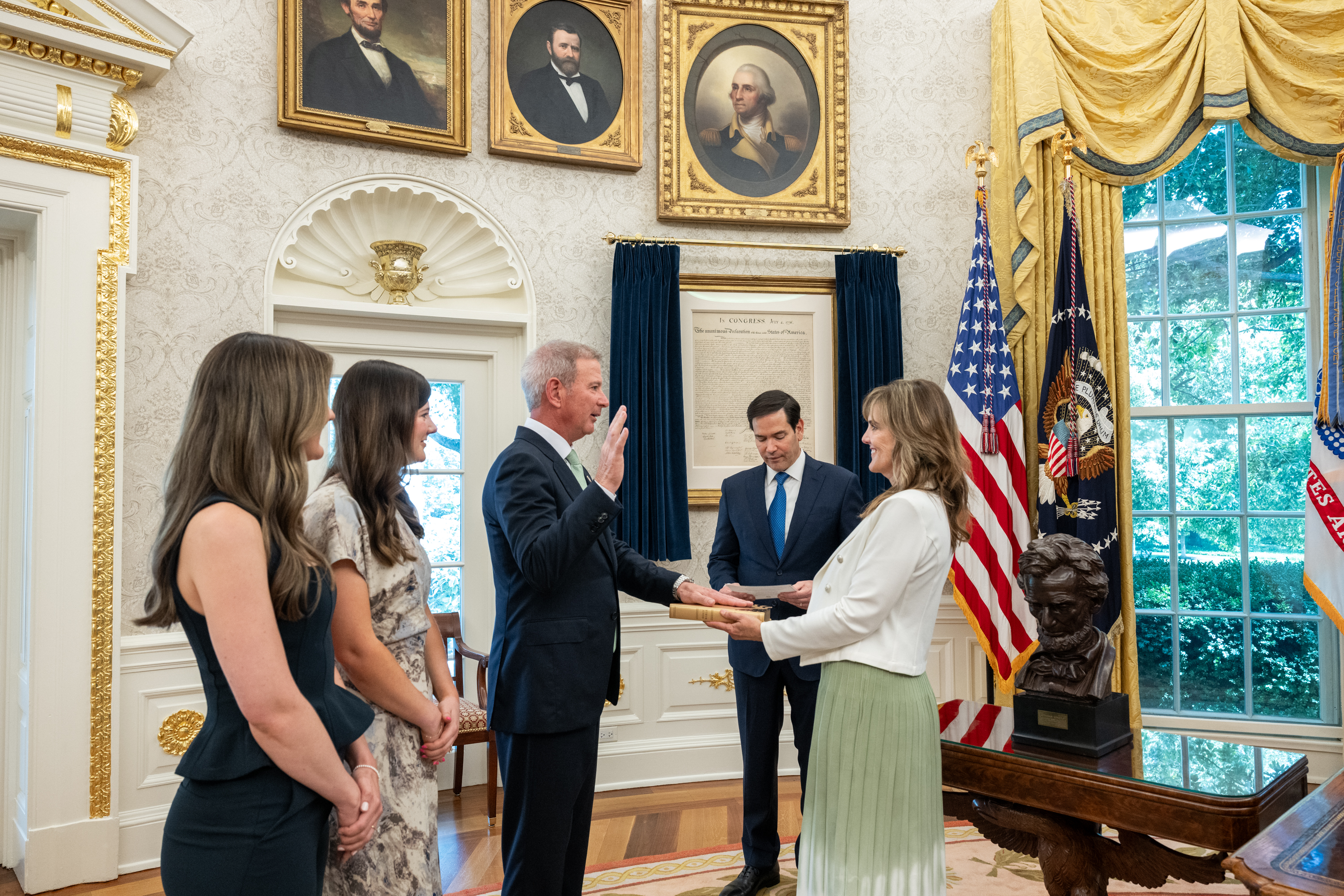
Walsh being sworn in as the United States Ambassador to Ireland, June 2025

On December 14, 2024, President-elect Donald Trump announced Walsh’s nomination as the United States Ambassador to Ireland. The announcement was made via Trump’s Truth Social platform. Trump described Walsh as a “Champion Golfer” and a valuable “asset” for the ambassadorship.

Walsh was confirmed by the United States Senate on 4 June 2025, by a vote of 57 to 38, receiving the support of seven Democrats. He was sworn in to office by Secretary of State Marco Rubio in a ceremony in the Oval Office on June 19, 2025. He presented his credentials to Irish President Michael D. Higgins on July 1, 2025.

== Personal life ==
Prior to his appointment as ambassador, Walsh lived in Bedminster, New Jersey. He is of Irish descent.

Diplomatic posts
Preceded by Claire D. Cronin	United States Ambassador to Ireland; 2025–present	Incumbent
