= Embassy of the United States, Dublin =

Diplomatic mission of the United States of America to Ireland

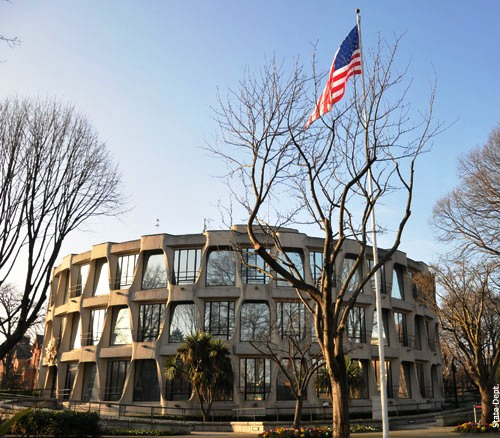
- Address: 42 Elgin Road, Ballsbridge, Dublin 4, D04 TP03, Ireland
- Coordinates: 53.3303°N 6.2337°W
- Opened: May 23, 1964
- Jurisdiction: Ireland
- Website: U.S. Embassy in Ireland

The Embassy of the United States of America in Dublin is the diplomatic mission of the United States of America to Ireland.

The chancery is located at 42 Elgin Road, Ballsbridge, Dublin 4. The Ambassador's Official Residence is located at the Deerfield Residence, Phoenix Park, Dublin 8.

== History ==
=== Chancery ===
The embassy was designed by American architect John M. Johansen, in consultation with Irish architect Michael Scott. It was constructed between 1962 and 1964 on a triangular site at the intersection between Elgin Road and Pembroke Road. A Victorian house was previously on the site, and had been used by Bord Fáilte as their headquarters. It was constructed by G&T Crampton. The building was officially opened on May 23, 1964 by Congressman Wayne L. Hays.

The new building is circular in plan, incorporating modern interpretations of early Celtic and later Irish buildings with contemporary, bold American design as well as symbolising the first American flag, and is considered a Dublin landmark. There are five floors at the complex, two underground and three above ground, plus a smaller sixth storey on the rooftop. The ambassador, Grant Stockdale, proclaimed the building "the showpiece of Europe". Among Dubliners, it acquired the name "Wall of Death" owing to its circular shape. Despite the modern design, it is deemed to sit well in its Victorian context as it of similar height to the surrounding buildings.

On 23 May 2011, a 2005 model Cadillac Presidential State Car was involved in an incident when it got stuck on a ramp as it exited the U.S. Embassy during an official visit by President Barack Obama. It is understood that the wheelbase of the vehicle was too great for the ramp, and it had to be towed off the ramp as a large crowd looked on. President Obama left the embassy through an alternative exit. The U.S. Secret Service later stated that the car was a spare, and that President Obama and First Lady Michelle Obama were in another vehicle.

=== Ambassador's Residence ===
Deerfield Residence, a large 18th-century house on over 60 acres (24 ha) in the Phoenix Park, has since 1927 been the United States Ambassador's Official Residence in Ireland. Before the 1960s, the embassy was located at the grounds, then known as the Chief Secretary's Lodge. The United States first opened a consulate in Ireland in 1859 at a building on Adelaide Road, Dublin 2, and also had a presence at Merrion Square, Dublin 2 from 1948. Both current diplomatic premises are owned and operated by the United States Department of State on behalf of the United States federal government.

=== Future ===
In late 2012, the United States Department of State announced the embassy will move to new location within a number of years. The chancery in Ballsbridge, which was 50 years old in 2014, has been deemed "no longer suitable", and an embassy spokesperson stated that the current building no longer meets the needs in terms of size of the expanding American diplomatic presence in Ireland (between 150 and 200 staff work at the embassy), and does not conform to new construction and security requirements ("code") issued by Washington D.C. A number of sites around Dublin City are being considered for the construction of a new embassy building, which will be on larger grounds, will be a larger building than the Ballsbridge Chancery, and may be located nearer to the Ambassador's Residence and Dublin Airport for security reasons and ease of access. However, completion of the move to a new embassy facility is likely to take up to 10 years and cost tens of millions of dollars.

== Security ==
Security at the embassy is seen as a priority for Ireland's national police, the Garda Síochána. As such, the embassy is protected around-the-clock by a team of armed, plainclothes detectives from the Special Detective Unit (SDU), the force's counter-terrorism and counter-intelligence section. They provide close protection to the ambassador and high-ranking diplomats when travelling outside of the embassy, as well as motorcade security. The U.S. Ambassador's Residence (Deerfield Residence, Phoenix Park) is also guarded. Within the embassy and residence grounds, security is the responsibility of the Bureau of Diplomatic Security (United States Department of State) and Marine Corps Embassy Security Group, who are heavily armed. Following the September 11 attacks in 2001, new secure entrances, guardhouses and blast walls were installed. The external windows of the chancery building are reflective, as a privacy measure. In late 2013, significant upgrades were made to the physical and perimeter security of the embassy, designed to reduce the threat of vehicle bombings and to repel intruders. This was part of U.S. government security directives at diplomatic missions across 14 different European nations in response to the 2012 Benghazi attacks.

== Offices ==
- Citizen Services
- Consular Section (Visa)
- Commercial Service
- Press/Public Affairs Section
- Information Resource Center
- Agriculture Section
- Political and Economic Section
- Management Section
- Defense Attaché Office
- Marine Corps Embassy Security Group
- U.S. Diplomatic Security Service
  - Regional Security Office
- U.S. Department of Homeland Security
  - U.S. Customs and Border Protection (Dublin Airport, Shannon Airport)

== See also ==
- List of ambassadors of the United States to Ireland
- Embassy of Ireland, Washington, D.C.
- Foreign relations of Ireland
- Ireland–United States relations
