= Bringin' Home the Oil =

Bringin' Home the Oil is an Irish maritime folk song written in 1969 by Tommy Makem and the Clancy Brothers as the theme for a two-minute-long television commercial for Gulf Oil, as part of their sponsorship of NBC News coverage of the US space program and the national political conventions in celebration of Gulf Oil's then-new operations in Bantry Bay.

The upbeat 6/8 melody is that of a traditional Scottish song, "The Gallant Forty Twa" which was also recorded by the Clancys. It tells the story of Gulf's 300,000 dwt Universe Ireland, as well as mention of three other ships in the fleet: Universe Kuwait, Universe Japan, and Universe Portugal. The song alludes to the construction of still more vessels; these would later be the vessels rounding out the six-vessel Universe-class fleet, namely the Universe Iran and Universe Korea. Instrumentation in the song is simple, consisting of strummed banjo and guitar, as well as a solo tin whistle between verses.

The song is told from the point of view of an "able-bodied sailor" who boasts of "sailin' all around the world" and "bringin' home the oil" to "keep all Europe movin' from our base in Bantry Bay." Gulf's operations from its Whiddy Island oil terminal in Bantry Bay ended on a night in January 1979 when the Total Oil tanker Betelgeuse exploded while unloading its cargo of Saudi crude oil.

The commercial itself was simple, consisting of helicopter shots of the various vessels (beginning with the superstructure of the Universe Kuwait) often in conjunction with tugboats to give the viewer a sense of scale regarding the size of the ships. One overhead shot shows five tugboats pushing on the port side of the Universe Ireland as part of a docking maneuver.

The commercial, lasting more than two minutes, appeared during space flights, elections and political conventions on NBC television.

== See also ==
- Whiddy Island Disaster
- Marketing and promotion of Gulf Oil
