= Curtiss S =

Curtiss engine

Model "S"
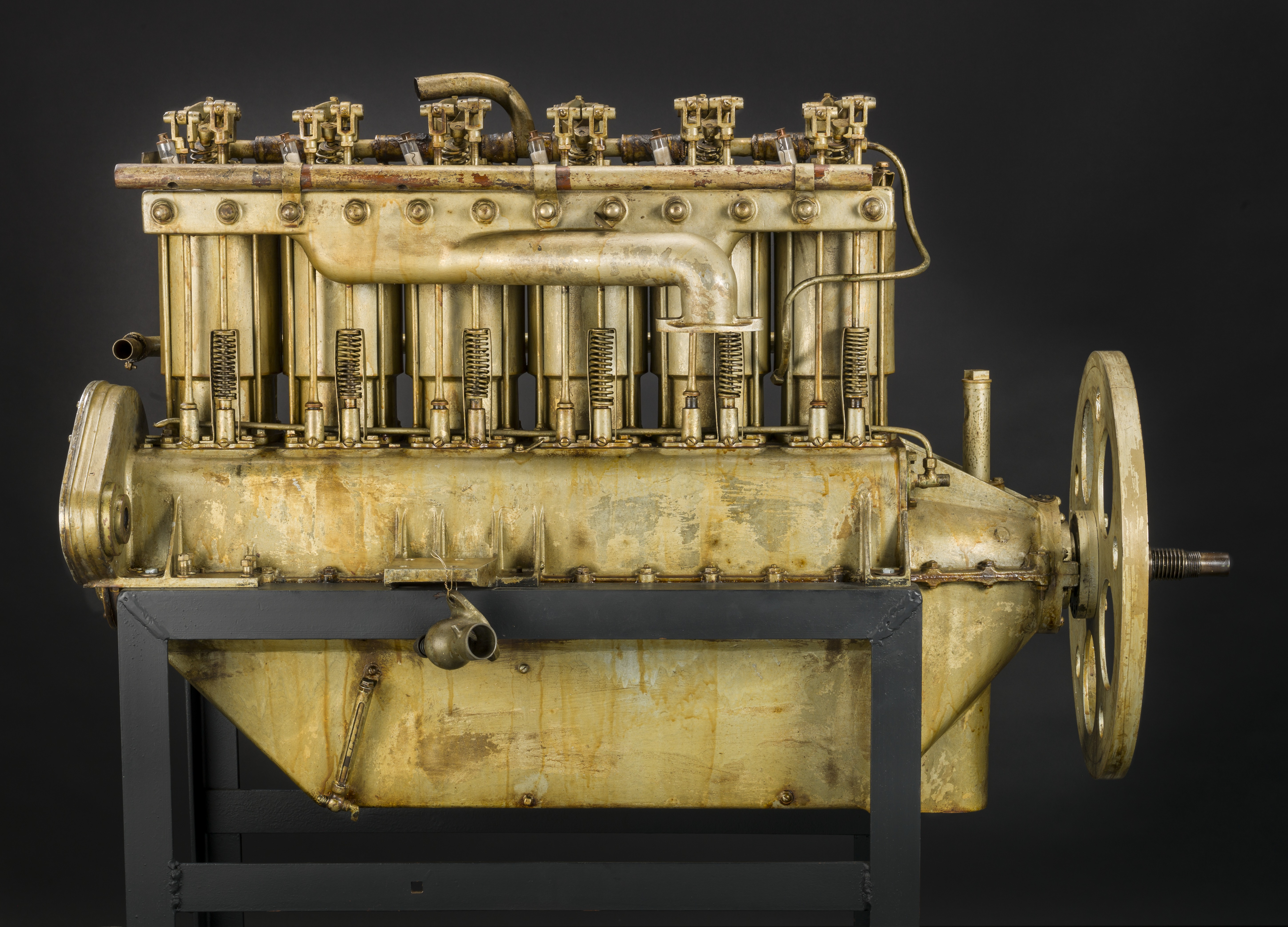
- Curtiss Model "S" aircraft engine
- Type: Inline-six piston engine
- National origin: United States
- Manufacturer: Curtiss Aeroplane and Motor Company
- First run: 1912
- Number built: 6

The Curtiss S was a water-cooled 6-cylinder in-line aero-engine built by the Curtiss Aeroplane and Motor Company in 1912.

The Model S was designed by Charles B. Kirkham, who went on to become Curtiss's chief engineer. The engine retained the same cylinder bore and stroke as the company’s four-cylinder Model K but featured separate pushrods for the suction and exhaust valves. Production of the type was limited to six engines, five of which were acquired by the United States Navy.

== Specifications ==
Data from Angle

=== General characteristics ===
- Type: Upright six-cylinder four-stroke inline piston engine
- Bore: 4 in (102 mm)
- Stroke: 5 in (127 mm)
- Length: 31.125 in (791 mm)
- Width: 12 in (305 mm)
- Height: 30.5 in (775 mm)
- Dry weight: 245 lb (111 kg)

=== Components ===
- Valvetrain: One intake and one exhaust valve per cylinder, actuated by separate pushrods
- Cooling system: Water-cooled

=== Performance ===
- Power output: 60 hp (45 kW) at 1,100 rpm and 70 hp (52 kW) at 1,325 rpm

== See also ==
- List of aircraft engines
