= Wexford Harbour =

Harbour in County Wexford, Ireland

Coordinates: 52°20′N 6°24′W

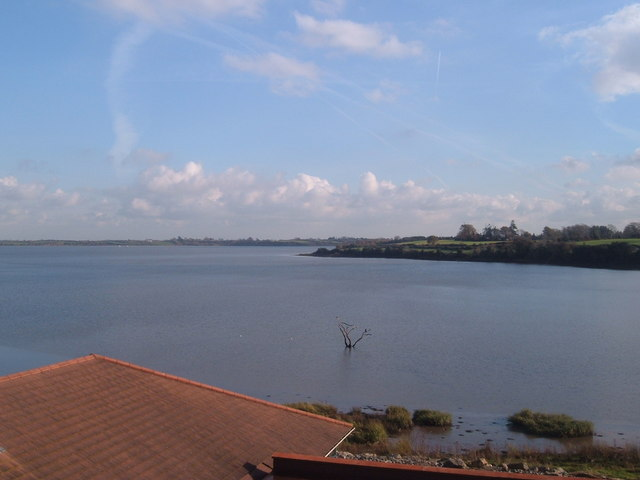
View across Wexford Harbour

Wexford Harbour (Irish: Loch Garman) in County Wexford, Ireland is the natural harbour at the mouth of the River Slaney. In earlier times, the area occupied by the harbour was considerably larger than it is today, up to ten miles (16 km) wide at its widest point, with large mud flats on both sides. These were known as the North Slob and the South Slob from the Irish word slab, meaning mud. It contained several islands, among which the large island of Beggerin was known to be a safe refuge for early Christian settlements.

== History ==
=== Early history ===
Vikings arrived from Norway in 819 AD and founded the city of Wexford calling it Waes Fjord, meaning 'inlet of the mudflats', and the modern name has evolved from this. Over the course of about 300 years, the Norse settled in Wexford, intermarried with the local population and gradually converted to Christianity. They forged temporary alliances with Irish kings, sometimes fighting with other Norse towns; at other times, such as in 933 and 1161 they were attacked by the Irish. The Norse remained in control until 1169 AD when Wexford was attacked by a superior force of Norman and Irish soldiers. There was a short battle after which the Hiberno-Norse withdrew within the walls leaving their ships unprotected. These were set on fire by the attackers - this may have been the origin of the Wexford Town crest, the three burning ships.

=== The 17th century ===
Wexford became a major maritime port exporting fish, cloth, wool and hides. It was Ireland's leading fishing port in the 15th and 16th century exporting mainly to ports along the west coast of England and Wales. In 1642, the Dublin government in a dispatch from London described Wexford as "a place plentiful in ships and seamen, and where the rebels have set up Spanish colours on their walls in defiance of the kings and kingdom of England, and have gotten in from foreign parts great stores of arms and ammunition". This was only one year after the Irish Rebellion of 1641 when Flemish mariners were encouraged to use Wexford Harbour to attack British ships passing along the Irish Sea from ports Whitehaven to Bristol and even in the English Channel. Wexford Harbour was a marvellous base for operations; it was strategically located at the junction of the Irish Sea, the Western Approaches of the English Channel and the Atlantic Ocean. The difficult navigation of the harbour gave security to the locals, as larger attacking ships could not enter. The sandbanks and narrow channels did not present much difficulty to the Dunkirk frigates or the local shallow draft cargo ships.

=== Cromwell ===
By the mid-1640s, the privateering community of Irish, Flemish and French based in Wexford had a fleet of 200 cargo ships and 21 frigates whose purpose was to attack English ships between Biscay and the Baltic. Within a few years this fleet had doubled. However, it could not last. In 1649, a parliamentary army under Oliver Cromwell landed in Dublin and after some months set out to conquer Wexford. An army of 7,000-foot soldiers and 2,000 cavalry camped north of the town and sent a detachment to capture Rosslare fort at the mouth of the harbour. This enabled Cromwell's fleet to enter the harbour unopposed. The army moved to south of the town and bombarded Wexford Castle. Initially, Cromwell issued a summons to surrender, offering lenient terms in the hope that he could secure Wexford intact and use it as winter quarters for his troops. The mayor, aldermen and many citizens of Wexford were prepared to surrender but the military commander played for time. Cromwell lost patience and talks broke down. The bombardment continued and after a week or so Cromwell's troops breached the defences when the commander of the castle surrendered. The castle guns were turned on the town and Cromwell's troops launched an immediate attack on the town's defenders.

Irish troops made a stand in the market square, but they were quickly overwhelmed. Cromwell and his officers made no attempt to restrain their soldiers, who slaughtered the Wexford defenders and plundered the town. Hundreds of civilians were shot or drowned as they tried to escape the carnage by fleeing across the River Slaney. The Irish privateering fleet was finally broken up. Afterwards, Cromwell expressed no remorse for the massacre of civilians at Wexford in his subsequent report to Parliament. He regarded it as a further judgement upon the perpetrators of the Catholic uprising of 1641 and also upon the pirates who had operated out of Wexford harbour. His principal regret was that the town was so badly damaged during the sack that it was no longer suitable as winter quarters.

=== Act of Union ===
In 1764 the historian Amyas Griffith wrote that Wexford's chief export was corn (2 million barrels per year), herrings, beer, beef, hides, tallow, butter etc. and they trade to all parts of the globe but in particular to Liverpool, Barbados, Dublin, Norway and Bordeaux. The town continued to experience expansion and economic growth and in 1772 two important bodies were set up - the Quay Corporation with full responsibility for shipping, quays and harbour and the Bridge Corporation to build two bridges across the Slaney at Wexford and Ferrycarrig. By 1788, Wexford, with 44 cargo ships and 200 herring boats was the sixth busiest port in Ireland. However, the dangerous state of the harbour was a major impediment to trade. A new body - The Corporation for the Improvement of the Bar, Town & Harbour of Wexford was set up to improve and enhance the channel and to build quays, wharves and docks.

The Irish Rebellion of 1798 resulted in the hurried passing of the Act of Union in 1800. This created the United Kingdom of Great Britain and Ireland, and Ireland was ruled solely through the British Parliament at Westminster. From then until Ireland achieved independence, all major decisions regarding Wexford Harbour were taken by Westminster. Unfortunately, this did not work to the advantage of the harbour and the improvement of its navigation. The pity was that those interested in improving the harbour, linked their proposed improvements with land reclamation; a linkage that would ultimately help to destroy access to Wexford by all but shallow draft vessels.

In 1832, the Ballast Bank was constructed to facilitate the loading and unloading of ballast from ships visiting the harbour. It is now a protected structure.

A lifeboat was stationed on Rosslare Point from 1838. It was originally crewed by the Coastguard at the fort but a permanent crew was later provided by the Royal National Lifeboat Institution. After severe storms between 27 December 1924 and 13 January 1925 damaged Rosslare Point, the lifeboat was moved to Wexford until Rosslare Harbour Lifeboat Station was reopened in 1927. An inshore lifeboat station was established in Wexford in 2002.

=== Destruction of the harbour by drainage works ===
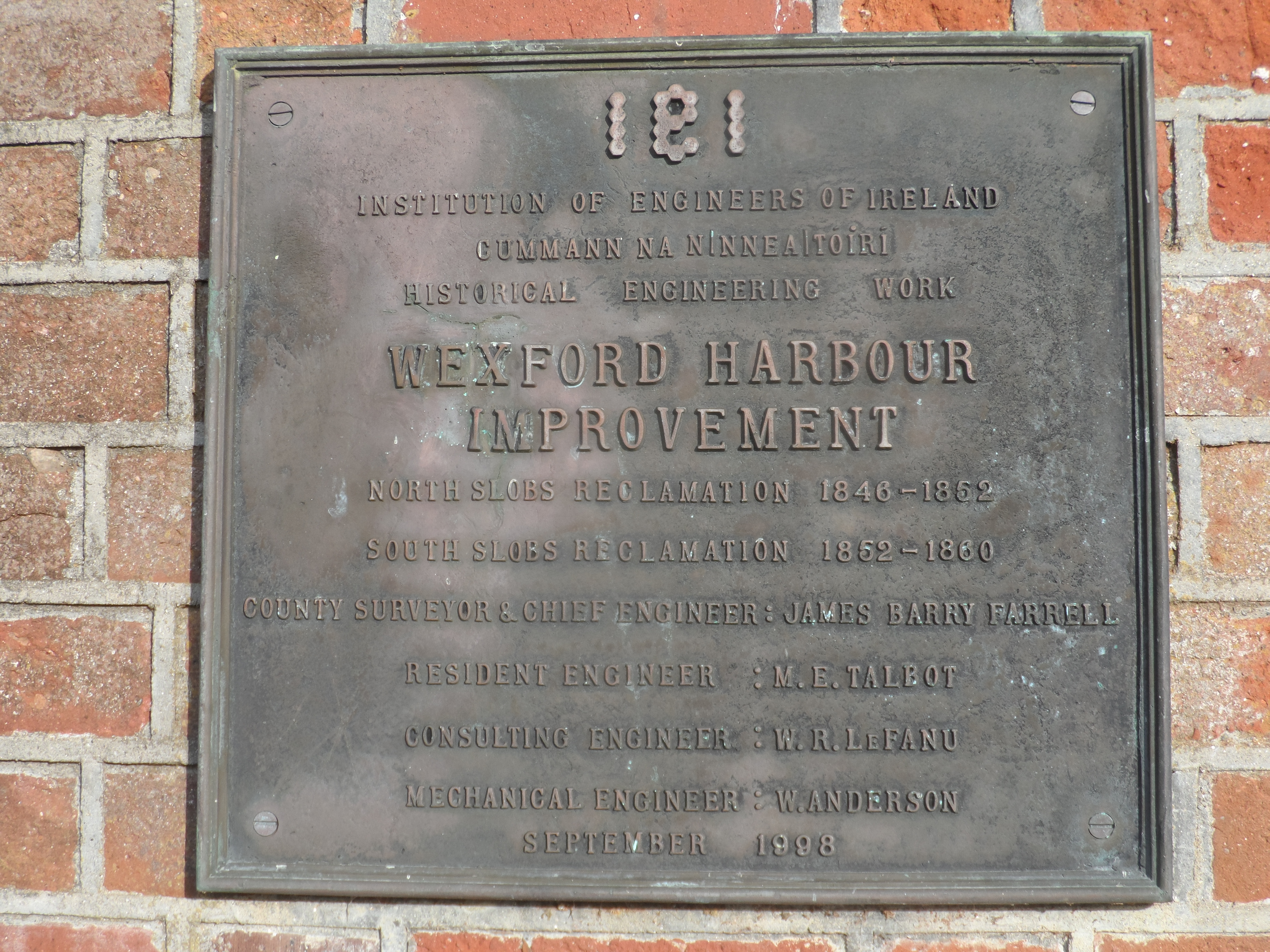
Plaque erected by the Institution of Engineers of Ireland commemorating the improvements carried out to the harbour in 1846–60.

In the 19th century, dykes were built and pumping systems installed to drain the slobs, producing fine agricultural land below sea level in polders similar to those in the Netherlands. The size of the harbour was reduced considerably. What was left was mostly shallow and up to today suffers from serious silt problems. The tides and currents of the river frequently shift mud and sand in the harbour. Islands of sand can appear and then disappear over the course of a few weeks, particularly at the mouth of the harbour. As a result, the harbour is not suitable for large ships and is used mainly by mussel dredgers and pleasure craft.

=== World War I ===
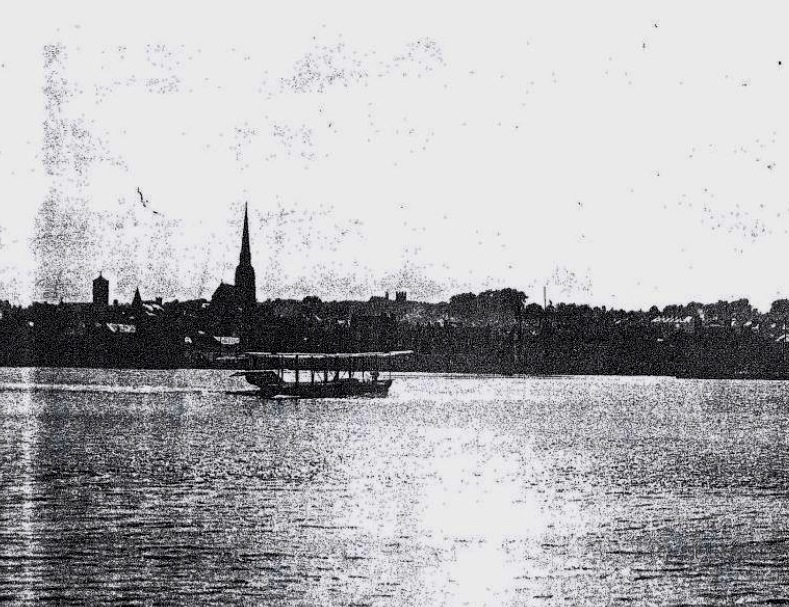
Curtiss seaplane at Wexford (1918)

During World War I the US Navy operated a naval air station, known as U.S. Naval Air Station Wexford, at Ferrybank on the eastern side of the harbour.

== Sailing directions ==
Entry for sailors unfamiliar with the harbour is not straightforward. It is best within two hours either side of high water and safest for boats drawing less than 1.5 metres (4.9 ft). In strong winds between SE and NE direction, the sea breaks on the bar. Entry is then hazardous and should not be attempted.

== Sources ==
- High skies, low lands : an anthology of the Wexford slobs and harbour. Rowe, David, 1920-, Wilson, Christopher J., 1946-. Enniscorthy, Co. Wexford [Ireland]: Duffry Press. 1996. ISBN 1901273008. OCLC 38043134.
- Colfer, Billy. (2008). Wexford : a town and its landscape. Togher, Cork, Ireland: Cork University Press. ISBN 9781859184295. OCLC 223971409.
- Nicholas Furlong, Land Reclamation in Wexford Harbour, 1969, Wex.Hist.Soc, 53-77
- Power, John, 1933 August 29- (2011). A maritime history of County Wexford. Kilmore Quay: Olinda Publications. ISBN 9780957046207. OCLC 773425530.
- Ireland, John de Courcy, 1911-2006. (1992). Ireland's maritime heritage. Dublin, Ireland: An Post. ISBN 1872228097. OCLC 28131286.
