= Julius Curtis Townsend =

American Navy Medal of Honor recipient and rear admiral

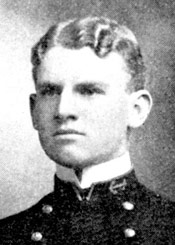
- Townsend as a U.S. Naval Academy midshipman
- Born: February 22, 1881; Athens, Missouri, US
- Died: December 28, 1939 (aged 58); Brooklyn, New York, U.S.
- Burial place: Arlington National Cemetery
- Military career
- Allegiance: United States
- Branch: United States Navy
- Service years: 1902–1939
- Rank: Rear Admiral
- Unit: USS Vermont
- Commands: 4th Naval District; Cruisers, Battle Force; Cruiser Division No. 2 Ships Movement Division; USS Texas; USS Galveston; USS Trinity; NAS Queenstown, Ireland; NAS Whiddy Island, Ireland
- Conflicts: World War I
- Awards: Medal of Honor; Navy Cross

Julius Curtis Townsend (February 22, 1881 – December 28, 1939) was born in Missouri. He graduated from the United States Naval Academy in 1902.

He received the Medal of Honor for actions at the United States occupation of Veracruz, 1914. He was later awarded the Navy Cross and also served in World War I. He remained in the United States Navy for the rest of his life, ultimately serving as a rear admiral from May 1936 until his death in December 1939.

== Biography ==
Born in Athens, Missouri, Townsend was raised in nearby Keokuk, Iowa. He entered the U.S. Naval Academy from Iowa on September 8, 1898 and was graduated on May 2, 1902.

By the time of his Medal of Honor action in 1914, Townsend was a lieutenant serving aboard the battleship Vermont. He was promoted to lieutenant commander effective November 26, 1915 and reassigned to the battleship Oklahoma.

During World War I, Townsend commanded Naval Air Station Whiddy Island, Ireland and Naval Air Station Queenstown, Ireland. He received a temporary promotion to commander on July 1, 1918 which was made permanent on July 1, 1919.

From 1919 to 1921, Townsend served as executive officer at the Naval Torpedo Station in Newport, Rhode Island. He then served as executive officer of the battleship Nevada. From 1922 to 1923, Townsend was commanding officer of the replenishment oiler Trinity. He then attended the Naval War College.

From 1924 to 1926, Townsend was assigned to the office of naval operations in Washington, D.C. He was promoted to captain effective July 18, 1925. From February 1926 to April 1928, Townsend commanded the protected cruiser Galveston. He then served as captain of the yard at the Philadelphia Navy Yard before commanding the battleship Texas from May 1931 to June 1933. Townsend then returned to the office of naval operations as director of the Ships Movement Division.

Promoted to rear admiral on May 1, 1936, Townsend became commander of Cruiser Division No. 2, Battle Force, United States Fleet. In June 1937, he took command of Cruisers, Battle Force. In August 1938, Townsend returned to Washington, D.C. as a member the General Board. In November 1938, he was given command of the 4th Naval District and the Philadelphia Navy Yard.

Rear Admiral Townsend died at the Brooklyn Naval Hospital on December 28, 1939. He was interred at Arlington National Cemetery on January 2, 1940.

== Medal of Honor citation ==
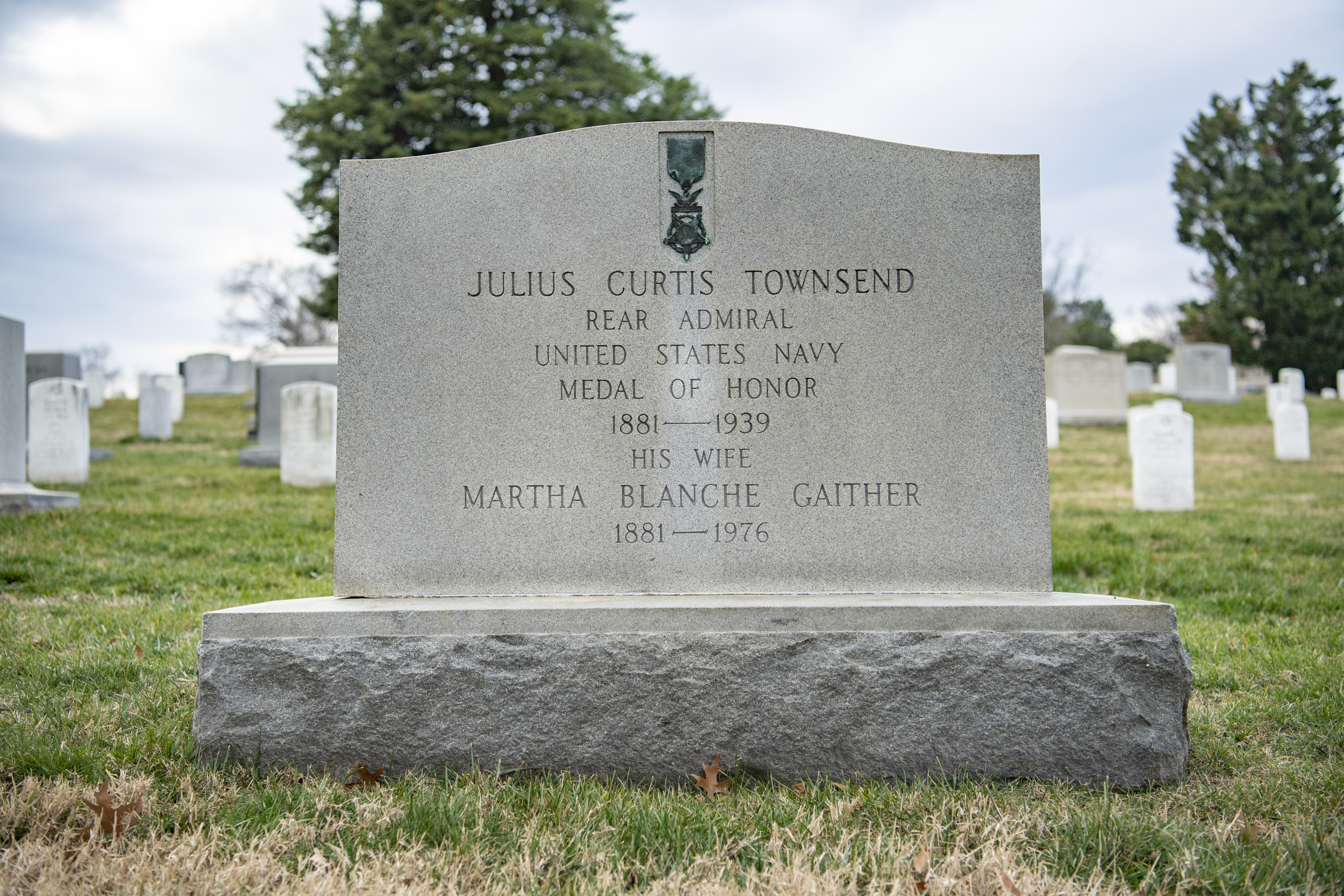
Grave at Arlington National Cemetery

Rank: Lieutenant, Organization: U.S. Navy, Born: 22 February 1881, Athens, Mo., Accredited to: Missouri, Date of issue: 12/04/1915

Citation:

For distinguished conduct in battle, engagement of Vera Cruz, 22 April 1914. Lt. Townsend was eminent and conspicuous in command of his battalion. He exhibited courage and skill in leading his men through the action of the 22d and in the final occupation of the city.

== Navy Cross citation ==
Rank: Captain, Organization: U.S. Navy, Month of issue: 11/1927

Citation:

For distinguished service to the Government in a duty of great responsibility as commanding officer of the U.S.S. Galveston in Nicaraguan waters in the fall of 1926 and the spring of 1927, Nicaragua then being in a state of insurrection. Largely through his good judgment, tact, patience and ability, good order was maintained and disarmament accomplished in districts ashore assigned to his command without friction and without bloodshed. Captain Townsend’s actions at all times were in keeping with the highest traditions of the United States Naval Service.

== See also ==
- List of Medal of Honor recipients
- List of Medal of Honor recipients (Veracruz)
- List of United States Naval Academy alumni (Medal of Honor)
