= Admiral Townsend =

Admiral Townsend may refer to:

- George Townshend (Royal Navy officer) (1716–1769), British Royal Navy admiral
- Isaac Townsend (c. 1685–1765), British Royal Navy admiral
- John Townshend, 4th Marquess Townshend (1798–1863), British Royal Navy rear admiral
- Julius Curtis Townsend (1881–1939), U.S. Navy rear admiral
- Leslie Townsend (Royal Navy officer) (1924–1999), British Royal Navy rear admiral
