= U.S. Naval Air Station Berehaven Ireland =

NAS Berehaven
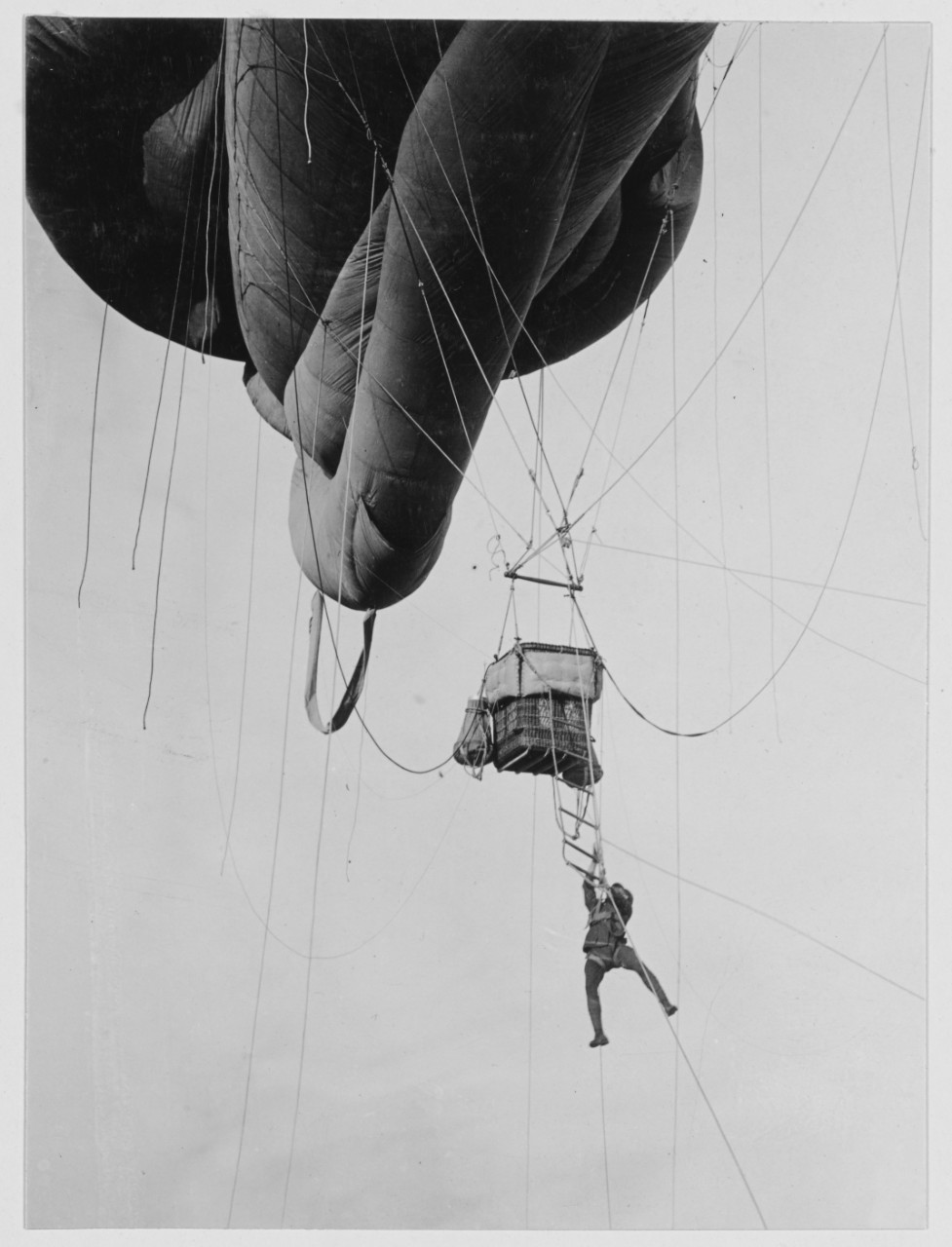
- U.S. Navy Observer disembarking from a dirigible after an anti-submarine patrol, during World War 1 at Berehaven in 1918
- IATA: none; ICAO: none

Summary
- Airport type: Military
- Operator: United States Navy
- Location: Berehaven, County Cork, Ireland
- Built: 1918
- In use: 1918–1919
- Elevation AMSL: 52 ft / 16 m
- Coordinates: 51°39′00″N 9°55′00″W

Map
- Location in Ireland

U.S. Naval Air Station Berehaven was a Lighter-than-Air (LTA) kite balloon station at Berehaven, County Cork, Ireland that the United States Navy (USN) operated in the First World War. It was commissioned on 29 April 1918 and decommissioned on 12 February 1919.

== History ==
At the start of the USA's involvement in the First World War five sites in Ireland were identified to be operated by the United States Navy in support of allied operations. They were Berehaven, Lough Foyle, Queenstown (Cobh), Wexford and Whiddy Island.

ENS Carl E. Shumway, USNRF was made the Commanding Officer of this kite-ballon station on 26 April 1918. The base was officially commissioned three days later on 29 April 1918.

NAS Berehaven was designed as a kite balloon station to provide destroyers with kite balloons for convoy and patrol duties. Practice balloon flights were made from towed trucks, since the naval air station was not close enough to Queenstown, where the destroyers were based, to permit easy transfer of kite balloons between station and ship. Berehaven was not very active because of the transfer problem and the operational requirements imposed on destroyers which did not afford time for kite balloon operations aboard.

== Equipment ==
NAS Berehaven was a kite-balloon station where balloons were kept for use in conjunction with torpedo-boat destroyers. The balloons were transferred from the shore to the destroyers, made fast, and towed at an altitude of about 500 feet (150 m). This station was on a sound formed within Bantry Bay behind Bere Island near Castletown.

== Operations ==
In July 1918 most of Berehaven's US LTA personnel and kite balloon equipment were transferred to NAS Brest, France. Berehaven later became a kite balloon station again, supporting operations aboard the Royal Navy 24-class sloop HMS Flying Fox in late July and early August 1918.

Berehaven then switched to support of balloon operations aboard the US battleships Nevada, Oklahoma and Utah from late August through mid-October. The three battleships had been sent to Europe to protect the Allied convoys approaching Ireland, and operated from Bantry Bay.

In the latter part of October 1918, preparations were being made to move LTA operations from Berehaven to Queenstown to make kite balloons more accessible to ships there.

== End of hostilities and closure ==
With the end of the war, the US Naval Air Stations Anti-submarine warfare patrols in Ireland were discontinued and all aircraft grounded and disarmed. When the Armistice of 11 November 1918 was signed NAS Berehaven had 16 kite balloons. The only United States Navy kite balloon base in the British Isles was disestablished on 12 February 1919.

== See also ==
- U.S. Naval Air Station Lough Foyle Ireland
- U.S. Naval Air Station Queenstown Ireland
- U.S. Naval Air Station Wexford Ireland
- U.S. Naval Air Station Whiddy Island Ireland
