= U.S. Naval Air Station Wexford Ireland =

NAS Wexford
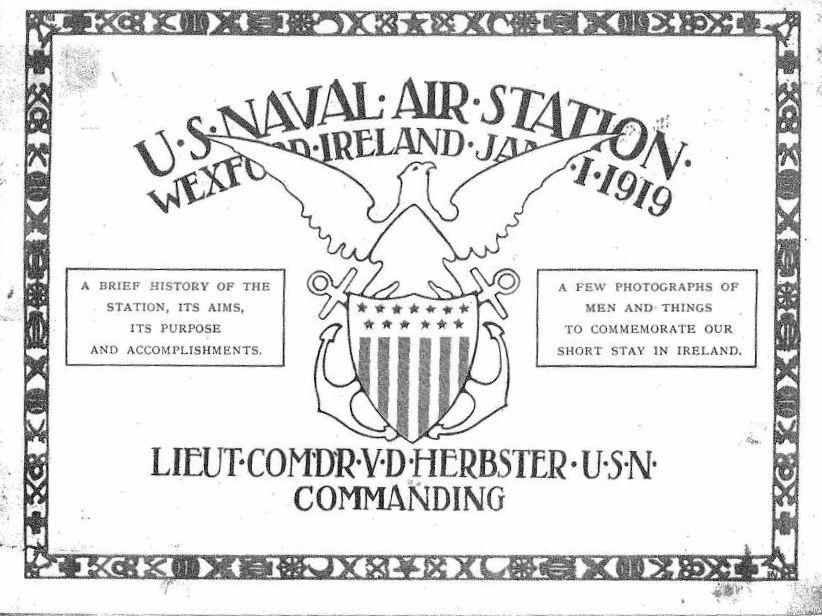
- Cover of Cruise book produced by NAS Wexford
- IATA: none; ICAO: none

Summary
- Airport type: Military
- Operator: United States Navy
- Location: Ferrybank, Wexford, County Wexford, Ireland
- Built: 1918
- In use: 1918–1919
- Elevation AMSL: 1 m (3.3 ft)
- Coordinates: 52°20′42″N 006°27′18″W

Map
- Location in Ireland

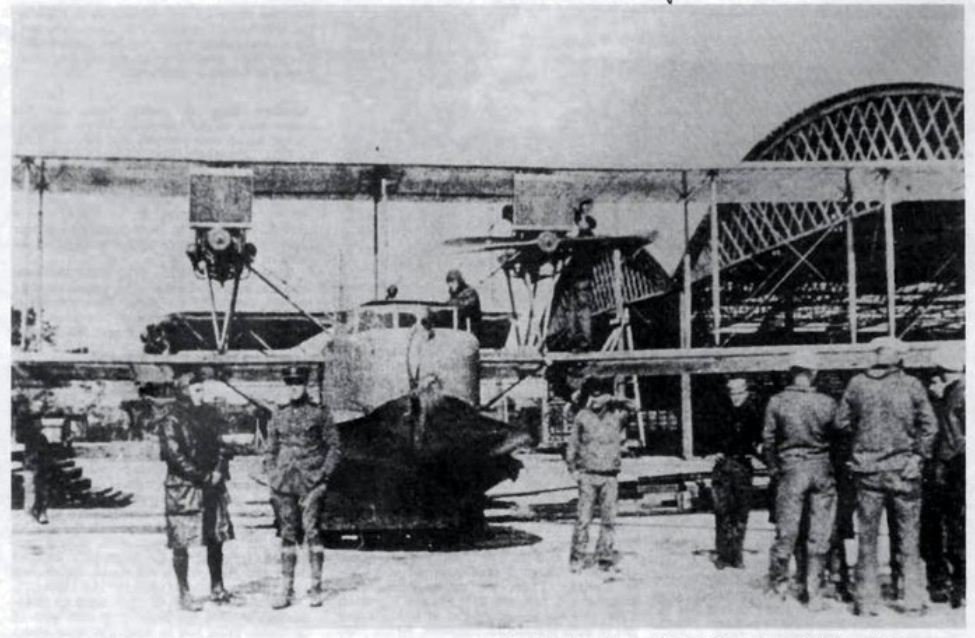
Testing Liberty engines on Curtiss H-16 seaplane at NAS Wexford

U.S. Naval Air Station Wexford was a seaplane station at Ferrybank, Wexford, Ireland which was operated by the United States Navy (USN) and commissioned on 2 May 1918. Its mission was to operate Curtiss H-16 anti-submarine patrols (ASW) to counter German submarine attacks on shipping in the area east of Queenstown. The Commanding Officer LCDR Victor D. Herbster reported on station on 28 March 1918.

== History ==
At the start of United States of America's involvement in the First World War five sites in Ireland; Queenstown, Wexford, Lough Foyle, Whiddy Island and Berehaven were identified to be operated by the United States Navy in support of allied operations against enemy submarines. Wexford was chosen to cover the sector south of NAS Lough Foyle, east of NAS Whiddy Island, NAS Berehaven and NAS Queenstown.

The construction of NAS Wexford started in March 1918 under the supervision of USN civil engineers. On 25 February 1918, USN Radio Officer Charles A. Rogers arrived in Wexford with 8 USN men. Small drafts of USN men arrived from NAS Queenstown until there were 232 men and 13 officers on station on 1 July 1918. By 1 August 1918, there were 15 officers and 298 men. By the end of October 1918, there were 20 officers and 406 men.

The location of the station was strategically critical: it lay directly at the southern entrance of the Irish Sea, within 12 miles of Tuskar Lighthouse. For over four years, Tuskar Rock was one of the most important navigational marks in Irish waters; the area became known as the Graveyard of Ships, due to the many sinkings by enemy submarines within three or four miles and in plain view of the lighthouse.

A great deal of Allied shipping to and from Ireland and England passed through nearby waters. Enemy submarines also used the Irish Sea as a short cut to and from their bases, and it was a fertile field for their operations; thus the Wexford area was a very busy with ASW activity, both offensive and defensive. Before the flying boats from this station began operations, submarines were exceptionally bold within the patrol area of Wexford. The naval air station was located along the Slaney River across from Wexford town; it was well protected from wind, waves and weather due to the almost land-locked harbor. It is also easily accessible for transportation and shipping.

There had been some work performed by British Admiralty before the US Forces arrived at Wexford; part of the concrete hangar foundations had been laid, the roads were marked off and a portion of them excavated to receive the rock base. Contracted civilian labor had also done some work in draining the field behind the site of the hangars. But at that time, it was not certain that a Naval Air Station would ever be built. The US naval men spent their first week in a general cleaning up and renovating the Bachelor Officer Quarters (BOQ), titled the Ely House and Bann Aboo while including the surrounding grounds. Both BOQ's were formerly mansions. It was a little odd to see American sailors doing housework in time of war, and in Ireland. No unnecessary work was done, however, and quickly the grounds were staked out, holes dug, posts set and building begun.

The US Naval Airmen encountered problems as supplies and insufficient clothing (coats and rubber boots) had not yet arrived. It rained incessantly, and the site was a field of mud. Working hours were from 5 am to 9 pm, and all hands took turns at standing night watches. Makeshift beds were laid on cold and damp wooden floors. Many times the men went with insufficient sleep and started the new day's work feeling worse for what rest they did have.

Tentative plans for the station were made before 15 March 1918, but when Commanding Officer Herbster arrived on 28 March 1918, many changes were made. The whole station was planned for maximum centralization; each building to be near the work to be performed and yet concentrated as far as possible into the minimum space. At the time the barracks were being erected at the rate of little better than one a day. In the meantime, civilian contract labor was working on the road construction, the concrete hangar foundations, aprons and slipway, the drainage systems, reservoir and reserve water tanks. They were also erecting the first hangar.

== Civilian workmen strike and return ==
Due to some grievance, a general strike was called by the civilian workforce during the erection of the first hangar, but the strike was soon mitigated. By 1 August 1918, there was still a considerable amount of minor work to be accomplished, and it was rapidly nearing the time for the arrival of the seaplanes. The first hangar had been completed by the civilian contractors along with the reservoir, the small water tank and majority of the road forming. The civilian workforce was dismissed on 15 August. The erection of the second hangar immediately started and the work progressed rapidly.

== Aircraft ==
When the four Curtiss H-16s arrived from Queenstown 18 September 1918, practically all construction work was finished and the station was ready to receive them. The arrival of the seaplanes marked the transition to an operational base. The very next day, aircraft sortied on their first patrol, and every day thereafter, provided the weather was at all favorable. They kept in constant touch with the station by radio.

In October 1918, another aircraft was sent to this station, one of the original four having been damaged before delivery; this made four available for duty. 6 November 1918, another arrived, making five available for ASW patrol operations. This Naval Air Station was to have 18 Curtiss H-16s upon station complement. The planes would patrol as many hours as possible during the day and be overhauled and repaired during the night. In many instances the men worked 18 hours straight for days at a time. This Naval Air Station remained accident and mishap free throughout its mission.

== Operations ==
Within three days of the start of operations and regular patrol flights, 21 September 1918, UB 104 (Type UB III) of the Flandern II Flotilla was successfully bombed in the approximate location of Lyme Bay, England by NAS Wexford aircrew. Pilot Herbert McLean Purdy was awarded the Navy Cross for this event.

On 11 October 1918, the day after RMS Leinster was sunk in the Irish Sea off Dublin, one of the US planes sighted and bombed an enemy submarine in the area. This submarine showed signs of serious distress, and had trouble submerging. Thick, dark oil was seen on the surface for about a week after the bombing.

13 October, a submarine was bombed by a plane from NAS Wexford.

Then on 16 October 1918, an H-16 aircraft out of Wexford crewed by NAS Wexford Ltjg John F. McNamara, LTjg George Shaw and NAS Queenstown LTjg James Roy Biggs dropped bombs on a submarine which disappeared under water leaving debris and oil. Although destruction seemed certain, it was assessed as "probably seriously damaged”.

Carrier pigeons were also released from time to time to test, and in several cases to meet an emergency.

Although operations at NAS Wexford ceased after only 8 weeks due to the Armistice, the planes of this station made 98 patrol flights with a total of 312 hours in the air. The flights consisted of patrol and convoy with a few instruction flights; most of the second pilots qualified as first pilots from instruction received on regular patrol.

The Intelligence Department assisted, by having complete courses mapped out, already corrected for compass error and wind deflection; this, together with reliable information from the Meteorological Department, enabled aircraft to fly on days that would otherwise have been lost.

== End of hostilities and closure ==
When the news of the Armistice was received, the planes had to be disarmed and all progressive construction and operation had to cease. Within 12 days the first draft left the station. 200 men were on their way back to the USA and the rest almost ready to leave.

With the end of the war, the U.S. Naval Air Stations in Ireland were no longer required. The Anti-submarine warfare patrols were discontinued and the aircraft were grounded and disarmed as the base closed on 15 February 1919. The slipway used for launching and retrieving the seaplanes is still visible. Of the two Bachelors Officers Quarters (BOQ), the first, Ely House, and surrounding walls also still stand, but with modifications made for an added facility to support the St John of God Hospital. The second BOQ, Bann-a-boo House, has since been modified into a hotel, which incorporates some of the original building.

== See also ==
- U.S. Naval Air Station Berehaven Ireland
- U.S. Naval Air Station Queenstown Ireland
- U.S. Naval Air Station Whiddy Island Ireland
- U.S. Naval Air Station Lough Foyle Ireland
