= Ferrybank, Wexford =

Ferrybank
- Townland
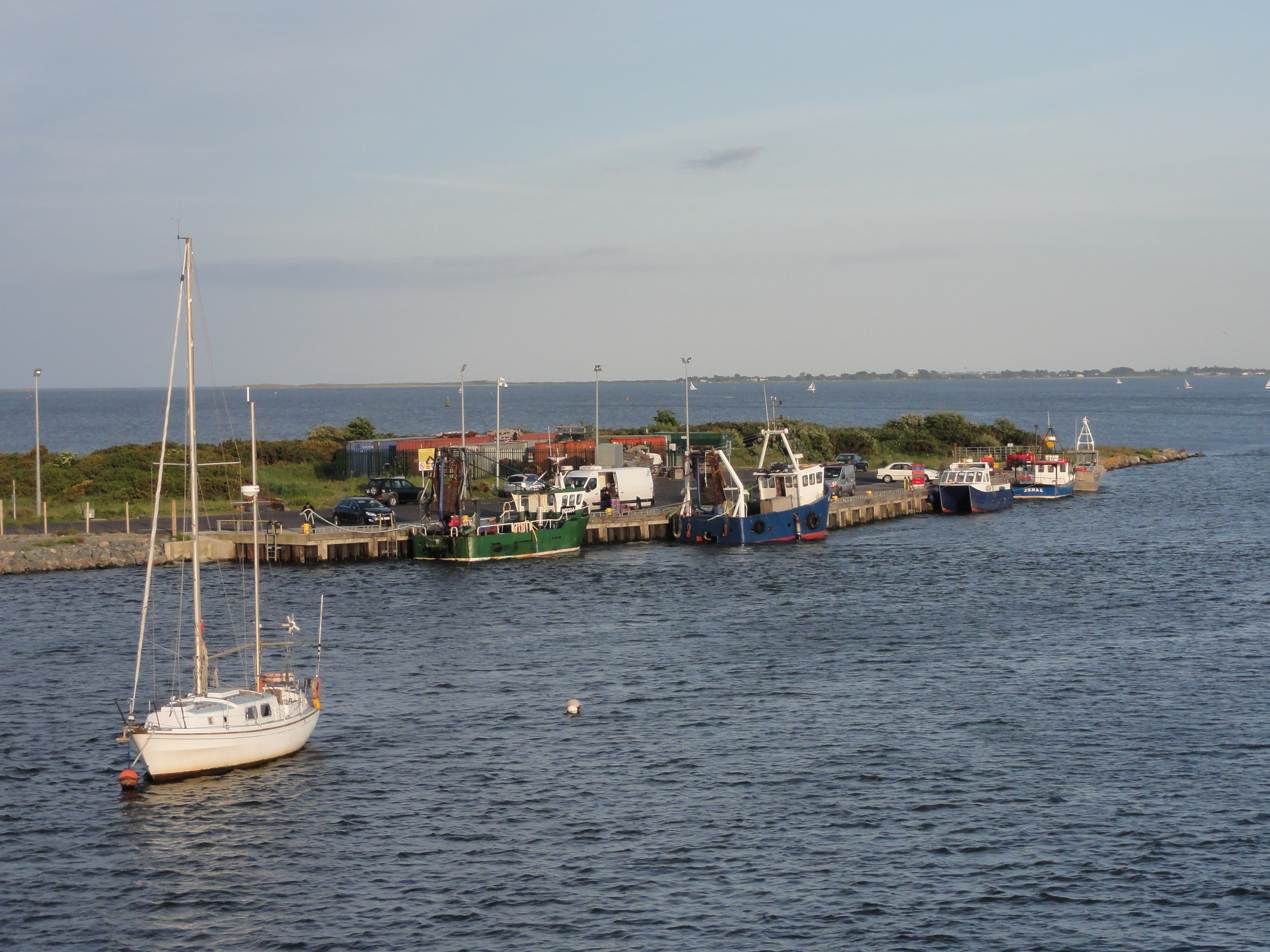
- Boats at Ferrybank South on the eastern side of Wexford Harbour

- Location in Ireland
- Coordinates: 52°20′42″N 6°27′18″W
- Country: Ireland
- Province: Leinster
- County: Wexford
- Town: Wexford
- Time zone: UTC+0 (WET)
  - Summer (DST): UTC-1 (IST (WEST))

Ferrybank is a townland near Wexford, in County Wexford, Ireland. Located to the north of Wexford Town, by the mouth of River Slaney and Wexford Harbour, it is linked to the town by Wexford Bridge.

Prior to the construction of the first Wexford Bridge in the late 18th century, the townland of Ferrybank South was a landing-point for ferryboats crossing the River Slaney from Wexford Town. In the early 20th century, Ferrybank was the site of a U.S. Naval Air Station Wexford. It operated during World War I from 2 March 1918 until 15 February 1919.
