= Ballast Bank =

Structure in Wexford Harbour, Ireland

Coordinates: 52.3378°N 6.4555°W

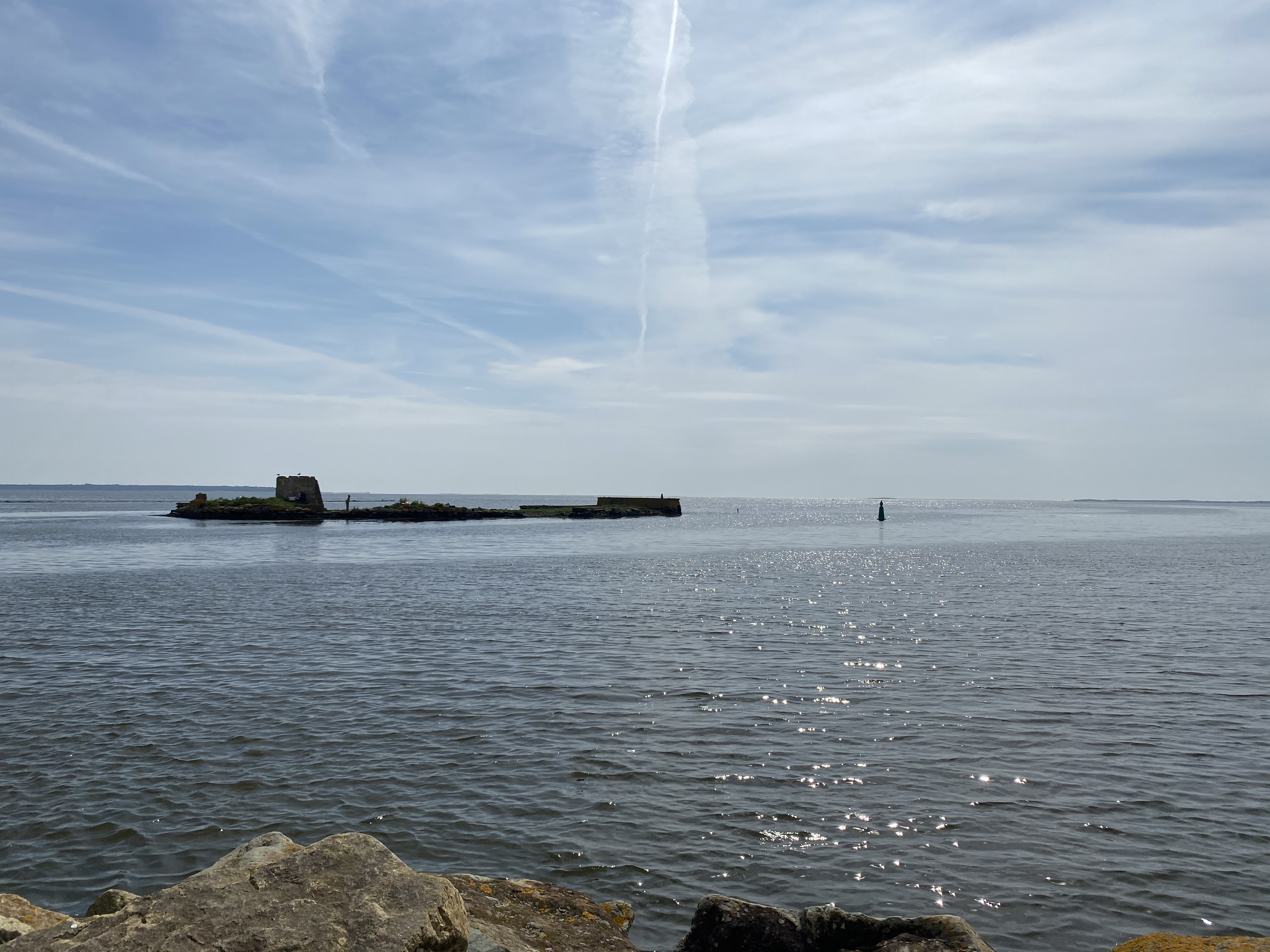
The Ballast Bank, Wexford in 2021

The Ballast Bank, situated in Wexford Harbour, Ireland, is a man made structure, built in 1832.

== Function ==
Ballast is any material used for stabilisation. In Wexford, sand was used to balance ships and boats that had offloaded their cargo. In the 19th-century, Wexford Harbour was a busy port with ships predominantly depositing cargoes of coal. In 1837, of the 583 vessels came into the port, most carried coal or timber. Departing vessels took cattle, corn, maize and butter; if sailing without cargo, ballast would be added, stabilising the vessel for its outward journey.

Prior to 1832, ballast was loaded from the quayside at a Ballast Wharf. Sand was the favoured material and was taken from the River Slaney delivered to the quays and wharves in a small boat called a gabard.

== Building and repairs ==
Wexford Harbour Commissioners paid £226 4s 8d to James Herren to build the Ballast Bank in 1832. Repairs were made to it in 1850. It was repaired again in 1872 following a report to the Wexford Harbour Commissioners by the Ballast Committee. In the report, Messrs Coghlan, Fanning and Armstrong advised of the condition of the site stating that necessary repairs would cost less than £100. In September 1872, Mr Coghlan reported to the Wexford Harbour Commissioners meeting that the work was almost complete.

== Threat of demolition ==
In 1840, demolition of the Ballast Bank and other structures in the harbour area was recommended by Captain James Vetch, a civil engineer employed by Scottish investors wishing to reclaim areas of Wexford Harbour. Their plan was eventually abandoned but reclamation work was undertaken 6 years later. Under a Royal Assent in 1846, permission was given to make alterations and repairs to the harbour, including the removal of the Ballast Bank. By 1852, some of the reclamation work had been completed. Following a public meeting to review the impact of that work, the 1846 Wexford Harbour Improvement Act was repealed. During the review, Patrick Byrne, a harbour pilot gave the opinion that the Ballast Bank impacted on the tides. He did not comment as to whether it should be removed from the harbour. The Ballast Bank continued to be used by vessels using Wexford Harbour.

== Legal protection ==
In 2009, the Ballast Bank was added to the Record of Protected Structures of County Wexford and assigned reference number WBC019.

In doing so, Wexford County Council provided the structure legal protection under Section 51 of the Planning and Development Act, 2000. It is also listed on the National Inventory of Architectural Heritage (ref: 15503132) due to its regional, architectural and technical significance.

The following year, the Wexford Harbour Commissioners responsibilities were transferred to Wexford County Council and along with it, care of the Ballast Bank.

== Current condition ==
By the late 19th century, sailing ships were replaced by steam packets. The Ballast Bank, no longer required for its original purpose, became a storage site for coal. In 1932, it was reported that the harbour was in danger of closing up due to silting, and by 1963, Wexford harbour had ceased trading as a port.

Currently in poor repair, various uses have been suggested for the Ballast Bank over the years. Local hoteliers approached the Harbour Commissioners to develop the site as an entertainment centre for tourists. In 1999, Wexford Borough Councillors proposed its use as an 'artistic feature' of the newly developed Harbour. In 2015, councillors again discussed the potential to develop a seafarer's memorial at the site. As of late 2020, no improvement works have been carried out to the site.

== Cultural references ==
Wexford playwright Billy Roche references the Ballast Bank in his work, naming it Useless Island in his semi-autobiographical novel Tumbling Down. In it, the main character, Davy Woulfe, plans his escape to the island. 'Useless Island' appears again in Roche's play Amphibians, a coming of age play, first performed by the Royal Shakespeare Company at the Barbican Centre, London in 1992.

In 2019, a portrait by artist Tony Robinson of the playwright, commissioned by Wexford Arts Centre, features Roche with the Ballast Bank in the background.

The Ballast Bank is used for the fireworks display signifying the opening of Wexford Festival Opera.

== Entertainment ==
In 1861, a Mr Collins attempted a tight rope walk from the Ballast Bank to Wexford Quay. His rope was affixed to the mast of a ship, The Fame and, after 17 minutes, and a short rest wherein he drank the good health of his friends from a flask, Mr Collins landed in Wexford Harbour as a guy rope came loose, causing him to lose balance.
