= Whiddy Island disaster =

1979 shipwreck in Ireland

- Burning wreckage of Betelgeuse near Whiddy Island on the morning of 8 January 1979

- Date: 8 January 1979; 47 years ago
- Time: Approximately 1:00 (GMT)
- Location: Whiddy Island, Ireland; 51°41′14″N 9°31′52″W
- Cause: Explosion, fire
- Deaths: 51 (50 initially, 1 salvage diver)
- Property damage: US$120+ million

The Whiddy Island disaster, also known as the Betelgeuse incident or Betelgeuse disaster, occurred on 8 January 1979, around 1:00 am, when the oil tanker Betelgeuse exploded in Bantry Bay, at the offshore jetty for the oil terminal at Whiddy Island, Ireland. The explosion was attributed to the failure of the ship's structure during an operation to discharge its cargo of oil. The tanker was owned by Total S.A., and the oil terminal was owned by Gulf Oil.

The explosion and resulting fire claimed the lives of 50 people (42 French nationals, seven Irish nationals, and one British national). Only 27 bodies were recovered. A further fatality occurred during the salvage operation with the loss of a Dutch diver.

== Background ==
Bantry Bay (Ireland)

During the 1960s, developments in the pattern of oil transportation indicated that it would soon become most economical to move oil between the Middle East and Europe using ultra large crude carrier (ULCC) vessels. These vessels were so large that they would not be able to enter most of the older ports on the Atlantic Ocean, North Sea and English Channel coasts.

Accordingly, building a new oil terminal in Europe capable of handling the largest vessels that were planned was judged appropriate. The intention was that oil coming from the Middle East would be off-loaded at this terminal and then stored for trans-shipment to European refineries using smaller vessels. The closure of the Suez Canal in 1967 as a result of the Six-Day War reinforced the economic viability of this scheme. Oil shipments had to come round the Cape of Good Hope, thus avoiding the vessel size constraints previously imposed by the canal.

In 1966, US-based Gulf Oil identified Whiddy Island, located in Bantry Bay in West Cork, Ireland, as being the most suitable site for the new terminal. Whiddy Island offered a long, sheltered, deep-water anchorage. Furthermore, it was well away from any major population centres and shipping lanes. Construction started in 1967 and the terminal was completed in 1969.

The onshore facility included a "tank farm" consisting of two tanks for ballast, two for bunker fuel oil, one for diesel oil, and twelve crude oil storage tanks, each capable of holding 81,280 tonnes, bringing the total capacity to about 1.3 million tonnes of oil. The offshore facility comprised an island type berth (known colloquially as the "jetty") 488 m (1,601 ft) in length, around 396 m (1,299 ft) from the shore. The jetty was commonly described as "a massive concrete structure" and access to it was only possible by boat. It was claimed that the jetty was capable of accommodating vessels up to 500,000 tonnes deadweight (DWT), although the first vessels of this size were not built until 1976.

The construction and operation of the terminal transformed the economy of the Bantry area. In 1968, the tanker Universe Ireland went into service for Gulf. At 312,000 DWT, it was then the largest ship in the world, intended for the transport of oil between Kuwait and Whiddy Island. Universe Ireland was the first of six such tankers planned for use by the company. The opening of the terminal was celebrated in the Clancy Brothers song "Bringin' Home the Oil", which was used as the theme for a two-minute television commercial for Gulf.

The terminal was very successful for the first five years of operation, but then events began to move against it. The Suez Canal reopened and the economics of ULCCs began to appear less satisfactory than had originally been anticipated. Shipping goods in the form of infrequent but very large loads involves engaging more idle capital in the form of stock than the alternatives. Also, the process of trans-shipment was (and remains) costly. The whole economic basis of the Whiddy terminal was incompatible with the "just-in-time" approach to industrial management which was being widely adopted at the time. That apart, the late 1970s had a levelling-off in demand for oil as the result of both economic recession and a rise in the price of oil. All these circumstances caused a fall in the use of the terminal to a level below that which had been planned. Thus, Gulf's local subsidiary struggled to maintain the viability of the terminal. The company was forced to undertake a number of cost-saving measures.

== The incident ==
On 24 November 1978, the oil tanker MV Betelgeuse left the Saudi port Ras Tanura for the Portuguese port of Leixões with a full cargo of crude oil. Built in 1968 by Chantiers de l'Atlantique in Saint-Nazaire, France, the 121,432 DWT vessel was registered by Total S.A. at Le Havre, France.

Originally, Betelgeuse was to call at Sines, Portugal, to lighten the load of the ship, but poor weather conditions prevented the vessel from entering the harbour. Plans were further frustrated at Leixões, where a ship had run aground across the harbour entrance, preventing Betelgeuse from berthing there to discharge her cargo. Betelgeuse was then instructed to sail for Whiddy Island. She first put in at Vigo, Spain, to change some of her crew, and then sailed for Whiddy Island on 30 December 1978. During the passage, the vessel encountered heavy weather in the Bay of Biscay, and after reporting a leakage of oil was instructed to head towards Brest, France, at reduced speed. However, the origin of the leak was discovered and stopped. Betelgeuse proceeded on its original planned course, arriving in Bantry Bay on 4 January 1979.

By 8 pm on 6 January 1979, Betelgeuse had completed berthing at the offshore jetty in around 30 m (98 ft) of water. At 11:30 pm the same day, the vessel commenced discharging its 114,000 tonnes of crude oil, which was expected to take about 36 hours. A number of the crew went ashore while this was in progress and the wife of one of the officers joined her husband on the vessel.

Around 1:00 am (evidence on the precise time conflicts) on Monday, 8 January, a rumbling or cracking noise was heard from Betelgeuse, followed shortly by a huge explosion within its hull. The force of the explosion was seen to blow men from the jetty into the sea. Local residents reported seeing the vessel engulfed in a ball of fire a few moments later. A series of further explosions followed, breaking Betelgeuse in half. Much of the oil cargo still on board ignited, generating temperatures estimated to exceed 1,000 °C (1,830 °F). The jetty crumbled and firefighters, arriving on the scene from several neighbouring towns, were unable to get near the vessel. The firefighters concentrated their efforts on preventing the fire from spreading to the tanks of the storage farm and on containing the oil spillage. Local families living on the island fled for their lives.

About 12 hours after the explosion, Betelgeuse sank at her moorings in 40 m (130 ft) of water, which largely extinguished the main body of the fire. In spite of this, rescue workers were not able to approach the wreck (the bow of which was still above water) for a fortnight due to clouds of toxic and flammable gas surrounding it. When deemed possible, bodies were recovered from the wreck and the remaining oil cargo was pumped.

== Aftermath ==
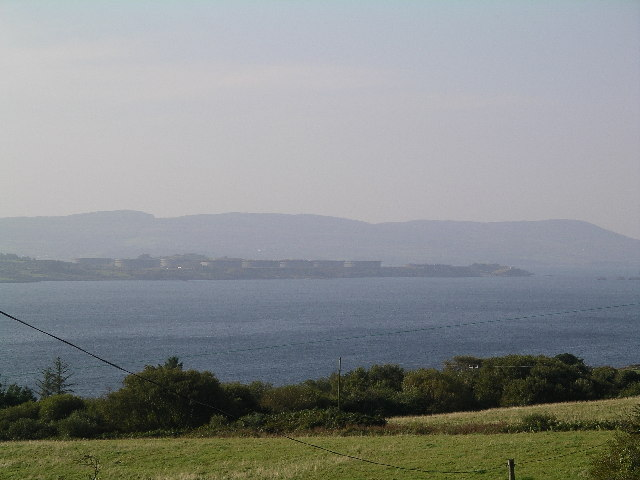
Whiddy Island Oil Terminal, taken in 2003: The view is from the north side of Bantry Bay. The three small objects in the water on the extreme right are the remnants of the concrete jetty.

Military and civilian personnel were mobilised from all over Ireland to respond to the disaster. The incident was the subject of agonised debate in the Dáil. One TD noted that there had been earlier incidents at the Whiddy Island terminal and questioned whether Gulf's status as a major employer had made the authorities reluctant to enforce a rigorous inspection regimen.

The Irish government appointed a tribunal to investigate the incident, presided over by Mr Justice Declan Costello. This tribunal took a year to hear evidence and prepare a 480-page report. The report indicated three main factors had contributed to the incident:

1. The poor condition of Betelgeuse for which its operator, Total S.A., was to blame: Immediately before the incident, the vessel's hull and tanks were cracked, corroded, and leaking. The eleven-year-old vessel had been worked hard and was at the end of her service life.
2. Incorrect unloading sequences and ballasting which resulted in the buoyancy of the hull becoming uneven and the hull therefore strained: lack of crew training or knowing malpractice were possible explanations. Total was held largely to blame for this. However, given that all the personnel involved in the unloading had died in the explosion, it was difficult to be certain as to what had happened.
3. Inadequate and poorly maintained fire-fighting and rescue systems both on the vessel and on the jetty: Gulf and Total were held jointly to blame for this. A combination of human failings and financial constraints was the immediate cause.

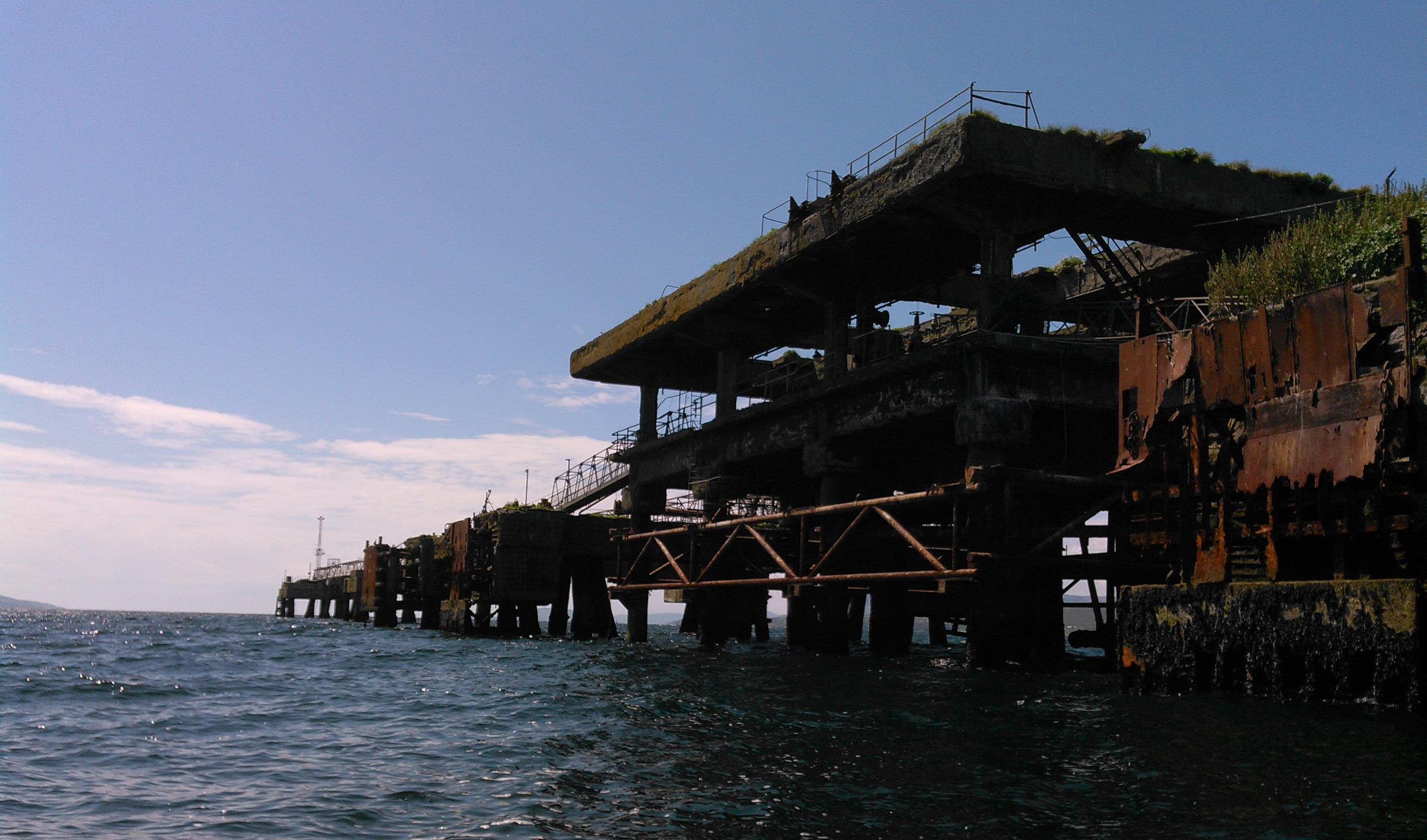
Disused tanker jetty

A faulty unloading operation was determined to have unbalanced the vessel, causing it to break its keel and thereby rupture several empty ballast tanks. Vapour from the ruptured tanks had escaped into the vessel and exploded in a fireball. However, the Costello tribunal's findings were never accepted by Total:

Total recalls its view that the tanks exploded as the result of a fire which it believes started out on the jetty. The company can but contest the report's conclusions which assume that the ballasting operations were carried out in a most unlikely way by a highly qualified crew.

— The Times, 26 July 1980. "Gulf and Total accused." (Total rejoinder to the Costello Tribunal report)

Total drew attention to the unexplained absence from his post of a Gulf employee whose duty it was to supervise the unloading from the on-shore control room. The individual concerned had left the control room some time before the trouble started (see below) and his absence may have contributed to a lack of urgency in responding to events. Exactly what happened that night has never been established beyond doubt.

All the crew aboard Betelgeuse at the time of the incident (41 in total) are believed to have died, although not all the bodies were found. In addition, one visitor to the ship (an officer's wife) and eight terminal workers were killed. Initial efforts to contain the fire were hampered by a lack of organisation and poorly maintained fire-fighting equipment at the terminal. The Bantry fire brigade spent some time waiting at the town pier for a launch to take them onto the island. The terminal's own fire engine would not start. Firefighters had to break into the terminal's main depot to access materials and equipment (much of which did not work).

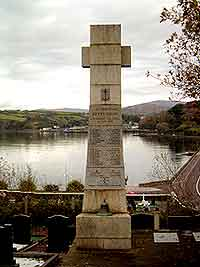
Betelgeuse memorial, St Finbarr's Church graveyard, Bantry – overlooking Bantry Harbour

Some controversy arose over the exact timing of events and the response of the terminal management to the disaster as it unfolded. Some local residents claimed up to five minutes elapsed between the audible structural failure of Betelgeuse and the time at which the initial explosion happened. If this were so, the opportunity to attempt an evacuation had been missed. However, the terminal management insisted that the explosion had almost immediately followed the structural failure:

The Tribunal singles out one man who might have raised the alarm and saved the lives of those who perished: Mr John Connolly, who was not in his post as despatcher in the control room of the terminal. To suppress that fact, Gulf personnel and the Bantry telephone operator entered into a conspiracy. False entries were made in logs, false accounts were given of the disaster, and efforts were made to avoid giving statements to the police.

— The Times, 26 July 1980. "Gulf and Total accused."

No escape from either Betelgeuse or the jetty was possible in the absence of rescue boats, given that no fixed link was built from the jetty to the shore. However, all concerned praised the initiative and courage of the firefighters and rescue workers.

A Dutch salvage firm, L. Smit & Co., raised Betelgeuse in four sections. Smit produced a documentary on the salvage. The first section (the bow) was towed out to open water, 100 mi (160 km) offshore, and scuttled. This measure attracted protests from the fishing community, so two further sections were sealed up and towed to breaking yards in Spain for disposal. A fourth section was broken up locally. During the salvage operation, the life of a diver was lost. The last section was not removed until July 1980. Local fishing grounds were badly contaminated and a clean-up was not finally complete until 1983.

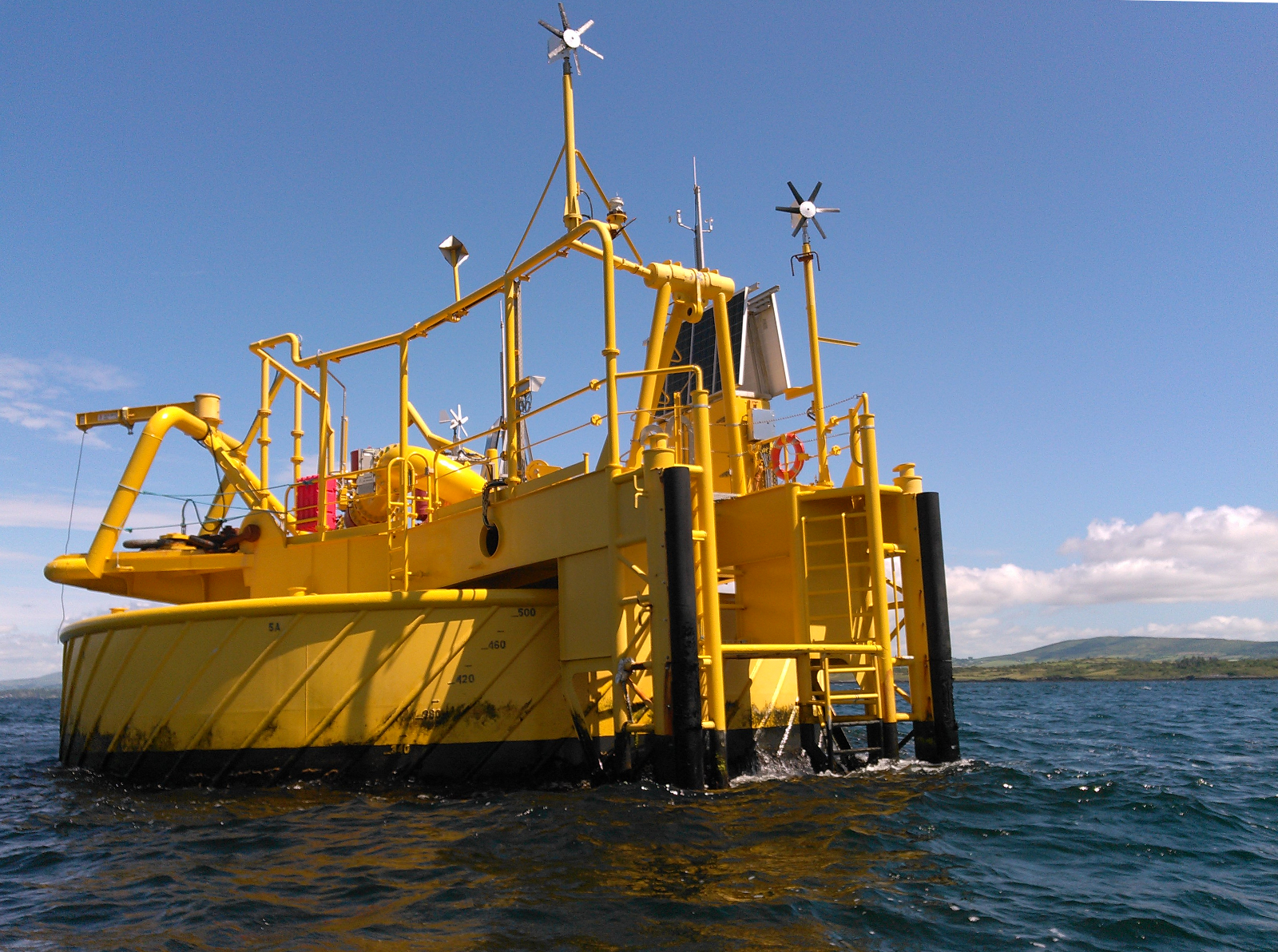
Unloading buoy

The costs of salvage, clean-up, and compensation are believed to have totalled around US$120 million. That included compensation paid by Total to Gulf. Most of the relevant costs were paid by insurance companies and all the various claims and counter-claims were eventually settled out of court.

Gulf never reopened the Whiddy Island terminal and a feasibility study in 1985 showed that it no longer had any potential use in the international oil trade. The following year, Gulf surrendered its lease on the site to the Irish government. The government used the terminal (after carrying out a limited refurbishment) to hold its strategic oil reserve. Initially, oil movement to and from the terminal was carried out by road. In 1990, at the time of the first Gulf War, an improvised repair was carried out to the jetty to allow an oil tanker to offload at the terminal on a one-off basis. In 1996, an unloading buoy was installed and this has been used since that time.

== Legacy ==
Several memorial services have been held to commemorate anniversaries of the incident. In January 2004, relatives of the victims joined with local residents in a 25th anniversary service held at St Finbarr's Church in Bantry. In 2019, on the 40th anniversary of the explosion, a commemorative ceremony was attended by the families of several victims, a number of politicians, local people and representatives of the emergency services. At the 2019 event, some family members called for improved enforcement of related safety regulations.

A memorial sculpture, incorporating the ship's bell which was recovered from the wreck of Betelgeuse, has been erected in the hillside graveyard overlooking the harbour. The bodies of two unidentified casualties from the incident are interred nearby.
