= U.S. Naval Air Station Lough Foyle Ireland =

NAS Lough Foyle
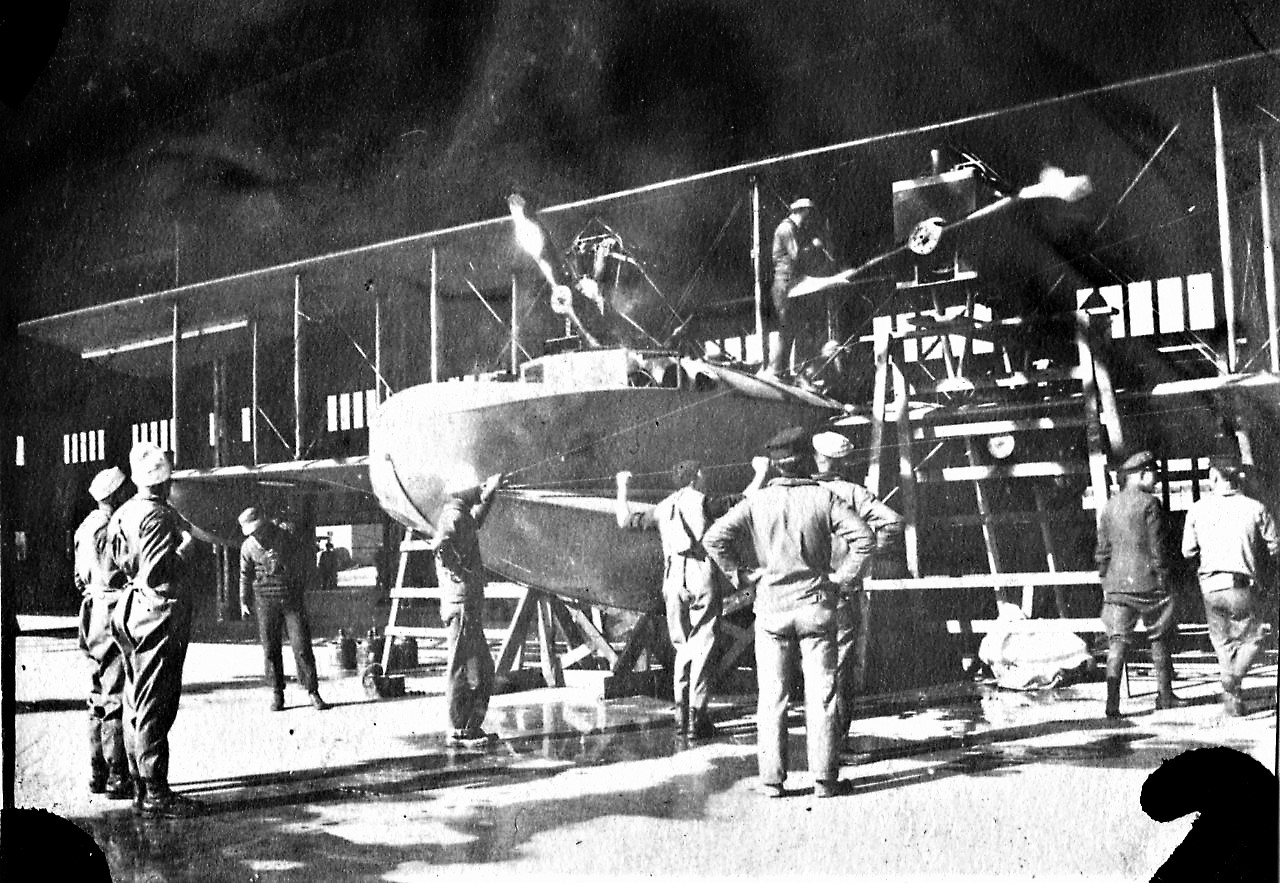
- US NAS Lough Foyle (UA 557.05 Marian Shippey Cote Collection)
- IATA: none; ICAO: none

Summary
- Airport type: Military
- Operator: United States Navy
- Location: Lough Foyle, near Quigley's Point, County Donegal, Ireland
- Built: 1918
- In use: 1918–1919
- Elevation AMSL: 1 m (3.3 ft)
- Coordinates: 55°06′15″N 007°12′47″W

Map
- Location in Ireland

U.S. Naval Air Station Lough Foyle was a seaplane station at Lough Foyle in Ireland, which was operated by the United States Navy (USN) and commissioned on July 1, 1918 with Commander Henry D. Cooke, USN as the commanding officer. Located near Quigley's Point in County Donegal, and approximately 6 miles (9.7 km) north of Derry in County Londonderry, the station was disestablished in early 1919.

== History ==
At the start of United States of America's involvement in the First World War, five sites in Ireland (Queenstown, Wexford, Lough Foyle, Whiddy Island and Berehaven) were identified to be operated by the United States Navy in support of allied operations against enemy submarines.

Local Irish labor and American construction teams worked on the site, building a control tower that still stands, accommodation and workshops, and a concrete slipway for beaching the aircraft – this is still in existence.

== Aircraft ==
In July 1918, the first Curtiss H-16 flying boats arrived in Londonderry. These had been stripped down and had to be re-assembled, a task completed by August 22, when training began. On September 1, 1918, the base became operational. Between September 3 and November 6, the flying boats completed 27 patrols – flying was possible only on 31 days. The longest patrol, on October 24, was over six hours.

== Operations ==
On October 19, 1918, while escorting a 32-ship convoy in the Lough Foyle sector off the north coast of Ireland, ENS George S. Montgomery sighted and successfully attacked an enemy submarine stalking the convoy. His bombs hit within 30 feet of the periscope and brought heavy turbulence and oil to the surface. For “probably damaging” the submarine and saving the convoy from attack, he was officially commended.

== End of hostilities and closure ==
With the end of the war, the U.S. Naval Air Stations in Ireland were no longer required. The Anti-submarine warfare patrols were discontinued and the aircraft were grounded and disarmed as NAS Lough Foyle closed on 22 February 1919.

== See also ==
- U.S. Naval Air Station Berehaven Ireland
- U.S. Naval Air Station Wexford Ireland
- U.S. Naval Air Station Queenstown Ireland
- U.S. Naval Air Station Whiddy Island Ireland
