= Whiddy Island =

Whiddy Island Oileán Faoide
- Isle
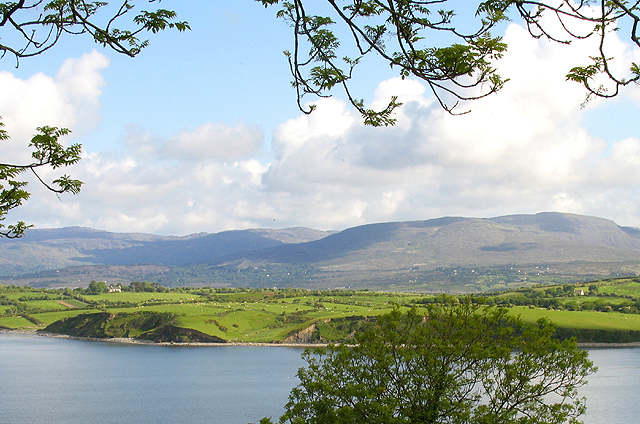
- Whiddy Island seen from the south shore of Bantry Bay

- Location in Ireland
- Coordinates: 51°41′21.88″N 09°30′01.07″W
- Country: Ireland
- Province: Munster
- County: County Cork

Population (2022)
  - Total: 31
- Time zone: UTC+0 (WET)
  - Summer (DST): UTC-1 (IST (WEST))

Whiddy Island (Irish: Oileán Faoide) is an island near the head of Bantry Bay in Ireland. It is approximately 5.6 km (3.5 mi) long and 2.4 km (1.5 mi) wide. The topography comprises gently-rolling glacial till, with relatively fertile soil. As late as 1880 the island had a resident population of around 450, mainly engaged in fishing and small-scale farming, but today the population has reduced to approximately 30 people. Previously home to Whiddy Island Naval Air Station, the island is noted for its oil terminal facilities – and the related Whiddy Island Disaster.

== Economy and tourism ==
As of the 2022 census, the island had a population of 31 people. This increases with visitors arriving during the tourist season; many staying in self-catering accommodation in the form of restored traditional island cottages.

The island is linked to the mainland by the local ferry, Ocean Star III, with return trips several times a day. Bike hire is also available on the island, as is a local hackney service. Trips to and from the island and tours of the bay are available during the summer months, incorporating local history, scenery and the indigenous flora and fauna.

Walkers and anglers also travel to Whiddy Island, and the walking trails there form part of the Sheep's Head Way walking route.

There is one pub, the Bank House, which offers food and live music during the summer months.

The present-day economy is mainly fuelled by the tourism, fishing and farming industries. Due to its mild winter temperatures, it has a local reputation for producing the region's earliest potato crop.

The island is dominated by a large oil terminal which was re-purposed in the late 20th century to store a significant portion of the Irish strategic oil reserve.

== History ==
The island's name is of uncertain origin; it could derive from Old Norse Hvít-øy, "white island."

In the early 17th century, Whiddy Island was notorious as a place where pirates traded.

=== Military history ===
Historically, the island was strategically important as it protected Bantry Bay and the bay's deepwater anchorage. As a result, the British authorities built fortified batteries on the island in Napoleonic times. This was to prevent a repeat of the arrival of a French Armada force at Bantry Bay – as had occurred in 1796.

In the last months of World War I, Whiddy became the site of a US naval air station. The US Navy's Air Wing established a seaplane base on the eastern end of the island; this became operational on 25 September 1918 when the first two Curtiss Model H planes arrived. These air crews patrolled shipping lanes around Fastnet Rock – close to where the RMS Lusitania had been sunk some years earlier. One of the base's planes crashed on 22 October 1918, killing one airman, Walford August Anderson.

The base had an operational radio station which received messages from as far away as the USA and Russia. With the Armistice of 11 November 1918, the station was no longer required and it closed in January 1919. In all, five Curtiss Model H planes were based in Whiddy during 1918: Number A1072 (a Model H-16 which crashed 22 October 1918), and numbers A1078, A1084, A3466, A4047, A4048. These H16 Large America, planes were made by Curtiss Aeroplane and Motor Company, at Buffalo, New York. They were 46 ft. long, had a wing span of 95 ft, two 400h.p. Liberty 12 engines (in a "pusher configuration"), four Lewis machine guns, a bomb load of four 230 pounders and a crew of five – consisting of pilot, two observers, a mechanic and a wireless operator.

On 28 June 2014, a memorial was unveiled on the island to Walford August Anderson, the seaplane pilot who lost his life at the American base during World War I. Anderson was part of a crew dedicated to detecting and deterring German U-Boats which posed a threat to British and American vessels, and, in October 1918, Anderson was killed in a crash at sea as his crew returned to base. The stone memorial, located close to the top of the Whiddy pontoon, was unveiled by Lieutenant Colonel Seán T. Cosden, Defence Attaché at the American Embassy, who attended the event – along with members of the Irish Air Corps.

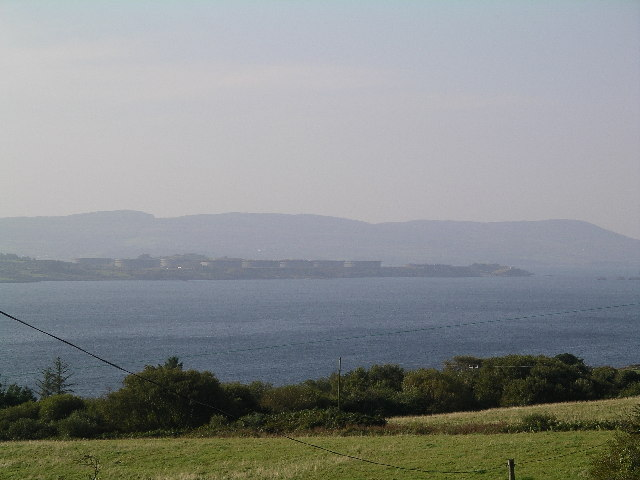
Whiddy Island oil terminal, seen from the north shore of Bantry Bay in 2003

=== Economic history ===
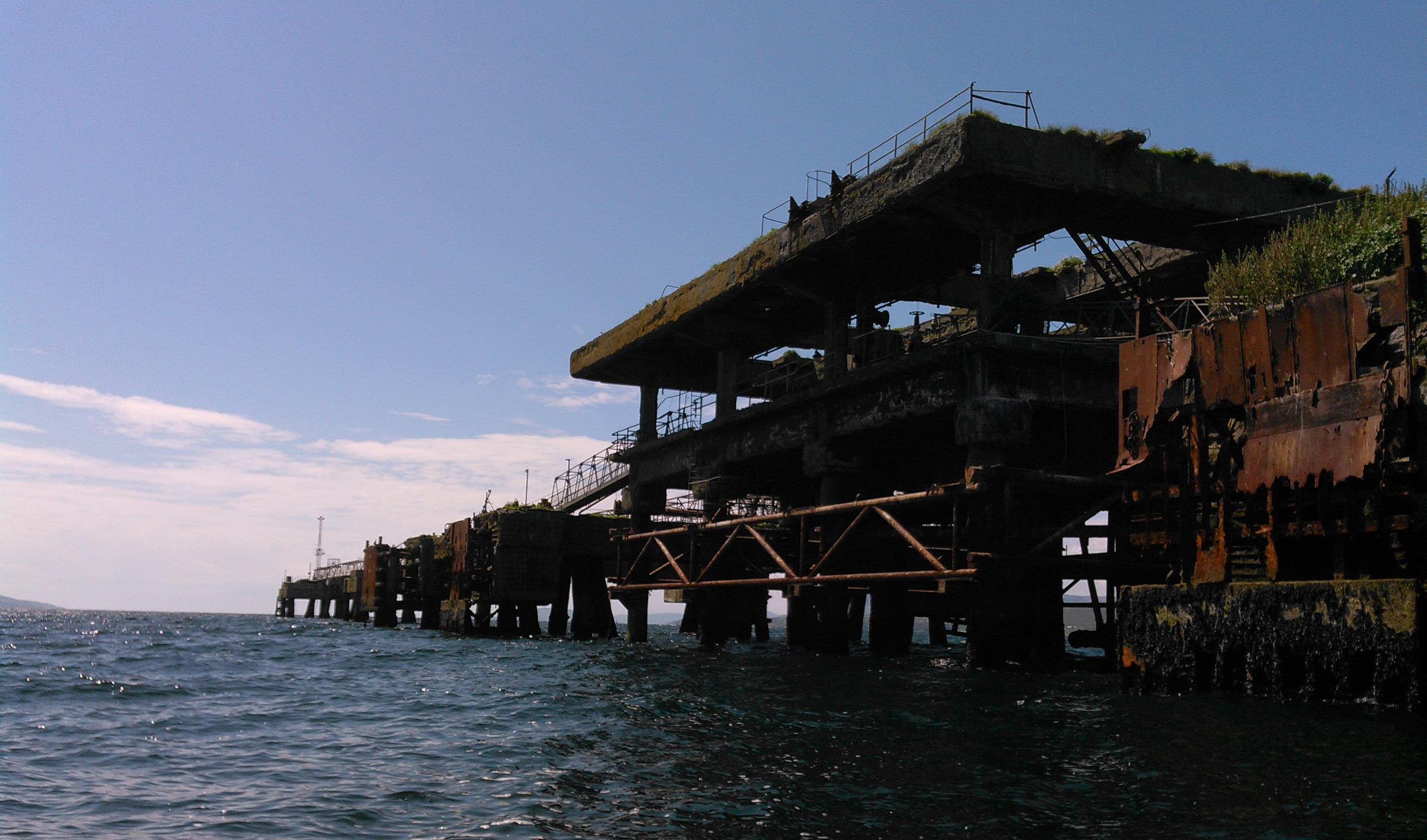
Disused tanker jetty

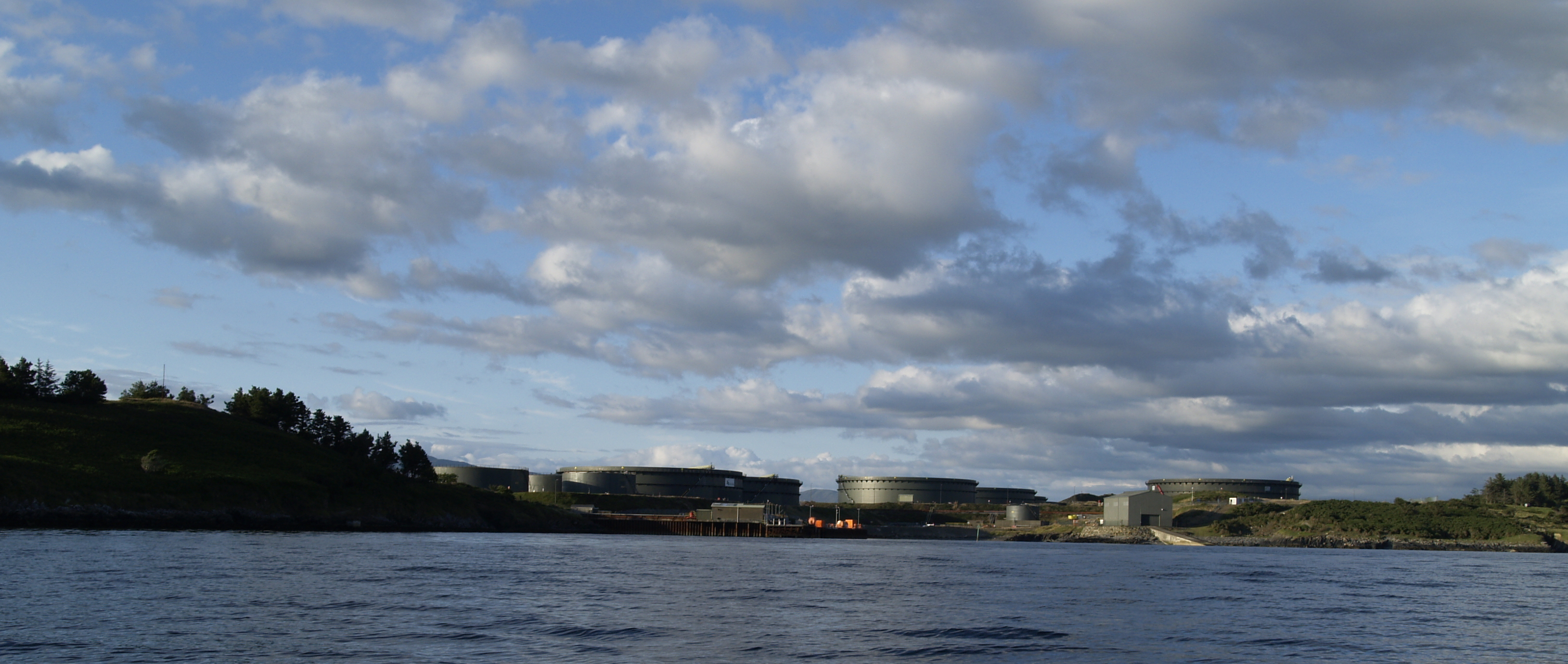
Whiddy Island oil storage tanks

Around 1900, the pilchard industry was the main source of income for the islanders. The ruins of Pilchard Palaces can be observed close to the bank.

A large oil terminal was constructed on Whiddy Island in the late 1960s by Gulf Oil. This was designed to accommodate the largest supertankers sailing directly from the Middle East.

On Monday, 8 January 1979, a French tanker, the Betelgeuse, was unloading a cargo of crude oil at the terminal when it exploded. The blast and subsequent fire killed 50 people. The Whiddy Island Disaster, or Betelgeuse incident is considered to be one of the worst maritime disasters in Irish history. The terminal, which had been operational since 1969, was never fully repaired. It was transferred to the Irish government in 1986, after which it was used to hold much of the Irish strategic oil reserve.

The terminal, which was acquired by the Canadian company Zenith Energy in 2015, was sold to the American oil company Sunoco in 2024.

=== Demographics ===
Historical population

Year	Pop.	±%
1841	729	—
1851	557	−23.6%
1861	411	−26.2%
1881	414	+0.7%
1891	347	−16.2%
1901	259	−25.4%
1911	224	−13.5%
1926	215	−4.0%
1936	167	−22.3%

Year	Pop.	±%
1946	122	−26.9%
1951	104	−14.8%
1956	95	−8.7%
1961	96	+1.1%
1966	97	+1.0%
1971	111	+14.4%
1979	57	−48.6%
1981	54	−5.3%
1986	41	−24.1%

Year	Pop.	±%
1991	34	−17.1%
1996	34	+0.0%
2002	29	−14.7%
2006	22	−24.1%
2011	20	−9.1%
2016	18	−10.0%
2022	31	+72.2%

Source: Central Statistics Office. "CNA17: Population by Off Shore Island, Sex and Year". CSO.ie.

The table reports data taken from Discover the Islands of Ireland (Alex Ritsema, Collins Press, 1999) and the Census of Ireland.

=== Archaeology ===
Archaeological remains on the island include:

- Early ecclesiastical enclosure, Kilmore
- Protestant graveyard, Kilmore
- Holy well, Kilmore
- The "Cup and Saucer", a drinking fountain made by American soldiers during World War I, Reenavanny
- Redoubts, built 1806/1807 for 100–150 men and 8–12 guns, Reenavanny
- Tower House, Reenavanny Castle of O'Sullivan Bere collapsed in storm 1920, Reenavanny

== Townlands ==
The island's townlands are: Close, Crowangle, Gorraha, Kilmore, Reenaknock, Reenavanny and Tranaha. In Reenaknock, there is a small population of feral goats which can sometimes be seen near the road close to the oil terminal.
