= U.S. Naval Air Station Queenstown Ireland =

NAS Queenstown
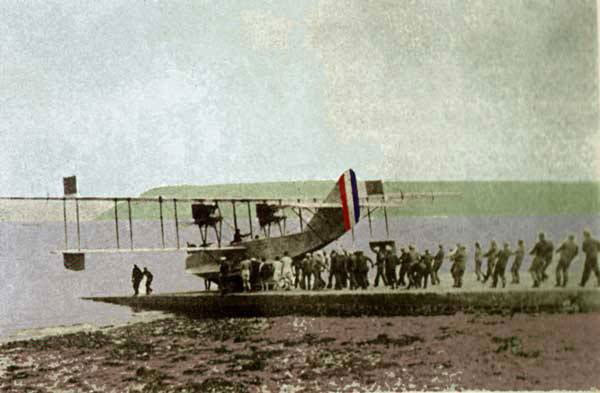
- Aircraft on slipway at Aghada
- IATA: none; ICAO: none

Summary
- Airport type: Military
- Operator: United States Navy
- Location: Aghada, County Cork, Ireland
- Built: 14 February 1918
- In use: 1918-1919
- Elevation AMSL: 1 m (3.3 ft)
- Coordinates: 51°50′N 8°13′W

Map
- Location in Ireland

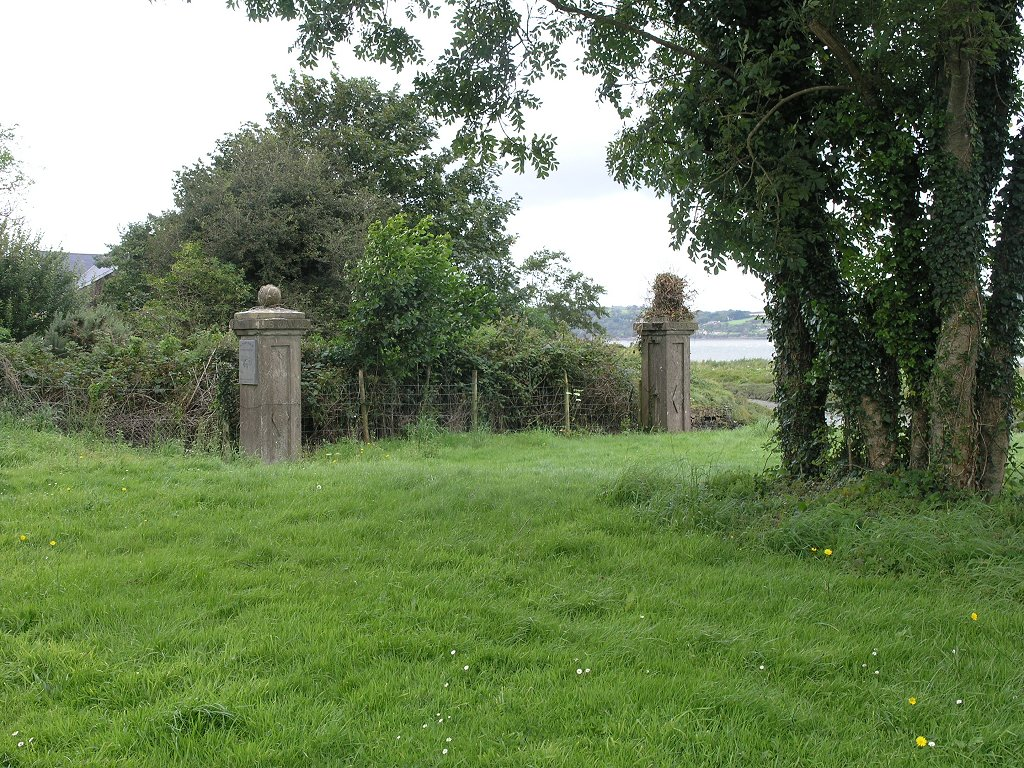
Remaining gateposts to NAS Queenstown near Aghada

United States Naval Air Station Queenstown was the first US Naval Air Station established in Ireland. NAS Queenstown was close to the village of Aghada on the eastern side of Cork Harbour (across the harbour from Queenstown/Cobh). NAS Queenstown was commissioned on 22 February 1918 with LCDR Paul J. Peyton, USNRF, Naval Aviator 47 in command.

== History ==
At the start of America's involvement in the First World War, five sites in Ireland - Queenstown, Wexford, Lough Foyle, Whiddy Island and Berehaven - were identified to be operated by the United States Navy in support of allied operations against enemy submarines. This station supplied patrols and convoys from Cape Clear on the west, south into the English Channel to the sector covered by the aerial patrols from the north coast of France, and southeast and east to the sectors covered by the stations in the southwest of Wexford and England.

On 14 February 1918, LCDR Frank R. McCrary, USN, Commanding Officer of U. S. Naval Aviation Detachment in Ireland, during World War 1, was headquartered at the location throughout the war.

The Queenstown/Aghada base was built on lands commandeered under the Defence of the Realm Act 1914.

== Operations ==
The base's six hangars and three slipways were operational by September 1918. It operated as a seaplane base, assembly and repair location for aircraft, and as a training station for pilots.

The station's aircrews, using Curtiss H-16 flying boats would fly a total of 64 war patrols and record three bombing attacks against German submarines. By the end of World War I, the base had approximately 24 planes and over 1000 personnel.

== End of hostilities and closure ==
With the end of the war, the U.S. Naval Air Station anti-submarine warfare patrols in Ireland were discontinued, with all aircraft grounded and disarmed. Armistice was on 11 November 1918, and NAS Queenstown closed 20 April 1919 - although some remnants of the slipway remain.

== See also ==
- U.S. Naval Air Station Wexford Ireland
- U.S. Naval Air Station Whiddy Island Ireland
- U.S. Naval Air Station Lough Foyle Ireland
- U.S. Naval Air Station Berehaven Ireland
