= U.S. Naval Air Station Whiddy Island Ireland =

Naval air station

NAS Whiddy Island
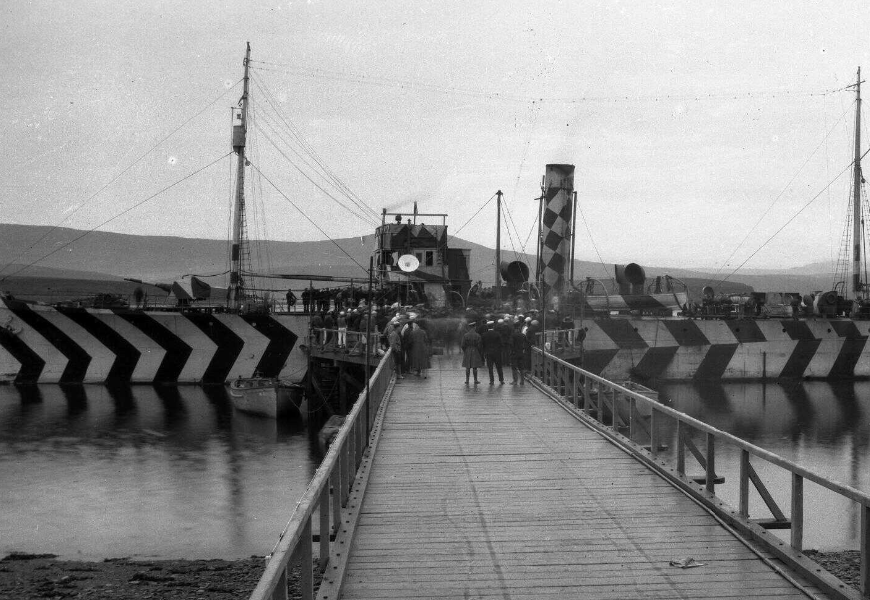
- WW1 US NAS Whiddy Island Ireland
- IATA: none; ICAO: none

Summary
- Airport type: Military
- Owner: Admiralty
- Operator: United States Navy
- Location: Whiddy Island, Bantry Bay, County Cork, Ireland
- Built: 1918
- In use: 1918–1919
- Elevation AMSL: 1 m (3.3 ft)
- Coordinates: 51°41′54″N 009°28′51″W

Map
- Location in Ireland

U.S. Naval Air Station Whiddy Island was a seaplane station operated during the last year of World War I and commissioned 4 July 1918. Located on Whiddy Island in Bantry Bay, County Cork, Ireland, it was also known as Bantry Bay Station. The base was used for anti-submarine warfare patrols by Curtiss H-16 seaplanes.

== History ==
At the start of United States of America's involvement in the First World War, five sites in Ireland -Queenstown, Wexford, Lough Foyle, Whiddy Island and Berehaven- were identified to be operated by the United States Navy in support of allied operations against enemy submarines.

The Whiddy Island station was located on the eastern side of the island in Bantry Bay. Patrols and convoys for the waters to the southwest of Ireland were furnished by this station.

In all, five Curtiss Model H planes were based in Whiddy Island during 1918: BUNO *A1072, A1078, A1084, A3466, A4047, A4048. These were "pusher" type of aircraft with the engine and propeller behind the pilot.

The H-16 Large America, were equipped with four Lewis machine guns, a bomb load of four 230 pound bombs and a crew of five - a pilot, two observers, a mechanic and a wireless operator.

Two aircrew were killed while stationed at US NAS Whiddy Island.

Joseph Leo Hogan (USNRF, AQM2, Mechanicville, NY) was lost at sea on 10 October 1918, while on the RMS Leinster when it was hit by a torpedo from UB-123.

Walford A. Anderson (USNRF, AE2, Springfield, MO) was killed in a crash after completing an air patrol for U-boats off the south coast on 22 October 1918.

While the base operated under wartime conditions for only seven weeks, patrols continued for some months after the armistice, and it was eventually closed on 29 January 1919.

== See also ==
- U.S. Naval Air Station Wexford Ireland
- U.S. Naval Air Station Queenstown Ireland
- U.S. Naval Air Station Lough Foyle Ireland
- U.S. Naval Air Station Berehaven Ireland
