= Curtiss Model K (engine) =

Model K
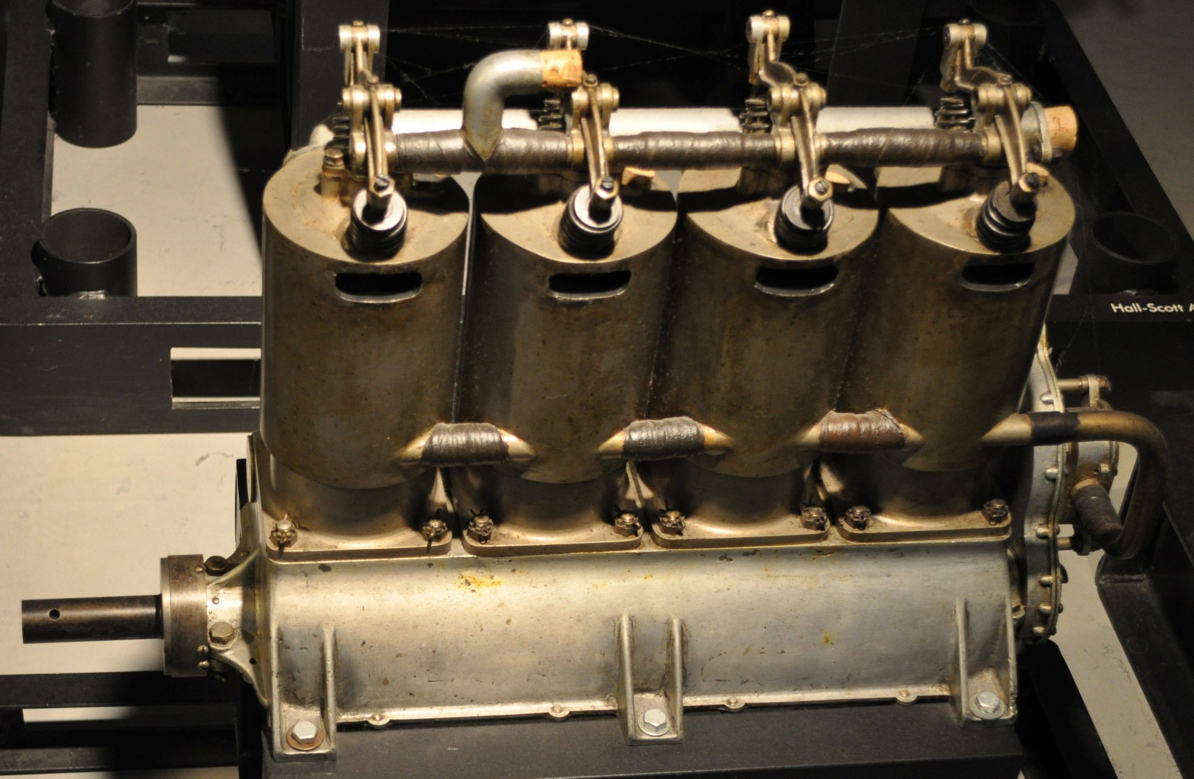
- Curtiss Model K aircraft engine on display at the Steven F. Udvar-Hazy Center
- Type: Piston aero engine
- National origin: United States
- Manufacturer: Curtiss Aeroplane and Motor Company
- Designer: Glenn H. Curtiss
- Major applications: Curtiss Model D

The Curtiss Model K, also known as the Model H, was an early aircraft piston engine with four inline cylinders.

"Among the most successful early engines marketed in the United States were those designed and built by aviation pioneer and inventor Glenn Curtiss in his factory in Hammondsport, New York. Curtiss introduced the Model K in 1911. This engine was an enlarged and improved version of an earlier Curtiss in-line air- and water-cooled power plant. Each cylinder in the engine had a single push rod and rocker arm, which operated the inlet and exhaust valves."

"The Model K powered the Curtiss Type D pusher airplane, the U.S. Army's second aircraft after the 1909 Wright Military Flyer."

== Specifications ==
=== General characteristics ===
- Type: 4-cylinder, liquid-cooled inline piston aircraft engine
- Displacement: 251 cubic inches (4.1 L)
- Length: 20 inches (508 mm)
- Width: 12 inches (305 mm)
- Height: 30.5 inches (770 mm)
- Dry weight: 175 pounds (79.4 kg)

=== Components ===
- Cooling system: liquid-cooled

=== Performance ===
- Power output: 40 horsepower (30 kW) at 1500 rpm
