= Irish maritime events during World War II =

Events that occurred to Irish ships during World War II

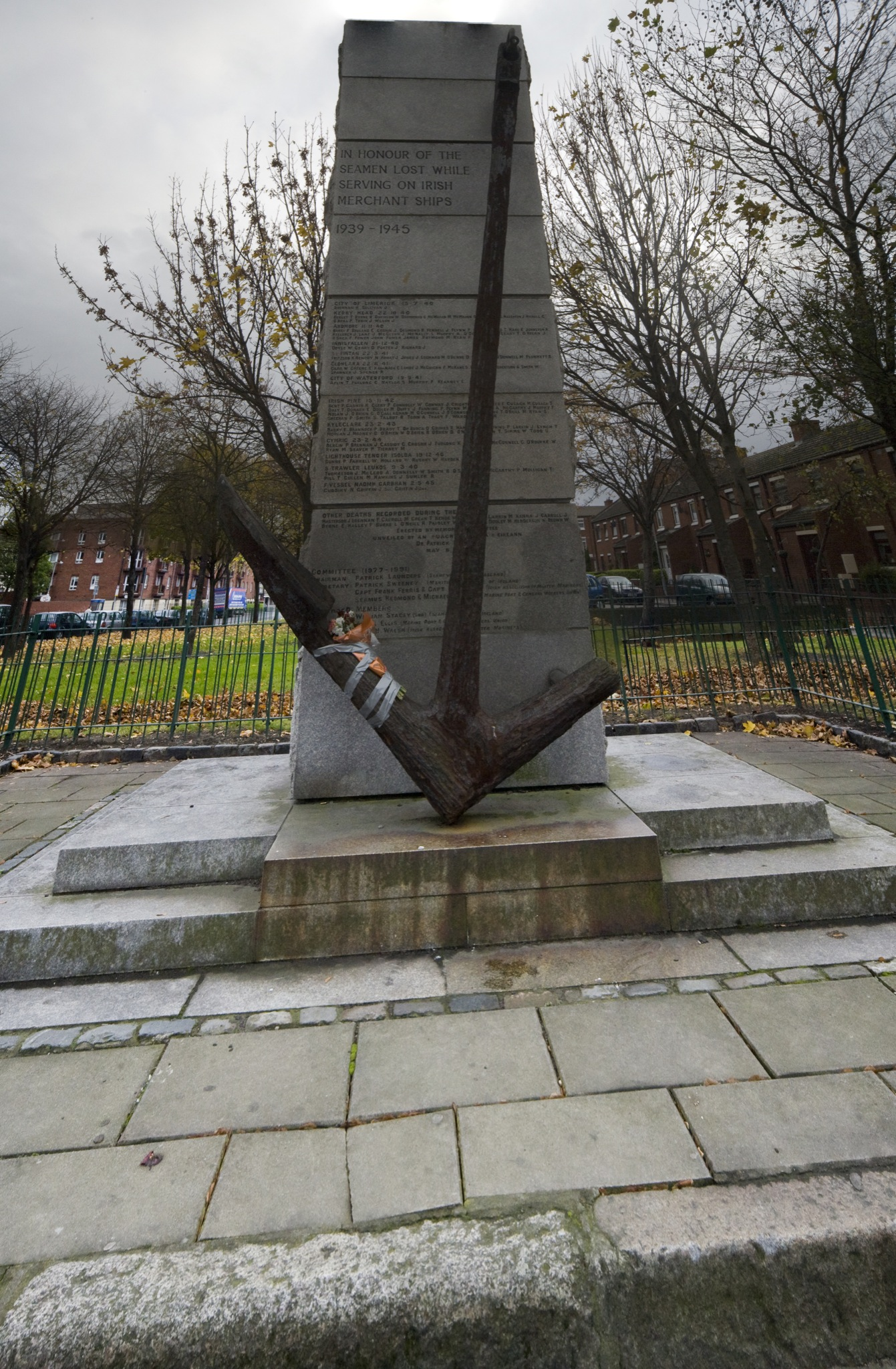
Memorial erected in Dublin in 1991 to members of the Irish Mercantile Marine lost during the Emergency

Below is the timeline of maritime events during the Emergency (Note: "The Emergency" was an official euphemism used by the Irish Government to refer to its position during World War II.) (as World War II was known in Ireland). This period was referred to as The Long Watch by Irish Mariners. This list is of events which affected the Irish Mercantile Marine, (Note: In Ireland it is the "Mercantile Marine"; in the United Kingdom it is the "Merchant Navy"; in the United States it is the "Merchant Marine". "Irish Mercantile Marine" refers to the fleet of Irish registered merchant ships, be they privately or government owned, engaged in the commerce or transportation of goods in and out of the navigable waters of Ireland.) other ships carrying Irish exports or imports, and events near the Irish coast.

== Timeline ==
In this list, the nationality of non-Irish ships is given, the phrase "British-flagged" is used for ships which transferred from the Irish registry.

=== 1939 ===
4 September 1939
SS Athenia, torpedoed by U-30, the first British ship to be sunk, Knut Nelson (Norway) lands 450 survivors in Galway.
8 September 1939
Inver tankers fleet transferred to British register. There were plans to build an oil refinery in Dublin Port. In the event, this refinery was not built. Nonetheless seven oil tankers were built in Germany for Inver Tankers Ltd. Each 500 feet (150 m) long and capable of carrying 500 tons were on the Irish register. "In a manner reminiscent of Chamberlain’s handover of the ports to de Valera, two days after the outbreak of war, de Valera himself transferred the tankers to the British registry without getting any promise of fuel supply in return. Earlier, Britain had asked Ireland to requisition the tankers. The entire fleet was lost.
11 September 1939
The Irish-flagged tanker Inverliffey, Trinidad to Coryton with 13,000 tons of gasoline was shelled and sunk by U-38. (Note: Neither the Inverliffey nor U-38 would have been aware of the registry change.)
13 September 1939
ST Rudyard Kipling was stopped and sunk 40 miles West of Clare Island, County Mayo by U-27. U-27 took the crew of 13 aboard and put them in lifeboats 5 miles from land
4 October 1939
U-35 lands survivors from Diamantes (Greek) at Ballymore, Dingle
15 December 1939
U-48 stopped the neutral Greek freighter Germaine inward from Albany New York (USA had not yet joined the war) to Cork with a cargo of maize. U-48 sank her falsely claiming that she was en route to England

=== 1940 ===
17 January 1940
Enid (Captain Wibe) of neutral Norway sailing from Steinkjer to Dublin, 10 miles north of Shetland, went to assist SS Polzella (British) which had been torpedoed by U-25, U-25 then shelled and sank Enid. Enid's crew survived. Polzella's crew were lost.
22 January 1940
Songa (Captain Lie) of neutral Norway sailing from neutral New York City to neutral Rotterdam, with a cargo of Empty barrels, sponges, motor tyres, copper, beans, coffee, cotton and tin. Torpedoed and sunk by U-25 as she was to sail through the English channel and might divert to an English port. The crew were in two lifeboats 200 miles from Ireland. One was rescued by the trawler Loddon and Landed in Kinsale. The other was guided to safety by the lighthouse keepers on Rock Island who accommodated them in their own cottages. All 24 crew survived.
2 February 1940
Munster (Capt. R. Paisley) mined and sunk while entering Liverpool. One death.
9 February 1940
Abwehr II agent Ernst Weber-Drohl landed at Killala Bay, County Sligo aboard U-37. He was equipped with a 'UFA' transmitter, a large amount of cash, and instructions for Seamus (Jim) O'Donovan, the chief IRA contact for Abwehr I/II.
3 March 1940
Cato (Capt. Richard Martin), British, from Dublin to Bristol, struck a mine laid by U-29 2.5 miles west of Nash Point. Thirteen died, 2 survived.
9 March 1940
Trawler Leukos sunk by gunfire from U-38, NW of Tory Island. Eleven died. (She may have moved between the surfacing U-boat and English trawlers, in the hope that the tricolour would protect her while the English escaped)
11 March 1940
City of Bremen rescues crew of Amor (Dutch) in the North Sea. Thirty-three saved.
12 May 1940
Kyleclare escapes from Antwerp amid an air-raid during the Battle of Belgium
27 May 1940
Uruguay of neutral Argentina sailing from Rosario to Limerick with 6,000 tons of maize, sunk with scuttling charges by U-37 160 miles from Cape Villano, Costa da Morte, Spain 43.40°N 12.16°W. Fifteen died, 13 survived.
10 June 1940
Violando N Goulandris of then-neutral Greece sailing from Santa Fe to Waterford with a cargo of wheat was torpedoed by U-48 off Cape Finisterre. Six died. Twenty-two survived. An explanation was sought from Germany.
12 June 1940
U-38 landed a German spy, Karl Simon, in Dingle. He was promptly arrested and interned for the duration.
19 June 1940
Adamandios Georgandis of then-neutral Greece sailing from Rosario to Cork with a cargo of wheat was torpedoed by U-28 south-west of Ireland 43.35°N 11.15°W. One died. Twenty-two survived. An explanation was sought from Germany.
29 June 1940
Frangoula B Goulandris of then-neutral Greece Outward Cork to St Thomas torpedoed and sunk by U-26
10 July 1940
Petsamo of Finland, inward Rosario to Cork with a cargo of maize, torpedoed and sunk by U-34, within sight of the Irish coast. Four died 51.08°N 09.22°W. The 34 survivors made landfall at Baltimore, County Cork. An explanation was sought from Germany.
11 July 1940
Moyalla rescues survivors from Athellaird (British) off Cape Clear Island. Twenty saved.
12 July 1940
Ia of Greece, inward Rosario to Cork with a cargo of wheat, torpedoed and sunk by U-99. Three died. Twenty-seven survived.
14 July 1940
Thetis A of Greece, inward Rosario to Limerick with a cargo of grain, torpedoed and sunk by U-52. Nine died. Twenty survived. An explanation was sought from Germany.
15 July 1940
City of Limerick (Capt. R. Ferguson) Cartagena to Liverpool, bombed by aircraft and sunk in Bay of Biscay, 48°46′N 12°22′W 700 miles west of Ushant, .. Two died.
15 July 1940
Naftilos of Greece, inward San Nicholas to Dublin with a cargo of grain, torpedoed and sunk by U-34. One death Twenty-seven survived. An explanation was sought from Germany.
20 July 1940
City of Waterford (Capt. T. Freehill) shelled by submarine in North Atlantic - escaped
30 July 1940
Kyleclare rescues survivors from Clan Menzies (British) 150 miles west of Loop Head, torpedoed and sunk by U-99. Six died. Eighty-eight survivors brought to Enniscrone. The British government expressed thanks and appreciation.
1 August 1940
Collier SS Kerry Head (Capt. C Drummond) Inbound Swansea to Limerick. Bombed off Kinsale, survived this attack (but, see 22 October). Responsibility was admitted by German Government and compensation paid.
15 August 1940
Meath (Capt. T. MacFariane) Belfast to Liverpool carrying 700 cattle, which all drowned. Mined and sunk off the South Stack, Holy Island, Anglesey. Crew rescued by a local fishing trawler. Three crew wounded, all survived.
16 August 1940
MV Lock Ryan (Capt. J. Nolan). Inbound Falmouth to Arklow. Bombed off Land's End. Survived.
20 August 1940
German Bomber attacked SS Macville causing damage and apparently at least one casualty. The attack also damaged the lighthouse on Blackrock Island off the coast of Mayo. Lighthouse keepers unhurt.
24 August 1940
City of Waterford (Capt. T. Freehill) bombed in Irish Sea. Survived.
26 August 1940
Campile town was bombed, probably to stop Irish exports to Britain. Three killed.
27 August 1940
Lanahrone rescues survivors from Goathland (British) off County Kerry coast. Eighteen saved.
4 September 1940
Luimneach (Capt. E. Jones) sunk by gunfire from U-46 in Bay of Biscay.
4 September 1940
Edenvale (Capt. N. Gillespie) machine-gunned by Luftwaffe off Waterford coast.
17 September 1940
Tanker Kalliopi S (Greek) Inbound Halifax to Limerick. Bombed and sunk by Luftwaffe in Sheephaven Bay location 55.11°N 7.5°W
27 September 1940
Trawler SS Kosmos machine-gunned by Luftwaffe north of Scotland.
8 October 1940
Delphin (Greece) Inward Montreal to Cork with maize and wheat, torpedoed and sunk by U-103. All survived.
17 October 1940
MV Edenvale (Capt. N. Gillespie) Limerick to Dublin. Three miles off Helvic Head, Waterford. Attacked by Luftwaffe off the coast of Waterford.
22 October 1940
Kerry Head (Capt. C. Drummond). Bombed again, all 12 hands lost, in full view of watchers on Cape Clear Island.
31 October 1940
SS Hillfern (British) Inbound Sunderland to Cork with a cargo of coal sunk by Luftwaffe NE of Kinnaird Head.
11 November 1940
Ardmore (Capt. T. Ford) struck a mine and sank, off the Saltee Islands. Twenty-four died.
11 November 1940
Survivors of the Norwegian DT Davanger which had been sunk by U-48 on 11 October with the loss of 17 lives were seen off the Mayo coast. Locals went out to assist them. Two hours later they landed at Broadhaven. All were admitted to Belmullet hospital.
8 December 1940
Schooner Penang (Finland) Inbound Stenhouse Bay, South Australia to Cobh with a cargo of grain, torpedoed by U-140 at 55.25°N 10.15°W. All 18 crew lost.
19 December 1940
Isolda (Capt. A. Bestic) a lightship tender, was sunk by Luftwaffe bombers, within sight of Carnsore Point. Six killed. Seven wounded.
20 December 1940
Cambria (British-flagged), a passenger ferry had just left Dún Laoghaire for Holyhead was attacked by Luftwaffe which had bombed Sandycove railway station injuring three. Hibernia (British-flagged) was berthing in Dún Laoghaire, a bomber swooped down, lights were extinguished and the bomber flew away.
20 December 1940
SS Lanahrone. At anchor in Liverpool docks. Damaged by falling masonry during an air-raid.
20 December 1940
21 December 1940
MV Innisfallen (Capt. George Firth) - while leaving Liverpool with 157 passengers and 63 crew. She survived an air raid on the 20th, but on departing on the following afternoon, she hit a mine off Wirral shore near New Brighton and sank. Four died.

=== 1941 ===
22 February 1941
SS Menapia Inward Cardiff to Cork, mined, survived
22 February 1941
Nailsea Lass (British) was sunk by U-48. The second officer E.J. Knight and 18 crew members landed at Ballyoughtraugh, County Kerry and the third officer and nine crew members near Berehaven, County Cork.
21 March 1941
SS Glencullen (Capt. T. Waldron) Inward Barry to Dublin. Strafed by Luftwaffe in Bristol Channel.
21 March 1941
SS Glencree (Capt. Douglas McLean) Barry to Dublin. Strafed by Luftwaffe six miles northwest of Helwick Lighthouse, Rhossili.
21 March 1941
Irish Shipping was formed as a company 51% owned by the state.
22 March 1941
Collier Saint Fintan (Capt. N. Hendry) Drogheda to Cardiff attacked by two Luftwaffe bombers, off the coast of Pembrokeshire and sunk with all hands. Nine dead.
26 March 1941
Edenvale (Capt. T. Tyrrell) bombed and strafed by four Luftwaffe planes at the entrance to the Bristol Channel.
27 March 1941
SS The Lady Belle (Capt. T. Donohue) Outward Dungarvan to Cardiff. Bombed and machine-gunned by Luftwaffe in Irish Sea.
2 April 1941
MV Edenvale (Capt. T. Tyrrell) Inward Cardiff to Rosslare. Bombed and strafed (again) by Luftwaffe in Bristol Channel.
5 May 1941
MV Dundalk damaged while at anchor in the river Mersey during an air raid.
12 May 1941
SS Menapia (Capt C Bobels) Inward Port Talbot to Rosslare. Bombed and strafed by Luftwaffe off Welsh coast. Two wounded.
15 May 1941
SS Assaroe Outward Dublin to Douglas, Isle of Man. Attacked by Luftwaffe off Howth Head.
17 May 1941
SS Glenageary (Capt R. Simpson) Inward Barry to Dublin, bombed and machine-gunned by Luftwaffe off Welsh coast.
19 May 1941
SS City of Waterford (Capt. W. Gibbons) Outward Dublin to Cardiff, bombed and machine-gunned by Luftwaffe off Welsh coast. One wounded
30 May 1941
SS Kyleclare (Capt. T. Hanrahan) Outward from Limerick to Liverpool, bombed off Waterford coast.
13 June 1941
Ferry Saint Patrick (Capt. Jim Faraday), British flagged. Outward Rosslare for Fishguard, 12 miles from Strumble Head Lighthouse, bombed by Luftwaffe. Thirty died.
22 August 1941
SS Clonlara (Capt. Joseph Reynolds) Cardiff to Lisbon, in convoy OG71 ("Nightmare Convoy") rescued 13 from the Scottish ship Alva, but was later torpedoed and sunk by U-564 off the coast of Spain. Thirteen survivors and 11 dead.
17 September 1941
Schooner Crest (Capt. William Brent) wrecked following grounding on a sandbank in the Bristol Channel, while avoiding mines.
19 September 1941
SS City of Waterford (Capt T. Alpin) in convoy OG 74, collided with the Dutch tug Thames and sank in the North Atlantic, the crew were rescued by HMS Deptford and transferred to the Walmer Castle. Two days later Walmer Castle was bombed, killing five of the survivors from City of Waterford.
7 October 1941
MV Kerlogue Inward Swansea to Wexford, struck a mine in Cardigan Bay.
16 October 1941
MV Edenvale Outward Cork to Lisbon, off the Cork coast, aerial attack, presumed Luftwaffe.
25 October 1941
SS Glenageary (Capt. N. Kelly) Inward Barry to Dublin, aerial attack
26 October 1941
SS Margaret Lockington Newry to Swansea, off the County Waterford coast, aerial attack
29 October 1941
SS Lanahrone Inward Vigo to Dublin, Off Saltee Islands, aerial attack.
5 November 1941
SS Glencree Inward Newport, Monmouthshire to Dublin off the Welsh coast, aerial attack. Two wounded.
5 November 1941
SS Glencullen (Capt A Jones) Inward Barry to Dublin. Strafed in the Irish Sea.

=== 1942 ===
7 March 1942
Schooner Lock Ryan wrecked on Donegal coast.
2 June 1942
SS City of Bremen inbound Lisbon to Dublin, bombed in the Bay of Biscay.
11 August 1942
Irish Rose rescues survivors from Wawaloam (American), sunk by U-86 in Atlantic. All 7 crew saved.
13 August 1942
Irish Pine rescues survivors from Richmond Castle (British), sunk by U-176 in Atlantic. Nineteen saved.
26 August 1942
Irish Willow rescues survivors from Empire Breeze (British), sunk by both U-438 and U-176 at 49°22′N 35°52′W while in convoy ON 122, in Atlantic. Forty-seven saved. One lost.
17 September 1942
Irish Larch rescues survivors from Stone Street (Panamanian), from convoy ON 127, sunk by U-594 in Atlantic. Forty saved. Thirteen lost.
7 November 1942
Irish Beech rescued 13 survivors of the Roxby of convoy ON 142. She was sunk by U-613 at 49.35°N 30.32°W with the loss of 34 lives.
15 November 1942
Irish Pine Boston to Dublin, torpedoed and sunk by U-608, in North Atlantic. Thirty-three died.
30 November 1942
SS Kyleclare (Capt F Dawson) bombed in the Bay of Biscay.
12 December 1942
Irish Poplar collided with launch Eileen and Cork harbour pilot Carraig-An-Cuan during force 8 gale, in Cork harbour, Five died.

=== 1943 ===
23 February 1943
SS Kyleclare (Capt A Hamilton) Inbound Lisbon to Dublin with wheat and sugar torpedoed in North Atlantic position 48.5°N 13.2°W by U-456. Eighteen died.
15 May 1943
Irish Oak Inbound Tampa, Florida to Dublin, torpedoed and sunk by U-607, 700 miles west of Ireland. Crew rescued by Irish Plane 8 hours later.
2 June 1943
SS City of Bremen (Palgrave Murphy) bombed and sunk in the Bay of Biscay. All 11 crew lost.
23 October 1943
MV Kerlogue (Capt Desmond Fortune) attacked by the No. 307 Polish Night Fighter Squadron of the RAF in the Bay of Biscay. Four wounded. Help refused by RAAF.
29 December 1943
MV Kerlogue (Capt Thomas Donohue), with a crew of 11, rescued 164 Germans from the Bay of Biscay.

=== 1944 ===
22 March 1944
Cymric (Capt. C. Cassidy) lost between Ardrossan and Lisbon. Eleven dead.
21 July 1944
Irish Fir (Capt, J.P. Kelly) reports a 'near miss' torpedo attack in North Atlantic.
20 December 1944
Schooner Mary B Mitchell was wrecked in the Solway Firth during a gale.

=== 1945 ===
12 March 1945
U-260 having been damaged by a mine, was scuttled by her crew at 51.15°N 09.05°W, two miles from Union Hall, County Cork. The 48 crew were interned in the Curragh. It has become known as the "Glandore sub".
24 April 1945
Monmouth Coast (Capt. Albert Henry Standen) (British) Sligo to Liverpool, 80 miles from Sligo, torpedoed and sunk by U-1305. Sixteen died. One survived.
2 May 1945
Motor Trawler FS Naomh Garbhan; off the Wexford Coast, struck a mine and sank. Three died.

== See also ==
- Irish Mercantile Marine during World War II main article
- Irish neutrality during World War II – international relations
- MV Kerlogue – the exemplar of neutral Irish ships during World War Two.
- The Emergency (Ireland) – internal, national issues during World War II
- Timeline of the Second Battle of the Atlantic

== Bibliography ==
- Forde, Frank (2000) [1981]. The Long Watch. Dublin: New Island Books. ISBN 1-902602-42-0.
- Griven, Brian (2006). The Emergency. London: Macmillan. ISBN 978-1-4050-0010-9.
- Gray, Tony (1997). The Lost Years. London: Little Brown and Company. ISBN 0-316-88189-9.
- Coogan, Tim Pat (2003). Ireland in the Twentieth Century. London: Jutchinson. ISBN 0-09-179427-7.
- Duggan, John P (2003). Herr Hempel. Irish Academic Press. ISBN 0-7165-2757-X.
- Kennedy, Michael (2008). Guarding Neutral Ireland. Dublin: Four Courts Press. ISBN 978-1-84682-097-7.
- Eunan, O'Halpin (2008). Spying on Ireland. Oxford: Oxford University Press. ISBN 978-0-19-925329-6.
- Spong, H. C. (1982). Irish Shipping Ltd., 1941-1982. World Ship Society. ISBN 978-0-905617-20-6.
- MacGinty, Tom (1995). The Irish Navy. Tralee: The Kerryman. ISBN 0-946277-22-2.
- Wills, Clair (2007). That Neutral Island. London: Faber and Faber. ISBN 978-0-571-22105-9.
- Carroll, Joseph T (1998). Ireland in the war years. International Scholars Publications. ISBN 978-1-57309-186-2.
- Dwyer, T Ryle (1982). De Valera's Finest Hour. Cork: Mercier Press. ISBN 0-85342-675-9.
- Fisk, Robert (1983). In Time of War. London: André Deutsch. ISBN 0-233-97514-4.
  (Later republished as:Fisk, Robert (1996). In Time of War: Ireland, Ulster and the Price of Neutrality, 1939-45. Gill & Macmillan Ltd. ISBN 978-0-7171-2411-4.)
- McIvor, Aidan (1994). A History of the Irish Naval Service. Dublin: Irish Academic Press. ISBN 0-7165-2523-2.
- Share, Bernard (1978). The Emergency. Dublin: Gill and Macmillan. ISBN 071710916X.
