= Coast Watching Service =

The Irish Defence Forces established a Coast Watching Service in the run up to World War II, known in the Republic of Ireland as The Emergency, while the State remained neutral. Between 1939 and 1942 the construction of 83 Lookout Posts, LOPs, took place at strategic points (every 5–15 miles) along the Irish coastline and the local volunteers (Coastwatchers) serving at these posts were responsible for monitoring the Irish coastline for belligerent activity at sea. The LOPS were designed by Howard Cooke RIBA of the Irish Office of Public Works in 1939.

After the hostilities ended most of these buildings were abandoned and some were removed. Traces of a significant number remain in place and some are in relatively good repair. In general, structures in more isolated locations have tended to remain in place.

== Coast watchers ==
Coast watchers worked around the clock in pairs on eight- or twelve-hour shifts. One man operated the telephone inside the LOP, the other patrolled outside. They had to report every activity observed at sea or in the air in the vicinity of their LOP. Each LOP was assigned a unique identifying number starting with "LOP 1" in County Louth and continuing in a clockwise direction around the coast finishing with "LOP 82" at Inishowen in County Donegal.

LOP 83 is located between LOP 35 and LOP 36 in County Kerry

== Log books ==
Each LOP had to keep a record of any activity at sea or in the air, and a number of logbooks have survived and are held by the Irish Military Archives. The number of surviving logbooks for each post and a sample ledger is available in the table below.

== EIRE markings ==
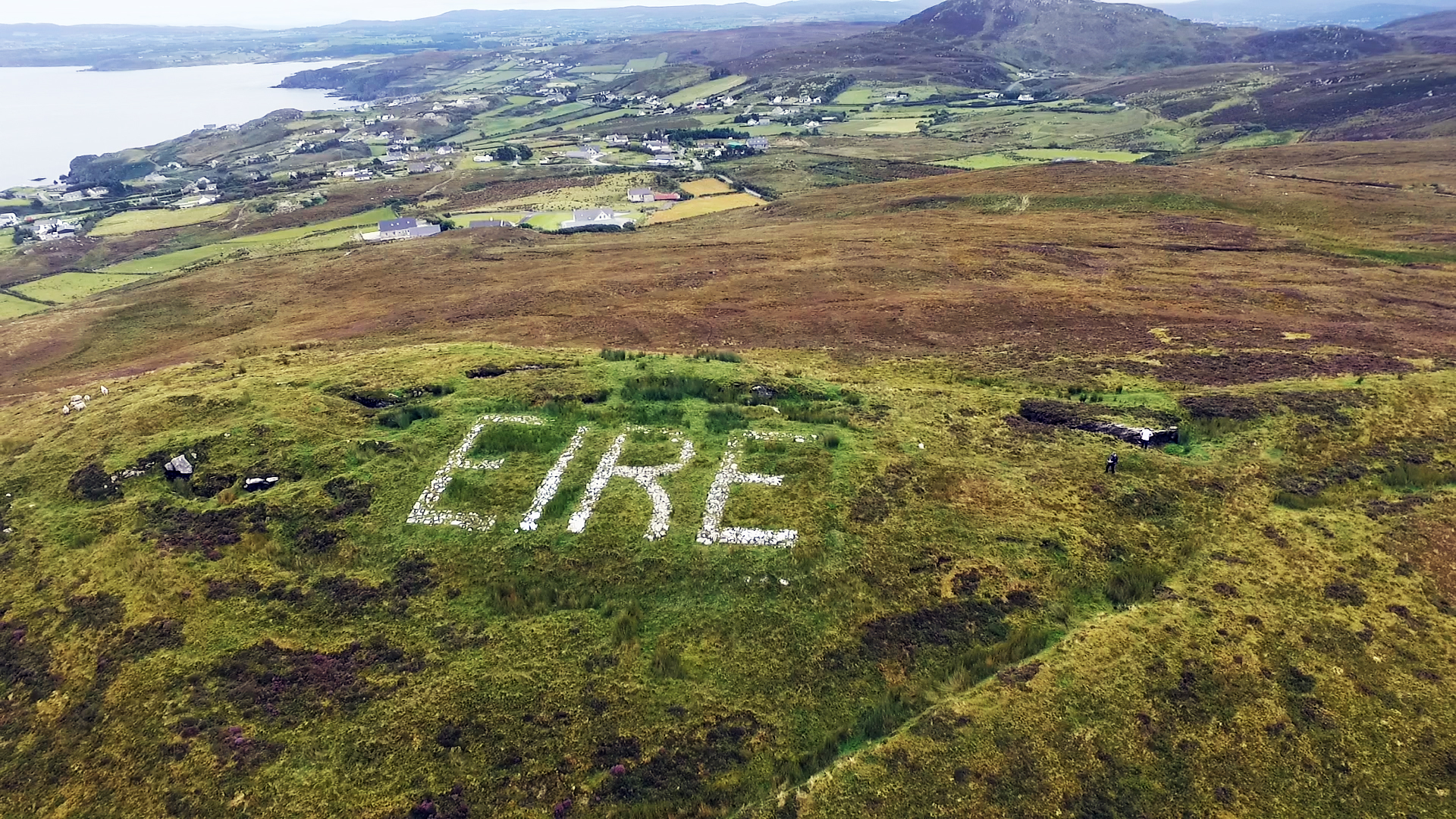
EIRE Sign at Glengad Head, Ireland.

Following the construction of the network of lookout posts along the coast of Ireland, it was decided to add large signs marking the coast as EIRE. According to Michael Kennedy's book on the coastwatching service, Guarding Neutral Ireland, it was "a way to reduce the number of aircraft landing because their crews had lost their bearings". Kennedy's research indicates that these signs were constructed at the behest of the American authorities.

A number of signs such as the one at Cahore Point, County Wexford were built too small initially and so larger signs were built over them at a later stage. A number of the signs still exist in varying states of repair, mostly along the west of the country. Some signs have been renovated such as the one in Loop Head, County Clare and Dursey Island, County Cork.

== Table of Lookout Posts ==
List of World War 2 Lookout Posts around Ireland's Coastline
LOP	Name	County	Latitude	Longitude	Google Maps	Bing	Condition	Log Books	EIRE Mark	EIRE Mark Condition
1	Ballagan Point	Louth	53°59'47.63"N	6° 6'57.53"W	View	View	Good	4	X	X
2	Dunany Point	Louth	53°51'34.29"N	6°14'21.96"W	View	View	Poor	5	X	X
3	Clogher Head	Louth	53°47'39.60"N	6°13'11.83"W	View	View	Dangerous	6	EIRE_3	Overgrown
4	Cardys Rock	Dublin	53°37'45.92"N	6°11'15.76"W	View	View	Collapsed	5	X	X
5	Rush	Dublin	53°31'15.65"N	6° 4'34.35"W	View	View	Good	8	X	X
6	Howth Head	Dublin	53° 22' 15.9899"N	6° 3'18.81"W	View	View	Restored	2	EIRE_6	Excellent
7	Dalkey	Dublin	53° 16' 17"N	6° 5' 36.9398"W	View	View	Restored	6	EIRE_7	Excellent
8	Bray Head	Wicklow	53°10'33.02"N	6° 4'28.71"W	View	View	Collapsed (Blocks Remain)	8	EIRE_8 / Image	Overgrown, Not Visible
9	Wicklow Head	Wicklow	52°57'54.55"N	5°59'58.51"W	View	View	Good (In Use)	7	EIRE_9 / Image	Not Visible
10	Kilmichael Point	Wexford	52°43'55.81"N	6° 8'38.79"W	View	View	Good	None	X	X
11	Cahore Point	Wexford	52° 33' 47.8001"N	6° 11' 41.1"W	View	View	Collapsed (under restoration)	6	X	under restoration
12	Ballyconnigar Hill	Wexford	52°25'59.60"N	6°19'28.24"W	View	View	Gone (Erosion)	12	X	Gone (Erosion)
13	Greenore Point	Wexford	52°14'26.03"N	6°18'51.63"W	View	View	Good	5	X	X
14	Carnsore Point	Wexford	52°10'33.50"N	6°21'47.58"W	View	View	Good	7	X	X
15	Forlorn Point	Wexford	52°10'22.59"N	6°35'33.40"W	View	View	Good	5	X	Not visible, being restored
16	Hook Head	Wexford	52° 7'25.40"N	6°55'49.51"W	View	View	Gone	5	X	Gone, replaced by car park
17	Brownstown Head	Waterford	52° 7'40.09"N	6'25.76"W	View	View	Good	5	X	X
18	Dunbratton Head	Waterford	52° 7'59.96"N	7°18'25.11"W	View	View	Good	3	X	X
19	Helvick Head	Waterford	52° 3'12.48"N ?	7°32'15.45"W ?	View	View	Collapsed	1	X	X
20	Ram Head	Waterford	51°56'32.03"N	7°42'36.38"W	View	View	Good	9	X	X
21	Knockadoon	Cork	51°52'43.44"N	7°52'21.97"W	View	View	Good	2	EIRE_21	Excellent
22	Ballycotton	Cork	51°49'30.09"N	8° 0'41.03"W	View	View	Gone	7	X	X
23	Power Head	Cork	51°47'7.58"N	8°10'24.69"W	View	View	Good	2	X	X
24	Flat Head	Cork	51°42'58.79"N	8°21'12.71"W	View	View	Good	6	X	X
25	Old Head of Kinsale	Cork	51°36'19.81"N	8°31'58.11"W	View	View	Gone	4	X	X
26	Seven Heads	Cork	51°34'15.66"N	8°42'59.34"W	View	View	Good (2 LOPs)	6	X	X
27	Galley Head	Cork	51°31'50.76"N	8°57'15.98"W	View	View	Good	6	X	X
28	Toe Head	Cork	51°29'21.04"N	9°13'13.77"W	View	View	Good (In Use)	8	EIRE_28	Good (1, 2)
29	Baltimore	Cork	51°28'28.23"N	9°21'14.12"W	View	View	Collapsed, Walls Remain	9	EIRE_29	Barely Visible
30	Mizen Head	Cork	51°27'15.80"N	9°48'47.02"W	View	View	Good	5	EIRE_30	Ruins, Not Visible
31	Sheep's Head	Cork	51°32'48.06"N ?	9°49'20.50"W ?	View	View	Good	2	EIRE_31	Good
32	Dursey Head	Cork	51°35'54.45"N	10° 7'52.36"W	View	View	Good	7	EIRE_32	Ruins, Barely Visible
33	Lambs Head	Kerry	51°44'25.76"N	10° 7'54.75"W	View	View	Good	5	EIRE_33	Excellent
34	Bolus Head	Kerry	51°47'34.13"N	10°20'12.10"W	View	View	Good	6	X	X
35	Bray Head	Kerry	51°53'8.52"N	10°25'29.48"W	View	View	Good	6	EIRE_35	Ruins, Barely Visible
83	Foileye Head / Feaklecally	Kerry	52° 1'15.39"N	10° 8'53.62"W	View	View	Good	1	X	X
36	Eask Head	Kerry	52° 6'56.35"N	10°16'54.41"W	View	View	Good	5	EIRE_36	Dismantled, Barely Visible
37	Parkmore	Kerry	52° 6'22.18"N	10°21'25.50"W	View	View	Gone, Some Remains	2	X	X
38	Dunmore Head	Kerry	52° 6'36.47"N	10°28'25.08"W	View	View	Good	5	X	X
39	Sybil Head	Kerry	52°11'0.06"N	10°27'52.92"W	View	View	Poor	None	X	X
40	Brandon Point	Kerry	52°17'16.97"N	10° 9'48.67"W	View	View	Good	5	X	X
41	Fenit	Kerry	52°16'9.04"N	9°51'48.47"W	View	View	Gone	3	X	X
42	Kerry Head	Kerry	52° 24' 42.93"N ?	9° 55' 53.7899"W ?	View	View	Gone	4	X	X
43	Leck Head	Kerry	52°32'11.89"N	9°40'15.30"W	View	View	Collapsed, Blocks Remain	3	X	X
44	Kilcreadun Point	Clare	52° 34' 56.0701"N	9° 42' 35.05"W	View	View	Good	7	X	X
45	Loop Head	Clare	52° 33' 37.12"N	9° 56' 1.7401"W	View	View	Collapsed	5	EIRE_45	Excellent
46	Georges Head	Clare	52°42'7.77"N	9°38'5.88"W	View	View	Good	7	X	X
47	Hag's Head	Clare	52°56'53.69"N	9°28'4.38"W	View	View	Only Base Remaining	2	X	X
48	Black Head	Clare	53° 9'14.19"N	9°15'53.67"W	View	View	Only Base Remaining	7	EIRE_48a / EIRE_48b (2 Marks)	Good
49	Spiddal	Galway	53°14'33.99"N	9°19'35.38"W	View	View	Only Base Remaining	5	X	X
50	Kilronan	Galway	53° 7'38.79"N	9°42'8.04"W	View	View	Good	5	EIRE_50a / EIRE_50b (2 Marks)	Good
51	Golam Head	Galway	53°13'51.62"N	9°45'19.52"W	View	View	Good	6	X	X
52	Mace Head	Galway	53°19'32.44"N	9°54'7.56"W	View	View	Good	4	X	X
53	Slyne Head	Galway	53°24'53.73"N	10° 6'55.08"W	View	View	Good	4	EIRE_53	Barely Visible
54	Auchrus Point	Galway	53°32'57.63"N	10° 9'57.95"W	View	View	Gone	3	X	X
55	Renvyle	Galway	53°36'11.52"N	10° 3'0.67"W	View	View	Good	3	EIRE_55	Barely Visible
56	Rossroe	Galway	53°37'20.20"N	9°51'57.14"W	View	View	Good	4	X	X
57	Roonagh	Mayo	53°45'47.49"N	9°53'59.41"W	View	View	Good	4	X	X
58	Corraun	Mayo	53°51'54.85"N	9°54'15.67"W	View	View	Good	5	EIRE_58	Barely Visible
59	Moyteogue Head	Mayo	53°57'44.10"N	10°11'43.89"W	View	View	Good	1	EIRE_59	Good
60	Blacksod Bay	Mayo	54° 6'14.86"N	10° 5'51.70"W	View	View	Poor	10	EIRE_60	Barely Visible
61	Annagh Head	Mayo	54°14'30.14"N	10° 6'22.87"W	View	View	Collapsed, Blocks Remain	7	EIRE_61	Barely Visible
62	Erris Head	Mayo	54°18'2.35"N	10° 0'0.78"W	View	View	Poor, Collapsing	6	EIRE_62	Barely Visible
63	Portacloy, Benwee Head	Mayo	54°20'35.34"N	9°46'49.74"W	View	View	Poor, Roof Collapsed	12	EIRE_63	Good
64	Downpatrick Head	Mayo	54°19'36.98"N	9°20'49.69"W	View	View	Good	9	EIRE_64	Good
65	Kilcummin Head	Mayo	54°16'56.80"N	9°12'55.41"W	View	View	Good	10	X	X
66	Lenadoon Point	Sligo	54°16'49.60"N	9° 2'28.40"W	View	View	Good	4	X	X
67	Aughris Head	Sligo	54°16'32.24"N	8°46'2.00"W	View	View	Good	4	X	X
68	Rosskeeragh	Sligo	54°20'51.54"N	8°40'18.25"W	View	View	Collapsed, Blocks Remain	4	X	X
69	Mullaghmore	Sligo	54°28'13.77"N	8°27'31.23"W	View	View	Good	10	EIRE_69	Ruins ("E" Identifiable)
70	St. John's Point	Donegal	54°34'12.50"N	8°27'16.42"W	View	View	Good	9	EIRE_70	Excellent
71	Carrigan Head	Donegal	54°37'10.46"N	8°40'47.24"W	View	View	Collapsed, Blocks Remain	8	EIRE_71	Ruins, Visible
72	Rossan Point	Donegal	54°42'4.70"N	8°46'47.34"W	View	View	Good, Roof Collapsed	5	EIRE_72	Ruins, Barely Visible
73	Dunmore Head	Donegal	54°50'41.16"N	8°29'9.53"W	View	View	Good	4	X	X
74	Crohy Head	Donegal	54°55'13.35"N	8°27'10.38"W	View	View	Good	2	EIRE_74	Excellent
75	Arranmore Point	Donegal	55° 0'48.37"N	8°32'40.23"W	View	View	Gone, Base Remains	1	EIRE_75	Barely Visible
76	Bloody Foreland	Donegal	? 55° 8'51.01"N	? 8°17'17.09"W	View	View	Gone	4	EIRE_76	Overgrown, Barely Visible
77	Horn Head	Donegal	55°12'57.27"N	7°58'45.87"W	View	View	Good	12	EIRE_77	Barely Visible
78	Melmore	Donegal	55°14'13.92"N	7°48'18.60"W	View	View	Good	2	EIRE_78	Overgrown, Barely Visible
79	Fanad Head	Donegal	55°16'37.61"N	7°38'1.22"W	View	View	Good	17	EIRE_79	Overgrown, Not Visible
80	Malin Head	Donegal	55°22'52.02"N	7°22'27.29"W	View	View	Good	20	EIRE_80	Excellent
81	Glengad Head	Donegal	55°20'22.95"N	7°10'48.87"W	View	View	Good	6	EIRE_81	Overgrown, Barely Visible
82	Inishowen Head	Donegal	55°14'9.01"N	6°55'37.97"W	View	View	Good	18	EIRE_82	Overgrown, Barely Visible

== See also ==
- Donegal Corridor
- Irish Neutrality WW2
