= Prayer Before Birth =

1944 Irish poem

"Prayer Before Birth" is a poem written by the Irish poet Louis MacNeice (1907–1963) at the height of the Second World War. Written from the perspective of an unborn child, the poem expresses the author's fear at what the world's tyranny can do to the innocence of a child and blames the human race for the destruction that was gripping the world at the time.

== Background and publishing history ==
Unlike most of his countrymen, MacNeice opposed Ireland's neutral stance in the war, disdaining the lack of opposition to fascism. To this effect, he published a poem called "Neutrality" in 1943, which criticized his country's stance and spent the war years in London, contributing to the war effort by writing propaganda for the BBC.

"Prayer Before Birth" first appeared in print in 1944, the first poem in MacNeice's volume Springboard.

== Interpretation ==
The poem is an agonized plea from the mouth of an unborn infant in its mother's womb. The unborn baby pleads with God to hear him out before he is born into this ruthless world. The child seeks protection from the Divine and begs forgiveness for all the deeds of evil that it shall commit once it is out of the mother's protective care. Dramatic in intensity, the poem makes a sweeping statement on the deplorable state of the world. Living is a painful experience, being born is a terrifying one.

The child's plea is a representation of the poet's anguish, grief and fear in a world that has steadily metamorphosed into a hell. The poet paints a picture of a world devoid of compassion, love and remorse through the haunting appeal of the unborn infant. The poem reflects the poet's utter dejection and hopelessness expressing the thought that the world will not correct itself, but perpetuate its evils in an ever-ascending spiraling pattern of violence. The foregone conclusion that the child will live a life of treason and its apology proffered in advance for its death after it has lived as a "lethal automaton", offers a picture of a world akin to nothing but hell.

MacNeice makes use of alliteration and assonance: "strong drugs dope me, with wise lies lure me" to create rhythm in the poem. The repetition of "I am not yet born" is used to give it the ritualised quality of a prayer.

The author also talks of being a "cog in a machine" - this shows that he feels that society will mould the child to become part of everything else around him, he will be worthless, insignificant and merely a part of an entire collaboration. The uses "I" and "me" as the first and last words of each stanza contributes to an assertion of individuality in a time of mass mobilisation and of the mass extermination of individuals who belonged to the wrong category.

The poem also contains many religious themes and overtones through the use of double-imagery; the child could be seen as a metaphor for Christ, making reference to certain themes and events said to have occurred during his ministry on earth.
