= Sheila Murphy =

Sheila Murphy may refer to:

- Sheila Murphy (poet), American poet
- Sheila Murphy (diplomat), Irish diplomat
- Sheila Cockrel, née Murphy, American politician
