= Eagle Owl (disambiguation) =

The eagle owl is a bird species.

Eagle Owl may also refer to:

- Heinkel He 219 Uhu (Eagle Owl), a German World War II night fighter
- Focke-Wulf Fw 189 Uhu, a German World War II reconnaissance aircraft
- Eagle Owls, nickname of No. 307 Polish Night Fighter Squadron, which fought alongside the Royal Air Force during World War II
