= SS Irish Oak (1919) =

Irish-operated steamship, sunk during World War II

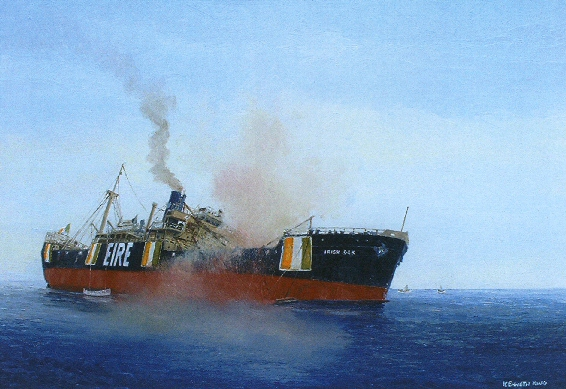
- Oil painting by Kenneth King depicting the moments after the Irish Oak was torpedoed after first lifeboat had just been lowered (National Maritime Museum of Ireland).

History
- Name: West Neris (1919–41); Irish Oak (1941–43)
- Owner: United States Maritime Commission (1919–28); Mississippi Shipping Company (1928–33); United States Shipping Board (1933–35); United States Shipping Board Bureau (1935–37); United States Maritime Commission (1937–43)
- Operator: United States Shipping Board (1919–28); Mississippi Shipping Company (1928–33); United States Shipping Board (1933–35); Laid up (1935–41); Irish Shipping Ltd (1941–43)
- Port of registry: (United States) New Orleans (1919–41); (Republic of Ireland) Dublin (1941–43)
- Route: Cork – Tampa (1941–43)
- Builder: Southwestern Shipbuilding, San Pedro, Los Angeles
- Yard number: 11
- Launched: 24 August 1919
- Completed: December 1919
- Out of service: 1935–41
- Identification: United States official number 219434 (1919–41); United Kingdom official number 159359 (1941–43); Code letters LVFP (1919–33); Code letters KOTK (1934–41); Code letters EINY (1941–43)
- Fate: Torpedoed and sunk, 15 May 1943
- Notes: Built to Design 1019

General characteristics
- Tonnage: 5,589 GRT; tonnage under deck 5,084; 3,483 NRT; 8,542 DWT
- Length: 410.5 ft (125.1 m)
- Beam: 54.3 ft (16.6 m)
- Depth: 27.2 ft (8.3 m)
- Installed power: 359 NHP
- Propulsion: Triple-expansion steam engine, Llewellyn Iron Works, Los Angeles
- Speed: 10.5 knots (19.4 km/h)

Location of where Irish Oak was torpedoed.

SS Irish Oak was an Irish-operated steamship that was sunk in the North Atlantic during World War II by a German submarine. As the West Neris, she had been built in the United States and operated by the US Shipping Board. In 1941, she was chartered by Irish Shipping Limited to transport wheat and fertilizer from North America to Ireland. Sailing as a clearly marked neutral vessel and not in convoy, she was nonetheless torpedoed and sunk by U-607 on 15 May 1943 midway between North America and Ireland with the crew being rescued.

There were then both conflicting reports that she had not, and allegations that she had, warned a nearby convoy of the presence of a U-boat. The British nationality of her captain became an issue in the June 1943 Irish general election, there were diplomatic exchanges between the United States and the Republic of Ireland and questions raised in the British House of Commons. In Germany, the U-boat's captain received a mild reprimand.

== Construction ==
Southwestern Shipbuilding of San Pedro, California, was organized in 1918 to build cargo ships for the United States Shipping Board. As Yard No. 11, the ship was built to Design 1019, launched on 24 August 1919 and completed in December 1919. Her gross register tonnage was 5,589 tons, length 410 feet 5 inches (125.10 m), with a beam of 54 feet 3 inches (16.54 m), and a depth of 27 feet 2 inches (8.28 m).

Propelled by a triple expansion steam engine built by the Llewellyn Iron Works of Los Angeles with cylinders of 24.5 inches (62 cm), 42.5 inches (108 cm) and 72 inches (180 cm) bore and 48 inches (120 cm) stroke, the ship could go 10.5 knots (19.4 km/h).

== West Neris ==
West Neris had been built for the United States Maritime Commission (USMC) and operated by the United States Shipping Board (USSB), her port of registry being New Orleans.

In 1928, she was sold to the Mississippi Steamship Company. She was sold back to the USSB in 1933. With the abolition of the USSB, she was transferred to the United States Shipping Board Bureau in 1935, and laid up in New Orleans. During this period the ship was neglected and the condition of her engine deteriorated. In 1937 she was transferred to the United States Maritime Commission. On 26 September 1941 she was chartered to Irish Shipping Ltd, through United States Lines at £3,245 per month.

== Irish Oak ==
=== Background ===
At the outbreak of World War II, Ireland had very few ships, and the United States instructed its ships not to enter the "war zone". Acting for the Irish government, Minister Frank Aiken negotiated the charter of two oil-burning steamships from the US Maritime Commission's reserve fleet. These were the West Neris and the West Hematite. Two Irish crews travelled to New Orleans to take over the ships, doing so on 9 September 1941.

The West Neris was renamed Irish Oak, and the West Hematite was renamed Irish Pine. Both were chartered by the government-owned Irish Shipping Limited (ISL) and managed by the Limerick Steamship Company, with their port of registry changed to Dublin. The Irish Oak was captained by Matthew Moran of Wexford, the Irish Pine by Frank Dick of Islandmagee with Samuel McNamara of Belfast as chief engineer.

=== Initial sailing, convoys and delays ===
Destined to carry wheat and phosphate fertilizer, both ships sailed initially from New Orleans for St. John's, Newfoundland, in October 1941 to take on cargoes of wheat bound for Ireland. Since insurers like Lloyd's of London charged higher premiums for ships not in convoy, the Irish Oak and the Irish Pine were painted wartime camouflage in preparation for sailing in convoy. Irish Pine joined Convoy SC 56 and arrived in Dublin on 11 December 1941. In contrast, Irish Oak experienced a number of serious mishaps and setbacks: Chief Engineer R. Marsh, of Dublin, suffered a heart attack and was hospitalised in New Orleans; another engineer, O'Keefe of Dún Laoghaire, was severely burned in a boiler room blow-back and hospitalised in St. John; and a locally recruited Greek replacement engineer caused difficulties, was reported to the Canadian authorities by the captain and jailed.

Initially, Irish Oak sailed with Convoy SC 52, which departed from Sydney, Nova Scotia, on 29 October 1941. On 3 November, the convoy was attacked by U-202 and U-203 and lost four ships, turned back for Sydney and arrived on 5 November. However, neglect had left the Irish Oak in poor condition. Ships from SC 52 were merged with Convoy SC 53, and Irish Oak sailed with it but had to return to Sydney. Her next attempt was with Convoy SC 55, which departed Sydney on 16 November 1941 and arrived at Liverpool on 5 December. However, engine problems struck again, and she was towed to St. John, New Brunswick. Irish Oak remained in St. John for four months while efforts were made to repair her engine. Eventually she had to be towed to Boston for repairs. The voyage from New Orleans to Dublin - including repairs - took nine months: Irish Oak berthed in Dublin on 6 July 1942.

=== Out-of-convoy sailings ===
The crew of the Irish Oak became acutely uneasy after her engine failed, and she was left behind by SC 55, dead in the water to wait for a tugboat. That and the experiences of other Irish ships, especially in OG 71, the "Nightmare Convoy" in August 1941, resolved Irish crews and owners to sail as neutrals, out of convoy. Thereafter, Irish ships were clearly marked and fully lit, usually sailed out-of-convoy on a direct course and always answered SOS calls for assistance. Irish ships rescued 534 men; (Note: 534 lives were saved, excluding rescues by lifeboats, fishing trawlers and other craft. Most sources say 521, which comes from a list of rescues in Appendix 4 of Frank Forde's book. However, that list omits the rescue of 13 survivors from the Roxby by the Irish Beech,) but they lost 20% of their seamen.

Irish Shipping Limited built up its fleet to 15 ships. Two ships were lost, Irish Oak, and Irish Pine, with 33 lives. The ISL ships alone saved some 166 lives.

=== Stornest ===
At 04:44 on 14 October 1942, in very bad weather, Irish Oak received a distress call from the British ship Stornest, a straggler from convoy ONS 136, torpedoed by U-706. Irish Oak answered the call and altered course. Six minutes later, Stornest radioed Irish Oak of abandoning ship in life-rafts since they had lost their lifeboats in the heavy seas. Irish Oak continued to relay Stormest's SOS and spent ten hours to search for survivors in a westerly gale. The rescue tug Adherent, the anti-submarine trawler Drangey and two corvettes from convoy ONS 137 joined the search to no avail. Stornest lost her crew of 29 and ten gunners at sea.

A week later Captain Matthew Moran was fatally injured while boarding at the Dublin quayside when the gangway collapsed beneath him. He was replaced by Captain Eric Jones (see Crew).

=== Encounter with U-650 ===
On 14 May 1943, Irish Oak was en route from Tampa, Florida, to Dublin with a cargo of 8,000 tons of phosphate fertiliser. Smoke from an allied convoy was visible ahead in the distance, and Irish ships then generally sailed out of convoy.

At 2.23 p.m., German U-boat U-650 came alongside. There was no contact or exchange between the vessels. They continued alongside each other all afternoon. At nightfall, Irish Oak turned on her lights in accordance with her neutral status. Apparently satisfied, U-650 departed during the night. Irish Oak continued sailing astern of Convoy SC 129.

As it happened, on the same day, U-642 reported that an aircraft carrier (the escort carrier HMS Biter with the 5th Escort Group) was joining the convoy. In fear of the aircraft, the stalking U-boats were ordered to "break off operations against convoy".

=== Torpedoed ===
As dawn broke the next morning, 15 May 1943, a torpedo hit Irish Oak at 8:19am (12:19 German Summer Time). Two torpedoes were launched. One missed, and the other struck her port side and exploded.

At the time, which submarine had launched the torpedoes was uncertain. Its periscope remained visible as lifeboats were lowered. The submarine waited until the lifeboats were well clear before firing a coup de grâce at 9:31 a.m. Irish Plane, Irish Rose and Irish Ash responded to the SOS. The survivors were located by Irish Plane at 4:20 p.m.

Irish Oak lies in position 47°51′N 25°53′W, almost midway between Newfoundland and Ireland.

=== Landfall ===
The survivors landed at Cobh on 19 May. They were welcomed by Samuel Roycroft, a director of both the Limerick Steamship Company and of Irish Shipping Limited. They lunched at the Imperial Hotel, Cork. On arrival in Dublin on 21 May, they were welcomed by Peadar Doyle, the Lord Mayor, and were hosted to lunch at Leinster House, home of Dáil Éireann (the Irish Parliament), on 24 May.

It was common practice for crews' wages to be stopped when a ship was sunk. The famed Labour leader James Larkin raised the issue of the survivors' treatment in the Dáil. Citing the crew member who was told by the Labour exchange to "go and get his record card", which was lost when Irish Oak sank, he suggested for the Dáil to ask the German Consul-General to send a submarine to retrieve it.

== Aftermath ==
=== British ===
Which submarine had sunk Irish Oak was unknown at the time. The survivors knew only that it was unlikely to have been U-650. In the British House of Commons, Sir William Davidson called for a formal protest because Irish Oak had not warned the convoy, and Douglas Savory called for an end of coal exports to Ireland.

No official action was taken. Ireland was exporting food to Britain at the time. Also, Paul Emrys-Evans revealed that the convoy knew about the U-boat; the British stance was that as it already knew of the presence of both Irish Oak and U-607, there was no need for Irish Oak to have warned the convoy.

=== Irish ===
During World War I, the South Arklow Lightvessel Guillemot, operated by the Commissioners of Irish Lights, had given warning of a U-boat. In consequence, on 28 March 1917, UC-65 surfaced, ordered the crew into its lifeboat and sank the Guillemot. Against that background, the sinking of Irish Oak became a hotly-debated issue.

The Irish government's stance was that Irish Oak had not warned the Allied convoy of a U-boat presence, as stated by Éamon de Valera in the Dáil and by Irish Shipping Limited. De Valera went on to say that it was "no business of Irish ships to give any information to anyone".

A rumour to the contrary was picked up by the Irish Labour Party. James Everett asked, "Was information given to the British convoy that a submarine was sighted the night before?" Discussion in the Dáil during the runnup to the general election focused on the possibility that a warning had been transmitted, and demands were made to know the nationality of the captain, a British subject:

- Bill Norton: "Would the Taoiseach state the nationality of the master of the ship?"
- Éamon de Valera: "I do not know it."
- James Hickey: "I think the Taoiseach should take a deep interest in finding out the nationality of the captains of our ships."
- William Davin: "Is the Taoiseach aware that a recommendation was submitted that Irish nationals should get preference for these ships?"

Norton, Hickey and Davin were Labour Party members.

Luke Duffy, secretary of the Labour Party, said that the "government was guilty of duplicity and near belligerency behind a facade of neutrality. They had placed foreign nationals on the bridge of Irish ships...". The party issued an advertisement condemning the "criminal conduct of the Fianna Fáil Government in sending brave men to their doom on the Irish Oak".

Responding to allegations that Irish Oak had acted in such a way as to endanger her neutral status, Irish Shipping Limited stated:

"...whether... any information had been conveyed to a British convoy that a submarine had been sighted. The company states in the most explicit manner that there is no foundation whatever for the suggestion contained in the question. No such message was sent.

Seán MacEntee, of the Fianna Fáil, placed a counter-advertisement in The Irish Times, "Licence to Sink", which stated that the Labour Party sought to justify the sinking of the Irish Oak: "But for these ships many of our people might have been hungry, would have been idle.... If our people were hungry and idle they would be more ready to listen to their pernicious doctrines".

After the election, William Davin complained of "the unfounded allegations and the slanderous and libellous statements made against members of this {sic Labour} Party... had the audacity to charge members of this Party, during the recent election campaign, with having condoned the sinking of the Irish Oak. Could anything be more scandalous, or more untrue?"

Although Labour increased its representation, and de Valera's Fianna Fáil party lost seats in the 1943 Irish general election, he remained in power with the support of the Farmers' Party.

=== United States ===
The submarine that had sunk Irish Oak was unknown at the time, only that it was unlikely to have been U-650. Irish Shipping Limited was negotiating a lease of the SS Wolverine from the United States. The US State Department intervened to ask why Ireland had not protested to Germany for the sinking.

The Irish replied that they protested other sinkings when the attacker was known. They protested the attacks on the colliers Glencullen and Glencree. They referred to the attack on the MV Kerlogue by two unidentified aircraft, initially denied by the British but admitted by them when shell fragments of British manufacture were found.

No further American ships were leased or sold to Ireland.

=== German ===
After the war, it was finally revealed that U-607 had sunk Irish Oak. This action and U-607's report were not well received. Captain, Oberleutnant zur See Wolf Jeschonnek, claimed that Irish Oak was a Q-ship with false Irish markings and was sailing without lights:

"The Second Lieutenant excused the sinking by saying that "IRISH OAK" was obviously a "Q" ship. He alleged that she was sailing at night without lights, zigzagging, and travelling at fourteen knots, although she appeared capable of barely half that speed."

The flag officer of the U-boat said that the incident should not have happened but could be attributed to an understandable mistake by an eager captain: "The precise observance of Irish neutrality and of all Flag Officer U-boats' strict orders in this connection is the duty of all U-boat captains and is in the most immediate and pressing interests of the German Reich".

U-607 was sunk in convoy with two other U-boats in the Bay of Biscay on 13 July 1943 by a Sunderland flying boat of 228 Squadron Royal Air Force, assisted by a Halifax of 58 Squadron. Oberleutnant Jeschonnek and six of his crew were taken prisoner, and the rest perished.

Nine days after the sinking of Irish Oak, on 24 May 1943, Admiral Karl Dönitz ordered a U-boat withdrawal from the Atlantic. Of the Gernans' operational fleet, 41 U-boats, or 25% of them, had been lost in Black May, against a total of 50 Allied merchant ships destroyed. The Battle of the Atlantic was over.

== Crew ==
All of the crew of the Irish Oak when she was sunk on 15 May 1943 were rescued.

== Official Numbers, Code Letters and Call Signs ==
Official Numbers, a forerunner to IMO Numbers, were:

- West Neris - United States Official Number 219439.
- Irish Oak - United Kingdom Official Number 189859.

Code Letters:

- West Neris - LVFP until 1933.

Call signs, the replacement of code letters from 1934: KOTK from 1934.

- Irish Oak - EINY.

== Other ships named Irish Oak ==
In 1949, Irish Shipping Limited acquired a new Irish Oak (official number 174596). Built for ISL by J. Readhead and Sons Ltd., South Shields, William Norton complained that she was to be built in Britain. She would be immortalised in Frank McCourt's book "'Tis". In 1967, she was sold to Proverde Shipping of Greece and renamed Vegas. In 1979, en route from Piraeus to Vietnam, she ran aground near Jeddah and was re-floated but sold for breaking up.

In 1973, Irish Shipping Limited acquired another Irish Oak, a bulk carrier motor ship with a diesel engine. Irish Oak, 16,704 GRT, 25,649 DWT, which was in service with Irish Shipping until 1982.

== See also ==
- Irish neutrality (external issues)
- The Emergency (internal issues)
- Irish neutrality during World War II
- Irish Mercantile Marine during World War II
- Irish Shipping

== References and sources ==
Notes

Sources

- Coogan, Tim Pat (2003). Ireland in the Twentieth Century. London: Hutchinson. ISBN 0-09-179427-7.
- Dwyer, T Ryle (1977). Irish neutrality and the USA, 1939-47. Gill and Macmillan. ISBN 978-0-87471-994-9.
- Fisk, Robert (1983). In Time of War. London: André Deutsch. ISBN 0-233-97514-4.
- Forde, Frank (2000) [1981]. The Long Watch. Dublin: New Island Books. ISBN 1-902602-42-0.
- Gray, Tony (1997). The Lost Years. London: Little, Brown & Co. ISBN 0-316-88189-9.
- John Higgins, ed. (Spring–Summer 1980). "War Time Fleet: No. 8 "Irish Oak"". Signal. 17 (3). Dublin: Irish Shipping Ltd.
- Kennedy, Michael (2008). Guarding Neutral Ireland. Dublin: Four Courts Press. ISBN 978-1-84682-097-7.
- Share, Brendan (1978). The Emergency - Neutral Ireland 1939-45. Dublin: Gill and Macmillan. ISBN 071710916X.
- Spong, Harry (1982). Irish Shipping Limited. World Ship Society. ISBN 0-905617-20-7.
- Wills, Clair (2007). That Neutral Island. London: Faber and Faber. ISBN 978-0-571-22105-9.
