= Stanisław Grodzicki =

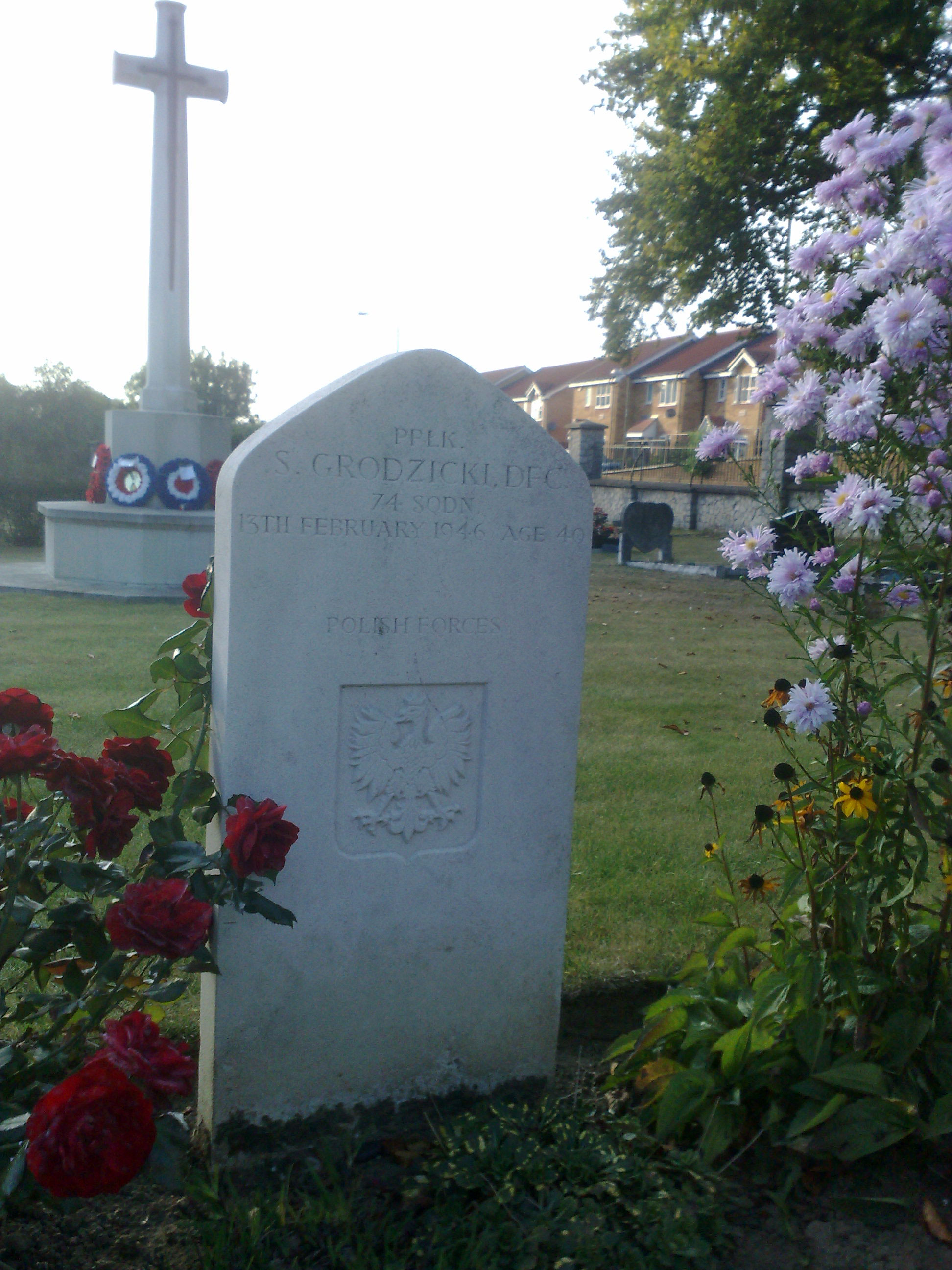
- Stanisław Grodzicki's grave in Star Lane Cemetery, St Mary Cray, Kent
- Born: 1912; Ostrołęka
- Died: 1946 (aged 33–34); Near Orpington
- Burial place: Star Lane Cemetery, St Mary Cray
- Military career
- Allegiance: Poland
- Branch: Polish Air Force
- Rank: Lieutenant colonel
- Unit: No. 307 Polish Night Fighter Squadron
- Awards: Distinguished Flying Cross

Stanisław Grodzicki (1912 in Ostrołęka – 1946 near Orpington) was a Polish fighter pilot and a lieutenant colonel (Podpułkownik) of the Polish Air Force during World War II. He fought during The Blitz in 1941 as a night fighter pilot with No. 307 Polish Fighter Squadron, flying the Boulton Paul Defiant. From November 1940 to June 1941 he was also the commanding officer of the unit. He was awarded the Distinguished Flying Cross.

In 1946, he was killed in an air crash when the Dakota of 435 Squadron RCAF, in which he was a passenger crashed during a bad weather landing approach to Croydon Airport.

He is buried in Star Lane Cemetery, in St Mary Cray, Kent.
