= Finner Camp =

Military base in northwestern Ireland

- Campa Fionnabhair
- Ballyshannon, Ireland
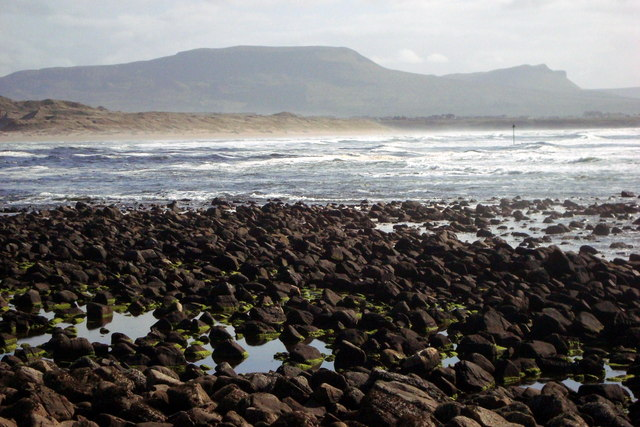
- Finner Camp (in the distance)

Site information
- Type: Barracks
- Operator: (Republic of Ireland) Irish Army

Location
- Location within Ireland
- Coordinates: 54.49450°N 8.23763°W

Site history
- Built: 1888
- Built for: War Office
- In use: 1888 – present

Garrison information
- Occupants: 28th Infantry Battalion, Irish Army.

Finner Camp (Irish: Campa Fionnabhair) is a military installation near Ballyshannon in Ireland.

== History ==
The barracks, which were built on a site known for its megalithic tombs, were completed in 1890. Following the Anglo-Irish Treaty the barracks were handed over to the forces of the Irish Free State in 1922. In the Second World War, it was close to the Donegal Corridor. In August 1969 there was false speculation in the media that Taoiseach Jack Lynch would use the barracks to launch an invasion of Northern Ireland with the aim of protecting the Catholic community there. The barracks are now the home of 28th Infantry Battalion, Irish Army.

== See also ==
- List of Irish military installations
