= Irish neutrality during World War II =

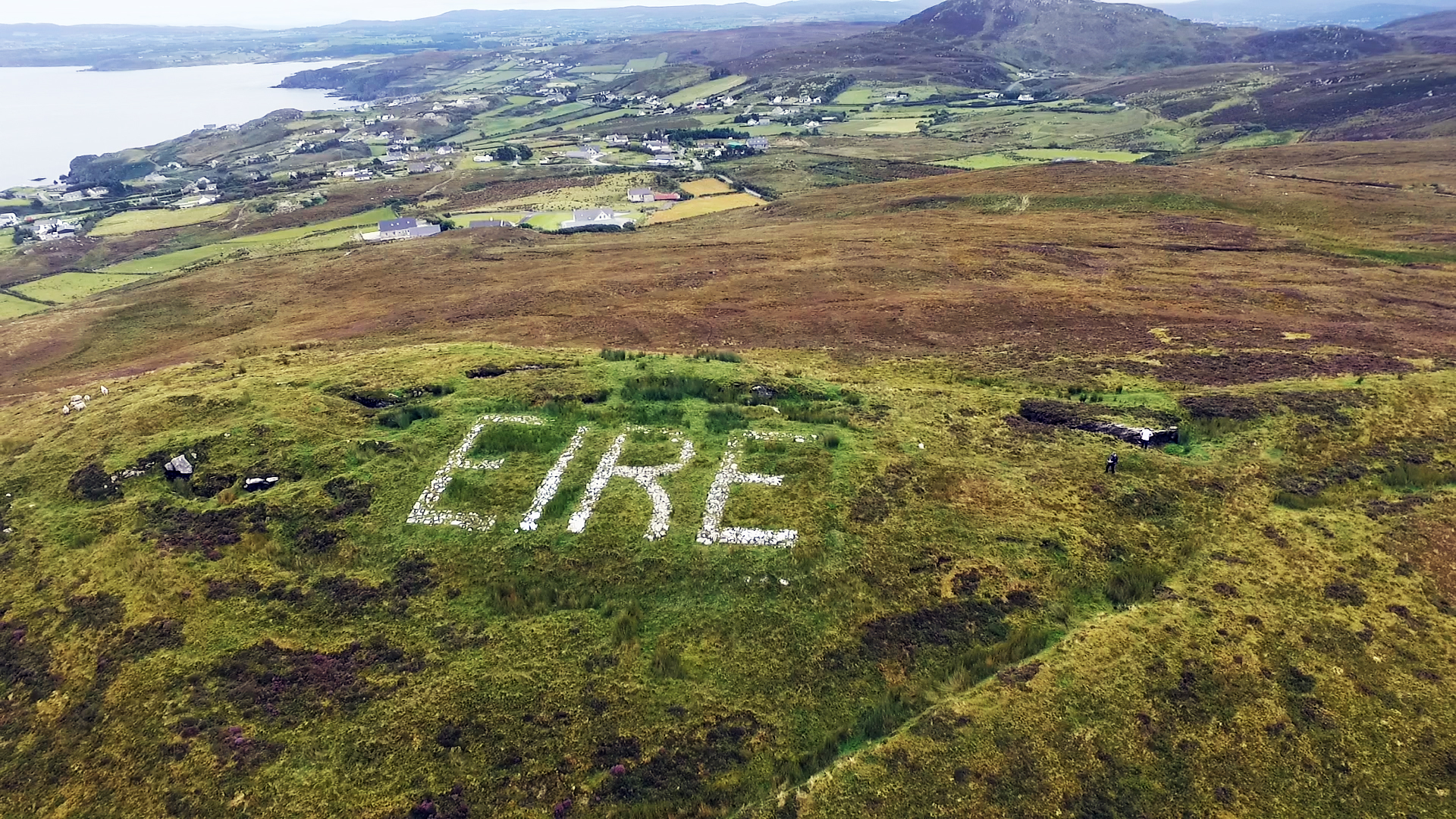
Markings to alert aircraft to neutral Ireland ("Éire" English: "Ireland") during WWII on Glengad Head, County Donegal (pictured 2015)

The policy of neutrality was adopted by Ireland's Oireachtas at the instigation of Taoiseach Éamon de Valera upon the outbreak of World War II in Europe. It was maintained throughout the conflict, in spite of several German air raids by aircraft that missed their intended British targets, and attacks on Ireland's shipping fleet by Allies and Axis alike. Possibilities of both German and British invasions were discussed in Dáil Éireann. Both eventualities were prepared for, although the most detailed preparations were done with the Allies under Plan W. De Valera's ruling party, Fianna Fáil, supported his neutral policy for the duration of the war.

This period is known in Ireland as the Emergency, owing the title to the wording of the constitutional article employed to suspend normal governance of the country.

Pursuing a policy of neutrality required maintaining a balance between the strict observance of non-alignment and the taking of practical steps to repel or discourage an invasion from either of the two warring parties.

Despite the official position of neutrality, there were many unpublicised contraventions of this, such as permitting the use of the Donegal Corridor by Allied military aircraft, and extensive co-operation between Allied and Irish intelligence. The Irish supplied the Allies with detailed weather reports for the Atlantic Ocean, including a weather report from the lighthouse at Blacksod Bay, County Mayo, which prompted the decision to go ahead with the Normandy landings.

== Prewar relationship with Britain ==
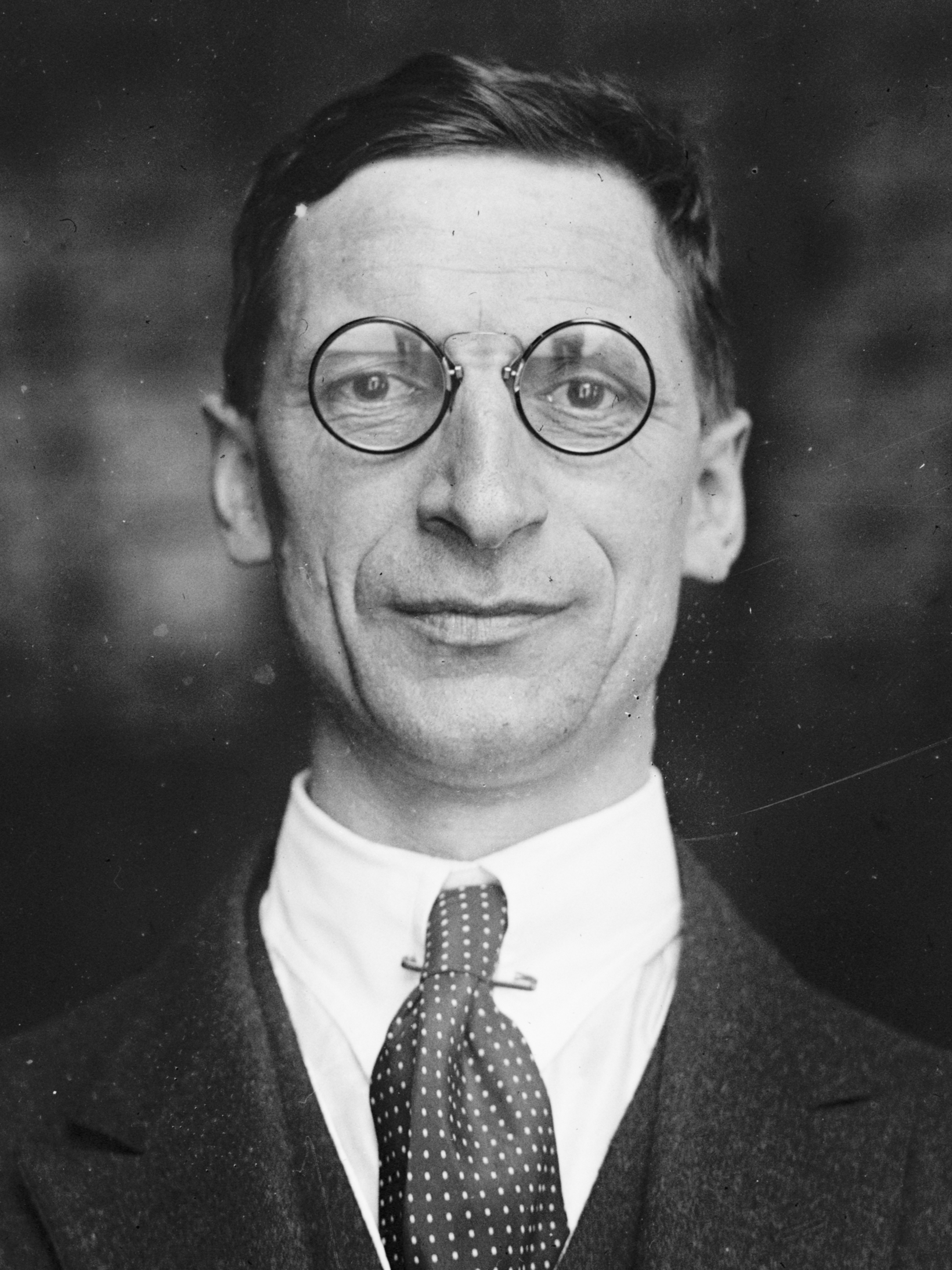
Éamon de Valera, leader of Ireland between 1932 and 1948

Ireland was, in 1939, nominally a Dominion of the British Empire and a member of the Commonwealth. The nation had gained de facto independence from Britain after the Irish War of Independence, and the Anglo-Irish Treaty of 1921 declared Ireland to be a "sovereign, independent, democratic state". A new constitution was adopted by a plebiscite in 1937. The Statute of Westminster 1931 meant that, unlike in World War I, Britain's entry into the war no longer automatically included its dominions. Thus, in 1939, the Irish Free State had the option of remaining neutral. Relations between Ireland and Britain had been strained for many years; until 1938, for example, the two states had engaged in the Anglo-Irish Trade War.

Nevertheless, Ireland did not sever its vestigial connection with the Crown, and it was not until The Republic of Ireland Act 1948 that the final nominal link was severed. No representatives of the new state attended Commonwealth conferences or participated in its affairs, but Ireland remained a legal member until the British Ireland Act 1949, which accepted the declaration of a Republic and formally terminated its membership in the Commonwealth.

Alongside George VI's few remaining powers, the 1937 Constitution had provided that the holder of the new office of President of Ireland was in "Supreme Command" of the Defence Forces.

== Internal affairs ==
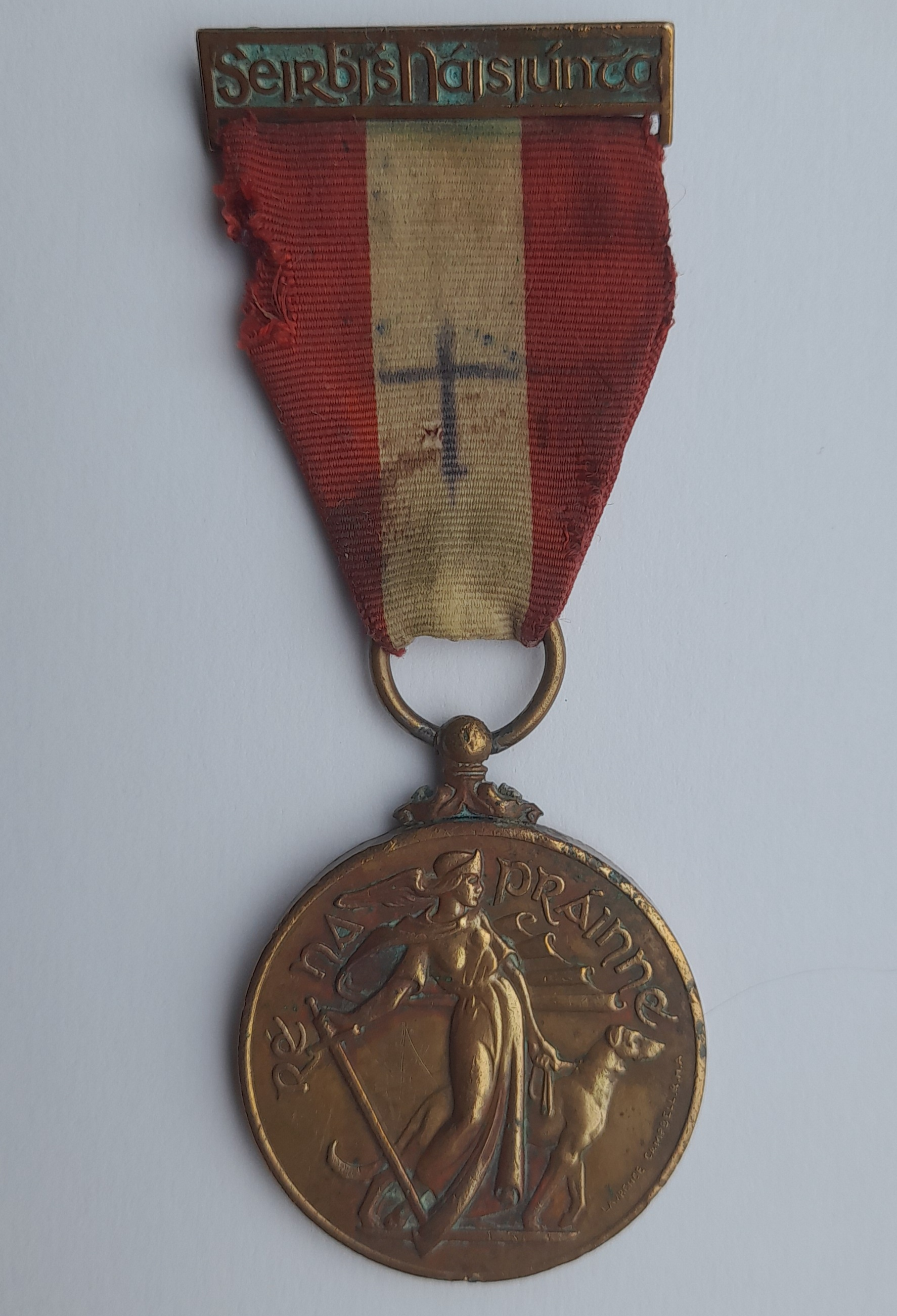
Emergency Service Medal

Irish neutrality was supported by the population of Ireland. Irish citizens could serve in the British armed forces. At least 50,000 fought in the British Army. Others served in the Merchant Navy and Royal Air Force, some rising up the ranks rapidly, such as the youngest wing commander fighter ace in the RAF's history, Brendan Finucane.

A total of 4,983 members of the Defence Forces deserted to fight with the British and Allied armed forces. After the war, they faced discrimination, lost their rights to pensions, and were barred from holding government jobs. They were finally formally pardoned by the Irish Government in 2013.

Travel passes and identity cards were also issued to 245,000 people to enable them to travel to Britain to work. Elements of the Irish Republican movement sided with the Third Reich at the onset of the war with the United Kingdom in 1939, believing that a German victory might bring about a United Ireland.

In response to accusations that the state had failed to take up the moral fight against Nazism, the Secretary of the Department of External Affairs, Joe Walshe, said in 1941 that:

… small nations like Ireland do not and cannot assume a role as defenders of just causes except [their] own. ... Existence of our own people comes before all other considerations … no government has the right to court certain destruction for its people; they have to take the only chance of survival and stay out.

On 1 September 1939, in response to the German invasion of Poland, a hastily convened Dáil declared an immediate state of emergency. The day's debate culminated in the Emergency Powers Act, which came into effect one day later, on 3 September. It was modelled extensively on the British draft worked out during the Sudeten crisis a year before. In some respects, the Irish Act was regarded as more drastic. The key provisions were as follows:

The government may, whenever and so often as they think fit, make by order (in this act referred to as an emergency order), such provisions as are, in the opinion of the government, necessary or expedient for securing the public safety, or the preservation of the state, or for the maintenance of public order, or the provision and control of supplies and services to the life of the community.

With such sweeping executive powers, de Valera's cabinet set out to tackle any problems that might arise and curb any inconsistencies with the nation's policy of neutrality. Censorship of radio newscasts meant newsreaders were confined to reading, without comment, the dispatches of each side, while weather forecasts were halted to preclude the inadvertent assistance of planes or ships involved in the war. Public expressions of opinion appearing to favour one side or the other were usually repressed. The word "war" itself was avoided, with the Government referring to the situation in Europe from 1939 to 1945 as "The Emergency".

However, on the British declaration of war, the teenage George Cole watched as an effigy of Neville Chamberlain was publicly burnt in Dublin without any interference by the police. Cole sensed that there was:

... tremendous antipathy among the Irish towards the British at the time. ... to say it was frightening would be an understatement.

Social and economic conditions in the state at this time were harsh. Wages stagnated, but prices rose. There were serious shortages of fuel and some foodstuffs. Meanwhile, cross-border smuggling and the black market underwent something of a boom.

President Douglas Hyde was a member of the Church of Ireland, most of whose members were ex-unionists and pro-British. When he was invited to a 1943 wedding to be attended by many of the former Protestant Ascendancy, his secretary received assurances from the bride that there would be no "pro-belligerent demonstration either by toasting the King of England and/or the singing of the British National Anthem".

=== Prelude to war ===
The Irish government had good reason to be concerned, lest the war in Europe re-open the wounds of the Civil War. There were pro- and anti-fascist movements in Ireland, and the IRA continued to pursue its own agenda.

Former Old IRA commander and founder of the Fine Gael Party General Eoin O'Duffy became a leader of the paramilitary Army Comrades Association organisation in 1932–1933. In recognition of his consistent support for Ireland's Jews, Éamon de Valera, Ireland's Taoiseach during the war, has a forest in Israel named in his honour. In this context, it is relevant to note that two Irish contingents fought in the 1937 Spanish Civil War – but on opposing sides. O'Duffy's Irish Brigade fought with the (Fascist) Nationalists, and the Irish contingent of the International Brigades fought with the Republicans, though neither had government support.

In the six months prior to the onset of war, there had been an escalation of Irish Republican Army violence and a bombing campaign in Britain under the new leadership of Seán Russell. De Valera, who had tolerated the IRA as recently as 1936, responded with the Offences against the State Act, 1939. Upon the outbreak of the main conflict in September, subversive activity was regarded as endangering the security of the state. There were fears that the United Kingdom, eager to secure Irish ports for their air and naval forces, might use the attacks as a pretext for an invasion of Ireland and a forcible seizure of the assets in question. Furthermore, the possibility that the IRA (in line with the Irish republican tradition of courting allies in Europe) might link up with German agents, thereby compromising Irish non-involvement, was considered.

Russell, in May 1940, travelled to Berlin in an effort to obtain arms and support for the IRA. He received training in German ordnance, but died on a submarine while returning to Ireland as part of Operation Dove. A small number of inadequately prepared German agents were sent to Ireland, but those who did arrive were quickly picked up by the Directorate of Military Intelligence (G2). Active republicans were interned at the Curragh or given prison sentences: six men were hanged under newly legislated acts of treason, and three more died on hunger strike. The Germans also later came to realise they had overestimated the abilities of the IRA. By 1943, the IRA had all but ceased to exist. In Ireland, neutrality was popular, despite rationing and economic pressure.

=== Ports and trade ===
Ireland was isolated at the outbreak of the war. Shipping had been neglected since the Irish independence. Foreign ships, on which Ireland had hitherto depended, were less available; and neutral American ships refused to enter the "war zone". There were 56 Irish ships when the war started; and 15 more were purchased or leased during the conflict; 20 were lost. In his Saint Patrick's Day address in 1940, Taoiseach Éamon de Valera, lamented:

"No country had ever been more effectively blockaded because of the activities of belligerents and our lack of ships, most of which had been sunk, which virtually cut all links with our normal sources of supply."

The diminutive Irish Mercantile Marine continued essential overseas trading. This period was referred to as "The Long Watch" by Irish mariners. They sailed unarmed and usually alone, flying the Irish tricolour. They identified themselves as neutrals with bright lights and by painting the tricolour and EIRE in large letters on their sides and decks, despite this, twenty percent of seamen were killed in the war. Allied convoys often could not stop to pick up survivors. Irish mariners would rescue seafarers from both sides, but they were attacked by both, predominantly by the Axis powers. With the work of the seaman, the imports reached their destination and exports, mainly food supplies for Great Britain, were delivered. 521 lives were saved.

In addition, some British ships were repaired in Irish shipyards.

Despite being frequently encountered as rumours, no U-boats ever used Ireland as a refuelling base. The origins of this claim likely originates with the 1939 dumping of 28 rescued Greek sailors by German submarine U-35 onto the Irish coast, after the U-boat commander Werner Lott sank their Greek cargo freighter, which was bound for Britain with metal ore. This U-boat incident was featured on the cover of the popular U.S. Life magazine, on 16 October 1939. As in the days preceding, news of the dumping was widely published, the magazine and the locals who spotted the unloading of the captured Greeks, noting that the U-boat had conducted the action and re-submerged before coastal defence aircraft could be directed onto the trespassing vessel.

== External affairs ==
=== Policy ===
Early years of World War II in Europe (1939-1941). Note the position of Ireland with respect to the United Kingdom and Nazi Germany.

For de Valera, the purpose of a neutral stance was to maintain Irish independence. Nonetheless, he had no sympathy for the Axis. While the revolutionaries of the Irish War of Independence sought the support of the Central Powers, they realized that, in the long term, Irish national security depended on Great Britain and Ireland being, if not allies, at least not enemies. As early as 1920, de Valera noted that:

An independent Ireland would see its own independence in jeopardy the moment it saw the independence of Britain seriously threatened. Mutual self-interest would make the people of these two islands, if both independent, the closest of allies in a moment of real national danger to either.

This statement reflected a point de Valera had made as early as 1918 (when writing to President of the United States Woodrow Wilson, seeking that the United States formally recognise the Irish Republic as an independent state):

Ireland is quite ready by treaty to ensure England's safety against the danger of foreign powers seeking to use Ireland as a basis of attack against her.

After the Italian conquest of Abyssinia in 1936, de Valera said at the League of Nations:

peace is dependent upon the will of the great States. All the small States can do, if the statesmen of the greater States fail in their duty, is resolutely to determine that they will not become the tools of any great Power and that they will resist with whatever strength they may possess every attempt to force them into a war against their will.

Months before the outbreak of war, de Valera gave a statement to the Associated Press which appeared in newspapers on 20 February 1939:

The desire of the Irish people and the desire of the Irish Government is to keep our nation out of war. The aim of Government policy is to maintain and to preserve our neutrality in the event of war. The best way and the only way to secure our aim is to put ourselves in the best position possible to defend ourselves so that no one can hope to attack us or violate our territory with impunity. We know, of course, that should attack come from a power other than Great Britain, Great Britain in her own interest must help us to repel it.

=== Offer to end the partition of Ireland in 1940 ===
At a series of meetings in 17–26 June 1940, during and after the Battle of France, British envoy Malcolm MacDonald brought a proposal to end the partition of Ireland and offered a solemn undertaking to accept "the principle of a United Ireland" if the independent Irish state would abandon its neutrality and immediately join the war against Germany and Italy. However, the reality of unity would have to be agreed by the "representatives of the government of Éire and the government of Northern Ireland", each of which distrusted the other intensely. De Valera therefore rejected the amended proposals on 4 July, worried that there was "no guarantee that in the end we would have a united Ireland" and that it "would commit us definitely to an immediate abandonment of our neutrality". The offer and his rejection remained secret until a biography was published in 1970. Prime Minister Churchill proposed that a Council for the Defence of all Ireland should be formed out of which "the unity of the island would probably, in some form or other emerge after the war." The Irish Prime Minister interpreted that statement as an offer to end of partition in return for his nation's entry into the war. De Valera was said to have stated: "We cannot believe you." Later stating, "If we were foolish enough to accept that invitation ... we would be cheated in the end." De Valera had campaigned against partition and the 1937 Constitution drafted by him had an irredentist clause describing the State as the "whole island of Ireland". After the war he again called repeatedly for the ending of partition.

=== Mixed effects ===
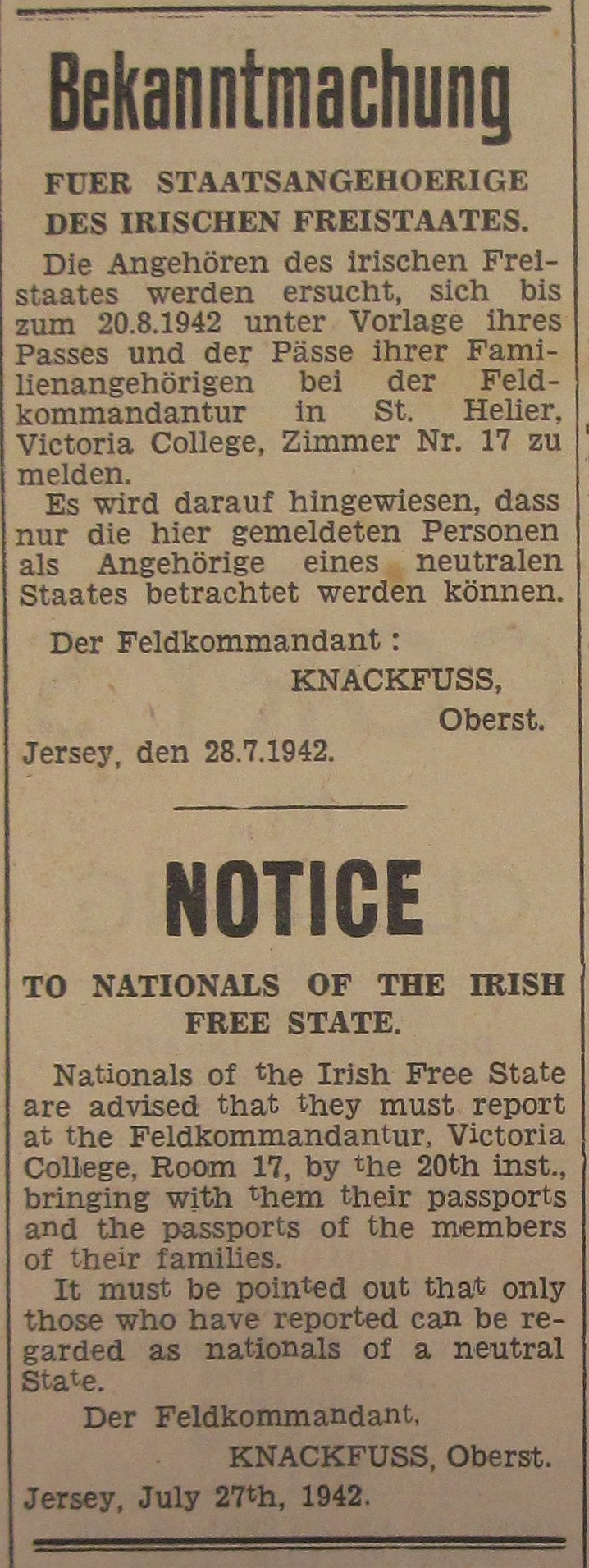
Notice from German-occupied Jersey inviting Irish citizens to register as "nationals of a neutral state."

In April 1941, the question of Ireland's entry into the war was again raised when the Australian Prime Minister Robert Menzies paid a visit to Belfast and Dublin for private discussions with De Valera and John M. Andrews, the Prime Minister of Northern Ireland. Subsequently, Menzies reported to Churchill that the complexity of the questions of Irish unity and sovereignty meant that there was little possibility of Ireland's abandoning its policy of neutrality.

Without the Irish treaty ports (which the United Kingdom had released a year prior to the war), an independent Ireland posed a serious disadvantage to the military capability and safety of British fighting and trade, risking the possibility of invasion if that disadvantage ever proved too great. If Irish sovereignty was to be maintained, then neutrality would have to be steered consciously to the benefit of British interests, as these were its own: at once to aid the British war effort but also to forestall invasion by Britain to regain the treaty ports. Ireland, like other neutrals, was "...neutral for the power that potentially threatened them most." During the war, and accusing de Valera as a "Nazi sympathiser", the Prime Minister of Northern Ireland, Lord Craigavon, urged Churchill to use Scottish and Welsh troops to overrun "southern Ireland" before installing a Governor-General for the whole island at Dublin, but this proposal was rejected by London. Nevertheless, Churchill directed Field Marshal Sir Bernard Montgomery to prepare plans to seize Cork and Queenstown (Cobh) so their harbours could be used as naval bases. Better submarine-detecting technology, as well as military bases in Iceland, meant that the Irish ports were no longer as vital for the Allies as they had been during World War I.

In this regard, Viscount Cranborne acknowledged at the war's end that the Irish Government had "been willing to accord us any facilities which would not be regarded as overtly prejudicing their attitude to neutrality", collaborating with the British war cabinet. (See below for complete text.) The pattern of co-operation between British and Irish agencies began upon the onset of war when de Valera permitted the use of specified Irish airspace mainly for patrolling coastal points. The use of the "Donegal Corridor", the narrow strip of Irish territory between County Fermanagh and the sea, was significant. By the autumn of 1941, use of the corridor was a daily routine. While de Valera rejected British appeals to use Irish ports and harbour facilities directly, de Valera was, according to M.E. Collins, "more friendly than strict neutrality should have allowed." The co-operation that emerged allowed for meetings to take place to consider events after German troops had overrun neutral Denmark, Norway, the Netherlands, Luxembourg and Belgium. Three days after the fall of France, Irish and British defence officials met to discuss how British troops could, strictly at de Valera's invitation, occupy Ireland upon the event of a German landing there to expel foreign troops attempting to use her as a back door to later invade Britain (Plan "W"). The meetings continued, as Cranborne described, throughout the war, facilitating further dialogue.

Before the war began, de Valera had held a meeting with career diplomat Eduard Hempel, the German Minister in Ireland since 1938. The meetings discussed Ireland's close trade links with the United Kingdom and the ease with which Britain could invade Ireland if its interests were threatened. He, in turn, communicated to Berlin that such was the case that it "rendered it inevitable for the Irish government to show a certain consideration for Britain" and urged war officials to avoid any action that would legitimise a British invasion of Ireland. In mid-June 1940, Secretary of External Affairs Joe Walshe expressed his "great admiration for the German achievements." Hempel, for his part, wrote to Germany of "the great and decisive importance, even to Ireland, of the changed situation in world affairs and of the obvious weakness of the democracies." Hempel might well have known better of Irish intentions, having earlier described a native custom "to say agreeable things without meaning everything that is said."

Other examples of Irish attitudes towards Nazi Germany found expression in mid-1940 in de Valera's Chargé d'Affaires in Berlin, William Warnock, 'whose "unquestionable" hostility to Britain could easily be interpreted as sympathetic for National Socialism.' Academic J.J. Lee questioned just how much of Warnock's zeal towards Hitler's Reichstag speech on 19 July was genuine enthusiasm for the 'international justice' that could be expected after Germany's victory, as opposed to an adherence to the instructions of Dublin to please oneself to the potential victors. Three years later, by 1944, the orientation of the war and of Irish relations to Germany had turned about-face, with the likelihood of a German victory now remote. In that climate, the Irish Government, once so ready to "say agreeable things", Hempel remarked, had become "unhelpful and evasive".

The United States Ambassador to Ireland, David Gray, stated that he once asked de Valera what he would do if German paratroopers "liberated Derry". According to Gray, de Valera was silent for a time and then replied, "I don't know".

=== Condolences on Hitler's death ===
Ireland maintained a public stance of neutrality to the end by refusing to close the German and Japanese Legations. The Taoiseach Éamon de Valera personally visited Ambassador Hempel at his home in Dún Laoghaire on 2 May 1945 to express official condolences on the death of German dictator Adolf Hitler, following the usual protocol on the death of a Head of State of a state with a legation in Ireland. President Hyde visited Hempel separately on 3 May. Irish envoys in other nations did likewise, but no other Western European democracies followed Ireland's example. The visits caused a storm of protest in the United States.

De Valera denounced reports of Bergen-Belsen concentration camp as "anti-national propaganda"; according to Paul Bew, this was not out of disbelief but rather because the Holocaust undermined the assumptions underlying Irish neutrality: moral equivalence between the Allies and the Axis, and the idea that the Irish were the most persecuted people in Europe.

=== Position on Jewish refugees ===
Ireland's position on Jewish refugees fleeing Europe was one of scepticism. Irish authorities during the war generally gave two justifications for turning away prospective immigrants: that they would overcrowd the nation and take Irish jobs, and that a substantial increase in the Jewish population might give rise to an antisemitic problem. There was some domestic anti-Jewish sentiment during World War II, most notably expressed in a notorious speech to the Dáil in 1943, when newly elected independent TD Oliver J. Flanagan advocated "routing the Jews out of the country".

There was some official indifference from the political establishment to the Jewish victims of the Holocaust during and after the war. This indifference would later be described by Minister for Justice, Equality and Law Reform Michael McDowell as being "antipathetic, hostile and unfeeling". Mervyn O'Driscoll of University College Cork reported on the unofficial and official barriers that prevented Jews from finding refuge in Ireland:

Although overt anti-Semitism was not typical, the Southern Irish were indifferent to the Nazi persecution of the Jews and those fleeing the [T]hird Reich. … A successful applicant in 1938 was typically wealthy, middle-aged or elderly, single from Austria, Roman Catholic and desiring to retire in peace to Ireland and not engage in employment. Only a few Viennese bankers and industrialists met the strict criterion of being Catholic, although possibly of Jewish descent, capable of supporting themselves comfortably without involvement in the economic life of the country.

== Media ==
Irish neutrality was used by German propaganda to film an anti-British themed movie in 1941 named My Life for Ireland, which tells the story of an Irish nationalist family in their struggle against the British.

== Victory in Europe Day ==
In his speech celebrating the Allied victory in Europe (13 May 1945) Winston Churchill remarked that he had demonstrated restraint towards Ireland because

"we never laid a violent hand upon them, which at times would have been quite easy and quite natural."

Britain had occupied neutral Iceland in May 1940. In a response a few days later, de Valera acknowledged that Churchill did not add "another horrid chapter to the already bloodstained record" of British–Irish relations, but asked:

… could he not find in his heart the generosity to acknowledge that there is a small nation that stood alone, not for one year or two, but for several hundred years against aggression … a small nation that could never be got to accept defeat and has never surrendered her soul?

In addition, he put the following, that

I would like to put a hypothetical question—it is a question I have put to many Englishmen since the last war. Suppose Germany had won the war, had invaded and occupied England, and that after a long lapse of time and many bitter struggles, she was finally brought to acquiesce in admitting England's right to freedom, and let England go, but not the whole of England, all but, let us say, the six southern counties.

These six southern counties, those, let us suppose, commanding the entrance to the narrow seas, Germany had singled out and insisted on holding herself with a view to weakening England as a whole, and maintaining the securing of her own communications through the Straits of Dover.

Let us suppose further, that after all this had happened, Germany was engaged in a great war in which she could show that she was on the side of freedom of a number of small nations, would Mr. Churchill as an Englishman who believed that his own nation had as good a right to freedom as any other, not freedom for a part merely, but freedom for the whole-would he, whilst Germany still maintained the partition of his country and occupied six counties of it, would he lead this partitioned England to join with Germany in a crusade? I do not think Mr. Churchill would.

Would he think the people of partitioned England an object of shame if they stood neutral in such circumstances? I do not think Mr. Churchill would.

The implications on Victory in Europe Day and after, of having not been involved in the war and having suffered the devastation that defined the course of Europe afterwards, are the subject of historical debate. The devastation shared by most of Europe, and Ireland's avoidance of it, was described by F. S. L. Lyons as:

The tensions – and the liberations – of war, the shared experience, the comradeship in suffering, the new thinking about the future, all these things had passed her by. It was as if an entire people had been condemned to live in Plato's cave, with their backs to the fire of life and deriving their only knowledge of what went on outside from the flickering shadows thrown on the wall before their eyes by the men and women who passed to and fro behind them. When after six years they emerged, from the cave into the light of day, it was a new and vastly different world.

In response to that, Ronan Fanning wrote: "One might question ... the liberating value of war for a people who has so recently emerged from revolution followed by a civil war and in whose midst the IRA still propounded the creed of violence".

== The Cranborne Report ==
On 21 February 1945 Viscount Cranborne, the British Secretary of State for Dominion Affairs, presented a memorandum to the British War Cabinet regarding Irish–British collaboration during 1939–1945:

1. They agreed to our use of Lough Foyle for naval and air purposes. The ownership of the Lough is disputed, but the Southern Irish authorities are tacitly not pressing their claim in present conditions and are also ignoring any flying by our aircraft over the Donegal shore of the Lough, which is necessary in certain wind conditions to enable flying boats to take off from the Lough.
2. They have agreed to use by our aircraft based on Lough Erne of a corridor over Southern Irish territory and territorial waters for the purpose of flying out to the Atlantic.
3. They have arranged for the immediate transmission to the United Kingdom Representative's Office in Dublin of reports of submarine activity received from their coast watching service.
4. They arranged for the broadening of reports by their Air Observation Corps of aircraft sighted over or approaching Southern Irish territory. (This does not include our aircraft using the corridor referred to in (b) above.)
5. They arranged for the extinction of trade and business lighting in coastal towns where such lighting was alleged to afford a useful landmark for German aircraft.
6. They have continued to supply us with meteorological reports.
7. They have agreed to the use by our ships and aircraft of two wireless direction-finding stations at Malin Head.
8. They have supplied particulars of German crashed aircraft and personnel crashed or washed ashore or arrested on land.
9. They arranged for staff talks on the question of co-operation against a possible German invasion of Southern Ireland, and close contact has since been maintained between the respective military authorities.
10. They continue to intern all German fighting personnel reaching Southern Ireland. On the other hand, though after protracted negotiations, Allied service personnel are now allowed to depart freely, and full assistance is given in recovering damaged aircraft.
11. Recently, in connection with the establishment of prisoner of war camps in Northern Ireland, they have agreed to return or at least intern any German prisoners who may escape from Northern Ireland across the border to Southern Ireland.
12. They have throughout offered no objection to the departure from Southern Ireland of persons wishing to serve in the United Kingdom Forces nor to the journey on leave of such persons to and from Southern Ireland (in plain clothes).
13. They have continued to exchange information with our security authorities regarding all aliens (including Germans) in Southern Ireland.
14. They have (within the last few days) agreed to our establishing a radar station in Southern Ireland for use against the latest form of submarine activity.

== Effect on United Nations membership ==
The neutrality policy led to a considerable delay in Ireland's membership of the United Nations (UN). Ireland's applications for membership were vetoed by the Soviet Union, a permanent member of the Security Council, from 1946 to December 1955.

The original use of the term "United Nations" in 1942–45 always referred to the Allies of World War II. Ireland had applied to join the UN in 1946, following the demise of the League of Nations, whose final Secretary-General was Irish diplomat Seán Lester.

By March 1955, the Minister for External Affairs, Liam Cosgrave, announced that: "Ireland's application for membership of the U.N.O. still stands although it remains blocked by an objection in the Security Council". For reasons of diplomacy, the government would not state the reason for the objection, nor which country had made it. Seán MacBride considered that the UN boycott of Ireland was originally agreed at the 1945 Yalta Conference by Churchill and Stalin. Ireland's acceptance into the UN was announced by John A. Costello on 15 December 1955.

== See also ==
- Caught in a Free State
- Irish Mercantile Marine during World War II
- Irish maritime events during World War II
- Irish neutrality
- List of World War II weapons used in Ireland
- List of aircraft of Ireland in World War II
- Neutral powers during World War II
- British Empire in World War II
