= Donegal Corridor =

Irish airspace transit right given to Britain during WW2

Donegal Corridor Erne Corridor
- Region
- Location in Ireland
- Coordinates: 54°30′05″N 8°12′06″W
- Country: Ireland
- Province: Ulster
- County: County Donegal
- Time zone: UTC+0 (WET)
  - Summer (DST): UTC-1 (IST (WEST))
- Irish Grid Reference: G874616

The Donegal Corridor (Irish: Muinchinn Dúin na nGall) was a narrow strip of Irish airspace linking RAF Castle Archdale on Lough Erne to the international waters of the Atlantic Ocean through which the Irish Government permitted flights by British military aircraft during World War II. This was a contravention of Irish neutrality and was not publicised at the time.

== Background ==
When the Second World War broke out in September 1939, Ireland remained neutral, in accordance with its pre-declared neutrality policy.

The Battle of the Atlantic commenced soon after war was declared. German U-boats attacked Allied shipping convoys in the Atlantic Ocean, where hundreds of ships were sunk and thousands of lives lost, resulting in a very serious situation for the Allied forces. In December 1940, a survey was carried out on Lough Erne with a view to having flying boat bases built there. This was the most westerly point in the United Kingdom from where planes could patrol the Atlantic and offer some protection to the shipping convoys against the dreaded U-boats. Early in 1941, the first flying boats were based on Lough Erne. They were not permitted to fly over the territory of Ireland. This meant that they had first to fly northwards, then change their flight path and go west.

Some limited protection could be given to the convoys coming to the UK from the US and Canada, the same protection could be given by American-based aircraft. Still, there was a gap where the U-boats could create havoc unhindered. This mid-Atlantic area was known as the Black Gap. Ireland came under extreme pressure from the British and even the US, who at this time were themselves neutral, to dispense with its neutrality policy and join with the Allies. A meeting took place in January 1941 between Éamon de Valera and John Maffey, the British representative in Dublin. An agreement was reached whereby the Lough Erne-based flying boats were permitted to fly across a 4-mile (6.4 km) stretch of neutral territory from Belleek in County Fermanagh to Ballyshannon in County Donegal and thereby gain access to the Atlantic Ocean. This agreement was included in The Cranborne Report. To pacify the Germans, these aircraft were supposed to follow a defined route and then only on air/sea rescue missions.

This flight path became known as the Donegal Corridor. The original agreement and rules were soon changed and the flying boats went on missions to the mid-Atlantic, to the west coast of France and to Iceland to protect convoys on those routes. This was a turning point in the Battle of the Atlantic which was the longest battle of the Second World War. Some nine U-boats were confirmed as having been sunk by the Lough Erne Short Sunderland and Catalina flying boats and many others so badly damaged that they had to return to base in France.

== Location ==
Between Lough Melvin in County Leitrim and the River Erne in County Donegal, County Donegal narrows and separates the Northern Irish County Fermanagh from Donegal Bay and the Atlantic. The 7-mile (11 km) long Corridor was between Belleek and the coast beyond Ballyshannon, along the course of the River Erne. The base was at RAF Castle Archdale.

== Use ==
The first official flight along the Corridor was on 21 February 1941 by No. 240 Squadron RAF's Supermarine Stranraer flying boats. Conditions of the concession included that flights should be made at a "good height" and that aircraft should not fly over the military camp at Finner; these conditions appear to have been ignored by both sides.

A notable episode was when a Consolidated Catalina flying boat from No. 209 Squadron RAF based at Lough Erne observed and pinpointed the battleship Bismarck in 1941, a stroke of tactical intelligence that helped lead to the warship's destruction. By the end of the war, 320 men had died in 41 missions by flying boats based at Lough Erne. In 2007, memorial plaques were unveiled in Counties Donegal and Fermanagh.

== See also ==
- The Emergency
- Treaty Ports (Ireland)
