= Sheila Murphy (diplomat) =

- Born: 28 December 1898; 18 Harcourt Street, Dublin
- Died: 15 January 1983 (aged 84); Oak House nursing home, Orwell Road, Rathgar, Dublin

Sheila Murphy (28 December 1898 – 15 January 1983) was an Irish diplomat, being Ireland's highest ranking female diplomat during her career.

== Early life and family ==
Sheila Geraldine Mary Murphy was born at 18 Harcourt Street, Dublin on 28 December 1898. She was the eldest daughter of the five children of physician and surgeon, Dr John Joseph Murphy and Louisa Murphy (née Dickson).

== Career ==
Murphy joined the civil service in Dáil Éireann in 1921 as a compiler of statistics. From February 1921 to January 1922 she was the secretariat of the provisional government in the Dáil publicity department. She became James McNeill's private secretary in 1923 while he was serving as Irish high commissioner in London. In 1926 she left London to become Joseph Walshe's private secretary in the Department of External Affairs. She remained in this position until 1946, also being the archivist of the department from 1936. She left these posts to become the secretary of Ireland's first ambassadorial department to the Holy See.

It has been said that Murphy's role in the history and development of early Irish foreign policy has been overlooked. In her positions in the Department of External Affairs, she handed many highly confidential correspondence and documents, while working closely with Joseph Walshe. Along with Walshe's second in command, Seán Murphy, Murphy was privy to far more need-to-know information than many other department staff, of which she had comprehensive knowledge and was involved in the high level departmental policy making. Her involvement in such documents can be seen by her initials "SGM" on much of the sensitive Department of External Affairs material which is now held in the National Archives in Dublin. Conor Cruise O'Brien confirmed that Murphy was part of "a very small, tightly knit, confidential group of officials" who advised Éamon de Valera.

In 1946 Murphy was given her first diplomatic post when Walshe was appointed ambassador to the Vatican as a second secretary in the political and treaty relations section, going on to be promoted to first secretary in 1948. Along with Walshe, Seán Murphy, and Frank Cremins, Murphy was one of the longest serving members of the department with 24 years of service. Along with the department's librarian and translator, Rosita Austin, they were the only women in senior positions in the department from 1922 to 1946, and Murphy seen as the only female "career diplomat". From 1956 to 1961 she was first secretary in Paris, and was part of the first Irish delegation to a UN general assembly in 1956. She was in charge of the international organisations section of the Department of External Affairs in 1961, holding responsibility for all international organisations bar the UN. In 1962 she was promoted to assistant secretary. By the time of her retirement on 19 February 1964, she was Ireland's highest ranking female diplomat.

== Later life and death ==
Those who worked alongside Murphy and Walshe in the Department of External Affairs believed that Walshe wished to marry Murphy, but that his ill-health prevented this. Murphy died at Oak House nursing home, Orwell Road, Rathgar, Dublin on 15 January 1983. She is buried in Deans Grange Cemetery.
