= Joseph Walshe =

Irish civil servant

Joseph P. Walshe
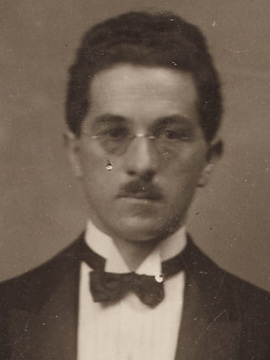
- Walshe in 1922
- Born: 2 October 1886; Killenaule, County Tipperary, Ireland
- Died: 6 February 1956 (aged 69); Cairo, Egypt
- Resting place: Cairo
- Education: University College Dublin
- Occupation: Civil Servant
- Known for: Secretary, Department of Foreign Affairs

Joseph (Joe) Walshe (2 October 1886 – 6 February 1956) was an Irish civil servant and diplomat. As Secretary of the Department of External Affairs of the Irish Free State from 1923 to 1946, he was the department's most senior official.

== Early life and education ==
Walshe was born in the largely agricultural and coal mining region of Killenaule, County Tipperary in 1886. In 1903 he joined the Society of Jesus (Jesuits) as a novice. Two years later he was sent by them to study in the Netherlands with exiled French members of the order. Walshe returned to Ireland where he studied at Mungret College, County Limerick, and began teaching at the prestigious Jesuit-run boarding school of Clongowes Wood. He left the order in 1916 due to illness, before studying for a general law degree at University College Dublin. He went on to obtain a master's degree in French.

== From Irish Republic to Treaty split ==
Having completed his studies, Walshe went on holidays to France where he met with Seán T. Ó Ceallaigh, whom he had known at the University. Ó Ceallaigh had been sent to Paris in 1919 to lobby the international delegates for recognition of the revolutionary Irish Republic at the Paris Peace Conference. While the Irish War of Independence continued, Walshe worked with Ó Ceallaigh and his small team for international recognition of the nascent government of which he was now an employee, and which the British authorities considered illegal. Walshe was formally engaged in Paris from 1 November 1920 until his recall to Dublin on 31 January 1922. His transfer and meteoric promotion were precipitated by the split within the Irish government due to disagreements over the Anglo-Irish Treaty and which soon led to the Irish Civil War. Robert Brennan, who was Under-Secretary for Foreign Affairs prior to the split, and who sided with the anti-treaty faction, recommended to the pro-treaty George Gavan Duffy that Walshe would be a capable replacement for him to organise the Department. Gavan Duffy accepted the recommendation of his erstwhile colleague and Walshe was appointed Acting Secretary of the Department of Foreign Affairs of the Provisional Government.

== Second World War ==
During World War II, he was viewed as being pro-German by outside observers, especially in the United Kingdom. In June 1940, he met with Eduard Hempel, the German Minister to Ireland. According to Hempel's report back to Berlin:

"The conversation, in which Walshe expressed great admiration for the German achievements, went off in a friendly way ... (Walshe) remarked that he hoped that the statement of the Leader in his interview with Weygand respecting his absence of intention to destroy the British Empire, did not mean the abandonment of Ireland."

On 21 June 1940, Walshe sent Éamon de Valera a memo entitled 'Britain's Inevitable Defeat'. He argued that 'Neither time nor gold can beat Germany' and that Britain would swiftly be forced to submit by German bombing.

On 2 May 1945, he and Taoiseach Éamon de Valera visited Hempel at home in Dún Laoghaire to express the Irish Government's official condolences on the suicide of Adolf Hitler. However, Walshe strongly advised De Valera not to make the visit.

He served as Ambassador to the Holy See from 1946 to 1954. He died in Cairo on 6 February 1956.

== Personal life ==
Some who worked in the Department with Walshe believed that he long held the desire to marry his colleague Sheila Murphy, but that his ill health had prevented this.

== Bibliography ==
- Nolan, Aengus : Joseph Walshe: Irish Foreign Policy 1922–1946 : ISBN 978-1-85635-580-3
