= Eduard Hempel =

Nazi Germany diplomat (1887–1972)

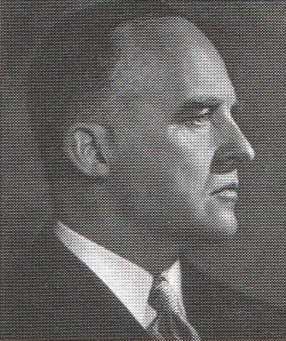
- Hempel, c.1930s
- Born: 6 June 1887; Pirna, Kingdom of Saxony, German Empire
- Died: 12 November 1972 (aged 85); Wildtal, Gundelfingen, Baden-Württemberg, West Germany
- Education: University of Leipzig
- Occupation: Diplomat
- Known for: Representative to Ireland during World War II for Nazi Germany
- Spouse: Eva Hempel
- Children: Liv Hempel, Constantine Hempel

Eduard Hempel (6 June 1887 - 12 November 1972) was a German diplomat. He was the representative of Nazi Germany to Ireland between 1937 and 1945, in the build-up to and during The Emergency in Second World War. When appointed to the post, Hempel was not a Nazi Party member. However, the Nazi regime soon put him under pressure to join the party, which occurred on 1 July 1938.

== Early life ==
Eduard Hempel was the son of a Geheimer Regierungsrat, a high-ranking civil servant. He attended the gymnasium (grammar school) in Bautzen and the Fridericianum in Davos and graduated from high school in Wertheim. He completed a law degree from the University of Leipzig. Following compulsory military service, he joined the judicial service of Kingdom of Saxony but was conscripted at the start of World War I. During the war, he served as a lieutenant on the administrative staff, including in the military administration of occupied Romania.

== Diplomatic career ==
Hempel joined the foreign service of Saxony in 1920, which was absorbed into the German diplomatic service. Hempel was posted to Oslo in 1928. He returned to Berlin to work in the Foreign Office. In 1928 he joined the German People's Party (DVP). On 22 June 1937 he became the diplomatically accredited successor of the late envoy Wilhelm von Kuhlmann in Ireland. Hempel joined the Nazi party on 1 July 1938, as the head of an Embassy that had a very active Nazi organization. When the United States envoy David Gray took over the German embassy and its archives on 10 May 1945 on behalf of the victorious powers, Hempel had already destroyed all significant records, with, according to Gray, the tacit support of the Irish government.

== Later life ==
After his removal as the German head of mission, De Valera granted Hempel and other members of his staff asylum. He resisted requests from the Allies to extradite him, which would have led to a long internment in the Witness Prison of the Palace of Justice, Nuremberg. Hempel was not allowed to work, but the family was able to go on living at the legation, Gortleitragh, in Monkstown, Dublin, and Hempel's wife then supported them by running a confectionery and bakery. Hempel returned to Germany in 1949 and was denazified in Stade in the British occupation zone as "Category V – exonerated", so faced no sanctions.

Hempel was reinstated in the Foreign Service of the Federal Republic of Germany on 31 January 1950, and retired on 18 December 1951. This secured his pension as a retired ambassador.

After Hempel retired, he and his wife lived on a small estate in the Black Forest. Their son Andreas studied medicine at Trinity College, Dublin, and became an ophthalmologist in England. Their son Constantin married the actress Anouska Hempel, and they had two children.

== Assessment ==
The former critic of the Irish Times, Charles Acton was quoted as saying: "Dr Hempel was, I am convinced, an old-fashioned, career civil service diplomat, caught in the terrible dilemma of his times. Loving his country but hating the regime that had taken control of it, he felt he could do more good in the long run and mitigate the harm of the regime by remaining Minister and pursuing a course of utter correctness, than by resigning and thereby risking the Legation being run by a real Nazi."

Earlier, in a letter to the Irish Times on 25 February 2011, Michael Drury, a former diplomat, wrote that: "Official circles in Ireland recognised that Dr Hempel behaved correctly throughout his mission, given the narrow limits of his position. For example, he respected Ireland's neutrality better than the American minister did. If he were regarded as having been 'Hitler's man', I would not have been instructed, as an official of the Irish Embassy in Bonn, to attend his funeral in 1972." Drury's assessment of Hempel was however challenged by several other Irish Times readers, who pointed to evidence of the German minister's pro-Hitler, pro-Nazi and anti-Semitic outlook. In further correspondence on 8 March 2011 he wrote, 'I agree that Dr Hempel ought to have resigned when pressured to join the Nazi party, but not all of us are endowed with heroic virtues. He had no need to use the "classical excuse" that he followed orders: he was not accused of war crimes.'

Hempel's time in Ireland is particularly noted for the incident at the end of his term of office when the Taoiseach, Éamon de Valera and Joe Walshe, Secretary of the Department of External Affairs, paid a visit to his home in Dún Laoghaire on 2 May 1945 to express their official condolences on the death of German dictator Adolf Hitler. Hempel was described as being distraught at the news, wringing his hands in anguish, although after his death his wife, Eva, accounted for the incident by saying that he was suffering from eczema. According to official papers released in 2005, President Hyde also visited Hempel, the following day.

In his eight years in post, Hempel sent thousands of reports to Berlin by telegraph and shortwave radio (the latter until he surrendered his radio transmitter in December 1943 at the insistence of the Department of External Affairs, and under pressure from the United States and United Kingdom). Some historians have stated that Hempel was involved in undermining the 1942 allied raid on Dieppe to failure by reporting Canadian troop movements on the south coast of England, although this charge has been disputed.

In Documents on Irish Foreign Policy 1941-1945, a letter from de Valera is quoted defending his contentious visit to Hempel following the death of Hitler. He wrote, "So long as we retained our diplomatic relations with Germany, to have failed to call upon the German representative would have been an act of unpardonable discourtesy to the German nation and to Dr Hempel," he said in a letter.

In 2011, Hempel's daughter, Liv Hempel, said, "In hindsight, I believe that the reason De Valera called to the house was out of friendship ... He visited because he knew my father, and the condolences were to my father because his position [as envoy to Ireland] was finished. Hitler's death didn't mean a damn thing to my father; he was happy about it – like we are happy about Osama bin Laden."
