= MV Kerlogue =

Irish ship attacked in the Second World War

- MV Kerlogue, passing Dalkey Island, from an oil painting by Kenneth King

History

Ireland
- Name: Kerlogue
- Owner: Wexford Steamship Company
- Port of registry: Wexford
- Builder: Rotterdam
- Launched: 1938
- Completed: February 1938
- Fate: Wrecked off Tromsø in 1960

General characteristics
- Tonnage: 335 GRT
- Length: 142 ft (43 m)
- Deck clearance: 1 ft (0.30 m)
- Crew: 11

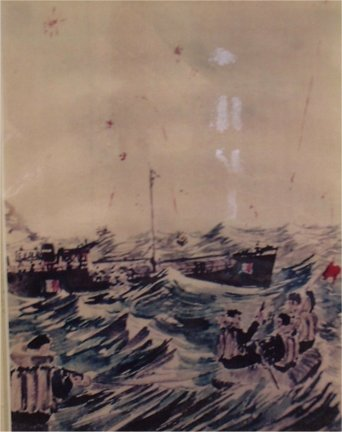
A sketch of the rescue drawn by Hans Helmut Karsch, while interned in the Curragh. National Maritime Museum of Ireland

The MV Kerlogue /ˈkɜːrloʊɡ/ was an Irish ship attacked in World War II that has become the exemplar of neutral Irish ships during the war. The Kerlogue was a very small ship that was attacked by both sides and rescued people from both sides. She was almost sunk by a German mine and was strafed by the No. 307 Polish Night Fighter Squadron of the Royal Air Force. She rescued the Wild Rose of Liverpool and the survivors of the German destroyer Z27 and its escort, the survivors of which, in the latter case, were brought back to Ireland and interned until the end of hostilities.

== Background ==
=== Coasters ===
Transport within Ireland was very difficult in the aftermath of the Anglo-Irish War (1919–1921) and the subsequent Civil War (1921–1922). The road network had been neglected since World War I. Ireland had never had a comprehensive rail system due to the low population density of the country and those which had been built were reduced in capacity due to economic circumstances before the Second World War. It was, therefore, often faster and more economical to transport goods around the coast, rather than by road or rail. Coasters (Note: Coaster: as the name implies, these ships were suited to travelling close to shore, between ports on the same island. They were suited for shallow waters, unsuited for the oceans. The assumption was that if a storm threatened they could promptly reach the safety of a harbour.) fulfilled this need. The MV Kerlogue was such a coaster.

=== World War II ===
At the outbreak of World War II Ireland found itself with an inadequate number of ships. The number of ships had been declining, from 127 in 1923 to 56 in September 1939. Most of Ireland's international trade was carried on British Flagged vessels; with the outbreak of the war, most of these were no longer available. The United States ordered its ships not to enter the 'war zone'. As Irish-bound cargos were brought as far as Portugal, ships such as the Kerlogue found themselves on voyages for which they were not intended.

The usual route was to carry Irish agricultural exports to Britain. There they were refuelled and took on a British export to Spain or Portugal; often coal for the Lisbon electric power station. They travelled along the line of longitude at 12° West, while Allied convoys to Gibraltar were 20° West. Having discharged that export, they would collect the American cargo and return with it. Typical cargoes would have been: fertiliser, agricultural machinery, or wheat. If the American goods had not arrived, a "cargo of opportunity", such as wheat or fruit, was purchased.

== Construction ==
The MV Kerlogue was built in Rotterdam, Netherlands in September 1939, just prior to the outbreak of the war. She was 142 feet (43 m) long and measured 335 gross register tons. Her freeboard (height of deck above sea level) was just 1 foot (0.30 m). (Note: Coasters were intended to travel near the coast; if a storm arose they would head for the nearest harbour; so, a low freeboard was acceptable) She had a crew of eleven. Like other Irish ships, the word EIRE and the Irish tricolour were painted large on her sides and deck.

== Wild Rose of Liverpool ==
On 2 April 1941 a British convoy was attacked by German bombers, two miles south of Tuskar Rock. Distress rockets were seen by the Kerlogue which altered course to assist. A burning oil tanker, without survivors, and a crippled collier, the Wild Rose of Liverpool, were found. The collier was slowly sinking, had no power and her lifeboats had been destroyed by the bombing. The Kerlogue took the larger Wild Rose (Note: The Kerlogue was 335 GRT, the Wild Rose was 873 GRT) in tow and rescued the crew of thirteen. The Wild Rose was beached on Rosslare Strand to prevent her sinking. The Kerlogue was awarded £4,000 for salvage. The Wild Rose was repaired in the Liffey dockyard.

On 7 October 1941, while sailing from Swansea to Wexford, the Kerlogue struck a mine in Cardigan Bay.

== RAF attack ==
On 23 October 1943, 130 miles (210 km) south of Ireland, on passage from Port Talbot to Lisbon with a cargo of coal, (Note: the coal was a British export to Portugal) the Kerlogue was circled by an RAAF Sunderland flying boat. Three hours later, she was attacked by two initially unidentified aircraft, later found to have been Mosquito fighters of No. 307 Polish Night Fighter Squadron. For twenty minutes they repeatedly dived on the Kerlogue firing their cannons. Another RAAF Sunderland came by at six in the evening. By Aldis lamp, the Kerlogue requested an escort and medical assistance. The Sunderland replied that help could not be given. (Note: From records released under the thirty year rule: Flight-Lieutenant K Sampson RAAF: "12:55, Sighted Eire merchant vessel Kerlogue in 50°03' north, 9°16' west. On course 240° at 8 knots."; Two Mosquito planes, X and S, of No. 307 Polish Night Fighter Squadron: "16:17, 48°55' north, 9°13' west. Sighted and attacked with cannon 1,500 ton merchant vessel flying French flag and word EMPO clearly discerned on starboard side – the word France also on her bows. The vessel, which returned fire with cannon without effect, was left circling with smoke issuing from it. Also a quantity of oil was seen surrounding the vessel and drifting away."; (the unarmed, clearly marked, Kerlogue was 335 gross tons, not 1,500): Flying Officer C Clark RAAF: "18:05, Eire merchant vessel Kerlogue sighted in 49°49' north 9°11' west, steering 315° true at 5 knots. Circled merchant vessel, she flashed SOS and requested L to escort them as they had been attacked by aircraft and needed medical assistance for injured crew. Aircraft replied that escort could not be given and patrol was resumed"; The RAAF pilot later said that he assumed that the Kerlogue had radio communication)

The Kerlogue limped back to Cobh. When her cargo of coal was discharged, shell fragments of British origin were found. It was that cargo of coal which saved the Kerlogue; without it, the shells would have penetrated her hull.

The British Naval Attaché in Dublin reported to the Director of Naval Intelligence that it was "unfortunate from a British point of view" that Captain Fortune had been involved in the Kerlogue incident as he was "always ready to pass on any information in his possession". The RAF would not apportion blame on the Poles, as the Kerlogue was "east of 12 degrees west". According to an Admiralty report, the RAF had been "warned to expect the Kerlogue", they "knew she was at sea on the day of the attack", there was "nothing suspicious" about the ship, "anyone but Polish pilots would have hesitated to attack". The matter was considered by the War Cabinet which authorised ex gratia payments to the injured crew.

Captain Desmond Fortune, who would never walk unaided again, was succeeded by Captain Thomas Donohue. He had been captain of The Lady Belle of Waterford when she was bombed by the Luftwaffe. Donohue had spent eight hours in a lifeboat mid-Atlantic when the German U-607 torpedoed the SS Irish Oak.

== Z27, T25 and T26 ==
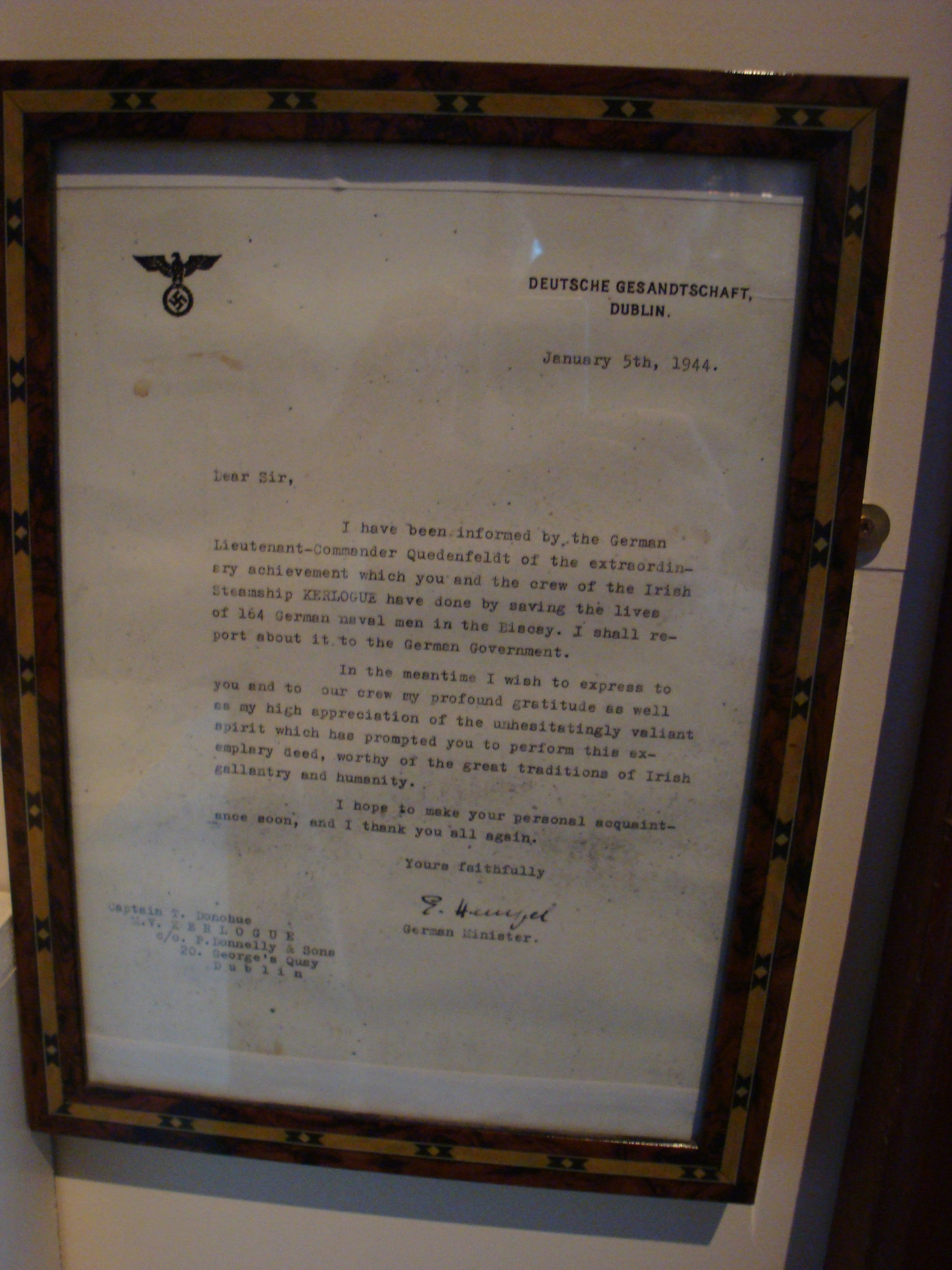
Letter from German Embassy thanking Captain of the MV Kerlogue, 1944, Maritime Museum, Dún Laoghaire

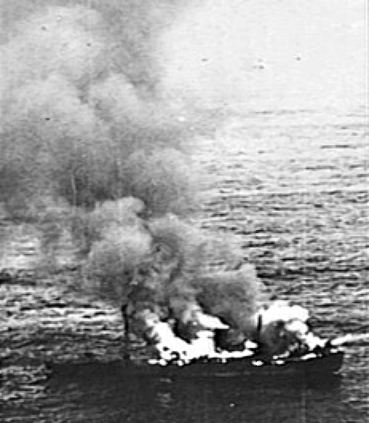
German blockade runner Alsterufer burning after having been attacked No. 311 Squadron RAF

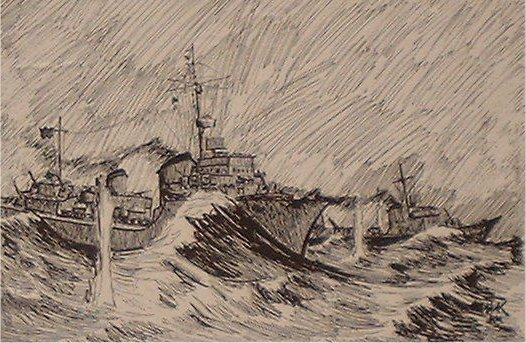
View from Z27 of T25 and T26 being shelled, sketch by Hans Helmut Karsch, who donated it the National Maritime Museum of Ireland

On 29 December 1943, following repairs in Cork, the Kerlogue was 360 miles (580 km) south of Fastnet Rock, on passage from Lisbon to Dublin with a cargo of oranges, when she was circled by a German long range reconnaissance aircraft signalling "SOS" and heading southeast. The Kerlogue altered course to southeast, where she came upon an appalling scene. The German Narvik-class destroyer Z27 and two Elbing class torpedo boats, T25 and T26, had been sunk. More than 700 men, most of them dead, were in the water. They had intended to escort Alsterufer, (Note: Alsterufer had already been sunk) a blockade runner. The cruisers HMS Glasgow and Enterprise, as part of Operation Stonewall, with their 6-inch (152 mm) guns sank the German ships while beyond their range of fire (more than ten miles) (Note: Operation Stonewall consisted of a number of engagements. Eight German ships were engaged.)

The Kerlogue spent ten hours plucking survivors from the water. 168 were rescued, although four died on board. (Note: A further 62 were rescued by Royal Navy minesweepers, and four by Spanish destroyers.) This was remarkable, given that the Kerlogue was only 142 feet (43 m) long. The cargo of oranges saved the rescued from dehydration. Captain Donohue ignored the German request to bring them to Brest or La Rochelle. He also ignored British radio orders from Land's End to go to Fishguard. He berthed at Cobh on 1 January 1944. Earlier U-505 had rescued 34 survivors. Later U-618 rescued a further 21.

The rescued Germans remained at the Curragh internment camp until the war was over. Two are buried in Glencree German War Cemetery.

== Post-war ==
In the post-war period, the rescue of the Germans was rarely mentioned, until 27 April 1994, when then-Senator Dick Roche spoke, in the Senate, of his father's role:

"... My late father was a seaman with the Wexford Steamship Company. He served the nation, like so many young men, through dangerous times in the war years. In every sense he and his colleagues put their lives on the line day after day, in ships which today would not be licensed to go on the high seas, to bring supplies to this nation. Many of his colleagues and friends and many people from Wexford and around the coast paid the ultimate price in serving this nation by losing their lives. The ships were so rickety, old and derelict that we would not go to sea in them today. Yet, these brave, perhaps foolhardy, men crossed the Atlantic, went to the Mediterranean and North African coast and kept Ireland supplied with vital provisions. My father's ship, the Kerlogue, was involved in one of the great rescues of the war. One of the proudest possessions I have is a decoration awarded to him and other members of the crew for rescuing German sailors in the Bay of Biscay in December 1943, when they hauled hundreds of young men from the water ... ... "

The Kerlogue was sold to Norway in 1957 and was wrecked off Tromsø in 1960.

On 27 May 1994 the German Navy expressed its thanks in a ceremony at the National Maritime Museum of Ireland attended by President Mary Robinson. Some sketches of the rescue, (reproduced on this page) drawn while in the Curragh were presented and remain on display with other artefacts.

The rescue by the Kerlogue has been recreated in a novel entitled, The Lonely Sea and Sky by the Irish poet and novelist, Dermot Bolger, whose father sailed during the war on the Kerlogue’s sister ship, the MV Edenvale. Bolger's novel is part historical fiction and part coming-of-age tale in charting the maiden voyage of a fictional fourteen-year-old Wexford boy, Jack Roche, who gets a job as a cabin boy on the Kerlogue in December 1943, on the eve of this treacherous wartime journey to Portugal. Jack has lost his seafaring father on board the Kyleclare, sunk by a U-boat on this same route, and goes to sea to support his family. His innate decency makes him join in this dangerous rescue of members of a navy whom he passionately hates for having killed his father. He comes to see the terrified German survivors not as part of a vicious murder machine but as shivering, wounded individuals, some little older than him, caught in a war that is not of their own making. The novel is premised around a view that The Kerlogue's crew obeyed an unwritten code to save any lives they could. In risking their lives, they recognised the drowning Germans not as combatants but as fellow sailors, and honoured what sailors traditionally believe the initials SOS stand for: “Save our Souls”.

== See also ==
- Operation Stonewall
- Irish neutrality during World War II
- The Emergency
- Irish Mercantile Marine during World War II
- Battle of the Atlantic
