= No. 307 Polish Night Fighter Squadron =

No. 307 (Lwow) Squadron RAF
- 307 Squadron Logo
- Active: 24 August 1940 – 2 January 1947
- Country: United Kingdom
- Allegiance: (Poland) Polish government in exile
- Branch: Royal Air Force
- Role: Night fighter
- Size: squadron
- Part of: RAF Fighter Command
- Nickname(s): Lwow; Eagle-owls

Commanders
- Notable commanders: Stanisław Grodzicki

Insignia
- Squadron Codes: EW (August 1940 – January 1947)

No. 307 (Polish) Squadron, also known as No. 307 (City of Lwów) Squadron (Polish: 307 Dywizjon Myśliwski Nocny "Lwowskich Puchaczy") was a Polish squadron formed in Great Britain as part of an agreement between the Polish Government in Exile and the United Kingdom in 1940. It was one of 15 squadrons of the Polish Air Force in exile that served alongside the Royal Air Force in World War II. It was the only Polish night fighter squadron in RAF service. It was named after the Polish city of Lwów, and was nicknamed "Eagle Owls".

== History ==
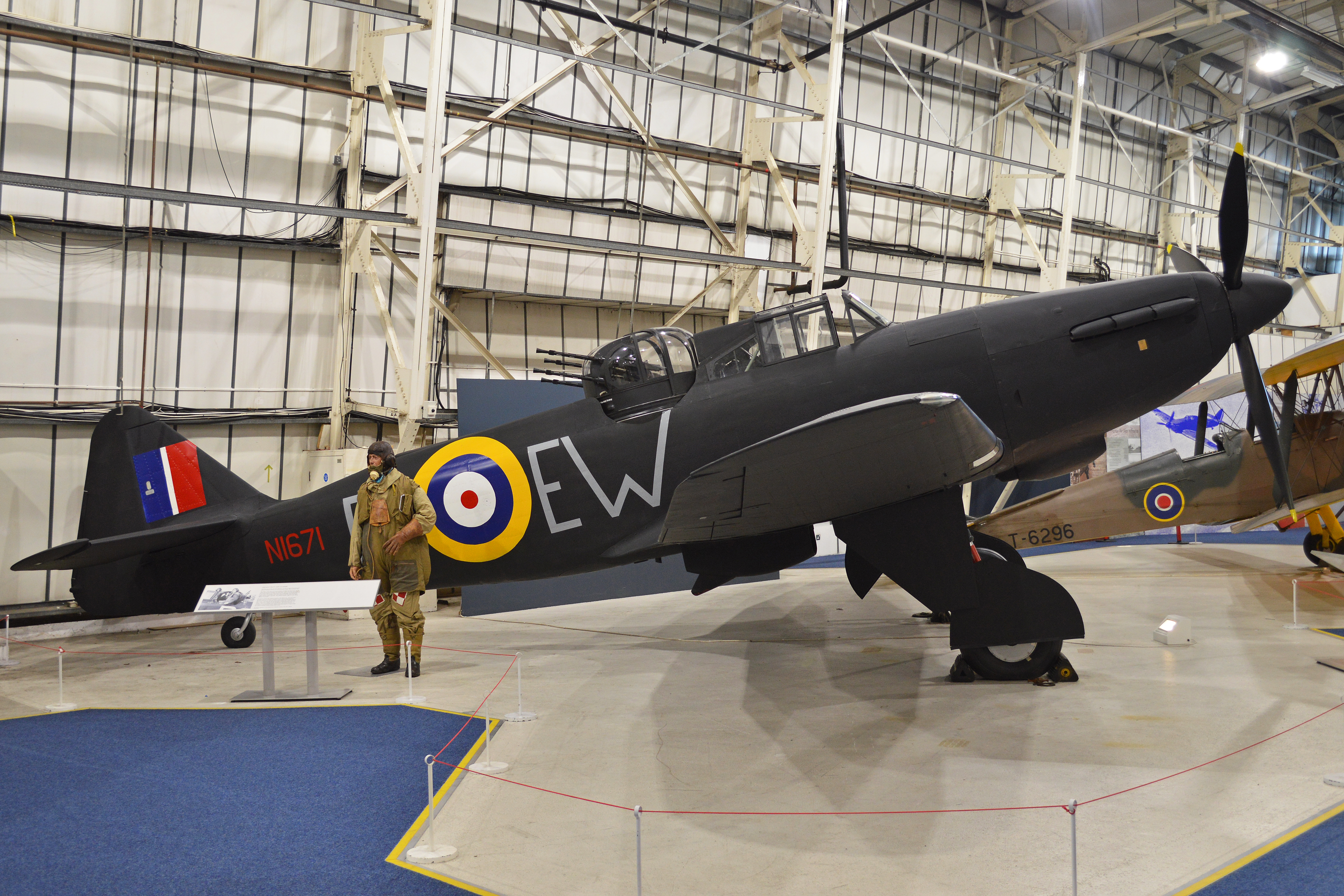
Defiant N1671 from No. 307 (Polish) Squadron at the RAF Museum London

The nickname Lwowskie Puchacze (NOM) – "Lwów Eagle Owls" was chosen for the night fighter squadron, as the eagle owl is a nighttime avian predator that is present in Poland. The squadron inherited the traditions of the Polish pre-war 6th Aviation Regiment, that was stationed in Lwów (now Lviv), with a history dating back to the battle of Lwów and Galicia against Ukrainian forces in the Polish-Ukrainian War of 1918–1919.

After its formation in Blackpool on 24 August 1940, No. 307 Squadron was assembled at RAF Kirton-in-Lindsey on 5 September 1940 as a night fighter unit, flying the Boulton Paul Defiant turret-fighter. It then took up residence at RAF Jurby, on the Isle of Man. The sole surviving example of the Boulton Paul Defiant, serial number N1671, served in the squadron and can be seen on display at the Royal Air Force Museum Cosford.

In August 1941 the squadron converted to Beaufighters which it flew until being re-equipped with Mosquitoes in December 1942.

Between April 1941 and April 1943 the squadron was based at RAF Clyst Honiton, now Exeter Airport, defending South West England from enemy night bombers. The first Beaufighter victory was on 1 November 1941, when a crew shot down one Dornier Do 217 from II./KG 2 and damaged another (claimed as shot down). That month, two more bombers were shot down and one damaged. However, several of the squadron's aircraft were lost in crashes in the following months, mostly due to weather conditions or the unreliable engines of the Beaufighter Mk IIF variant.

On 3/4 May 1942 when 40 Junkers Ju 88 bombers attacked Exeter as part of the Exeter Blitz of the Baedeker raids there were only three Polish No. 307 Squadron Beaufighters available to defend the city. They managed to intercept and shoot down four of the German bombers that night (all confirmed kills). That month, the squadron re-equipped with the improved Beaufighter Mk VIF. In total, Beaufighter crews shot down fifteen bombers with three probables and six damaged; the last victory was the shooting down of a Do 217 on 24/25 September 1942.

From 1943 the squadron was based at RAF Predannack, Cornwall, and was active as a night intruder unit over airfields in occupied France. This changed in January 1945, when its role was switched to bomber support, combating German night fighters. In 1945–46 it was based at RAF Horsham St Faith near Norwich. The squadron was disbanded on 2 January 1947 after the end of World War II.

== Commanding officers ==
C/O's of No. 307 Squadron
From	To	Name	Notes
Sep 1940	Mar 1941	S/Ldr. George Charlie Tomlinson	British Officer
Sep 1940	Oct 1940	Kpt. Stanisław Pietraszkiewicz	Polish co-commander
Oct 1940	Nov 1940	Maj. Kazimierz Benz	Polish co-commander
Nov 1940	Jun 1941	Lt.Col. Stanisław Grodzicki	First as co-commander, later as Squadron Leader
Jun 1941	Oct 1941	Kpt. Jerzy Antonowicz	
Oct 1941	Nov 1941	Por. Maksymilian Lewandowski	temporary commander
Nov 1941	Aug 1942	Maj. Stanisław Brejniak	Wing Commander
Aug 1942	Mar 1943	Kpt. Jan Michałowski, VM, KW, DFC	Wing Commander
Mar 1943	Apr 1943	Kpt. Gerard Ranoszek	temporary commander
Apr 1943	Jan 1944	Maj. Jerzy Orzechowski	Wing Commander
Jan 1944	May 1944	Kpt. Maksymilian Lewandowski	Wing Commander
May 1944	Mar 1945	Kpt. Gerard Ranoszek	Wing Commander
Mar 1945	Mar 1946	Kpt. Stanisław Andrzejewski	Wing Commander
Mar 1946	Jan 1947	Kpt. Jerzy Damsz	Wing Commander

== Aircraft operated ==
Aircraft operated by No. 307 Squadron
From	To	Aircraft	Version
17 September 1940	August 1941	Boulton Paul Defiant	Mk.I
14 August 1941	May 1942	Bristol Beaufighter	Mk.IIf
5 May 1942	February 1943	Bristol Beaufighter	Mk.VIf
21 December 1942	January 1945	de Havilland Mosquito	NF.II
19 June 1943	October 1943	de Havilland Mosquito	NF.VI
22 January 1944	November 1944	de Havilland Mosquito	NF.XII, NF.XIII
24 October 1944	January 1947	de Havilland Mosquito	NF.30

== Honors ==
On 15 November 2019, the Polish 307 night fighter squadron was honoured for defending the British city of Exeter from a German blitz campaign during the second World War. A Polish white-and-red flag flew over the city in the South West England honouring the pilots who prevented the complete destruction of Exeter in the 1942 Luftwaffe attack.

== See also ==
- MV Kerlogue neutral ship attacked
- Polish Air Forces in France and Great Britain
- Military history of Poland during World War II
- List of RAF squadrons
