= De Wadden =

Three-masted auxiliary schooner

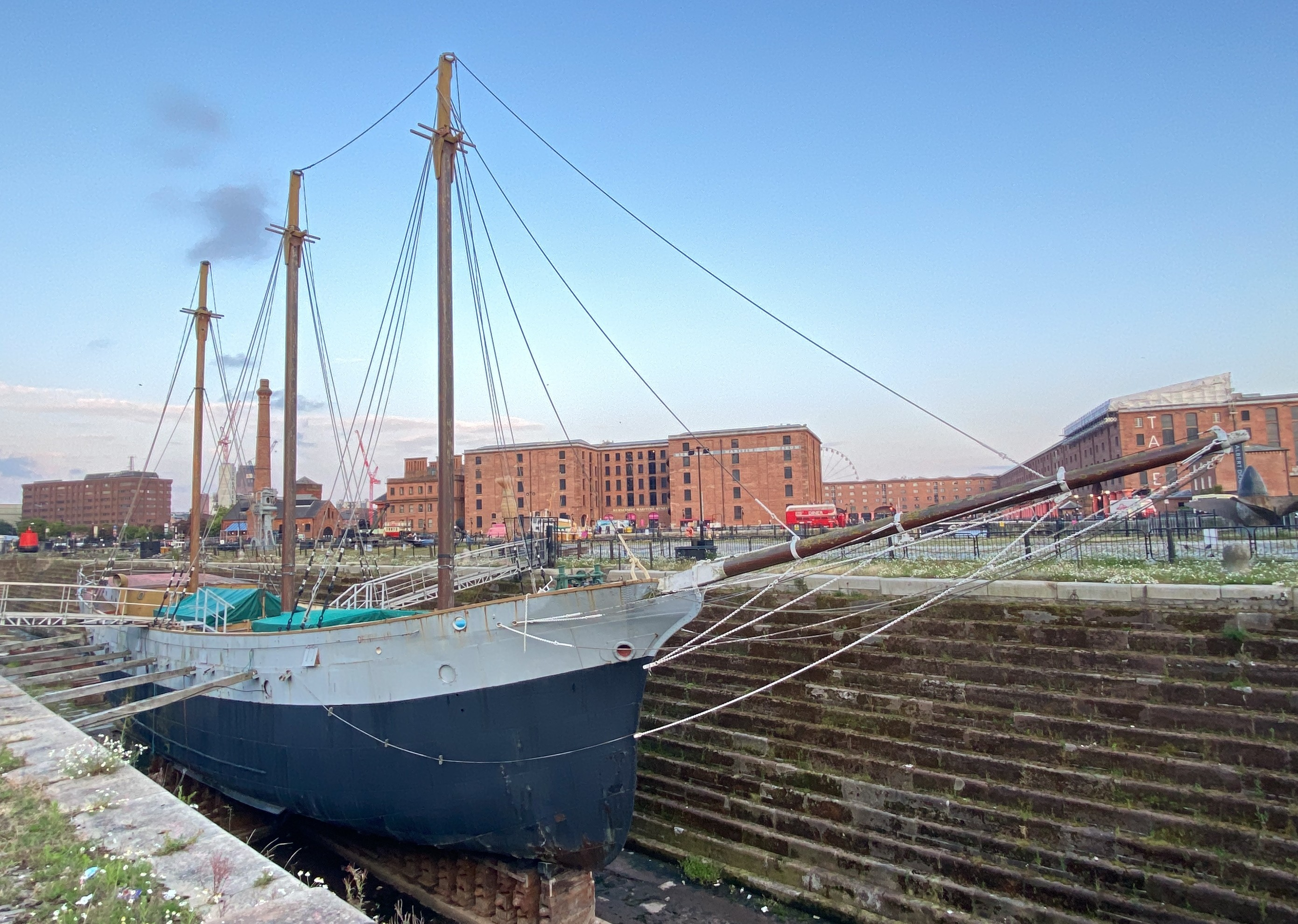
- Pictured in Canning Graving Dock No.2, July 20th, 2023.

History

Ireland
- Name: De Wadden
- Namesake: Wadden Sea
- Owner: Nederlandsche Stoomvaart Maatschappij (1917–1922); Richard T. Hall (1922–1940s); Victor Hall (1940s–1961); Unnamed Owner (1961); Terry E. McSweeney (circa 1961–1972); Kenneth M. Kennedy (1972–1984); National Museums Liverpool (1984–2024)
- Port of registry: Amsterdam, Netherlands (1917–1922); Arklow, Ireland (1922–1961); Dublin, Ireland (1968–1972); Greenock, Scotland (1972–1987); Dublin, Ireland (1987–2024)
- Builder: Gebroeders Van Diepen, Waterhuizen
- Yard number: 490
- Acquired: July 4, 1917
- In service: July 1917
- Identification: Official number: 5797 AMST 1917 (1917) 144980 (1922) Callsign: QBPS (1917–1922), EIKF (1922–present)
- Fate: Scrapped Feb-Mar 2024
- Notes: Bow section amongst other pieces to be preserved in Arklow

General characteristics
- Type: Auxiliary Schooner
- Tonnage: 251 GRT (as built); 239 GRT (1949), 190 net tons
- Length: 116.72 feet (35.60m) Between Perpendiculars 122 feet (37.19m) from bow to stern 152 feet (46.33m) LOA (longest bowsprit)
- Beam: 24.39 feet (7.44m)
- Depth: 10.16 feet (3.10m)
- Decks: 1
- Installed power: 125hp Steywal Dutch engine (as built); 80hp Bolinder engine and a 50hp Kelvin engine (November 1926); 150hp six cylinder Crossley DR diesel engine (1941/42); 450hp Caterpillar diesel engine (1980)
- Propulsion: Twin Screw, Sail
- Speed: 5 knots (SteyWal Engine)
- Crew: 6

De Wadden was a steel-hulled, three-masted auxiliary schooner that was built in 1917 by Gebroeders Van Diepen of Waterhuizen, Netherlands. She and her two sister ships, De Lauwers and De Dollart, were ordered by the NV Nederlandsche Stoomvaart Maatschappij 'Bestevaer' (C. Goudriaan & Co.) in order to take advantage of the unique trading conditions the Dutch had during the First World War due to their neutrality. She spent most of her working life as an Irish Sea trading vessel and was preserved as a museum ship in Liverpool, England, from 1984 until her deconstruction in 2024.

== Netherlands Steamship Company (1917–1922) ==
De Wadden was delivered on July 4, 1917, by Gebroeders Van Diepen of Waterhuizen, fitted with an inboard 125-horsepower two-stroke diesel engine manufactured by the Machine Factory Steyaard & Jannette Walen, in Rotterdam, to supplement her complement of sail, and had entered service by March 1918, being advertised as sailing from Rotterdam to Bergen. The crew aboard consisted of five men and a boy, and since she could sail a marine engineer was not required.

She and De Lauwers survived the war, while De Dollart was sunk by German submarine U-82. A year after the war on December 22, 1919, she was assisted into Great Yarmouth with engine damage and a damaged anchor pillar. She continued to sail with the Netherlands Steamship Company until the war's shipping boom had calmed, at which point she was no longer a useful asset, leading to her sale on 27 February 1922 to Richard Hall of Arklow, Ireland.

== Arklow Years (1922–1961) ==
At the time of his purchase of De Wadden in Rotterdam, Richard T. Hall was expanding his fleet of schooners in Arklow. He was a well known ship-owner in Liverpool and Arklow, having served his time at sea on Liverpool square-riggers.He would make few alterations to the ship, mainly consisting of structural changes in the hold where crew quarters were built. She was put into service by her new owner as an Irish Sea trading vessel, sailing out of the River Mersey to various Irish ports carrying cargoes such as grain, pit-props, china clay, mineral ores, manure, timber, and coal, eventually becoming the last schooner to trade in the British Isles. The Hall family had experience owning and operating schooners, having owned many others including the Cymric. Her original 125-horsepower SteyWal engine was replaced with an 80 hp Bolinder engine purchased from the Admiralty after a major failure in the crankcase, and she was also fitted with a 50 hp Kelvin engine to give additional power. This meant that in order for both engines to work in unison she had to be given a second propeller, which was placed on her port side. This made her unique in that she had no starboard counterpart.

De Wadden was laid up between September 6th 1932 to January 12th 1933 at Arklow. In the late 1930s, her bowsprit and topmasts were shortened, and even more so following World War II, the bowsprit being reduced to a stump. Loading and discharging in this time was done with the ship's gear, by use of booms hoisted and rigged with lifting tackle. The shrinkage of the foremast deckhouse allowed for a motor winch to be installed up forward in its own deckhouse, with drum ends on either side to be used in sail hoisting and cargo work. The crew was composed of a captain, engineer, bosun, cook, seaman, and a boy. The ship was well-remembered by those who served on her.

During the Second World War, De Wadden was one of few vessels providing a vital lifeline of supplies to the Irish Republic. She survived the war. Between August 1941 and January 1942 her engines, of which only the Bolinder still functioned, were replaced again by a six-cylinder 150 hp Crossley DR diesel, which was overhauled at Pomona Dock in Manchester between July 10th and August 10th 1951 during a refit which saw her receive a new main deck and bulwarks. The ship was involved in a collision with the Belfast steamer Craigolive in 1951 but was repaired.

Following the passing of Richard Hall, his son, Victor, took ownership of De Wadden. Come the filming for the film 'Moby Dick' in 1954, a handful of Arklow ships, namely the Harvest King and the James Postlethwaite were used, and De Wadden was at one moment considered to play the Pequod but her owner wished to keep her trading. The ship was involved in a collision with the Belfast steamer Craigolive while discharging cargo on November 10th, 1956, leaving her aft shell plating seriously damaged. She was repaired by Grayson Rollo and Glover Docks Ltd. in Garston, Liverpool and was soon back into service after two months.

On May 8, 1958, the ship would make its last trip on the River Blackwater, becoming the last ever schooner to do so, marking the end of river-based transport servicing the catchment. This was due to the fact that the newly built Youghal Bridge preventing any large sailing ship from passing under it and further upriver. Overall, the ship made 43 passages over the Blackwater between 1936 and 1958. She was known to carry cargo to and from the stonebuilt quays at Killahalla and Cappoquin, as well as Dromana.

De Wadden met rough weather in May 1959, while on a crossing from the River Mersey to Crosshaven, Ireland, simultaneous to developing engine trouble, forcing her to shelter at Waterford. She was repaired and arrived at Crosshaven three days later. She threw a propeller blade in September 1959, stopping at Dun Laoghaire for repairs.

In 1961, De Wadden would be retired from commercial trade as steadily each ship with the capacity for sail was withdrawn, replaced in favour of modern motor-driven ships. De Wadden became one of three ships with sail left trading out of Ireland by the year she retired, the other two being the schooner Kathleen and May, and the ketch Result. De Wadden's direct replacement would be the 1948-built Stevonia, renamed River Avoca.

The ship had seven captains during the period of Richard Hall's ownership. The first, named Edward Hall, was Richard's brother, whose career at sea ended after falling between the ship and a quay, being severely injured in the event. Her second captain, a man named William Kearon, commanded the ship for five years in the 1920s. He died when a vessel he was commanding during WWII was torpedoed and sunk. Captain George Kearon, a first cousin to William, would follow as captain of De Wadden, serving for a short time before moving to the Julia, handing captaincy to his son, also named George. The Kearon family was plagued by tragedy, having lost two cousins at sea in WWI, then George's transfer with his son leading to his own demise as well as two of his brothers when the Julia was lost at sea on or around February 21st 1931 after departing Greenock for Newhaven with a cargo of pig iron on the 17th of the same month. Ted Kearon, another cousin, would be lost while commanding a midget submarine during the attack on the German battleship Tirpitz in WWII. George Kearon was succeeded by Victor Hall, Richard Hall's son, and would become her longest serving captain, spanning the years between 1932 and 1952; and he would also go on to help accumulate much of the information that the Merseyside Maritime Museum has on the vessel later. Her next captain was named James Hagan, one of the best known Arklow schoonermen, previously commanding ships including the barque Cupicia and the schooner Happy Harry. Her final captain under Arklow ownership would be Bobby Price, serving until the schooner gave way to modern motor coasters and was sold into private ownership in 1961.

== Final years of service (1961–1984) ==
=== Terry E. McSweeney (1961–1972) ===
De Wadden was sold to Scotland to an unknown owner for a fee of £8,000 in 1961, where after bringing a cargo of cars to Greenock, she would be sold again to Terry E. McSweeney, a Dublin man, who converted her to a houseboat, with possible plans for becoming a passenger vessel however this never materialised. She ended up at Long Loch, near Blairmore, Argyll, Scotland at anchorage, held by two large anchors, one up forward and one aft, and a rope tied to a tree. Her hull was covered in rust caused by rainwater, and paint was peeling from the masts and deckhouses. Marine growth covered the bottom, hiding corrosion. She would often take to the bottom until Terry would sell her off to an old friend named Kenneth Kennedy, a local of Dunoon who had helped sail her up to the Clyde from Siloth-on-Solway when Terry had bought her.

=== Kenneth Kennedy (1972–1984) ===
Kenneth had purchased the ship as he required transport for carrying sand from the river mouth to his building business in Dunoon, Scotland. He was able to convince his family with talk of sailing holidays. After purchasing the ship, months were spent getting her ready. Her hull was scraped of any marine growth, and she was repainted in a dark maroon, with a white band above it to create a contrast. Her Crossley D.R.6 150 bhp two-stroke diesel engine took three months to repair and get working again. Other modifications made to the ship would be the various different wheelhouses she would have, the movement of her galley aft, and the installation of a saloon over the top of the aft cargo hatch. Other modifications would be made, including accommodation and machinery alterations, including the replacement of her Crossley engine with a 450 hp Caterpillar engine, which would be her final engine. She went on to carry sand and take out fishing parties, as well as being used for family vacations. In 1977, Kenneth received the first of many calls asking for the ship to feature in media, starting with the BBC series The Onedin Line. This first venture went smoothly, however when they were contacted again the next year for filming of another series, things would go awry. En route to the filming location, Milford Haven, the ship was struck by a piece of driftwood which punched a hole through the plating. The ship began to sink, though Kenneth and his crewmate, Alec, were able to beach the ship along the Ayrshire Coast at Lendalfoot. The ship would remain there for six weeks, with Kenneth even considering scrapping her, though he was convinced to salvage the ship and she was brought home. She would suffer various faults in this time, but was always repaired. She also starred in Mendelssohn in Scotland, which was filmed at Staffa, an island off the coast of Mull in 1979, as well as The Lost Tribe which was filmed at Lossiemouth in 1980. She was eventually painted white and this would be her final guise that Kenneth had given her. During her time under his ownership, she rarely had regular crew, so was crewed by friends and family on an amateur basis. The most consistent of his crewmates was a man named Alec. Her complement of sail was not used much by Mr. Kennedy due to the condition of the masts and rigging at the time of purchase, but he was eventually able to due to replacing the mainmast and repairing all of the sail equipment.

Both the Highlands and Islands Development Board and a Dutch Preservation Society had shown interest in the vessel, but neither came to invest or purchase her. Kenneth would ultimately sell the ship to the Merseyside Maritime Museum for £20,000 an initial asking price of £35,000 in 1984, the organisation considering her a "good buy".

== Merseyside Maritime Museum (1984–2024) ==
Following her purchase by the museum, she arrived off the Mersey Bar on 5 August 1984 after having travelled from Dunoon, and anchored off of Monks Ferry until the next day. She was then moored in the Canning Half Tide Dock outside of the museum building itself. Between 1984 and 1987, the additional superstructure she had gained during her final years of service was gradually removed and placed into storage due to suffering damage caused by rot, as well as the museum wishing to restore her to her Irish Sea Trading Vessel configuration. The last piece to be removed was the ship's wheelhouse, remaining in place as late as 1986.

In late 1987, the vessel was moved into No. 2 Canning Graving Dock in order to enable the museum to carry out further maintenance and restoration. For a brief time in the 1990s the vessel was open for tours and educational sessions, though she was closed for further conservation work, including the replacement of her poop deck coamings, extensive work on her hull, and the making and fitting of new masts and a bowsprit. According to the Irish Independent, Victor Hall funded the purchase of the materials that would form the new masts and bowsprit.

In June 2022, National Museums Liverpool (NML) announced that it had launched a feasibility study on De Wadden's future, and was considering disposing of the vessel as the costs of ongoing repairs and maintenance were unsustainable. Several options were formed by NML as for what could be done to De Wadden, including moving the vessel to another location within NML's estate. This option was discounted due to the significance of the costs involved. This left her owners with two options, either disposal by deconstruction, or disposal by transfer to another organisation. In October 2022, NML's board of trustees agreed to the disposal of De Wadden, and between December 2022 and February 2023 a notice of intent to deconstruct was posted to the National Historic Ships website. Even after the declaration of intent to deconstruct was made, the museum continued to welcome potential transfer options up until February 2023. No suitable buyer was discovered, however, so it was agreed that disposal by transfer was not a realistic option. Following this, the final recommendation was made to NML's board of trustees in March 2023 and the decision to dispose of De Wadden via deconstruction was made, with the process to begin towards the end of 2023. The museum said that it would preserve as much of De Wadden as possible, keeping certain parts of the ship and detailed records using photogrammetry. NML's board of trustees later approved the commencement of the digital recording of the ship as of November 9th 2023, with a 3D digital cutaway scan of the ship already being produced. Lakeland Arts, a registered charity involved, stated that, "Comprising more than 3,500 photographs and accompanied by high resolution panoramas, this 3D scan will capture as much data as possible to produce a comprehensive digital twin/record of the ship, suitable for contemporary museum interpretation and research, and production of a scale model if this were to be needed at a future date."

== Disposal ==
On 2 November 2023, National Museums Liverpool posted a tender for the appointment of a contractor to dismantle and dispose of the vessel De Wadden. The description stated that the contract would last three months, specifically between January 1, 2024, and March 31, 2024, and would cost between £150,000 and £200,000. The contract demanded that the dismantling of the ship be completed by March 2024. Applications were open until December 6th 2023, at 10 am. According to NML, "The procurement documents detail the steps that the appointed contractor must comply with to ensure we remove the vessel safely and compliantly and gives a detailed plan of the methodology for the sectioning and removal of the vessel."

By December 2023 a plan to relocate parts of the ship to Ireland had been developed by the Arklow Maritime Museum, Arklow Shipping, and the local authorities. Deconstruction of the ship began on February 26, 2024, after much delay. On March 4, 2024, the forward mast of the schooner was being lifted from the ship, when it suddenly broke in half. The top half of the mast remained in the dry dock where it fell, and the bottom half was moved on land. This incident resulted in a health and safety meeting soon after. By April 9, her bow, stern and other parts had arrived in Arklow. On March 22, 2024, the final piece of the ship, the keel, was dismantled.
