= Arklow Heritage Museum =

Maritime museum in Arklow, County Wicklow, Ireland

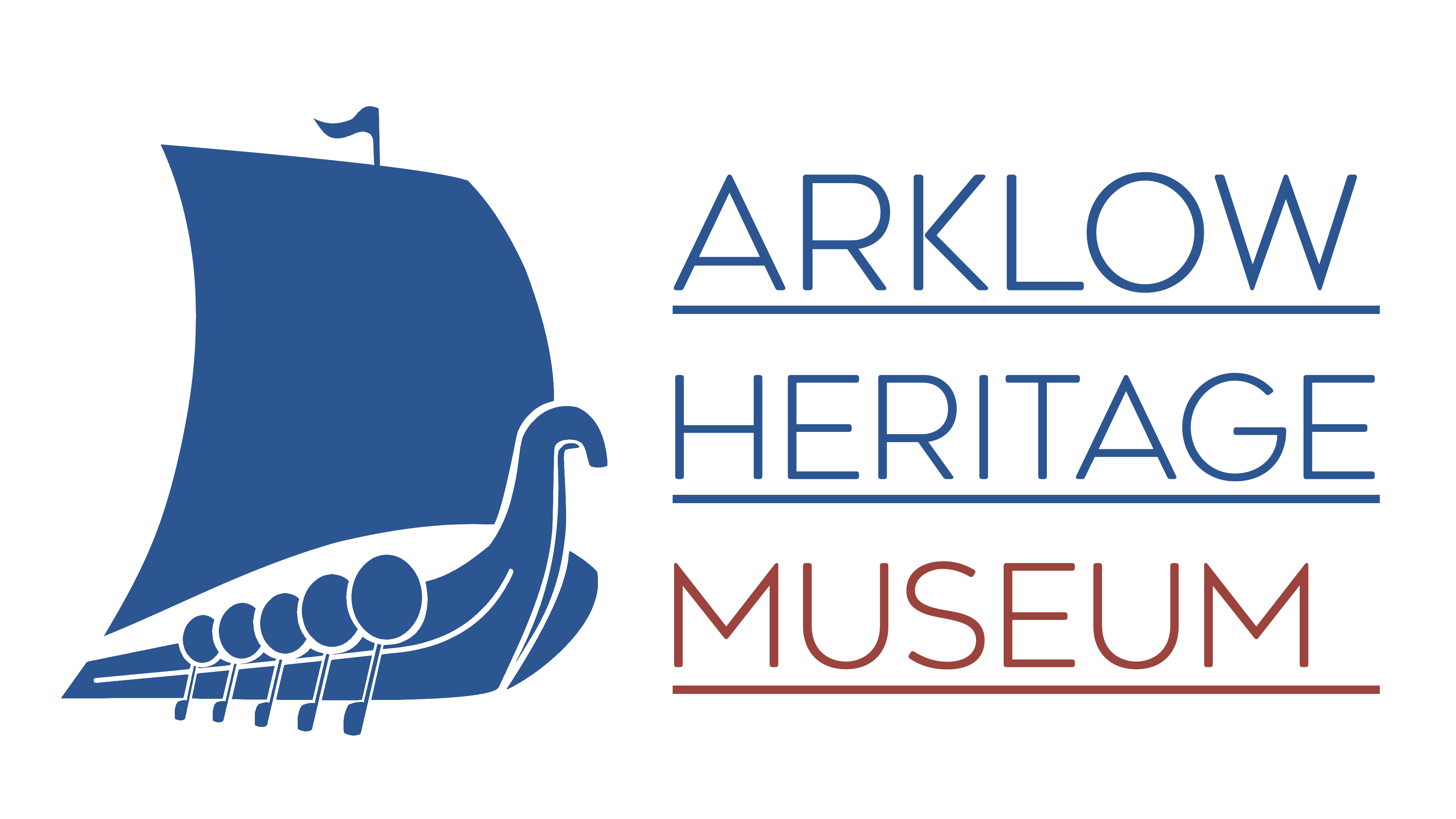

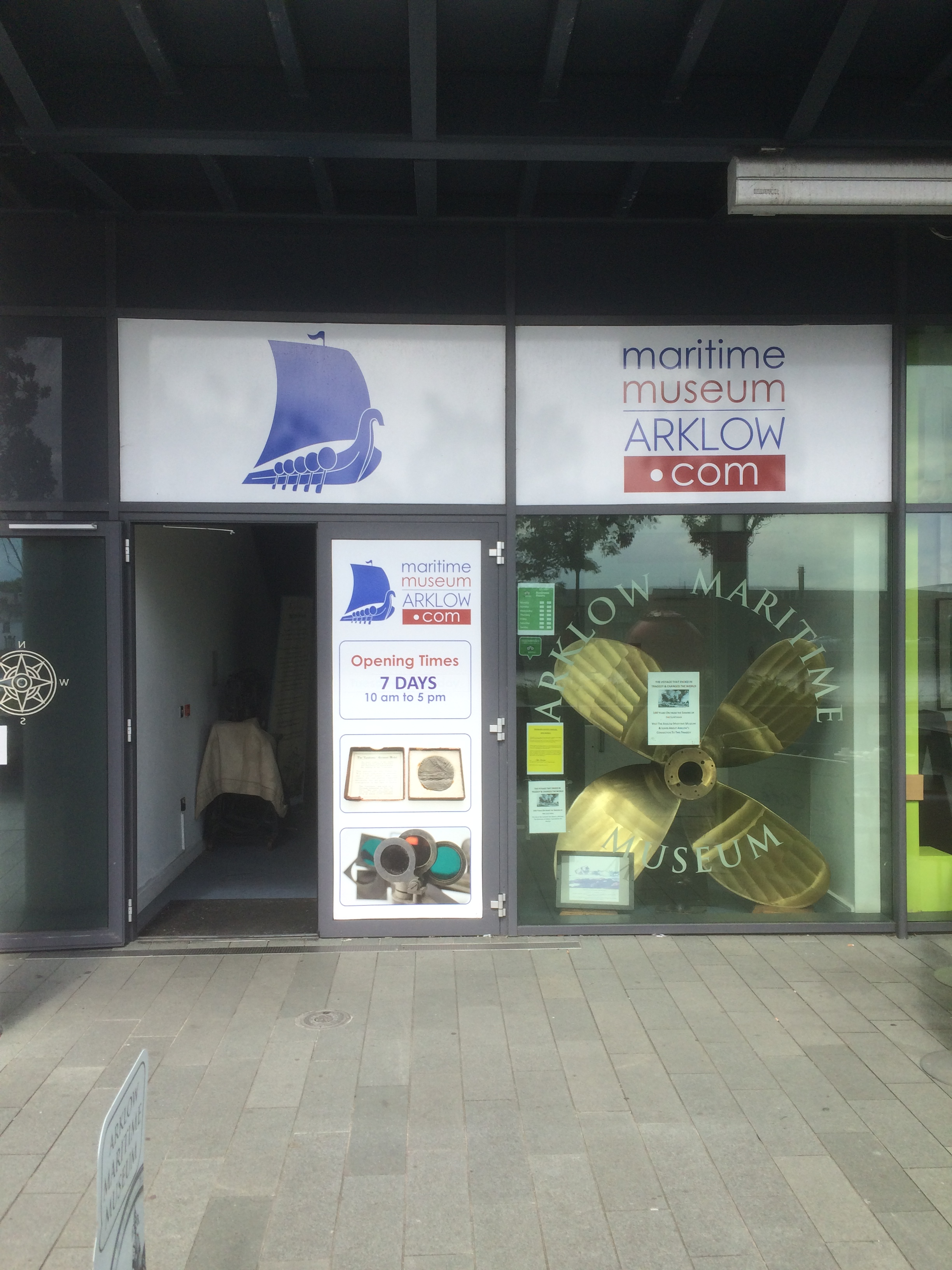
- Museum exterior

- Location within Ireland
- Established: 1976
- Location: Bridgewater Shopping Centre, North Quay, Arklow, Ireland
- Coordinates: 52.7985°N 6.1494°W
- Type: Heritage museum
- Public transit access: Arklow railway station Bus Éireann Route 2
- Website: Arklow Heritage Museum

The Arklow Heritage Museum (formerly the Arklow Maritime Museum) opened in 1976 in the old technical school on Saint Marys Road in Arklow, County Wicklow. Its original purpose was to celebrate the town's rich seafaring heritage, described by the late maritime historian John de Courcy Ireland in a letter to the museum as "Ireland's Most Maritime Town". In 2009, the museum moved to its current location at the Bridgewater Shopping Centre. As the scope of the museum has evolved to cover the general history of Arklow, the museum renamed itself to the Arklow Heritage Museum as of 2025.

== History ==
=== Establishment ===
As of the early 20th century, many families in Arklow had some connection with the sea, whether it was fishing, coasting or deep-sea sailing. While many houses had souvenirs or artefacts relating to these activities, by the 1970s, such items were being discarded. Aware that this would see Arklow's maritime heritage disappear, a group of people got together to save what they could for future generations. A one-off exhibition was held in the Marlborough Hall on St Mary's Road around 1970 or 1971.

On 17 and 18 March 1973, a second Maritime Exhibition was held. This time the venue was St. Kevin's Christian Brothers' School on Coolgreaney Road. The entire upper floor space was filled with a display even larger than the first exhibition. The organising committee also compiled a newsletter containing articles about:

- Arklow fishermen who were contracted by the Congested Districts Board for Ireland to go to the Aran Islands and other locations on the west coast to teach the people there how to establish and maintain a commercial fishery
- The first Arklow man torpedoed in World War II
- Ships and memories
- The names of Arklow men on the Tower Hill Memorial in London
- Arklow schooner DE WADDEN
- Life on the Arklow Lightship
- Arklow's connection with the RMS Lusitania disaster

Also included was a letter from Don Patterson of the Institute of Irish Studies in Queen's University, Belfast. Committee secretary had written to Arthur Reynolds, editor of the newspaper Irish Skipper, asking him to mention the exhibition which Reynolds did in the March issue. Don Patterson was quick to send what information he had that he felt would help the committee establish a permanent museum, with the Arklow Schooner DE WADDEN as its centre-point. Obtaining the DE WADDEN would have proven to be impossible for a variety of reasons, the finance involved being too large.

At the same time, public meetings were held and soon offers of items on loan or permanent donation were being made to the committee. After securing a permanent structure to house the exhibits it had collected in the form of a prefabricated shelter donated by the ESB, Arklow Maritime Museum officially opened on 20 February 1976.

== Collection ==
Arklow Maritime Museum has now collected over two thousand exhibits. Some of its most popular items include:

- A display on the Kynoch munitions factory, which employed several thousand people at the height of production and suffered an explosion that killed seventeen people on 21 September 1917
- A section on the RNLI, Arklow was the site of the first lifeboat station in Ireland to be opened under the RNLI banner
- A display on the RMS Lusitania, whose survivors were rescued by Arklow fishermen. Artifacts on display include various medals and a lady's shoe.
- A scale model of various ships including the Asgard II, which was built in Arklow and sank in the Bay of Biscay in 2008
- Various ships models, equipment and paintings

== Irish ships built in Arklow ==
The following is a list of ships built in Arklow, or have a major Arklow connection, that have a display and/or a further source of information in the Arklow Maritime Museum:

- Asgard II
- Cymric, schooner
- Gypsy Moth III, sailed by Sir Francis Chichester and winner of the first single-handed transatlantic yacht race, which had been founded by 'Blondie' Hasler
- James Postlethwaite
- Mary B Mitchell, schooner
- MV Murell
- MV Tyrronall
