= Mary B Mitchell (schooner) =

British and later an Irish schooner

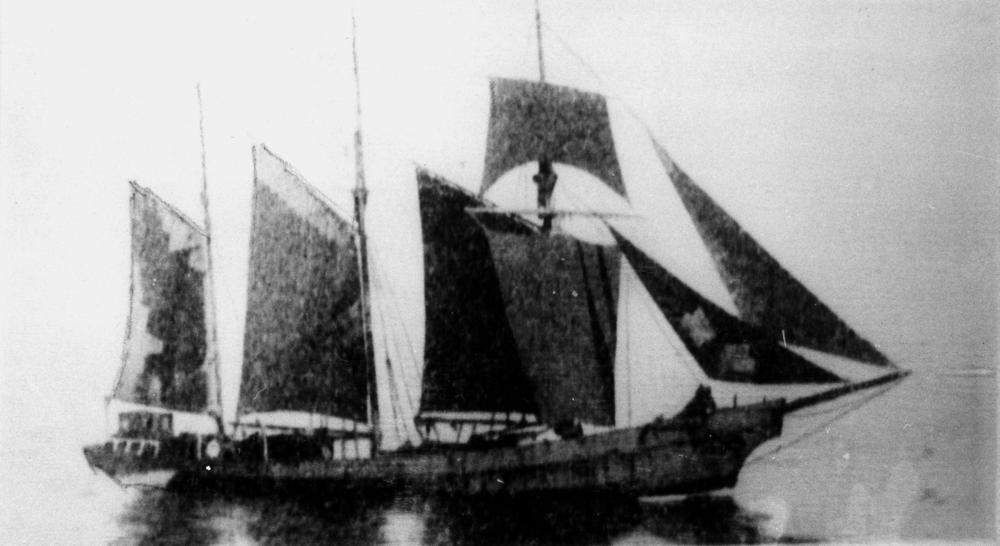

History
- Name: Mary B Mitchell
- Owner: Jones, Preston, Lord Penrhyn, William Thomas, Royal Navy, Job Tyrrell, James Tyrrell
- Port of registry: Anglesey, Dublin
- Builder: Paul Rogers, Carrickfergus
- Launched: 1892
- Commissioned: 1893
- In service: 1893-1944
- Fate: Wrecked 14 December 1944

General characteristics
- Tonnage: 227 gross tons
- Length: 129 ft 7 in (39.50 m)
- Beam: 24 ft 4 in (7.42 m)
- Depth: 10 ft 8 in (3.25 m)
- Propulsion: sail + auxiliary motor
- Armament: 1 ×12 pounder naval gun, 2 × 6 pounder guns, 2 × Lewis guns
- Notes: motor & armaments fitted 1916, disarmed 1919

The Mary B Mitchell was a British and later an Irish schooner, affectionately known as Mary B.. She was a pleasure craft, a war hero, a working schooner, a film star and a transporter of essential cargoes in dangerous waters.

Built in 1892 she carried slate from Wales. In 1912 she was acquired by Lord Penrhyn and converted into a luxury yacht and spent two years cruising the Mediterranean. She resumed carrying cargo; it was china clay on this occasion. In April 1916, she was requisitioned as a Q-ship she featured strongly in reports at the time, however no U-boats were actually damaged. In 1919 she joined the Arklow fleet and for the next dozen years she traded on the Irish Sea. In 1934 she appeared in a film. She featured in a number of films. Mary B. was then retired. At the outbreak of World War II, she was brought out of retirement. Mary B. brought vital food to Britain and vital coal to Ireland. She travelled to Lisbon to collect American cargoes. In December 1944, she was wrecked in a storm.

== Early career ==
Mary B Mitchell was built by Paul Rogers in 1892 at Carrickfergus, as a three-masted topsail schooner. She started her career exporting slate from North Wales to Hamburg. She was owned by Lord Penrhyn and served for a period as a yacht, before being put to work as a coaster, transporting china clay from Cornwall.

== World War I ==
In 1916 three Arklow schooners were requisitioned by the Admiralty to be used as Q-ships, they were: Cymric, Gaelic and Mary B Mitchell. Another Q-ship was the schooner Result which was built in 1893 in the same yard as Mary B Mitchell. Result is now with the Ulster Folk and Transport Museum. They sailed the Southwest Approaches, masquerading as merchantmen, inviting attack by U-boats. Their guns were concealed, when a U-boat approached, a "panic party" would abandon the ship, while the gun crews waited for their target to come into range. The expectation was that the U-boat would approach the apparently abandoned ship and would be surprised and sunk when the guns were revealed and opened fire. Great successes were claimed and medals awarded.

In April 1916 the Mary B. was requisitioned for service as a Q-ship. She was armed with a 12-pounder and two 6-pounder guns as well as two machine guns and small arms. She was commissioned on 5 May 1916 and sailed on her first patrol on 26 June 1916.

On 20 June 1917, she claimed to have sunk two U-boats, SM UC-65 and another U-boat and seen a third. On 3 August 1917 Mitchell reported exchanging fire with SM UC-75. A further engagement on 6 December 1916 was also reported. The Naval Intelligence Department stated that none of Mitchell's encounters resulted in the destruction of any U-boat. Nonetheless, these claims were widely reported in the popular press. and Lawrie was awarded the DSO.

After the war, it was concluded that Q-ships were greatly overrated, diverting skilled seamen from other duties without sinking enough U-boats to justify the strategy. One Arklow schooner requisitioned as a Q-ship, the Cymric, did sink a submarine. Unfortunately it was HMS J6, a "friendly fire" incident.

== Inter-war years ==
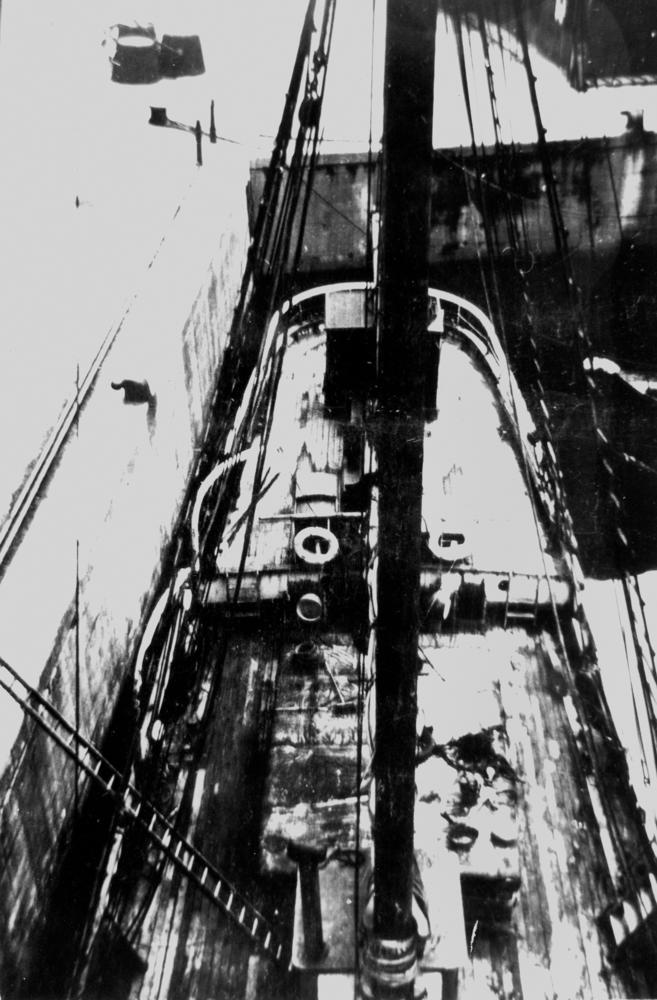
view from fore crosstrees

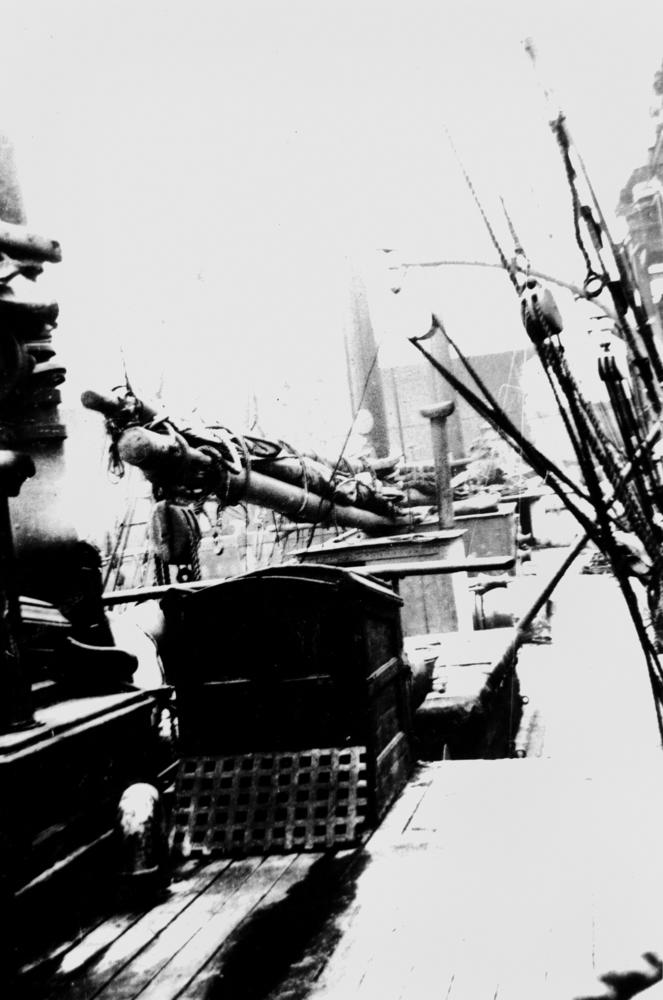
from poop deck. and fore deck ->

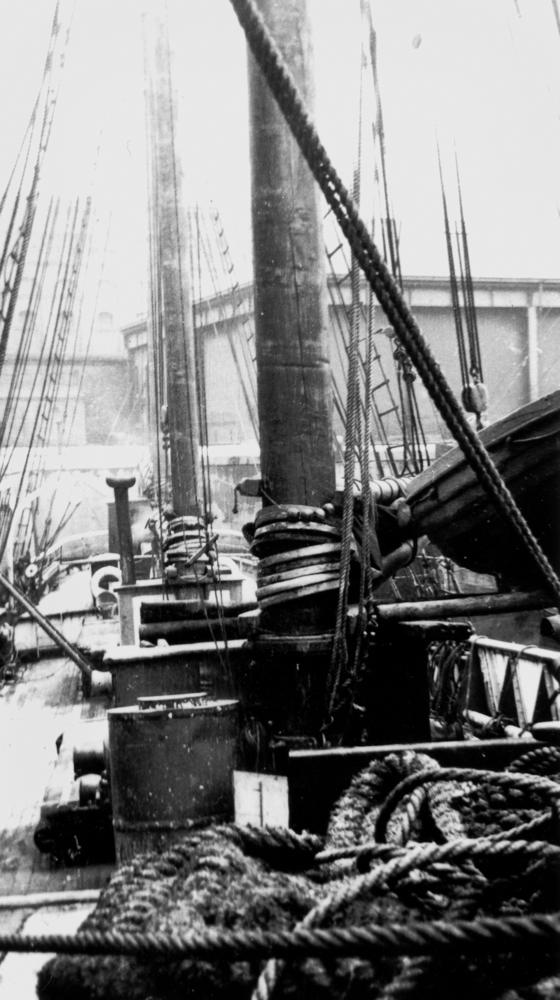
Photos taken on 21 May 1932, in Kingston Dock, Australia, of the Mary B Mitchell with a cargo of china clay (note: Australia is very dubious - she was not known to have sailed further than Newfoundland, Canada, during the 30s)

Mary B Mitchell was "demobbed" on 24 March 1919 and sold to Captain Job Tyrrell of Crinnis Ferrybank, Arklow (note: Job Tyrrell never lived at Crinnis - he lived at Marlborough House; his son, James Tyrrell, bought Crinnis in the 30s) . She was then an "Arklow schooner". A new twin-screw auxiliary diesel engine, known as an "iron topsail", was installed. She spent the next dozen years plying the Irish Sea.

== Film roles ==
In 1934 Mary B Mitchell was chartered by the British International Film Company and featured in a number of films. She was the doomed Mary Celeste in the film The Mystery of the Mary Celeste, which was released in the U.S. as Phantom Ship (1935), one of the early films from Hammer Film Productions. She featured in the 1936 film McGlusky the Sea Rover, which was released in the U.S. as Hell's Cargo.

== World War II ==
At the outbreak of World War II there were only 56 ships on the Irish register, 14 of those were Arklow schooners. These schooners played a vital role in keeping Ireland supplied. Mary B. Mitchell carried food exports and pit props to Wales; returning with cargoes of coal.

In 1943 she went on the hazardous "Lisbon run". American ships would not enter Irish waters; they brought Irish-bound cargoes to Lisbon. Ships like the Mary B. Mitchell had to collect them. Britain had declared the Bay of Biscay to be an "exclusion zone"; their objective was to prevent supplies from reaching Germany, in particular Japanese exports. However Britain needed foreign currency, which she could obtain by exporting coal to Portugal. 'Navicerts' were introduced. Ships with a navicert were permitted safe passage through allied lines. They were to follow the line of longitude at 12° west. Allied convoys to Gibraltar were at least 20° west to avoid the range of German bombers. However, it was difficult for sailing ships to adhere to this straight line, particularly in the stormy conditions, common in the Bay of Biscay.

Mary B. Mitchell made five of these voyages, carrying food to Britain, then British coal to Lisbon, returning with the American cargo to Ireland. Arthur Dowds was captain James Harte was sailing master and Patrick Brennan was first officer. She survived these hazardous journeys. Cymric, another Arklow schooner, which had also been requisitioned as a Q-ship in World War I, was not as fortunate. She vanished with all hands; she may have hit a mine, been torpedoed by a U-boat or bombed by the RAF who were enforcing the blockade of Germany, as was the MV Kerlogue on this same route. Sailing through the Bay of Biscay, Cymric and Mary B Mitchell now neutrals, would have been sailing the same waters as they did as q-ships three decades earlier.

In preparation for D-day, Britain withdrew navicerts in April 1944. At this time there was a severe shortage of fuel in Ireland. Gas rationing was introduced and there was severe curtailment of rail services. The Minister for Supplies instructed the Arklow schooners to cease other imports and only to import coal. The schooners averted a possible great hardship that winter. By the autumn they had imported 40,000 tons of coal, while bringing food supplies to Britain.

Mary B. Mitchell left Dublin for the last time on 13 December 1944; she was bound for Cumberland with a cargo of burnt-ore. She was to return with a cargo of coal. In a storm she was driven onto rocks at the entrance to Kirkcudbright Bay, and lost. Captain Patrick Brennan (the former chief officer) and his crew of eight were taken off by Kirkcudbright lifeboat, all survived. Some items from ship are on display in the Stewartry Museum. Some wreckage remains at the base of the cliff near Senwick Church.

== Commemoration ==
The Mary B Mitchell is commemorated in Bangor, Wales, by a memorial plaque and a bronze weathervane which adorns the city's new shopping precinct. It was designed and made by Ann Catrin Evans and Roger Wyn Evans. The plaque gives a brief account of the ships history, while the weathervane depicts her in silhouette.

== See also ==
- Cymric Arklow Schooner
- MV Murell Arklow ship
- MV Tyrronall Arklow Schooner
- James Postlethwaite Arklow Schooner
- Irish Mercantile Marine during World War II

== Bibliography ==
- Burne, Lester H (2003). Richard Dean Burns (ed.). Chronological History of U.S. Foreign Relations: 1932-1988. Vol. 2. Routledge. ISBN 978-0-415-93916-4.
- Chatterton, E. Keble: Q-Ships and their story. (1922) ISBN (none)
- Forde, Frank (2000) [1981]. The Long Watch. Dublin: New Island Books. ISBN 1-902602-42-0.
- Forde, Frank (1988). Maritime Arklow. Dún Laoghaire: Glendale Press. ISBN 0-907606-51-2.
- Preston, Antony (1982). Submarines. London: Bison Books. ISBN 0-86124-043-X.
- Rees, Jim (1985). Arklow - last stronghold of sail.
- Carson, Ritchie (1985). Q-Ships. ISBN 0-86138-011-8.
