= Brocklebank (tugboat) =

English tugboat

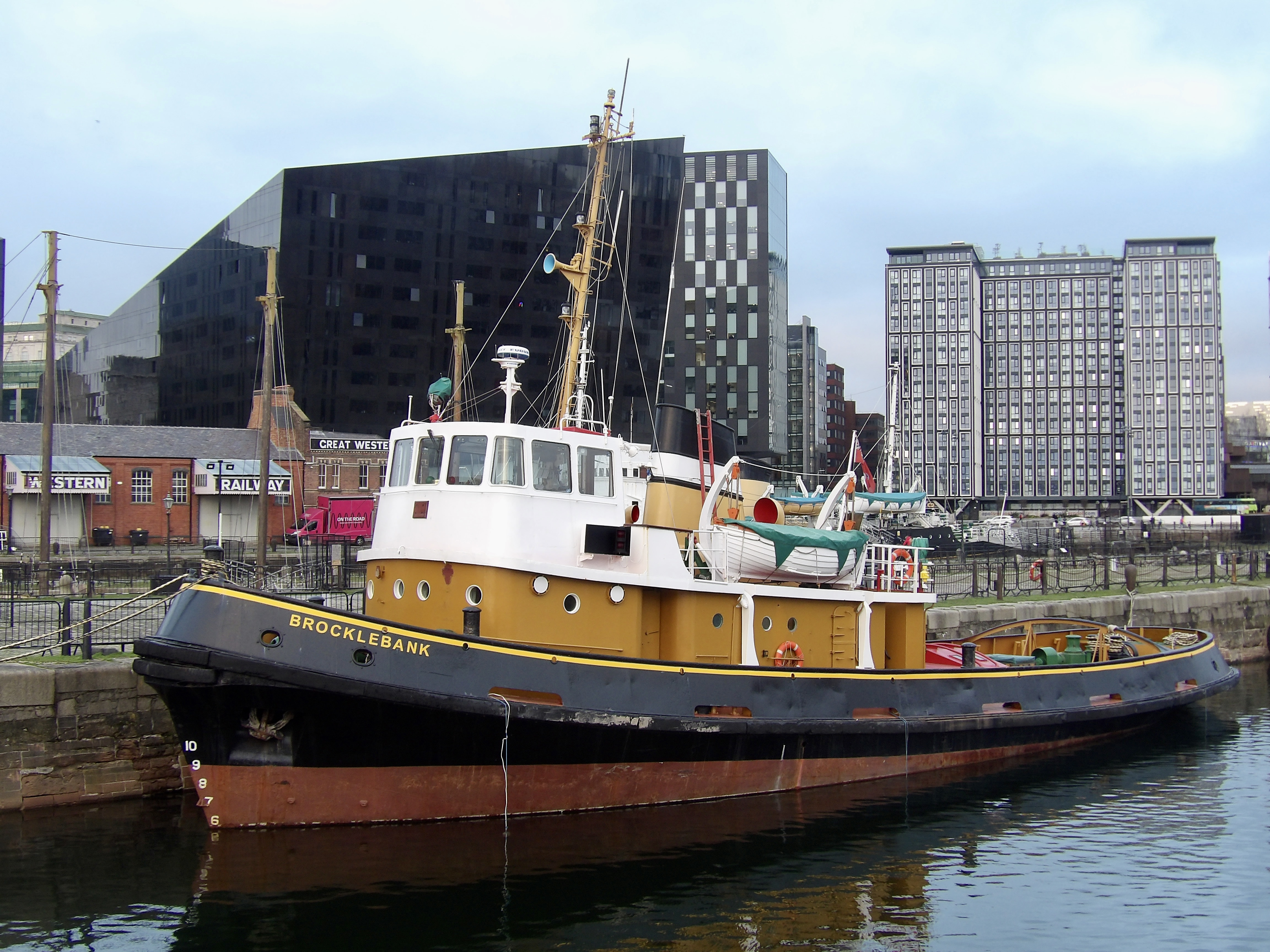
- Pictured in Canning Half Tide Dock, February 16th, 2024.

History

England
- Name: Brocklebank
- Namesake: Brocklebank Dock, Liverpool
- Owner: Alexandra Towing Company (1965-1989); Merseyside Maritime Museum (1989-Present)
- Operator: Brocklebank Preservation Society (1989–Present)
- Port of registry: Liverpool, United Kingdom (1965–Present)
- Builder: W.J. Yarwood & Sons, Northwich
- Yard number: 945
- Acquired: February 1965
- In service: 1965
- Identification: IMO 6420408, MMSI 232003317, Callsign: GQCE
- Fate: Preserved as a museum ship in Liverpool

General characteristics
- Type: Tugboat
- Tonnage: 171.79 gross tons
- Length: 103 feet (31.3 metres) overall, 93 feet (28.3 metres) between perpendiculars
- Beam: 27 feet (8.2 metres)
- Draught: 13 feet (4 metres)
- Decks: 3
- Installed power: 1200hp 2-stroke turbocharged 8 cylinder Crossley diesel engine
- Propulsion: single screw
- Speed: 12 knots
- Crew: 12 (Present)

Brocklebank is a steel-hulled, harbour and coastal tugboat completed in February 1965 by W.J. Yarwood & Sons Ltd in Northwich, Chesire, following an order for eight motor tugboats placed by the Alexandra Towing Company to replace many of their older vessels. Her commercial service predominantly involved ship-handling duties on the River Mersey though she would occasionally provide similar services at ports like Heysham, Larne, and Barrow.

== Conception and construction ==
Prior to Brocklebank's construction, the Alexandra Towing Company were in need of replacements of their older steam tugs. This first newbuilds were two modern tugboats named Talbot and Gower that had engines with two speed gearboxes which could be controlled from the bridge, as well as ducted variable pitch propellers. These innovations did not turn out to be as effective as hoped, as the engine control system experienced frequent failure and the Kort nozzles (ducted propellers) were consistently fouled by debris. Therefore, Alexandra Towing made the decision to revert to a more traditional design with their next group of newbuilds, which included Brocklebank. The lack of modern systems allowed for them to be cheaper, and they would not require additional crew training for any of the systems.

Named after the Liverpool dock of the same name, Brocklebank (yard number 945), the third tugboat of Alexandra ownership to bear that name, was launched sideways in 1964 on the banks of the River Weaver, and completed in February 1965. She is outfitted with a 1200 horsepower two-stroke turbocharged eight cylinder Crossley diesel engine that drives a single propeller which allows her to travel up to 12 knots at full power, as well as exert a pulling force of up to 17.4 tonnes.

Her accommodation sits across two decks in the forward section of the ship. The captain and chief engineers cabins sit directly beneath the heated wheelhouse, with two cabins on the deck below designated for a second engineer and mate. Forward of this is the largest cabin, built originally with four bunks for the deckhands. The cabins have since gained additional space to accommodate up to 12 crew. The main deck is home to a galley and mess room with two bathrooms either side that each have a shower.

== Commercial service (1965-1989) ==
Brocklebank's commercial service spanned across 25 years, assisting larger ships into, throughout, and out of the docks along the River Mersey alongside her fleetmates. For example, in August 1965 she towed the County-class destroyer HMS Kent through Langton Lock. She provided service at other ports across the UK, partaking in ship-handling work following ship launches in Heysham, Larne, and Barrow.

During this time, she would escort the Royal Yacht Britannia on the river in 1982 whilst Queen Elizabeth II was visiting Liverpool.

She was also involved in the construction of Seaforth Dock in Liverpool, by manner of bringing hopper barges loaded with stone at Dinmore Quarry, Anglesey, to the site.

In 1989, as the merchant ships which traded on the River Mersey continued to become larger and require more powerful tugboats to be able to reliably manoeveur them, tugboats such as Brocklebank became obsolete and thus she was retired from commercial service and put up for sale.

== Preservation (1989-Present) ==
Brocklebank was purchased in 1989 by the Merseyside Maritime Museum who by then had already acquired the likes of the Edmund Gardner and the De Wadden, making an effort to preserve motor vessels as opposed to steamships or sailing vessels. Brocklebank was subsequently chartered to the MV Wincham Preservation Society, a volunteer group of seafarers formed by the Friends of the Merseyside Maritime Museum who themselves already owned the 1948-built MV Wincham. This was to ensure she would be regularly maintained and operated. Her first captain during this time was John Temple, a former Mersey pilot. Since September 2nd, 2017, this preservation society has been named the Brocklebank Preservation Society, to reflect the fact that the Wincham no longer exists.

The following years saw much action for the Brocklebank, as she attended the 1992 Brest European Congress and Maritime Festival, as well as joining the 1994 D-Day celebrations at Spithead and Honfleur respectively, a voyage with a total length of 500 miles, where she received the praise of Captain Robin Woodall, who was the captain of the QE2 at the time. In 2005, she took part in the International Trafalgar Fleet Review.The ship has received much in terms of new equipment, with new radar, GPS, AIS, and satellite compass systems being installed in the ship during the 2010s and 2020s. Her wooden lifeboat has since been put out of action and replaced by liferaft and dinghy, though it still remains aboard. Brocklebank is the only seaworthy vessel owned by a British museum, and she sails frequently to maritime festivals across the UK and Ireland, having visited Bristol, Arklow, Whitehaven, Lancaster, Barrow, Fleetwood, Leith, Greenock, Dublin, Douglas, Port Erin, and Portsmouth. She has also played a role in the Mersey River Festival where the Royal Marines descended from a helicopter to her aft deck.

A hull inspection performed circa 2025 revealed she was laden with a type of corrosion known as pitting, where small pits form across the metal that can eventually cause heavy structural damage if not treated. The Merseyside Maritime Museum would therefore make use of a £200,000 investment from the Public Bodies Infrastructure Fund meant for the conservation of the Brocklebank and the Edmund Gardner to fund a drydocking at Cammell Laird for necessary work beneath her waterline. This involved both a deep clean and the application of a repair coating on the pitting to ensure that the corrosion did not continue, extending the vessel's seaworthiness for at least another decade.
