= James Postlethwaite =

Irish schooner

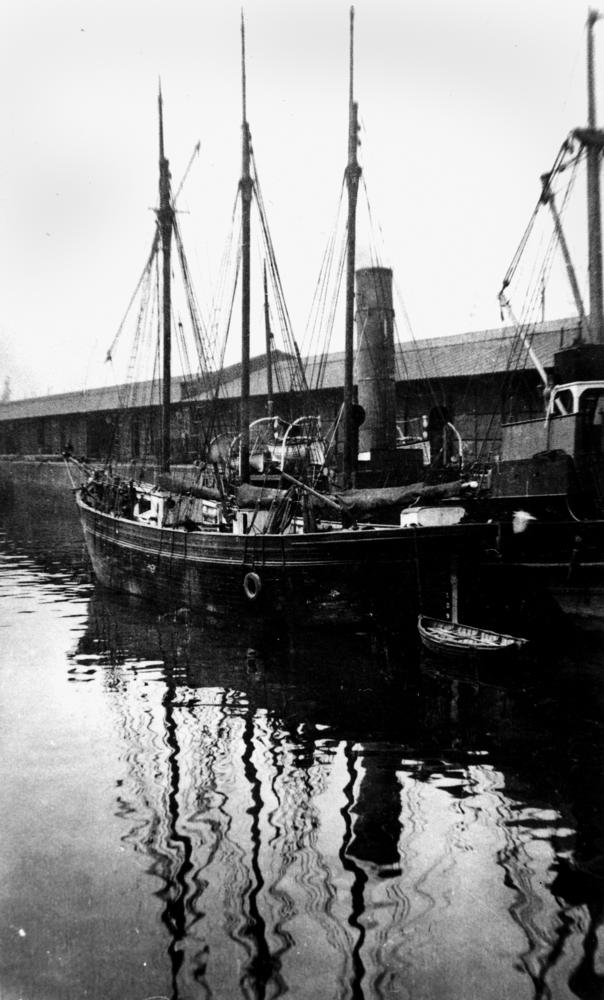

History

Ireland
- Name: James Postlethwaite
- Owner: Captain Ned Hall of Arklow
- Builder: William Ashburner and Son
- Launched: 1881
- Acquired: 1909
- Fate: Damaged in a storm, and burnt

General characteristics
- Class & type: Iron Schooner; 12A1
- Tonnage: 134
- Length: 99.7 ft (30.4 m)
- Beam: 23 ft (7.0 m)
- Draught: 10 ft 1 in (3.07 m)
- Propulsion: Sail, Auxiliary motor fitted later
- Sail plan: Three masted, fore-and-aft with topsails

James Postlethwaite was a schooner, launched in 1881. She operated out of Arklow after 1909. She was in Hamburg on the day that Britain entered the First World War with its declaration of war against Germany. Her crew was imprisoned and she was impounded and used as a barge to carry munitions.

After the war, in difficult economic conditions, she resumed trading. In 1929, a collier collided with, and sunk, her; however she was successfully salvaged.

During the Second World War she supplied Irish agricultural products to Britain, and brought coal to Ireland. In 1952 she featured in the film Moby Dick. While still configured as a whaler she was damaged, beyond repair, by a storm.

== Early career ==
James Postlethwaite was built by William Ashburner and Son at Barrow and was launched on 11 August 1881. She was the second-last schooner built by William Ashburner and Son at Barrow. William Ashburner died six days after James Postlethwaite was launched. (Note: The last schooner built at Barrow was J & M Garratt in April 1884) James Postlethwaite and ME Johnson were identical, having been built to the same plans, in the same yard. James Postlethwaite was named after James Postlethwaite of Gleaston. (Note: James Postlethwaite was named after James Postlethwaite, who died c 1880, from Gleaston of the shipbuilding firm of Perry & Oistlethwaite in Ulverston.) The Ashburners built the ships for their own fleet: Thomas Ashburner & Co. Captain Robert Roskell was the first master of James Postlethwaite. James Postlethwaite and ME Johnson were tramp coasters. (Note: As were most of the Arklow fleet, dependent on irregular cargoes) They served the ports of Britain and the east coast of Ireland as well as French and Belgian channel ports; but never ventured further.

The Ashburner fleet was sold by auction in 1909. Arklow ship-owners were very interested. Captain Ned Hall bought James Postlethwaite for £995. ME Johnson was bought for £1110 by an Arklow consortium led by Captain Frank Tyrrell. (Note: ME Johnson was bought for £1110 by an Arklow consortium led by Captain Frank Tyrrell; it included and Captain Thomas Price, and members of the Kearon family.) William Ashburner was the last to be auctioned, she was older, was built in 1876, yet went for a higher price than expected. (Note: William Ashburner was sold for a high price. The Arklow bidders dropped out and she was sold to the Bennetts of Connah Quay, in Wales for £1040. In 1920 the Bennetts sold her to Arklow. The under bidder was Philip Kelly Harris, a shipbuilder, whose company became Appledore Shipbuilders . Harris then engaged Richard Ashburner to design a similar schooner, which he built in his own shipyard. He named her PT Harris.) In time, William Ashburner would join the Arklow fleet.

== First World War ==
Under Captain Ned Hall, (Note: Captain Edward Nealon Hall, Born in Arklow 3 January 1877) James Postlethwaite frequented continental ports. On 28 July 1914, the day Britain declared war on Germany, James Postlethwaite was in Hamburg. The ship was seized and the crew imprisoned. There were five other Irish ships of the Palgrave-Murphy Line in the port on that day. Some should have left, but the German port authorities used various excuses to delay their departure. They were City of Berlin, City of Cadiz, City of Belfast, City of Hamburg and City of Munich. The ships were expropriated and their crews imprisoned. The City of Berlin was sunk as a blockship.

Other Arklow ships were lost, such as Robert Tyrrell's Vindex which was abandoned by her crew as the Germans overran Antwerp. On the other side, William Hall's Barkdale was detained by the Royal Navy. She was to deliver coal to Guaymas, Mexico. The coal was suspected of being destined for German surface raiders.

German ships in British ports were also seized and most were auctioned off. Three German schooners joined the Arklow fleet. Captain George Tyrrell bought Erica for £1880, Captain Gregory bought Neptun for £370 and renamed her Kings Hill while Captain Gregory bought Johanna for £1510 and renamed her Shelton Abbey. While renaming ships was common elsewhere, it was very unusual in Arklow. Erica was sunk by the U-boat U-110 on 8 February 1918 off Bardsey Island.

The Germans cut down James Postlethwaite's masts, converting her into a barge. She was used to carry ammunition on the Elbe.

== Ruhleben internment camp ==
The crews were imprisoned first in Hamburg and then transferred to Ruhleben internment camp on a racecourse at Spandau near Berlin. Conditions were congested, insanitary, cold and dark.

When Captain Tyndall of City of Belfast fell ill, Captain Hall of James Postlethwaite cared for both crews. (Note: The camp had "captains" (not sea captains) where the captain would take responsibility for a number of prisoners and could make representations on their behalf to the prison authorities) The City of Belfast had crew from Arklow and Rush, under Captain George Tyndall. Other Arklow seamen from the Wilson Line also associated with them, (Note: John Kearney, John Graham and John Heaney) and there were 23 others from Rush. (Note: David Snook, assistant research officer with the Maritime Institute of Ireland identified the 23 prisoners from Rush, his work was exhibited in the Dundalk County Museum as "Faces from the Past", see) There were over 4,000 prisoners in Ruhleben, all were civilians. A third of them were seamen. The prisoners were allowed to administer their own affairs. Sporting, cultural and educational groups developed. The 'Ruhleben Irish Players' staged plays by Synge and Shaw while Shakespeare's plays were performed by the 'Ruhleban Dramatic Society'. The prison authorities banned Shaw's Arms and the Man, declaring "militaristic plays will not be tolerated". (Note: The play is a satire, it could not be described as "militaristic"). The 'Ruhleben Irish Players' included not just the seamen but other Irish civilians, such as R. M. Smyllie. (Note: Smyllie would later edit The Irish Times) There were classes in navigation. A pupil from Dublin, of the City of Belfast obtained his extra-masters certificate and went on to beharbour master of Adelaide. (Note: Christopher Kean of Strand Road, Skerries, Dublin)

There were efforts to arrange a prisoner exchange by Captain Donelan Chief Whip of the Irish Party, John T. Donovan and other MPs from the Home Rule Party and Irish Peers, such as, Lord Charles Beresford, (Note: Beresford feared that the continuous detention of seamen would result in madness) with little success. 55 prisoners were released for Christmas 1915, including 2 from Arklow. (Note: One of them, Joseph Kane of the City of Munich, went back to sea on SS Ottokar and was lost when she was sunk on 11 December 1917)

On 10 October 1918, a month before the armistice, a large group of prisoners, including most of the Irish, were released. This was the day that RMS Leinster was torpedoed and sunk by UB-123 off Dublin with the loss of over 500 lives – the greatest single loss of life in the Irish Sea. Many of the prisoners were ill. Captain George Tyndall of the City of Belfast died ten days after his release.

== Post First World War ==
After the war, James Postlethwaite was returned to Captain Ed Hall. She was initially towed to South Shields for refitting as new masts were required, then to Arklow and rerigged. She resumed trading under Captain Hall, on a route from Shields to St. Valery. By now sail was significantly less economic than motor vessels, but with the mini-boom which followed the war, sailing ships could still obtain cargoes. In Ireland, the internal road and rail networks had been neglected. It was often cheaper to send goods by sea rather than by road or rail. (Note: Freight from Arklow to Dublin by sea was 20% cheaper than by rail.) For some years, James Postlethwaite secured such cargoes. In 1926 an auxiliary engine was installed in James Postlethwaite. There was a good trade in sending wooden pit props to Wales. The miners strike of 1926 caused many schooners to be laid-up. Captain Ned Hall retired in 1926. In April 1929 Captain William Hagan (Note: Captain William Hagan, born 1884, 17 Fair Green, Arklow, died August 1935) purchased shares in James Postlethwaite and took command.

On the night of 11 May 1929 James Postlethwaite was at anchor in Carlingford Lough. She was rammed by the steam collier JJ Monks and sunk. Captain William Hagan and the crew were rescued by the collier. James Postlethwaite was salvaged and repaired.

Sailing ships became less popular in busy ports. Motor ships were easier to manoeuvre and faster to discharge and load. James Postlethwaite was relegated to the smaller ports, carrying less valuable cargoes such as kelp from Kilrush to Bowling. It was difficult to compete with motor vessels. The Anglo-Irish Trade War reduced the volume of cargoes which could be carried. Competition became impossible when Dutch coasters arrived. They were subsidised by the Dutch government. The Arklow schooners could no longer secure cargoes, they were tied up along the Avoca River, where they were left to decay.

== Second World War ==
At the outbreak of the Second World War, known as "The Emergency" (Note: "The Emergency" was an official euphemism used by the Irish Government to refer to the Second World War.) Ireland declared neutrality and became isolated as never before. Shipping had been neglected since the Irish War of Independence. Foreign ships, on which Ireland's trade had hitherto depended, were less available. In his Saint Patrick's Day address in 1940, Taoiseach (Prime Minister) Éamon de Valera lamented:

"No country had ever been more effectively blockaded because of the activities of belligerents and our lack of ships..."

Éamon de Valera advocated self-sufficiency and discouraged International trade, saying: "It was an important status symbol in the modern world for a country to produce her own goods and be self-sufficient." At the end of the civil war in 1923, the merchant fleet consisted of 127 ships. At the start of World War II in 1939, the fleet numbered only 56 ships. That 56 included the sailing ships taken out of retirement. Only 5% of imports were carried on Irish flagged vessels.

Ireland was a net food exporter. The excess was shipped to Britain. It was sailing ships, such as James Postlethwaite who had long past their retirement which ensured that Irish agricultural exports reached Britain, and that British coal arrived in Ireland. Sailing ships, which had been left to rot, were refitted out and once more took to the seas. One, the Arklow schooner Antelope, had been tied up for seven years. Brooklands of Cork was built in 1859. Some were beyond salvage. The Avoca river was cleared of old decayed, derelicts, (Note: Uncle Ned (1867), K.T. (1899), Tarragona (1863), Ellen (1864)) They were broken up for fire-wood. 14 Arklow schooners resumed service under the tricolour, (Note: Agnes Craig (1884), Antelope (1885), Cymric (1893), de Wadden (1917), Gaelic (1898), Happy Harry (1894), Harvest King (1879), Invermore (1821), JT&S (1918), James Postlethwaite (1881), Mary B Mitchell (1892), ME Johnson (1879), Venturer (1920) Windermere (1890)) while one flew the Red Ensign. (Note: William Ashburner (1876))

== Final career ==
In 1945 she was given a new 120hp diesel engine; her masts were more drastically reduced and she was now little more than a motorship. At the end of the war, the Dutch motor vessels returned, and sail could not economically compete. By 1950 Arklow ship-owners had acquired modern motor ships. Captain James Tyrrell purchased Halronell. Captain Victor Hall acquired Kilbride. James Postlethwaite made her last visit to Barrow in 1952 and soon after she was laid up at Arklow, the schooner trade by then being virtually defunct.

James Postlethwaite had one last role to play. The Arklow schooners James Postlethwaite and Harvest King starred in the film Moby Dick. In 1954 James Postlethwaite was towed by MV George Emelie to Youghal, where John Huston was filming "Moby Dick". She was outfitted as a whaler. James Postlethwaite played the part of Devil-Dam, while Harvest King was Tit-Bit and Pequod was the schooner Ryelands. (Note: The schooner Ryelands was built by Nicholson & Marsh at Glasson Dock and on 11 January 1887. Ryelands spent her final years as a tourist attraction in Scarborough and in Morecambe. In 1972 she caught fire and was totally destroyed.)

In November a gale smashed James Postlethwaite into the quay at Youghal, causing irreparable damage. She was beached and remained derelict until she was finally set on fire on 7 October 1957.

The wheel of the James Postlethwaite was salvaged and is now on display at the Moby Dick Inn.

== See also ==
- Cymric Arklow Schooner
- Mary B Mitchell Arklow Schooner
- MV Murell Arklow ship
- MV Tyrronall Arklow Schooner

== Bibliography ==
- deCourcy Ireland, John (1986). Ireland and the Irish in Maritime History. DúnLaoghaire: Glendale Press. ISBN 0-907606-28-8.
- Dwyer, T Ryle (1982). De Valera's Finest Hour. Cork: Mercier Press. ISBN 0-85342-675-9.
- Fenton, Roy S (1997). Mersey Rovers: the coastal tramp ship owners of Liverpool and the Mersey. World Ship Society. ISBN 978-0-905617-84-8.
- Ferriter, Diarmaid (2006). What If? Alternative Views of Twentieth-Century Ireland. Gill & Macmillan. ISBN 978-0-7171-3990-3.
- Forde, Frank (2000) [1981]. The Long Watch. New Island Books. ISBN 1-902602-42-0.
- Forde, Frank (1988). Maritime Arklow. Dún Laoghaire: Glendale Press. ISBN 0-907606-51-2.
- Greenhill, Basil (1988). The merchant schooners. Naval Institute Press. ISBN 0-87021-427-6.
- Latham, Tim (1991). The Ashburner schooners. Ready Rhino. ISBN 0-9516792-0-1.
- McIvor, Aidan (1994). A History of the Irish Naval Service. Dublin: Irish Academic Press. ISBN 0-7165-2523-2.
- Jim Rees, Liam Charlton (1986). Arklow – last stronghold of sail (second ed.). Arklow Historical Society.
- Smith, Cornelius (2004). The Shipping Murphys. Blackrock, Dublin: Albany Press. ISBN 0-9540340-1-5.
