= Canning Dock =

Dock in Liverpool, England

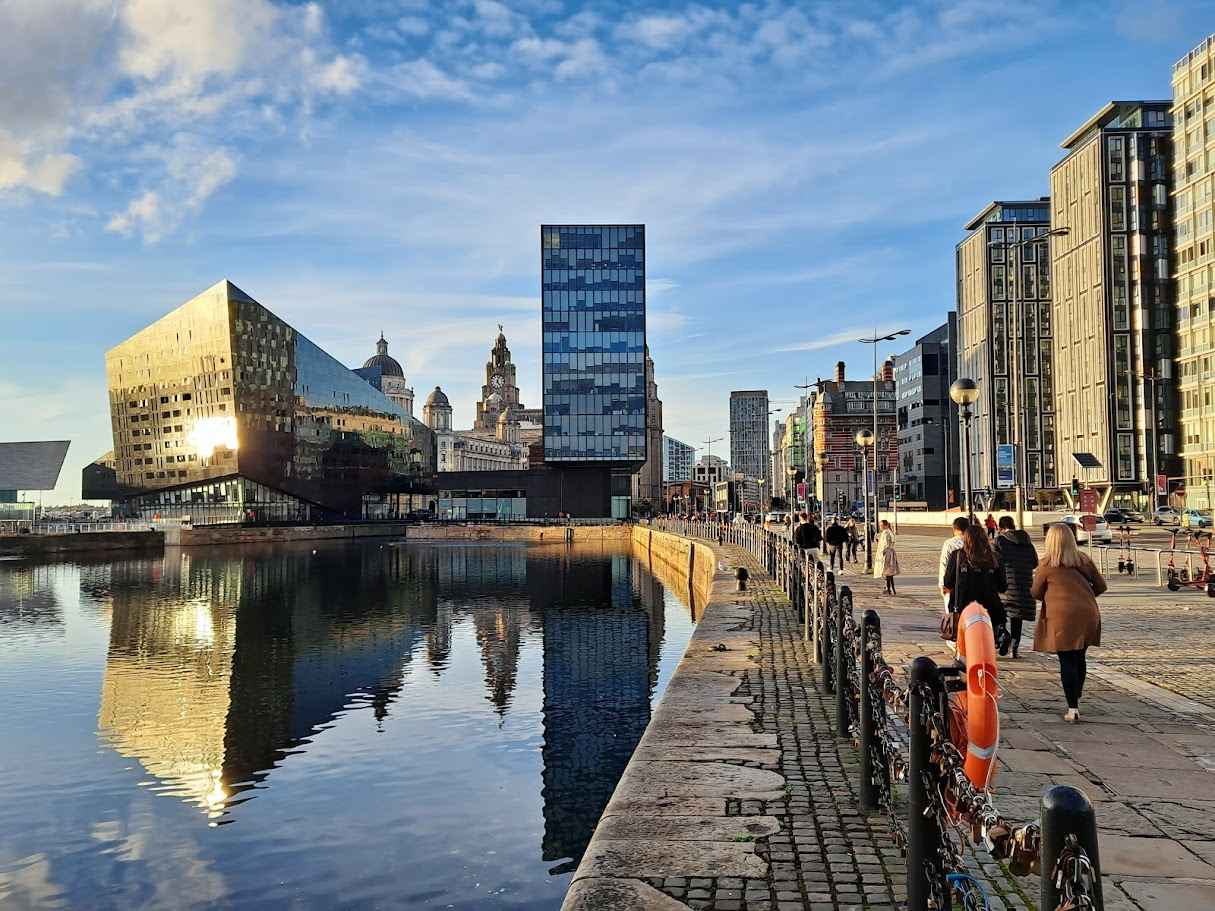
- Canning Dock from the eastern side, looking towards the Pier Head

Location
- Location: Liverpool, United Kingdom
- Coordinates: 53.4026°N 2.9918°W
- OS grid: SJ341899

Details
- Owner: Canal & River Trust
- Opened: 1737; 288 years ago
- Type: Wet dock
- Joins: Salthouse Dock; Canning Half Tide Dock; Liverpool Canal Link to Prince's Dock
- Area: 4 acres (1.6 ha), 376 sq yd (314 m^{2})
- Width at entrance: 45 ft (14 m)
- Quay length: 585 yd (535 m)

Canning Dock on the River Mersey is part of the Port of Liverpool in northern England. The dock is in the southern dock system, connected to Salthouse Dock to the south and with access to the river via the Canning Half Tide Dock to the west. The Canning Graving Docks are accessed from the dock.

== History ==
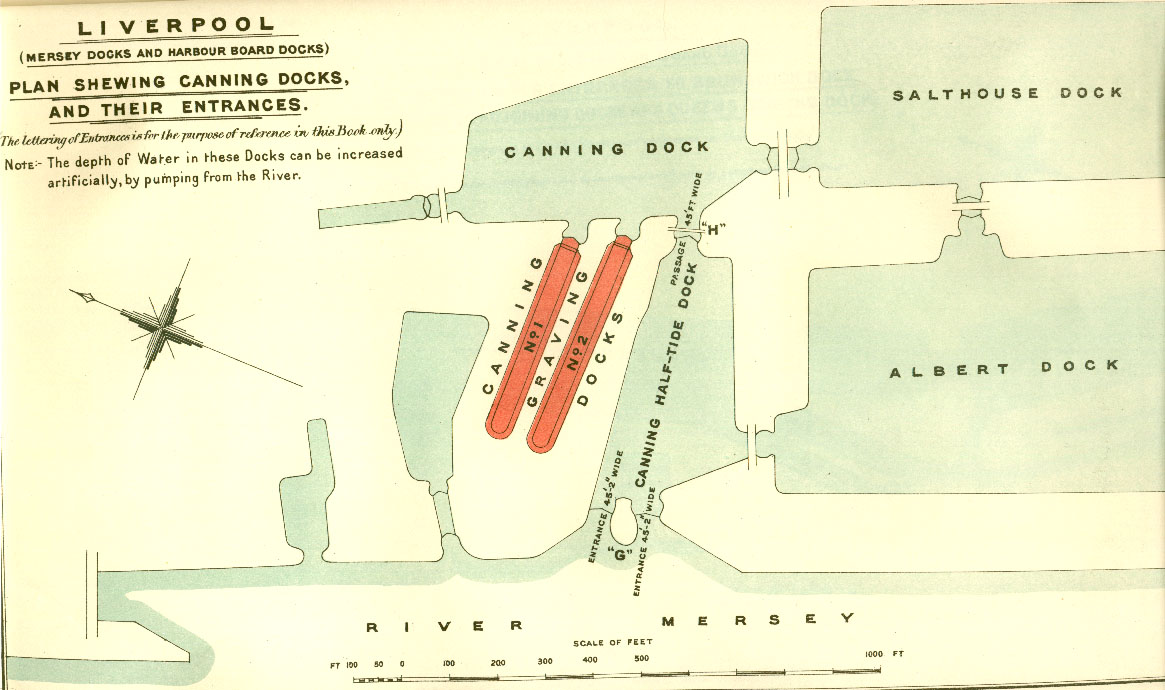
Liverpool docks, 1909; from the Dock Book, June 1909, published by the British Admiralty

Canning Dock was opened in 1737 as the Dry Dock, a protected tidal basin providing an entrance to Old Dock. Having been subsequently enclosed as a wet dock three years earlier, in 1832 it was officially named after the Liverpool MP George Canning. To the east is the site of Old Dock, built in 1709, which was the world's first enclosed commercial dock. Canning Dock would have initially served ships involved in the trans-Atlantic slave trade.

Access to the northern half of the dock system was via George's Dock, George's Basin and into Prince's Dock. George's Basin was filled in 1874. George's Dock was filled in 1899, and its site is now the Pier Head.

Along with the Albert Dock and others in the immediate vicinity, Canning Dock was abandoned as a commercial shipping facility in 1972 due to falling traffic and the rising cost of dredging.

=== Graving docks ===
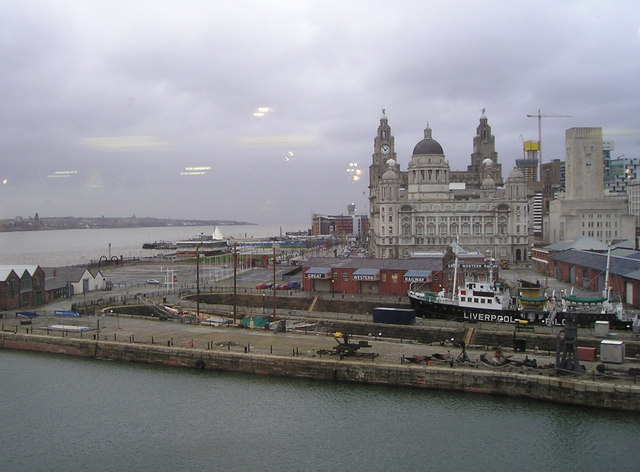
The graving docks, across the half tide dock

Adjoining the dock basin are two dry graving dock built by Henry Berry between 1765 and 1769. They were lengthened and deepened by Jesse Hartley in the 1840s. In the 1980s the graving docks became part of the Merseyside Maritime Museum and home to two of the museum's ships, the pilot cutter Edmund Gardner and the schooner De Wadden.

== Redevelopment ==
Canning Dock was restored from 1983, providing access to the Canning Graving Docks, which are part of the Merseyside Maritime Museum.

By March 2009 work was completed on a £22 million extension of the Leeds and Liverpool Canal, providing a further 1.4 mi (2.3 km) of navigable waterway.

From Princes Dock, the extension passes the Pier Head and terminates at Canning Dock. The extension includes a small canal basin at Mann Island near Pier Head, and a new lock providing access to Canning Dock.
