= Cymric (schooner) =

British and Irish schooner

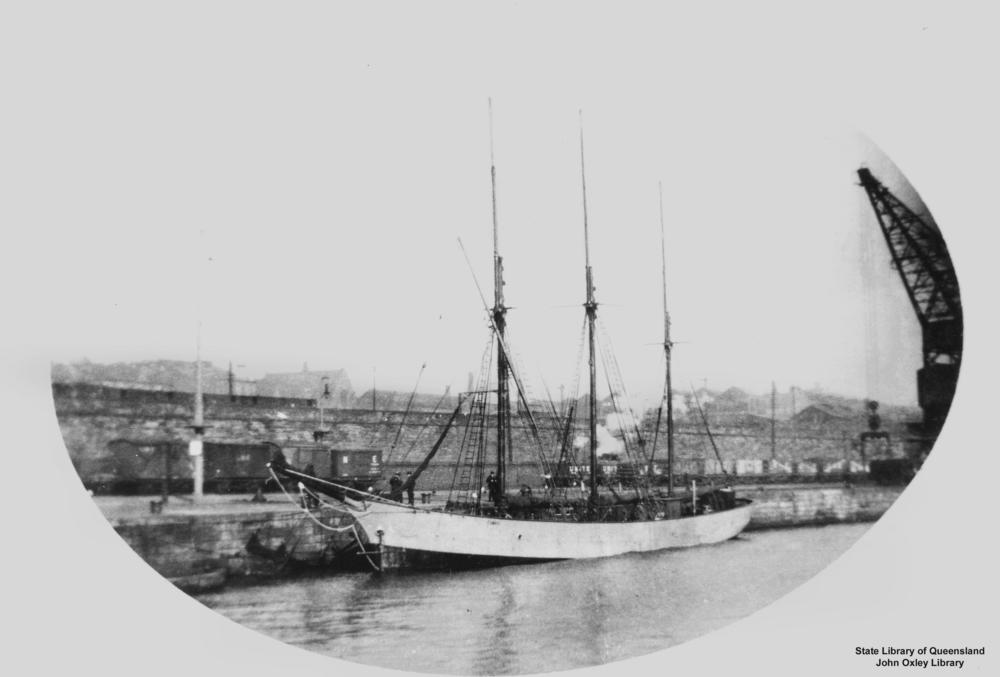
- Cymric

History

United Kingdom
- Name: Cymric
- Builder: William Thomas and Sons
- Launched: 1893

Ireland
- Owner: Captain Richard Hall of Arklow
- Acquired: 1906

United Kingdom
- Acquired: c.1915

Ireland
- Owner: Halls of Arklow
- Acquired: c.1919
- Fate: Vanished with all hands in 1944 during World War II

General characteristics
- Class & type: Iron barquentine
- Tonnage: 228 grt
- Length: 123 ft (37 m)
- Beam: 24 ft (7.3 m)
- Draught: 10 ft 8 in (3.25 m)
- Propulsion: Sail, Auxiliary motor fitted in World War I
- Sail plan: Three masted

Cymric was a British and Irish schooner, built in 1893. She joined the South American trade in the fleet of Arklow, Ireland, in 1906. She served as a British Q-ship during the First World War; she failed to sink any German U-boats, but did sink a British submarine in error.

After the war, she returned to the British and, later, the Irish merchant service. In Ringsend, Ireland, she collided with a tram, her bowsprit smashing through the tram's windows. In 1944, during the Second World War, sailing as a neutral, she vanished without trace with the loss of eleven lives.

== Arklow schooners ==
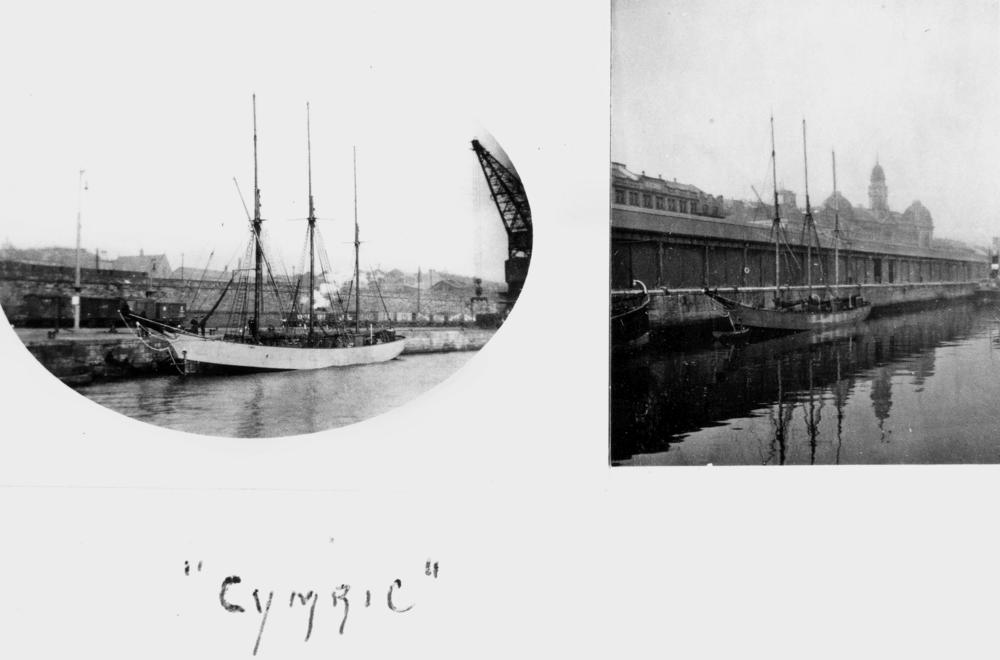
Photographs of Cymric held in the John Oxley Library

Arklow, Ireland, has a long history of ship-owning. According to local tradition, it extends back to the export of tin and copper by the Phoenicians. The fleet was locally owned, managed, mastered and manned. Each ship was an individual enterprise, each divided into 64 shares. A captain would probably have a 25% interest in his ship: that is 16 shares. The owner listed in documents was the managing owner, not necessarily the beneficial owner. The Arklow shipowners cooperated: they established their own mutual insurance company. A century ago, ownership became concentrated. In 1966 Tyrrell and Hall formed an umbrella company to operate their ships: Arklow Shipping. By November 2011 they had a modern fleet of about 45 ships.

== Early career ==
Two Arklow schooners, Cymric and Gaelic, were built by William Thomas in Amlwch. Cymric was launched in March 1893. Gaelic was launched in March 1898. They were built as barquentines, (Note: They were built as barquentines; that is there were square sails on the fore-mast and fore-and-aft sails on the other two masts.) In Arklow, the preferred sail configuration was the double top sailed schooner. In 1906, Cymric joined the Arklow fleet and was rigged as a schooner. (Note: A schooner has fore-and-aft sails on all masts, as depicted in the painting of Cymric on this page)

Cymric was an iron schooner. She had a shallow draught of only 10.8 feet, three wooden masts, no poop deck, a flaring bow, a round counter-stern and very square yards on her fore mast. She was built by the Thomas yard for their own fleet. Her early days, under Captain Robert Jones, were spent in the South American trade running from Runcorn to Gibraltar and on to the Rio Grande, docking at the Brazilian port of Porto Alegre. In 1906 she was sold to Captain Richard Hall of Arklow.

In the new century, 1900, there was an expansion in the Arklow fleet, as larger iron-hulled schooners were purchased. Job Tyrrell purchased Detlef Wagner and Maggie Williams, while Job Hall acquired Patrician, Celtic and Cymric. In the main, all of these ships engaged in the Spanish wine trade until Detlef Wagner was sunk by UC-72 on 28 May 1917

== First World War ==
Three Arklow schooners were requisitioned by the Admiralty to be used as Q-ships, they were: Cymric, Gaelic and Mary B Mitchell. They sailed the Southwest Approaches, masquerading as merchantmen, inviting attack by U-boats. Their guns were concealed, when a U-boat approached, a "panic party" would abandon the ship, while the gun crews waited for their target to come into range. The expectation was that the U-boat would approach the apparently abandoned ship and would be surprised and sunk when the guns were revealed and opened fire. Great successes were claimed and medals awarded. Mary B Mitchell claimed to have sunk two U-boats in the same day.

Post-war analysis did not confirm these claims. After the war, it was concluded that Q-ships were greatly over-rated, diverting skilled seamen from other duties without sinking enough U-boats to justify the strategy.

Cymric sank a submarine in what is now called 'friendly fire'. On 15 October 1918, HMS J6, a J-class submarine, was on the surface outside her base, Blythe, when she was spotted by Cymric which mistook her 'J6' marking for 'U6'. Cymric opened fire, J6 tried to signal, but the signalman was killed. J6 fled into a fog bank, but Cymric located J6 again, and sank her, with the loss of 14 lives. An order under the Official Secrets Act prohibited mention of this incident until 1969.

== Between the wars ==
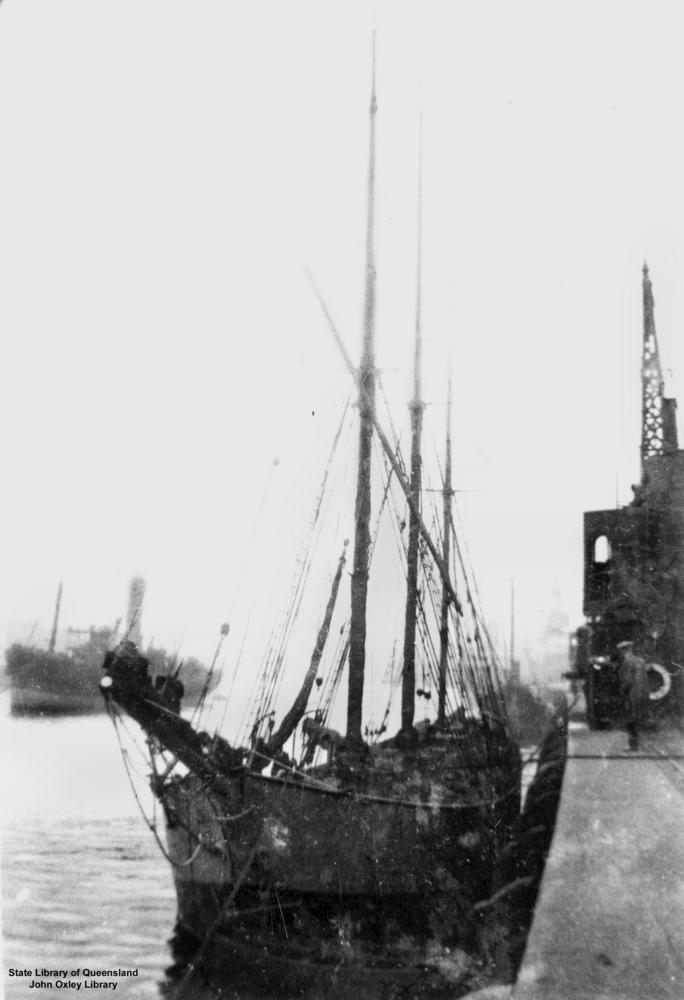
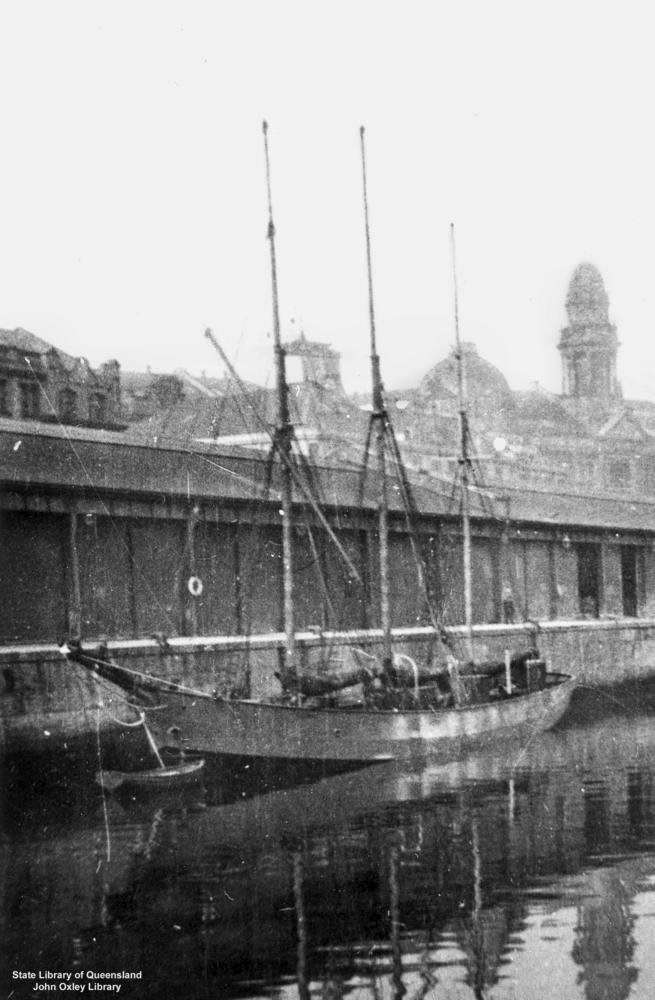
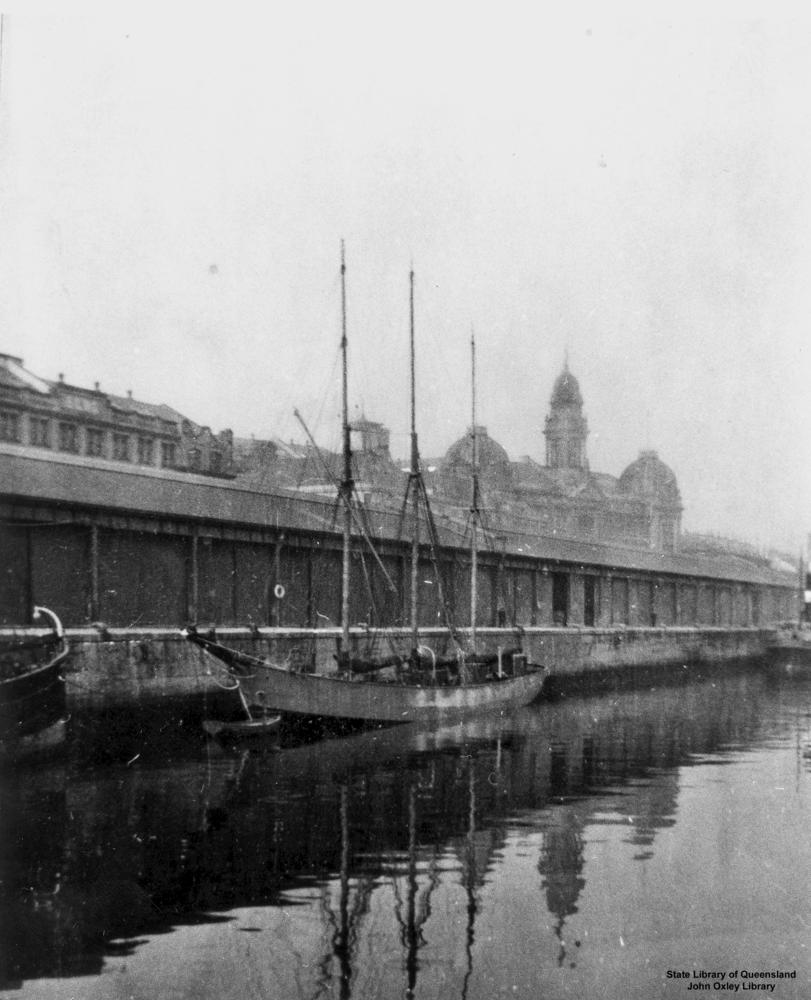
Photos of Cymric taken on 25 September 1930, in Australia

After the war, she was disarmed and returned to Halls of Arklow. The auxiliary engine remained. By now large steamers were more profitable than sailing ships for ocean voyages. However, within Ireland transport was becoming more difficult. The neglect of the networks during World War I was compounded by destruction during the war of independence and the subsequent civil war. It was more cost-effective to transport goods by sea around the coast rather than using internal road or rail. Cymric had a new career: transporting malt from ports such as Ballinacurra, New Ross and Wexford to Dublin.

It was on one of these voyages that she collided with a tram. Cymric was waiting for Mac Machon Bridge, a bascule bridge, at the entrance to the Inner Basin of the Grand Canal Dock 53.342369°N 6.23795°W to open, when a gust of wind propelled her towards the bridge. (Note: The bridge is now a fixed bridge, originally called Victoria Bridge.) and her bowsprit speared tram number 233. There are many versions of this story. Details differ, including the date, which varies from 12 February 1927 or 1928 to 21 December 1943 Research by Dr Edward Bourke established that there were two separate incidents: on Tuesday 29 November 1921, Cymric did, indeed, collide with a tram. On 21 December 1943, Happy Harry, a different Arklow schooner, collided with the same bridge. No one was hurt in either incident.

On 22 August 1922, Cymric struck the Brandy Rocks and was beached at Kilmore, County Wexford. She was refloated on 24 August 1922.

Cymric was witness to a sad event that would change the way lighthouses and lightships are administered in Ireland. The general lighthouse authority for Ireland, the Commissioners of Irish Lights, had removed a lightship from the Arklow Bank and replaced it with an unlit buoy. On 19 February 1931, the Julia en route from Glasgow to Newhaven, grounded on the Arklow Bank and was wrecked with the loss of the crew of five, two of whom were from Arklow. Cymric, with her shallow draught, discovered the tragedy two days later. At the time, the Commissioners of Irish Lights, which was an all-island body, continued to report to the UK Board of Trade. It became a political issue. The Irish Lights Commissioners (Adaptation) Order 1935 was made, amending the legislative basis for the Commissioners of Irish Lights.

On Christmas Eve 1933, Cymric grounded on a bank in Wexford Harbour. Rope, which had been used the previous day in an attempt to re-float another vessel, fouled her propeller. She spent five days aground and was eventually refloated with the aid of a diver and the removal of some barrels of malt from her cargo.

== Second World War ==
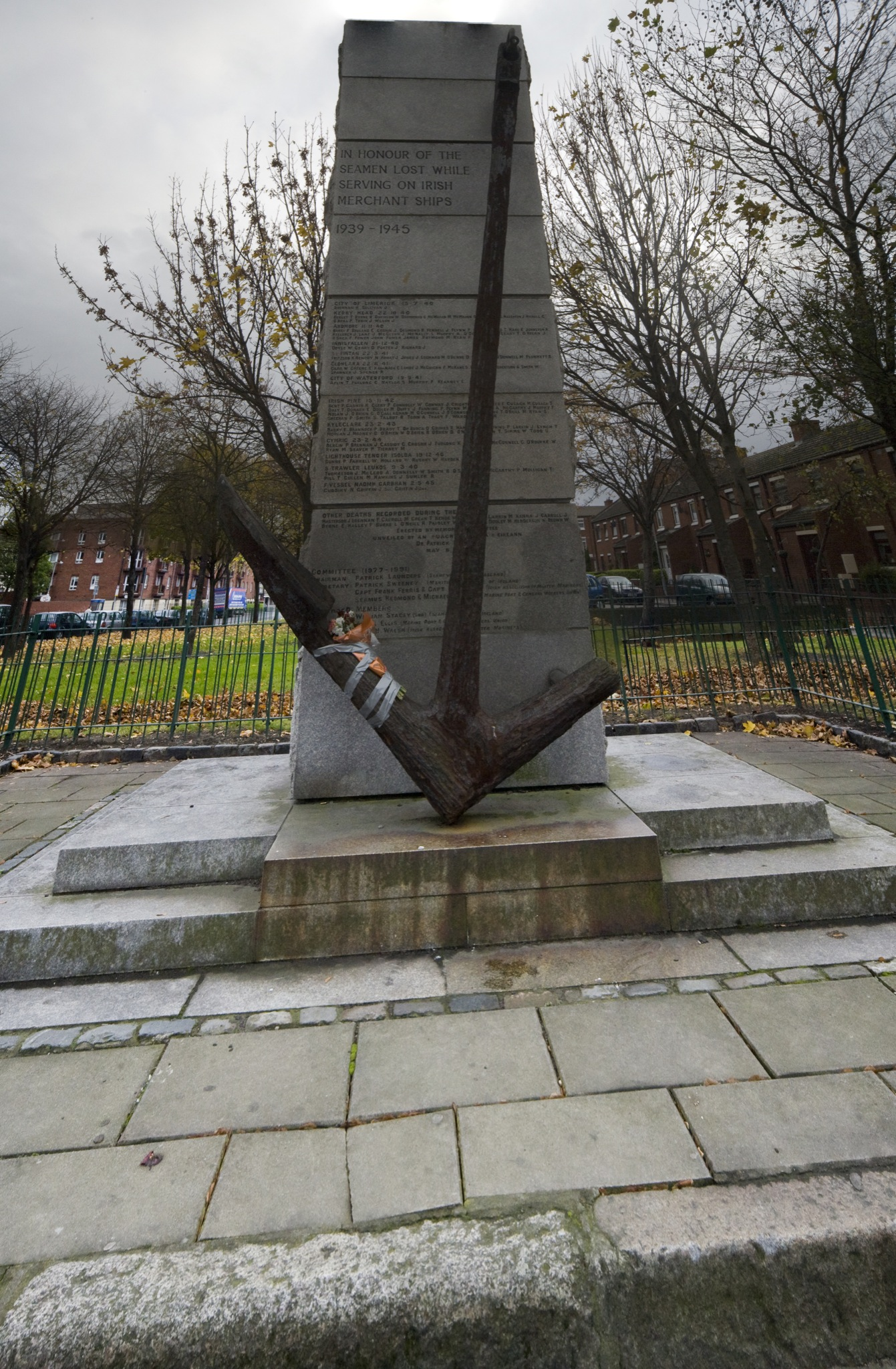
Memorial in Dublin, with the names of those lost on neutral Irish ships, including Cymric, during World War II

At the outbreak of World War II, there were only 56 ships on the Irish register; 14 of those were Arklow schooners. Sailing as neutrals, these schooners played a vital role in keeping Ireland supplied.

Cymric was charted by Betsons to travel to Portugal. Betsons imported agricultural equipment and fertilisers from America. In November 1939, Roosevelt signed the Fourth Neutrality Act forbidding American ships from entering the "war zone", which was defined as a line drawn from Spain to Iceland. Cargoes intended for Ireland were shipped to Portugal. With cargoes "piling up on the quays of Lisbon awaiting shipment", Betsons chartered Cymric to travel to Lisbon to collect these cargoes. Setting sail from Ireland, Cymric would carry food to the United Kingdom. There she would collect the British export of coal and carry it to Portugal. In Lisbon, Cymric loaded the awaiting American cargo and brought it back to Ireland.

In October 1943, she had a total refit in Ringsend Dockyard. On what was to be her final voyage, on 23 February 1944, she left Ardrossan in Scotland, where she loaded a cargo of coal for Lisbon. She was sighted off Dublin on the following day – that was her last sighting. No wreckage was ever found. She might have hit a mine, been sunk by a U-boat, or been driven by a gale into the 'prohibited area' of Bay of Biscay and been attacked and sunk by Allied aircraft enforcing the blockade. This occasionally occurred, as MV Kerlogue was strafed by the No. 307 Polish Night Fighter Squadron on 23 October 1943 in that area.

Neither the Cymric or her crew of eleven was ever seen again. When Dublin's docklands were redeveloped, a new residential street was named 'Cymric Road' 53.345°N 6.21514°W. (Note: Cymric Road in Google Maps) It is not far from where she collided with the tram. On the third Sunday of every November, those who lost their lives on neutral Irish ships, including the Cymric, are remembered.

== See also ==
- Mary B Mitchell Arklow schooner
- James Postlethwaite Arklow schooner
- MV Murell Arklow ship
- MV Tyrronall Arklow Schooner
- Irish Mercantile Marine during World War II

== Bibliography ==
- Akermann, Paul (1989). Encyclopedia of British Submarines 1901–1955. Penzance, Cornwall: Maritime Books. ISBN 1-904381-05-7.
- Burne, Lester H (2003). Richard Dean Burns (ed.). Chronological History of U.S. Foreign Relations: 1932–1988. Vol. 2. Routledge. ISBN 978-0-415-93916-4.
- Eames, Aled (1973). Ships and seamen of Anglesey, 1558–1918. Anglesey Antiquarian Society. ISBN 978-1-84527-352-1.
- Fisk, Robert (1983). In Time of War. Gill & Macmillan. ISBN 978-0-7171-2411-4.
- Forde, Frank (1981). The Long Watch. Dublin: New Island Books. ISBN 1-902602-42-0.
- Forde, Frank (1988). Maritime Arklow. Dún Laoghaire: Glendale Press. ISBN 0-907606-51-2.
- Kennedy, Walter (1998). Shipping in Dublin port, 1939–45. Pentland Press. ISBN 978-1-85821-539-6.
- Kennedy, Michael (2008). Guarding Neutral Ireland. Dublin: Four Courts Press. ISBN 978-1-84682-097-7.
- O'Halpin, Eunan (2008). Spying on Ireland. Oxford: Oxford University Press. ISBN 978-0-19-925329-6.
- Preston, Anthonu (1982). Submarines. London: Bison Books. ISBN 0-86124-043-X.
- Share, Bernard (1978). The Emergency. Dublin: Gill and Macmillan. ISBN 978-0-7171-0916-6.
- Spong, H. C. (1982). Irish Shipping Ltd., 1941–1982. World Ship Society. ISBN 978-0-905617-20-6.
- Wills, Clair (2007). That Neutral Island. London: Faber and Faber. ISBN 978-0-571-22105-9.
