= HMS J6 =

J class submarine

- RN submarine HMS J6

History

United Kingdom
- Name: HMS J6
- Builder: HM Dockyard, Devonport
- Laid down: 26 April 1915
- Launched: 9 September 1915
- Commissioned: 25 January 1916
- Fate: Sunk 15 October 1918

General characteristics
- Class & type: J-class submarine

HMS J6 was a First World War J-class submarine built for the Royal Navy by HM Dockyard at Devonport in Plymouth. Commissioned in 1916, she was sunk in a friendly fire incident by the Q-ship Cymric in October 1918.

== Career ==
Under her first commanding officer, Max Horton, J6 was launched on 9 September 1915 and commissioned on 25 January 1916. She and the other Js were members of the 11th Submarine Flotilla. She served in the North Sea chiefly in operations against German destroyers and U-boats. The closest she got to sinking the enemy was firing a torpedo at U-61, but it missed its target.

On 1 December 1917 Horton was replaced as commanding officer of J6 by Lieutenant Commander Geoffrey Warburton. In April 1918, Warburton spotted the German High Seas Fleet, which had put to sea in an attempt to hunt down an Allied convoy. Warburton did not identify the fleet as German and did not report his sighting to the Admiralty; had he done so, it is possible another full scale naval battle may have occurred.

== Loss ==
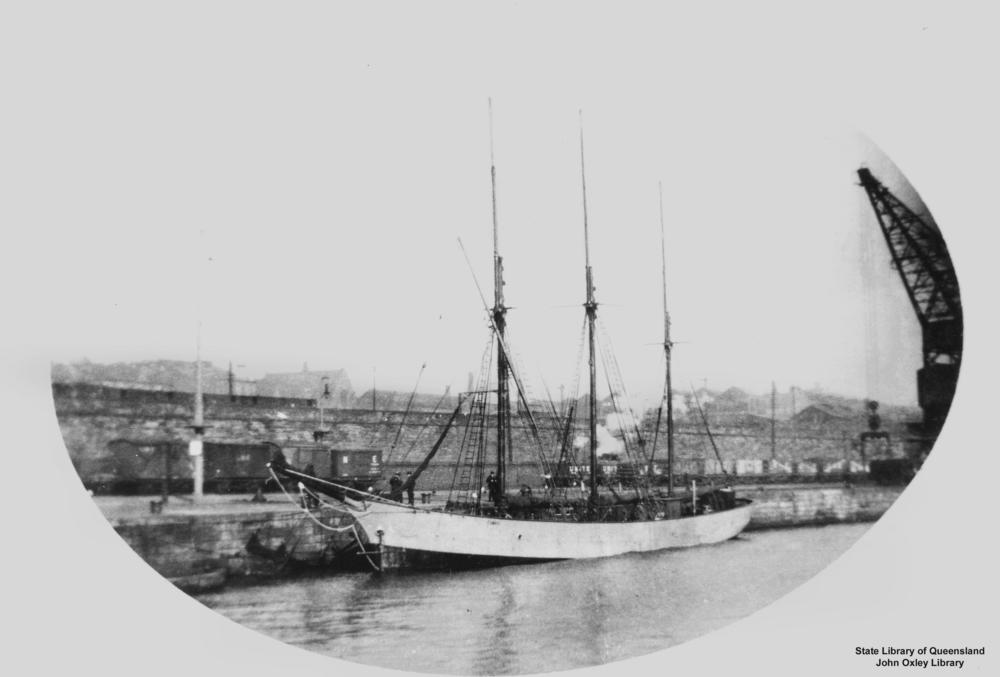
The Q-ship Cymric which sank J6

On 15 October 1918 J6 was on patrol off the Northumberland coast when she was spotted by the Q-ship Cymric. The captain of the Cymric, Lieutenant F Peterson RNR, mistook the identity lettering on the conning tower of J6 for U6. Assuming U6 to indicate a German U-boat, Peterson raised the White Ensign and opened fire on J6. J6 tried to signal, but the signalman was killed. J6 fled into a fog bank, but Cymric located J6 again and sank her. J6 sank near Beadnell. During a roll call, eight crew members could not be found. The remaining crew members had closed the escape hatches to prevent the submarine from diving for as long as possible. Therefore the crew members still inside the submarine could not escape when the ship began to dive. After a number of direct hits, J6 sank. It was only after the survivors were seen in the water when Peterson and the crew of Cymric realised their mistake and recovered the survivors. Of the crew of J6, 15 were lost; a subsequent court of enquiry found no action would be taken against Peterson. An order under the Official Secrets Act prohibited mention of this incident until 1969.

Late in 2011, it was announced divers had discovered her wreck 40 miles (64 km; 35 nmi) off the coast of Seahouses, near the village of Blyth, from where J6 had departed before it was sunk. In the summer of 2013, the Polish Navy salvage ship ORP Lech, searching for the wreck of the Polish submarine ORP Orzeł, surveyed and officially confirmed the identity of J6.

== Bibliography ==
- Akermann, Paul (1989). Encyclopedia of British Submarines 1901-1955. Periscope Publishing. ISBN 978-1-904381-05-1.
