= Canning Half Tide Dock =

Dock in Liverpool, United Kingdom

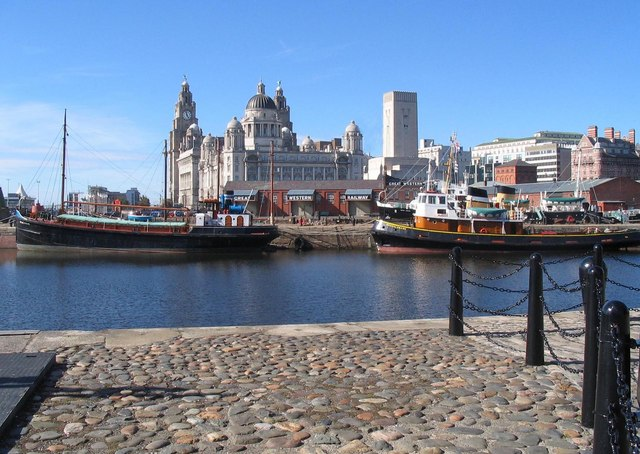
- Looking towards the Pier Head across the dock

Location
- Location: Liverpool, United Kingdom
- Coordinates: 53.4018°N 2.9937°W
- OS grid: SJ340899

Details
- Owner: Canal & River Trust
- Opened: 1844
- Type: Half tide dock
- Joins: Albert Dock; Canning Dock
- Area: 2 acres (0.81 ha), 2,689 sq yd (2,248 m^{2})
- Width at entrance: 45 ft (14 m)
- Quay length: 429 yd (392 m)

Canning Half Tide Dock on the River Mersey, in Liverpool, England, is a half tide dock and is part of the Port of Liverpool. It is situated in the southern dock system, connected to Canning Dock to the east and Albert Dock to the south.

== History ==
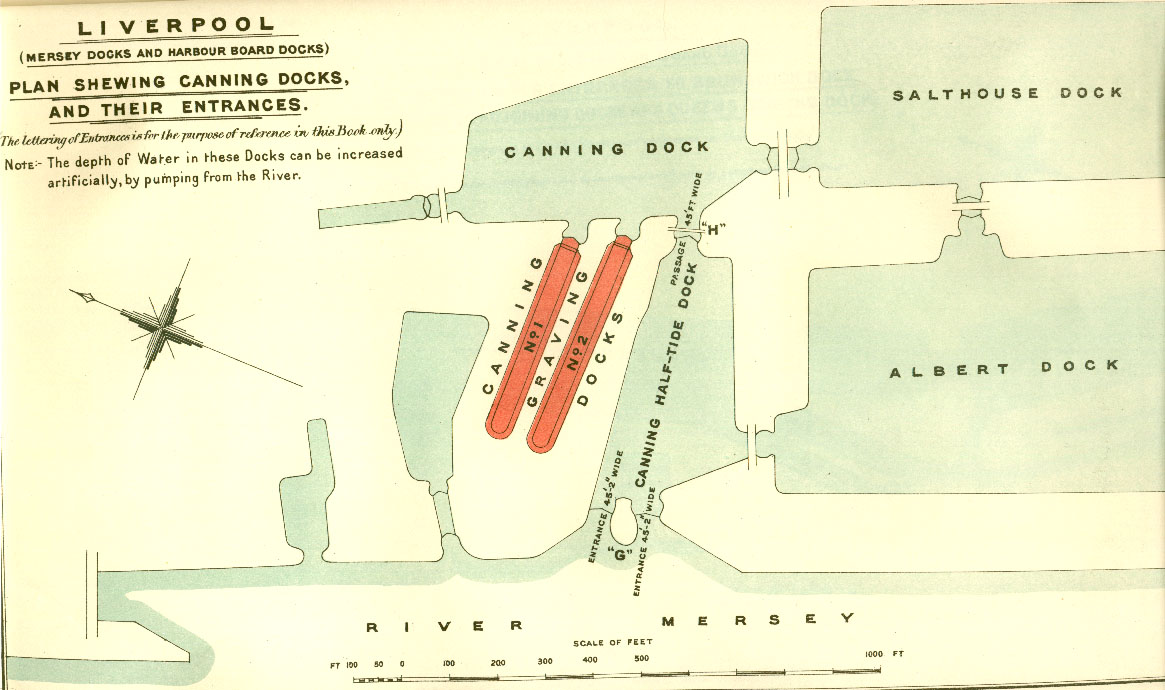
British Empire Dockyards and Ports, 1909

The dock was originally the site of the Gut, the entrance to the Dry Dock which was later to become Canning Dock. Canning Half Tide Dock was built by Jesse Hartley between 1842 and 1844, also opening in 1844.

Originally having two 45 ft (14 m) lock entrances to the Mersey, the north gates were sealed with a concrete dam in 1937. The south gates are modified to accommodate a valve to admit river water. To the outside of the river entrances are two granite octagonal gatemen's shelters, also designed by Hartley. An island built of masonry, which has its own lighthouse, separates the river entrances.

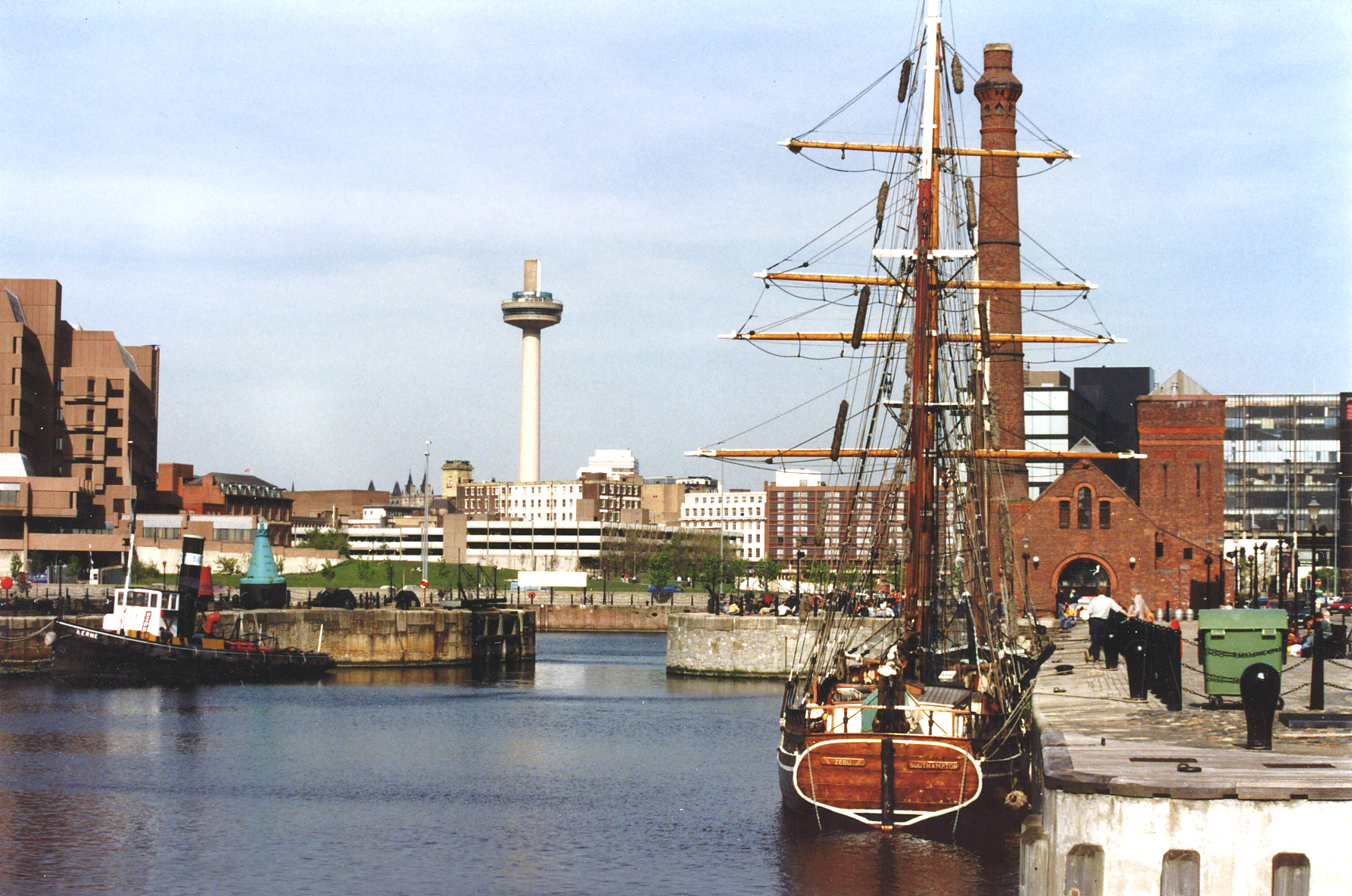
Canning Half Tide Dock.

Adjacent to the dock is the Pilotage Building, which opened in 1883 to manage the river's pilot boats. The building was converted in 1980 by the Building Design Partnership for use as a museum. Both this building and the dock itself are now part of Merseyside Maritime Museum.
