= Merseyside Maritime Museum =

Coordinates: 53.401°N 2.993°W

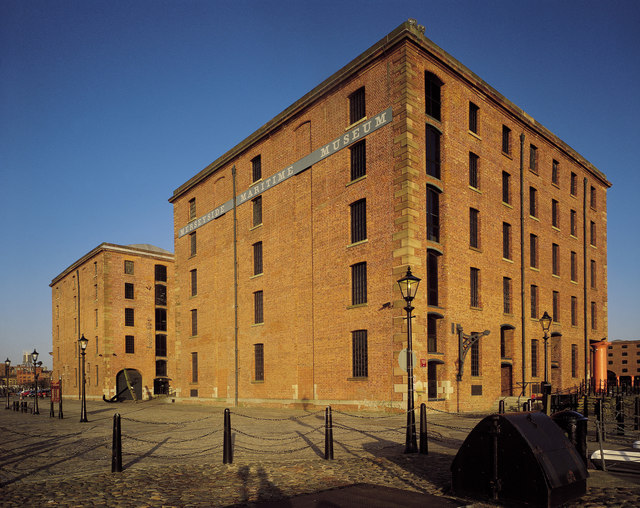
- Established: 1980
- Location: Liverpool, Merseyside, England, UK
- Type: National museum
- Visitors: 836,980 (2019): Ranked 45th nationally
- Website: www.liverpoolmuseums.org.uk/maritime

The Merseyside Maritime Museum is a museum based in the city of Liverpool, Merseyside, England. It is part of National Museums Liverpool and an Anchor Point of ERIH, The European Route of Industrial Heritage. It opened for a trial season in 1980 before fully opening in 1984 and expanding in 1986. The museum occupies warehouse block D at the Albert Dock, along with the Piermaster's House, Canning Half Tide Dock and Canning Graving Docks.

== History ==
The embryonic Merseyside Maritime Museum collection began in 1862. Over the years, the collection developed slowly due to lack of funds to the extent that by 1924 the collection was little more than 'an old dug-out canoe and a few model ships'. Robert Gladstone (maritime historian and great-nephew of former Prime Minister William Gladstone) created the shipping gallery in 1931 which was partially destroyed in the May Blitz of 1941. In 1965, the History of the Ship gallery was opened followed by the Port of Liverpool gallery (1971) and the New Shipperies Exhibition (1974). In late 1970s work began on the creation of a dedicated maritime museum which opened for a trial season in 1980.

The museum closed for renovation in January 2025 and is not scheduled to re-open until 2028.

== Collections ==
Focusing on Titanic which sank on 15 April 1912 and the Lusitania which sank after being attacked by a German U-boat during World War I on 7 May 1915. A detailed description of the ship is provided. White Star Line which owned the Titanic was in Liverpool, so Titanic carried "Liverpool" on her stern. In 2012, Rarely-seen items related to Titanic were exhibited to mark the 100th anniversary.

== Archives Centre ==
The building also houses the Archives Centre previously known as the Maritime Archives and Library.
