= Pit prop =

Lumber for use in reinforcing mine tunnels

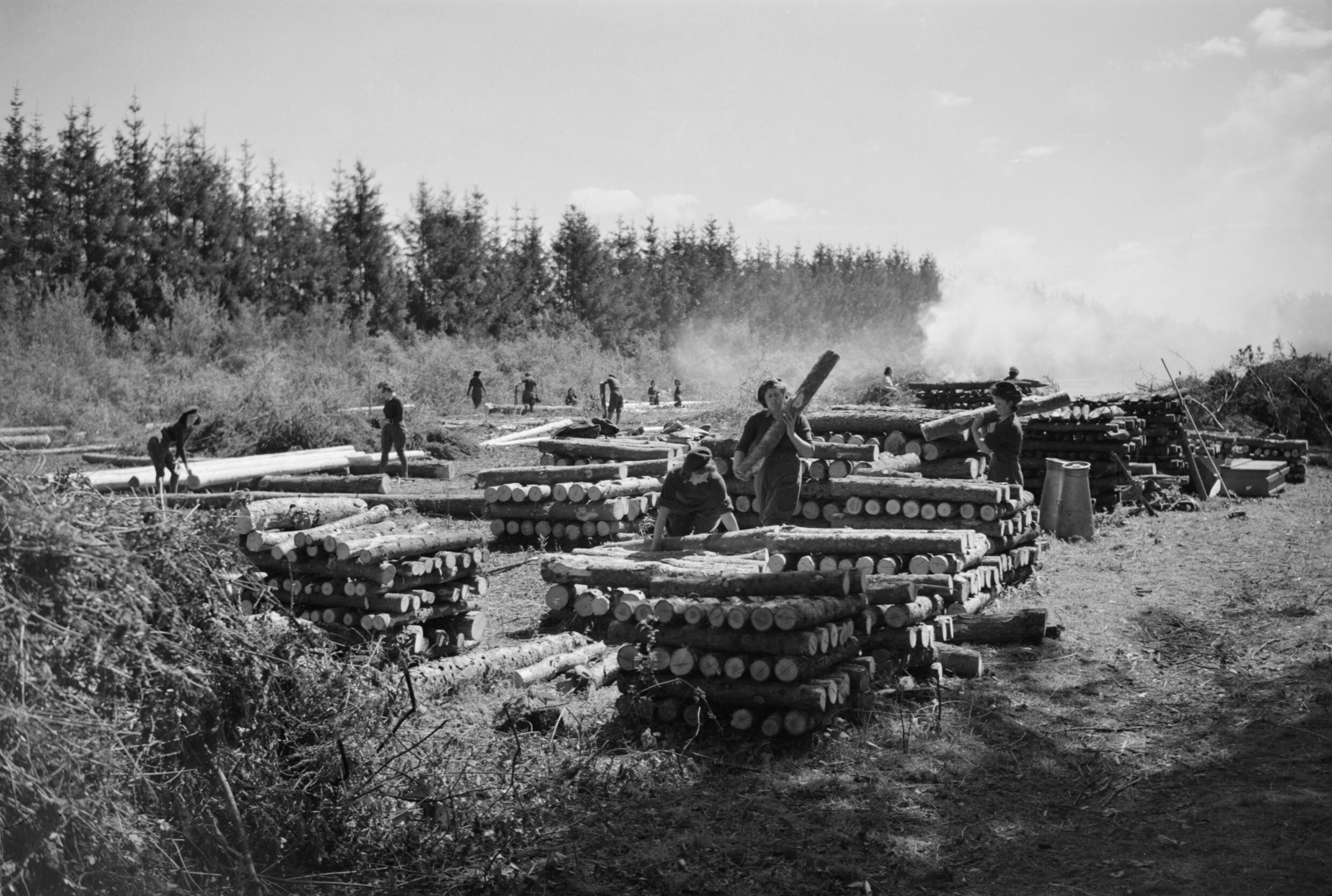
Lumberjacks stacking pit props to be used in coal mines (1943)

A pit prop or mine prop (British and American usage, respectively) is a length of lumber used to prop up the roofs of tunnels in mines.

Canada, northern Sweden and Norway traditionally supplied pit props to the British market. As coal mining declined in importance and metal supports were used, the term became infrequently used.

Though it was merely a log cut to a particular length, it was classified as a finished product and so got around the extra Canadian tariffs on the export of raw lumber.

Because of the large quantities exported, it is probable many ended up in British pulp mills.

Most pit props were made from the wood of spruce and pine trees.
