= MV Murell =

History
- Name: Fiddown (1940–43); Empire Estuary (1943–46); Goldfawn (1946–52); Creekdawn (1952–54); Murell (1954–72)
- Owner: S Morris Ltd (1940–42); Ministry of War Transport (1942–45); Ministry of Transport (1945–46); E J & W Goldsmith Ltd (1946-52); Springwell Shipping Co Ltd (1952–54); J Tyrell (1954–66); Arklow Shipping Ltd (1966–72)
- Operator: S Morris Ltd (1940–41); Craggs & Jenkin Ltd (1943–46); E J & W Goldsmith Ltd (1946-52); Springwell Shipping Co Ltd (1952–54); J Tyrell (1954–66); Arklow Shipping Ltd (1966–72)
- Port of registry: (United Kingdom) Goole, UK (1940-41, 1943–46); (United Kingdom) London (1946–54); (Republic of Ireland) Dublin, Ireland (1954–72)
- Builder: Goole Shipbuilding & Repairing Co Ltd
- Yard number: 350
- Launched: 9 May 1940
- Completed: July 1940
- Identification: United Kingdom Official Number 164907 (1940–41, 1943–54); Code Letters MJJY (1940–41, 1943–54)
- Fate: Scrapped

General characteristics
- Type: Cargo ship
- Tonnage: 319 GRT; 163 NRT
- Length: 133 ft 8 in (40.74 m)
- Beam: 24 ft 7 in (7.49 m)
- Draught: 7 ft 5 in (2.26 m)
- Depth: 9 ft 6 3/4 in (2.915 m)
- Propulsion: Diesel engine driving a single screw propeller

MV Murell was a 319 GRT coaster that was built in 1940 as Fiddown by Goole Shipbuilding & Repairing Co Ltd, Goole, Yorkshire, United Kingdom for S Morris Ltd. In 1940, she was run down and sunk by HMS Campbelltown in the Mersey Estuary. She was salvaged in 1942, repaired and passed to the Ministry of War Transport (MoWT), renamed Empire Estuary. She was sold into merchant service in 1946 and renamed Goldfawn. A further sale in 1952 saw her renamed Creekdawn. A sale to an Irish company in 1954 saw her renamed Murell. She served until 1972, when she was scrapped.

== Description ==
The ship was built in 1940 by Goole Shipbuilding & Repairing Co Ltd, Goole, Yorkshire. She was yard number 350.

The ship was 133 feet 8 inches (40.74 m) long, with a beam of 24 feet 7 inches (7.49 m). She had a depth of 7 feet 5 inches (2.26 m), and a draught of 9 feet 6 3/4 inches (2.915 m). She was assessed at 319 GRT, 163 NRT,

The ship was propelled by a 115 nhp two-stroke Single Cycle, Single Action diesel engine, which had six cylinders of 10 1/2 inches (270 mm) diameter by 13 1/2 inches (340 mm) stroke driving a single screw propeller. The engine was built by Crossley Brother Ltd, Manchester, Lancashire.

== History ==
=== World War II ===
Fiddown was built for S Morris Ltd, Goole. She was launched on 9 May 1940 and completed in July. She was built for S Morris Ltd, Dublin, Ireland. Due to wartime export restrictions, she was placed under the British Flag, with Goole as her port of registry. The United Kingdom Official Number 164907 and Code Letters MJJY were allocated. Little is known of her service, although she was a member of Convoy FN 222, which departed from Southend, Essex on 14 July 1940 and arrived at Methil, Fife two days later. On 29 November 1941, Fiddown collided with HMS Campbelltown in the Mersey Estuary and sunk. She was raised and beached at Tranmere, Cheshire on 7 July 1942. On 10 July, she was refloated and taken to a shipyard for repairs.

Fiddown was requisitioned by the MoWT. She was renamed Empire Estuary and re-entered service in 1943. She was placed under the management of Craggs & Jenkin Ltd, remaining registered at Goole and retaining the Code Letters MJJY. On 2 June 1944, Empire Estuary joined Convoy EBC 1, which departed from Barry, Glamorgan and sailed to the St Helens Roads, off the Isle of Wight. She then sailed to the Solent to join Convoy EBC 3W, which departed on 8 June and arrived at the Seine Bay, France the next day. She was to spend the next three months sailing between the Seine Bay and Southend, with a couple of visits to Southampton, Hampshire in August. In September, Empire Estuary was operating in convoys between Newhaven, East Sussex and Dieppe, France.

=== Post-war ===
In 1946, Empire Estuary was sold to E J & W Goldsmith Ltd, London and renamed Goldfawn. In 1952, Goldfawn was sold to Springwell Shipping Co Ltd, London and renamed Creekdawn. In 1952, Creekdawn was sold to James Tyrrell, Arklow, and renamed Murell (derived from his wife's name, Kathleen Muriel Tyrrell (née Hicks)). In 1966, Arklow Shipping Ltd was formed in Arklow. Murell was one of the original seven ships owned by the company. She served until February 1972, when she was scrapped in Dublin.
