= MV Tyrronall =

1935 coaster trading vessel

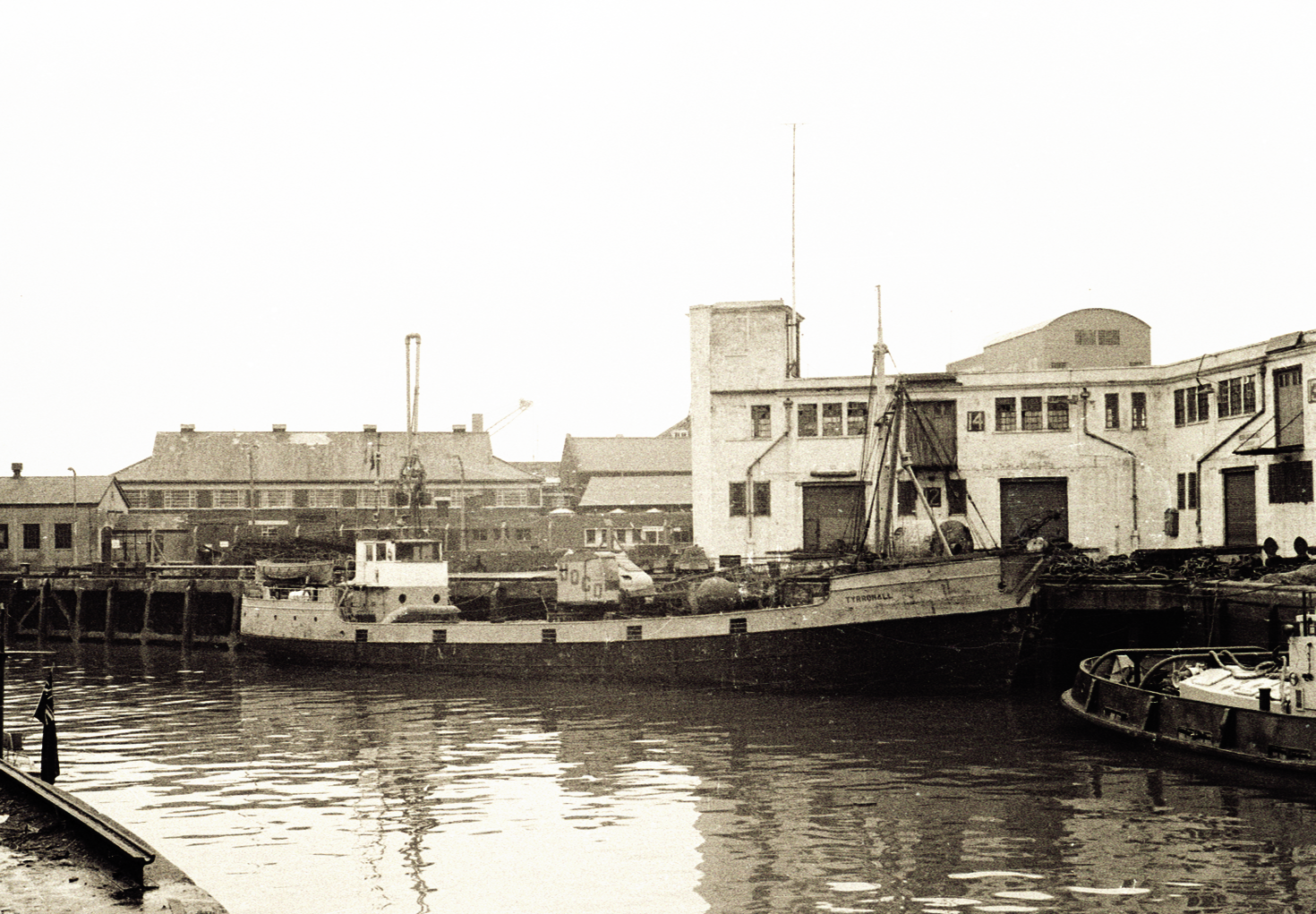
- Tyrronall at dock in Old Portsmouth Harbour in 1973

History
- Name: Heimat (1935–45); Empire Contamar (1945–47); Tyrronall (1947–74)
- Owner: Hugo Rubarth (1935–47); Ministry of War Transport (1945); Ministry of Transport (1945–47); F J Tyrrell (1947–61); J Tyrrell (1961–66); Arklow Shipping Ltd (1966–68); A J Gough (1968–73); Smith & Fenton (1973–74)
- Operator: Hugo Rubarth (1935–47); unknown (1945–47); F J Tyrrell (1947–61); J Tyrrell (1961–66); Arklow Shipping Ltd (1966–68); A J Gough (1968–73); Underwater Operations Co Ltd (1973–74)
- Port of registry: (Nazi Germany) Hamburg (1935–45); (United Kingdom) London (1945–47); (United Kingdom) Cardiff (1947–61); (Republic of Ireland) Dublin (1961–74)
- Builder: Flender Werke AG
- Launched: 1935
- Identification: Code Letters DJPN (1935–45)
- Fate: Scrapped

General characteristics
- Type: Schooner (1935–47); Coaster (1947–74)
- Tonnage: 199 GRT (1935–47); 248 GRT (1947–74); 92 NRT (1935–47)
- Length: 107 ft 0 in (32.61 m)
- Beam: 23 ft 1 in (7.04 m)
- Depth: 8 ft 9 in (2.67 m)
- Propulsion: Sails and 4SCSA diesel engine (1935–47); 4SCSA diesel engine (1947–74)
- Sail plan: Schooner (1935–47)
- Complement: 7

Tyrronall was a 248 GRT coaster that was built in 1935 as the 199 GRT schooner Heimat by Flender Werke AG, Lübeck, Germany for German owners. She was seized by the Allies in May 1945, passed to the Ministry of War Transport (MoWT) and was renamed Empire Contamar.

In 1947, she ran aground at St Austell, Cornwall. Although refloated she was declared a constructive total loss. She was rebuilt as a motor vessel, sold into merchant service and renamed Tyrronall. Further rebuilds were undertaken in 1950 and 1961, when she was sold to Ireland. She was sold to a British owner in 1968 and served until 1974, when she was scrapped in Santander, Spain.

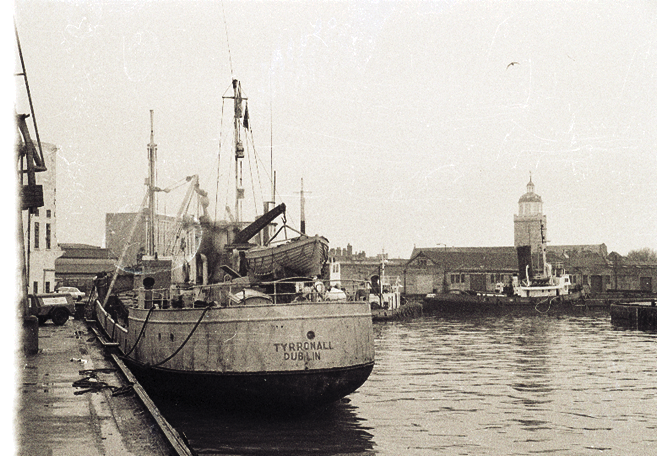
MV Tyrronnall in Old Portsmouth Harbour in November 1973

== Description ==
The ship was built in 1935 by Lübecker Flender-Werke AG, Lübeck. As built, the ship was 107 feet 0 inches (32.61 m) long, with a beam of 23 feet 1 inch (7.04 m) and a depth of 9 feet 6 inches (2.90 m). Built as a 3-masted schooner, the ship was also propelled by a 4-stroke Single Cycle Single Acting diesel engine, which had 4 cylinders of 10 11/16 inches (27 cm) diameter by 16 9/16 inches (42 cm) stroke. The engines were built by Deutsche Werke AG, Kiel.

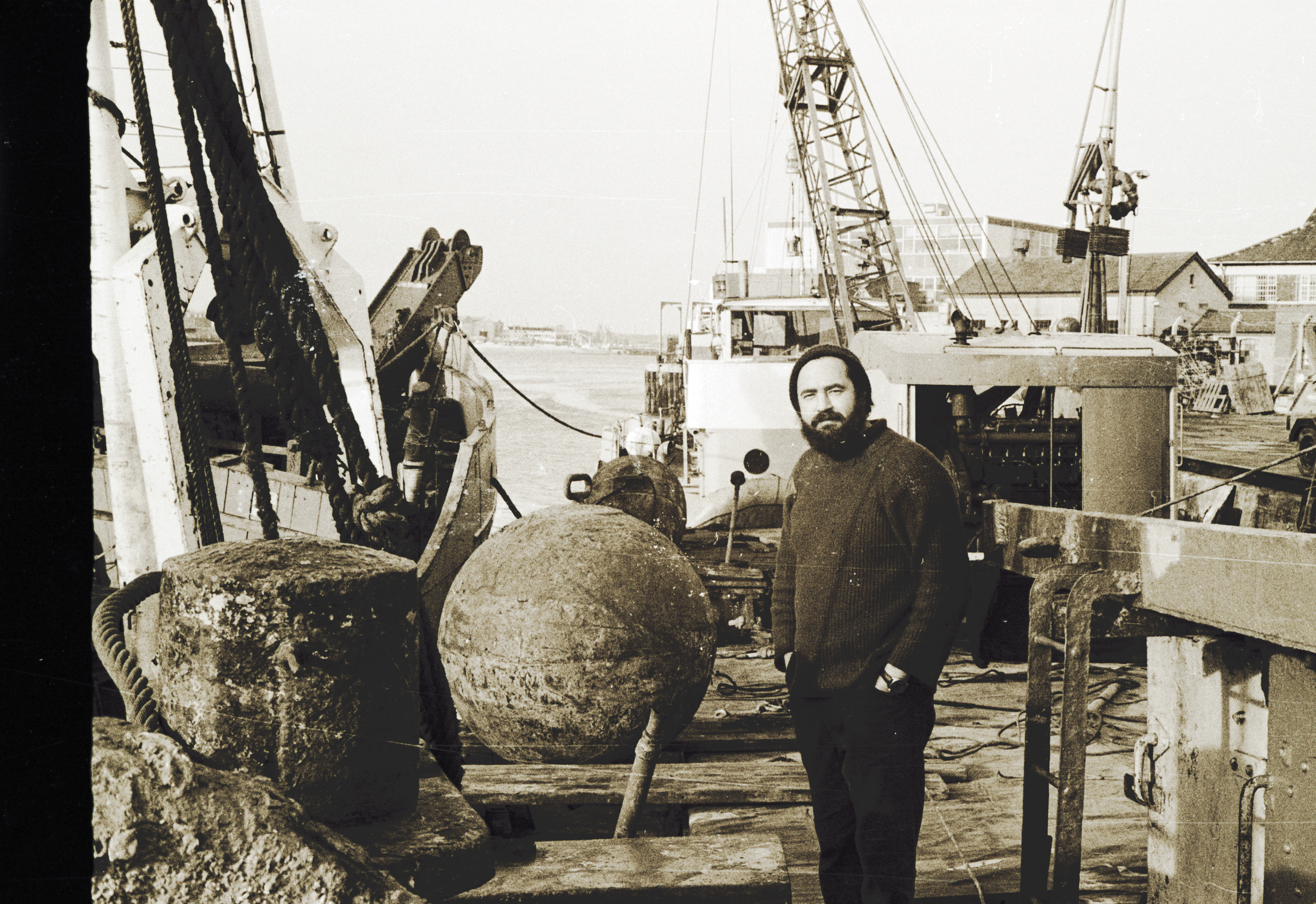
Mike smith Captain and Owner

== History ==
Heimat was built for Hugo Rubarth, Hamburg. On 29 May 1943, she rescued the crew of the Swedish cargo ship Gondul, which had hit a magnetic mine and sank off Wismar, Germany. In 1945, Heimat was seized by the Allies at Kiel. She was passed to the MoWT and renamed Empire Contamar.

On 22 March 1947, Empire Contamar ran aground in St Austell Bay. Coxwain Joseph Watters of the Fowey lifeboat was awarded a RNLI Bronze Medal for his action in rescuing the seven crew. Empire Contamar was refloated in June 1947, but was declared a constructive total loss.

Empire Contamar was sold to F J Tyrrell, Cardiff. She was rebuilt as a 248 GRT coaster at a shipyard on the Clyde and was renamed Tyrronall. Further rebuilds were undertaken in 1950 and 1961. In the latter year, Tyrronall was sold to J Tyrrell, Dublin. In 1966, Arklow Shipping Ltd was formed in Arklow. Tyrronall was one of the original seven ships owned by the company. In 1968, Tyrronall was sold to A J Gough, Hornchurch, United Kingdom, but retained her Irish registry. In 1973, she was sold to M A Smith, St Peter Port, Guernsey and J E Fenton, Chagford. She was converted to a salvage ship and operated under the management of Underwater Operations Co Ltd. She was scrapped at Santander, Spain in June 1974.

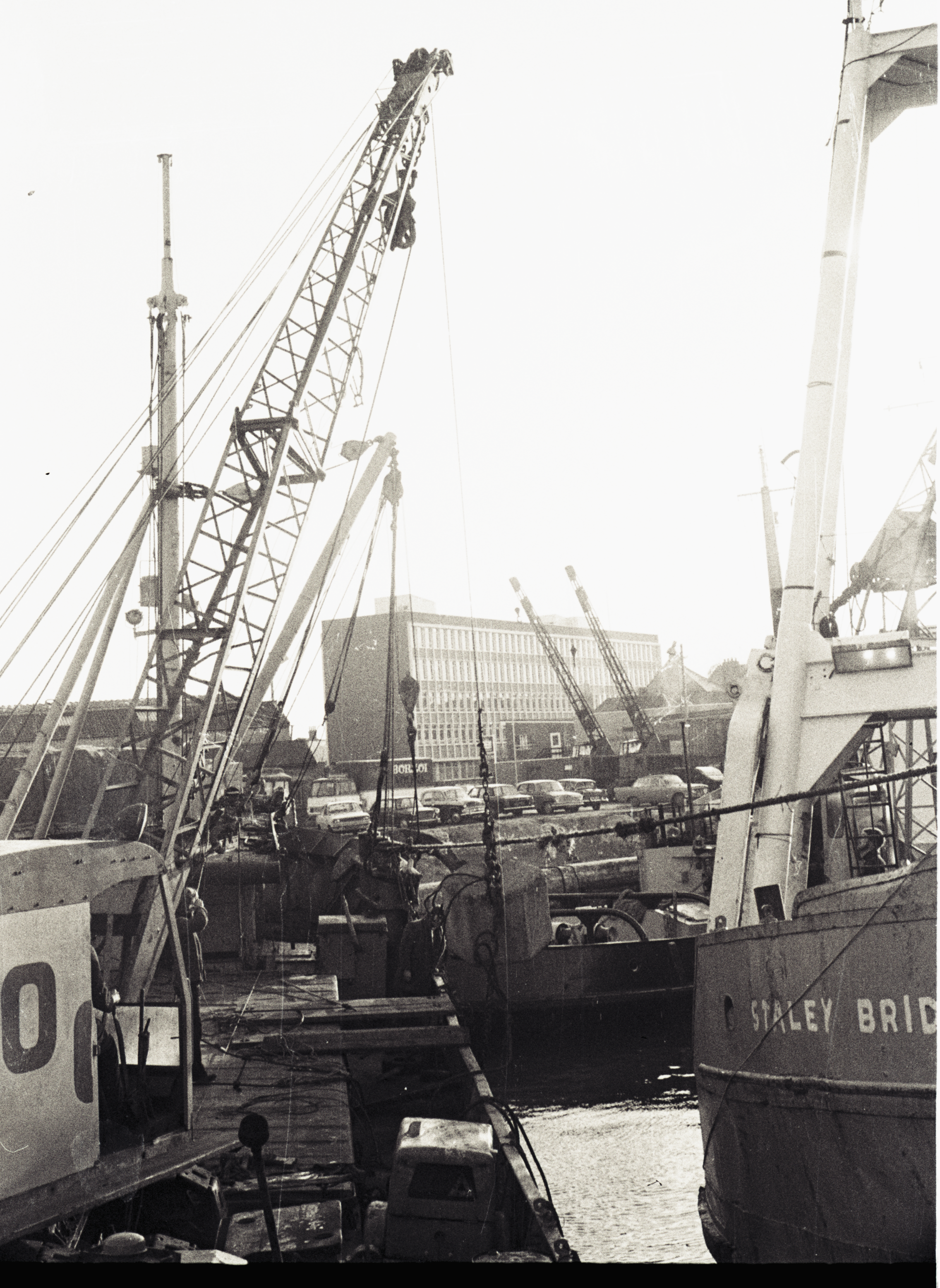
MV Tyrronnall with Staley Bridge in Old Portsmouth Harbour November 1973
