= Irish Mercantile Marine during World War II =

Overview of the IMM during World War II

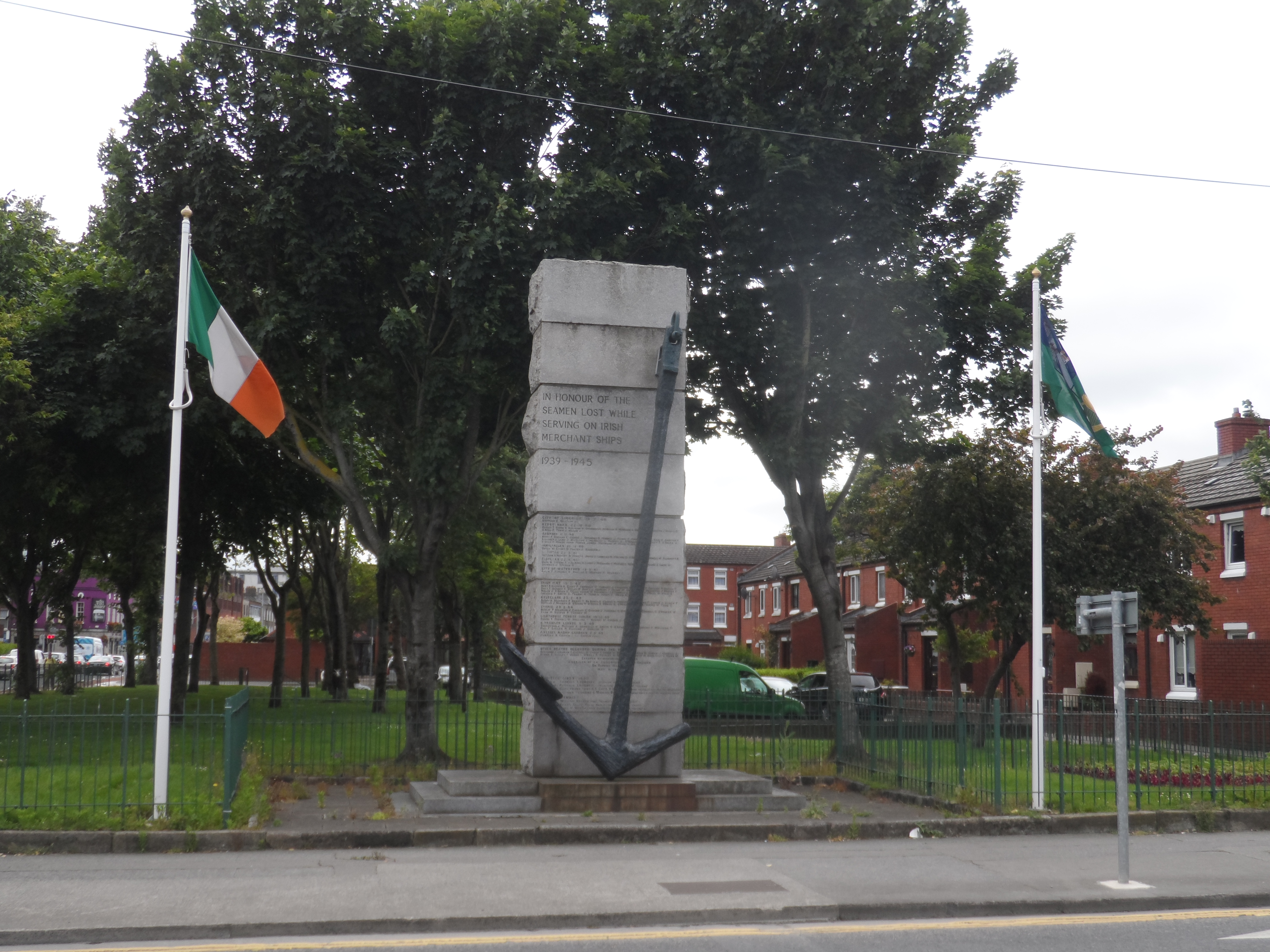
Seaman's Memorial, Dublin

The Irish Mercantile Marine during World War II continued essential overseas trade in the conflict, a period referred to as The Long Watch by Irish mariners. (Note: In Ireland it is the "Mercantile Marine"; in the United Kingdom, it is the "Merchant Navy"; in the USA, it is the "Merchant Marine".)

Irish merchant shipping saw to it that vital imports continued to arrive and exports, mainly food supplies to Great Britain, were delivered. Irish ships sailed unarmed and usually alone, identifying themselves as neutrals with bright lights and by painting the Irish tricolour and EIRE (Note: Éire is the Irish name for Ireland. From 1937 "Ireland" was the correct name for the country. Prior to that it was the "Irish Free State". British documents of the time, tended to use the word "Eire" while the USA used "Irish Republic". Churchill said "Southern Ireland".) in large letters on their sides and decks. Nonetheless, twenty percent of seamen serving in Irish ships perished, victims of a war not their own: attacked by both sides, though predominantly by the Axis powers. Often, Allied convoys did not stop to pick up survivors, while Irish ships regularly answered SOS signals and stopped to rescue survivors, irrespective of which side they belonged to. Irish ships rescued 534 seamen. (Note: 534 lives were saved, this excludes rescues by lifeboats, fishing trawlers and other craft. Most sources say 521, this comes from a list of rescues in Appendix 4 of Frank Forde's book The Long Watch. However that list omits the rescue of 13 survivors from Roxby by Irish Beech.)

At the outbreak of World War II, known as "The Emergency", (Note: "The Emergency" was an official euphemism used by the Irish Government to refer to World War II.) Ireland declared neutrality and became more isolated than ever before. Shipping had been neglected since the Irish War of Independence. Foreign ships, on which Ireland's trade had hitherto depended, were less available; neutral American ships would not enter the "war zone". In his Saint Patrick's Day address in 1940, Taoiseach Éamon de Valera lamented:

"No country had ever been more effectively blockaded because of the activities of belligerents and our lack of ships..."

Ireland was a net food exporter. The excess was shipped to Britain. The Irish Mercantile Marine ensured that Irish agricultural, and other, exports reached Britain, and that British coal arrived in Ireland. Some foods such as wheat, citric fruits and tea were imported. Ireland depended on, mainly, British tankers for petroleum. (Note: As the Dublin registered Inver tanker fleet had been transferred to the British register.) Initially Irish ships sailed in British convoys. In the light of experience they chose to sail alone, relying on their neutral markings. German respect for that neutrality varied from friendly to tragic.

"Cross-channel" trade, between Ireland and Britain, was from both national perspectives, the most important Irish trade route. Irish ships crossed the Atlantic on a route defined by the Allies: a line from Fastnet Rock to the Azores and then along the line of latitude at 38° North. Ships on the "Lisbon-run", imported wheat and fruits from Spain and Portugal, as well as goods transhipped from the Americas. They followed the line of longitude at 12° West, while Allied convoys to Gibraltar were 20° West.

There were never more than 800 men, at any one time, serving on Irish ships in the war.

== Background ==
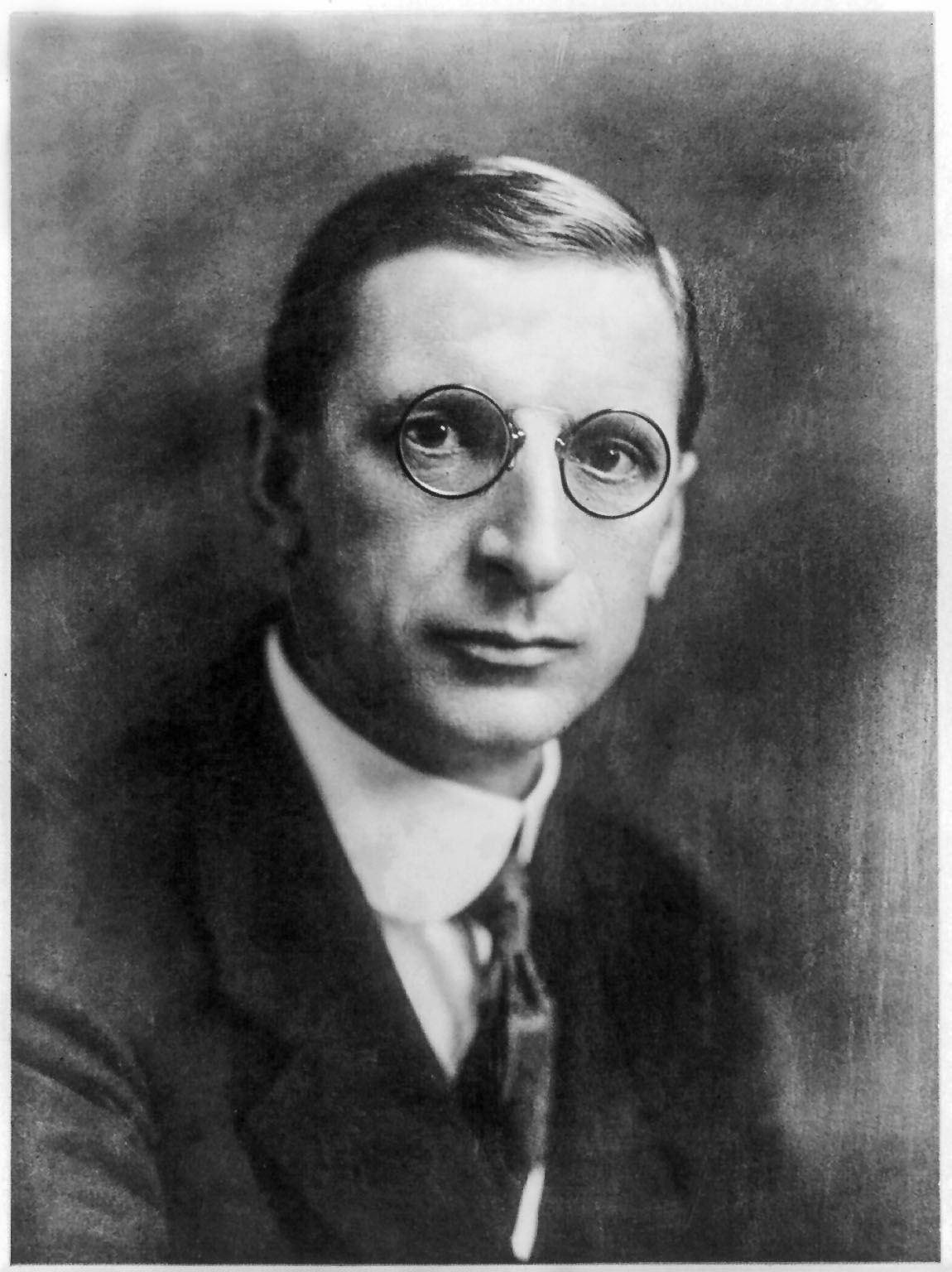
Taoiseach Éamon de Valera was in office December 1937 – February 1948

Following independence in 1921, there was no state encouragement to develop the mercantile marine. (Note: the Ports and Harbours Tribunal reported "Public Apathy in Port Affairs".) "Our new leaders seemed to turn their backs upon the sea and to ignore the fact that we are an island". Each year the fleet declined. In 1923, the merchant fleet consisted of 127 ships. This number dropped every year until 1939 when, at the start of World War II, the fleet numbered only 56 ships. Only 5% of imports were carried on Irish flagged vessels. There were several reasons for this decline: a consequence of the war of independence, a policy of self-sufficiency, the economic depression, the lack of investment and government neglect. Foreign ships, on which Ireland had hitherto depended, were withdrawn. "In the period April 1941 and June 1942 only seven such ships visited the country". The war of independence (1919–1921), and the civil war (1921–1922) which followed it, left the country in near economic collapse. There had been destruction of industry and infrastructure. Many industries relocated abroad. It was often cheaper to transport by sea, within Ireland, rather than using the poor road and rail networks. To take advantage of this commercial opportunity, new coasters (Note: Coaster: as the name implies, these ships were suited to travelling close to shore, between ports on the same island. They were suited for shallow waters, unsuited for the oceans. The assumption was that if a storm threatened they could promptly reach the safety of a harbour.) were acquired in the 1930s, intended to ply between Irish ports. These ships would be invaluable once hostilities began. Many of these small coasters were lost, particularly on the "Lisbon run", a voyage for which they were never intended.

The then Taoiseach (Prime Minister) Éamon de Valera advocated a policy of self-sufficiency. Foreign imports were discouraged. "It was an important status symbol in the modern world for a country to produce her own goods and be self-sufficient."

Menapia leaving São Tomé November 1943 with a cargo of palm oil, an 8,000 mile voyage for a 900 GRT ship. – Oil by Kenneth King – Straid Studio Glencolmcille

The global economic depression of the early 1930s affected Ireland less because of the partial recovery following the civil war and because industry was protected behind tariff barriers established in the Anglo-Irish Trade War (1932–1938). (Note: In their election manifesto in 1948 Fianna Fáil claimed to have established 100 new industries and 900 factories.) The need for extra sea capacity was readily met by British and other foreign ships. Foreign ships were used, rather than preserving the home fleet. Banks were reluctant to lend to Irish industry, preferring British government gilts. (Note: The government set up the "Commission of Inquiry into Banking, Currency and Credit")

Although there was state support for many industries, this did not extend to shipping. In 1933 de Valera's government established the Turf Development Board, turf became Ireland's primary source of fuel during the emergency years and was stockpiled as imported coal was in short supply. In 1935 civil servants in de Valera's own department warned him of the consequences a war would have on the importation of fuel. He ignored that warning. Earlier, in 1926 the Ports and Harbours Tribunal was initiated. The tribunal received "abundant evidence" of "inefficient, uneconomic and extravagant management". It submitted a report in 1930 with recommendations which were not implemented until after the war. The tribunal observed "the public generally do not, we fear, appreciate the importance of our harbours ...". Vickers-Armstrongs liquidated their subsidiary Vickers (Ireland) Ltd. on 15 November 1938; their Dublin Dockyard had ceased operation in 1937.

On 2 September 1939 the "realisation dawned on Ireland that the country was surrounded by water and that the sea was of vital importance to her". By this point, however, British wartime restrictions on shipping were already in place. Historian Bryce Evans has argued that the failure of Seán Lemass and others to establish an Irish mercantile marine in the 1930s would exacerbate Irish supply problems in the Second World War.

=== Response ===
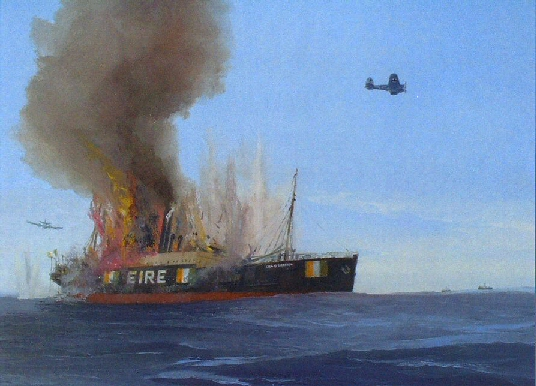
City of Limerick returning from the "Lisbon Run" with a cargo of fruit, en route to Liverpool for inspection. Sunk by bombs 15 July 1940, killing two of her crew. Oil by Kenneth King, National Maritime Museum of Ireland

Seán Lemass as Minister for Industry and Commerce, and later Minister for Supplies sought to address these issues. Many infant industries were developed in the 1930s behind a protective tariff barrier. (This is the origin of the term "Tariff Jews", Seán Lemass from 1932 helped Jewish entrepreneurs (Note: Sam Brown, a "Tariff Jew" from Liverpool lived at 4 Walworth Road, which is now the Irish Jewish Museum) to set up manufacturing businesses) These industries proved valuable in the war years. They reduced the need for imports, for example in 1931 over five million pairs of shoes were imported, by 1938 this had fallen to a quarter of a million pairs. Between 1931 and 1938, Gross Industrial Output rose from £55 million to £90 million; and Industrial Employment from 162,000 to 217,000. In 1933 the government established the Industrial Credit Corporation to finance industry. In 1938, Life Assurers were required to hold their reserves in Ireland, to make capital available for industry; promptly five of the six UK providers closed, (Note: The five were: Prudential, Britannic, Liverpool Victoria Friendly Society, Pearl, and Refuge; The Royal Liver remained.) lodging their business with Irish Assurance. (Note: As a consequence of the great depression, life assurers went technically insolvent. These companies were: City of Dublin Assurance Company, Irish Life and General Assurance Company, Irish National Assurance Company, and Munster and Leinster Assurance Company. The government response was to merge them.) Private enterprises established included: Grain Importers Ltd., Animal Feed Stuffs Ltd., Fuel Importers Ltd., Oil and Fats Ltd., Timber Importers Ltd., and Tea Importers Ltd. Industry was encouraged, such as the plans for Irish National Refineries Ltd. to build an oil refinery. The former Vickers repair yard in Dublin port was reopened, in 1940, by the Dublin Port and Docks Board. It repaired British and Irish ships. Semi-state enterprises were established, including Irish Shipping in 1941 (Note: Irish Shipping was initially 51% government owned) which purchased nine vessels and leased six more.

=== War declared ===
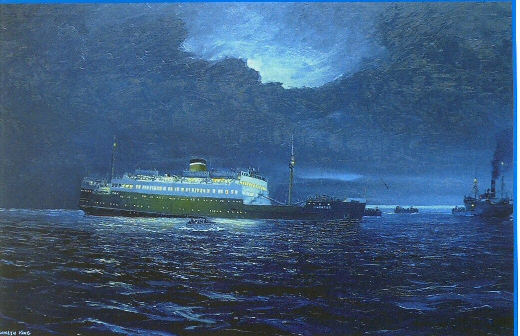
Munster mined approaching Liverpool, 2 Feb 1940, all 250 aboard survived (one died later). Oil by Kenneth King National Maritime Museum of Ireland

At the outbreak of the Second World War Ireland declared neutrality. There were a total of 56 Irish ships at the outbreak of World War II; 15 more were purchased or leased in the conflict, and 16 were lost. (Note: 16 ships were lost to belligerents, including Isolda, a lighthouse tender, excluding two fishers Naomh Garbain and ST Leukos, plus Maigue, Rynanna and Crest all lost to 'perils of the sea' (all were grounded and wrecked).) Up to then most Irish-registered ships had been flying the Red Ensign of the United Kingdom Merchant Navy. All were required by UK law to fly the Red Ensign, but some, such as the Wexford Steamship Company ships, had always travelled under the tricolour. With the outbreak of hostilities, choices were forced. The Irish government ordered all Irish ships to fly the tricolour. Some British ships were on the Irish register, such as the whalers which were Scottish-owned (Christian Salvesen Shipping) but Irish-registered in order to take advantage of the Irish whale quota. The six whale catchers and the two factory ships were pressed into British naval service, after their owners transferred them to the British registry. Some ships which could be described as British also choose the Tricolour. Kerrymore, which was registered as belonging to R McGowan of Tralee, was actually owned by Kelly Colliers of Belfast. Most of the crew had addresses in loyalist areas of Belfast. For six years they sailed under the tricolour.

The British and Irish Steam Packet Company's Munster which operated the Dublin to Liverpool route, flew the tricolour. But, no flag was a protection against mines; Munster struck a mine approaching Liverpool and sank. There were over 200 passengers and 50 crew on board. A few hours later they were all rescued by the collier Ringwall. Four were injured; and one died later. The L&NWR ferries Cambria, Hibernia and Scotia (Note: Anglia was withdrawn in 1935) were Irish-registered and sailed between Dún Laoghaire and Holyhead, under the Red Ensign. Their British crews were taken aback when the tricolour was hoisted. They went on strike and refused to sail until the ships were transferred to the British registry and red ensign was restored. Scotia was sunk in the Dunkirk evacuation with the loss of 30 crew and 300 troops. Hibernia had a fortunate escape on the night of 20 December 1940. She was berthing at Dún Laoghaire when a German bomber swooped down. All lights were extinguished. Bombs fell on the nearby Sandycove railway station. The GWR ferries operated the Rosslare to Fishguard route sailed under the red ensign. Thirty lives were lost when their Saint Patrick was bombed and sunk. The British and Irish Steam Packet Company had some of its ships on the British registry with others on the Irish registry.

== Cargo ==
Land Area under Tillage
1911	1,697,338 acres (686,890 ha)
1916	1,735,000 acres (702,130 ha)
1918	2,383,000 acres (964,370 ha)
1921	1,807,843 acres (731,610 ha)
1932	1,424,000 acres (576,270 ha)
1939	1,492,000 acres (603,790 ha)
1941	2,235,413 acres (904,640 ha)
1944	2,567,000 acres (1,038,830 ha)
1951	1,717,283 acres (694,960 ha)
1961	1,598,700 acres (646,970 ha)
Chart illustrating how Irish agriculture responded to war-time demands of World War I and World War II

=== Exports ===
The main export was agricultural produce to Britain. In the First World War, Ireland's food production increased to meet Britain's needs; a pattern which would be repeated for the Second World War. In 1916 there were 1,735,000 acres (702,130 ha) under plough, this increased to 2,383,000 acres (964,370 ha) in 1918, and then fell back. By the start of the trade war in 1932 tillage had fallen to 1,424,000 acres (576,270 ha).

The trade war between Ireland and Britain started in 1932, in which Britain imposed a tax on Irish products. Cattle from the Irish Republic were taxed but cattle from Northern Ireland were not. So, cattle were smuggled across the border. In 1934/5, about 100,000 cattle were "exported" in this way. The Department of Supplies was "all in favour of the smuggling and urged that nothing should be done which might stop it". By then, Britain was anxious to secure Irish food supplies before another world war. (Note: "Ireland did actually have the British over a barrel for a very simple reason - there was going to be a very large war in Europe and it was also evident from the First World War experience that there was a huge danger of Britain and Ireland being cut off from food supplies overseas".) Survival in the looming war was the spur. There were a series of agreements from the "cattle-coal pact" of 1935 to the Anglo-Irish Trade Agreement of 1938 which ended the dispute, on terms favourable to Ireland.

Irish Cattle and Beef Exports in World War II
Item	1938	1939	1940	1941	1942	1943	1944	1945
Cattle, thousands	702	784	636	307	616	453	445	496
Beef, thousand tons (Note: At this time, in Ireland, imperial tons (also called long ton) were used, that is 1 ton = 2,240 pounds, or 1,016 kilograms)	0.0	1.0	0.3	16.2	5.7	1.0	3.1	3.9
There was an outbreak of foot-and-mouth disease in 1941. For some months the export and movement of live cattle was prohibited. The drop in numbers in 1943 may be the result of smuggling

Under the "cattle-coal pact", the British set up a central authority for the purchase of cattle, under John Maynard Keynes. The prices set before the war were attractive. As the war progressed, open market prices rose dramatically. Cattle from Northern Ireland fetched a better price, so smuggling, as practised in the trade war, resumed. (Note: Cattle numbers peaked at 4,246,000 in 1944 yet consumption remained level and official exports fell) In answer to the demand for food in World War II, the area under plough increased from 1,492,000 acres (603,790 ha) in 1939 to 2,567,000 acres (1,038,830 ha) in 1944. Studies are inconclusive on how vital Irish food exports were to Britain, due to the difficulties in accounting for the effect of smuggling, the unreliability of statistics, and wartime censorship. While Ireland's food production was increasing, British food imports were falling; for example the UK imported 1,360,000 tons of food in August 1941, but only 674,000 tons in August 1942.

Food consumption, per capita, in Calories Irish food consumption remained high in World War II
year	Ireland	Britain	France	Germany
1934/38	3,109	3,042	2,714	2,921
1946/47	3,059	2,854	2,424	1,980

Before and during the second world war, Ireland was a net food exporter and the Irish people enjoyed a high calorie diet. (Nonetheless, the poor experienced real deprivation). Food was donated to war-refugees in Spain. The nation did need to import certain foods, such as fruits, tea and wheat. Nearly half of Ireland's wheat was imported from Canada. Domestic food production relied on imported fertilizer (Note: In June 1942 Lemass told the Dáil that there were only 42,000 acres under sugar beet, as against 73,000 in 1941; this was due to the shortage of artificial fertilizer.) and imported animal feeding stuffs. In 1940, 74,000 tons of fertilizer were imported, only 7,000 tons arrived in 1941. Similarly 5 million tons of animal feed were imported in 1940, falling to one million in 1941 and negligible quantities thereafter.

=== Imports ===
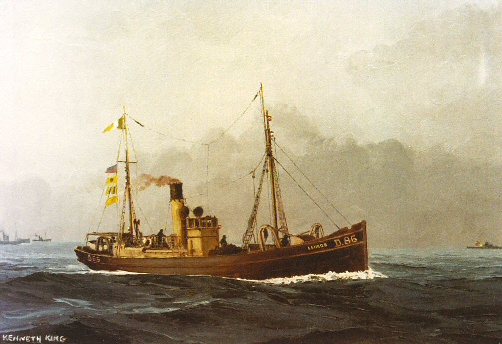
Steam fishing trawler ST Leukos was sunk by gunfire from German submarine U-38 (1938), the crew of 11 were killed - Pictured here in pre-war livery Oil by Kenneth King - National Maritime Museum

Although Ireland had a surplus of food, some foods were not grown in Ireland, as the climate was unsuitable. Only small plots of wheat were cultivated. A series of orders for compulsory tillage were enacted, (Note: at least 12.5% of all holdings over 10 acres (4.0 ha) would have to be made available for tillage) with the threat that those who did not put their fields to wheat would have their land confiscated. In 1939, 235,000 acres (95,100 ha) of wheat were planted; by 1945 this had increased to 662,000 acres (267,900 ha). Yet, a shortfall remained and imports were required.Clashes between smugglers and Customs were commonplace. In 1940 the infamous "Battle of Dowra" took place on the border of counties Leitrim and Fermanagh. Revenue crews from Blacklion and Glenfarne intercepted over one hundred men with donkey loads of smuggled flour. Unwilling to part with their bounty, the smugglers used cudgels, boots, stones and fists in the ensuing struggle. Most of the flour was destroyed in the fray and some Revenue people were injured.

Early in 1942, the Allies restricted wheat deliveries to Ireland. In return, the Irish threatened to withhold the export of Guinness beer. To the great annoyance of David Gray, the United States Ambassador to Ireland, (Note: David Gray was not titled 'ambassador', but "Envoy Extraordinary and Minister Plenipotentiary".) Ireland received 30,000 tons of wheat. Gray complained of a waste of "a vital necessity for what Americans regard at the best as a luxury and at worst a poison".

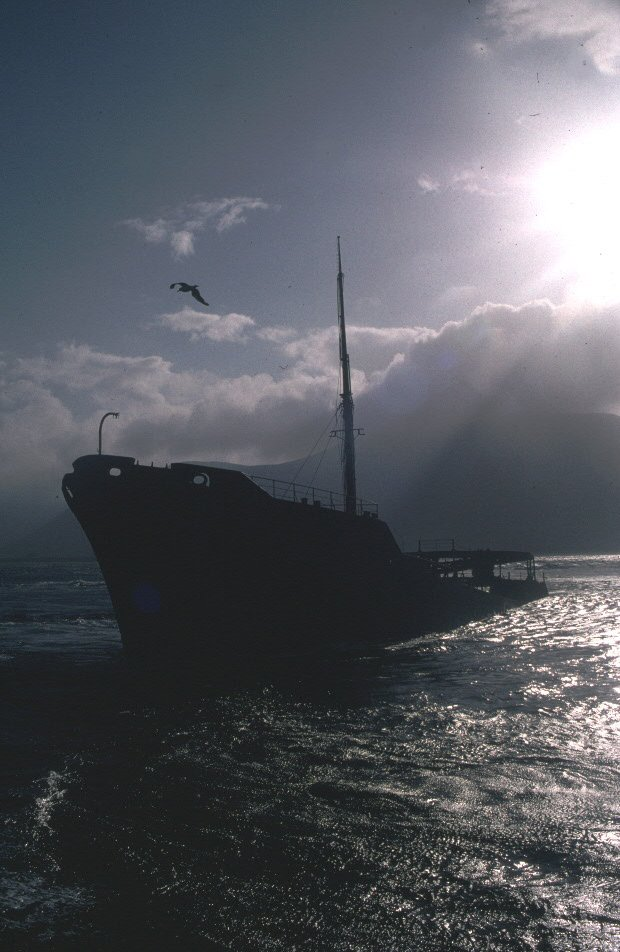
Inverlane before her wreck finally collapsed in 2000

By 1944–45 coal imports were only one-third of those of 1938-39 and supplies of oil had almost ceased. The production of town gas, manufactured from imported coal, was so adversely affected that regulations were brought in limiting its use, enforced by the "Glimmer Man". Britain relaxed these restrictions from 19 July 1944.

There were plans to build an oil refinery in Dublin. (Note: The oil refinery was to be built on right side Alexandra Road, going towards ferry port, beyond ocean pier.) In the event, this refinery was not completed. Nonetheless, seven oil tankers were built in Bremen-Vegesack, Germany for Inver Tankers Ltd. Each 500 feet (150 m) long and capable of carrying 500 tons were on the Irish register.

Britain asked Ireland to requisition the tankers, The reply was that it was not Irish policy to requisition vessels, instead offering to transfer them to the British register. They were transferred on the 6th, war had been declared on the 3rd. (Note: (from Admiralty archives) "The Eire government attached no conditions of any kind to the transfer of flag and were most helpful and gave every assistance in securing the use of the ships for His Majesty's government".)

In a manner reminiscent of Chamberlain's handover of the ports to de Valera, two days after the outbreak of war, de Valera himself transferred the tankers to the British registry without getting any promise of fuel supply in return. (Note: Dwyer says that there was an agreement, but Britain violated it.)

Two days after the transfer, on 11 September 1939, while still flying the Irish tricolour, Inverliffey was sunk. In spite of Captain William Trowsdale's protestation that they were Irish, U-38 said that they "were sorry" but they would sink Inverliffey as she was carrying petrol to England, considered contraband to the Germans. (Note: The crew took to the lifeboats. Inverliffey burned fiercely, endangering the lifeboats. At risk to herself, U-38 approached and threw lines to the lifeboats and towed them to safety. As Captain Trowsdale's lifeboat was damaged, they were allowed to board the U-boat. The captain did not have a lifebelt, so he was given one. The crew were transferred to the neutral American tanker R.G. Stewart. Neither Inverliffey nor U-38 would have been aware of the registry change.) U-38's next encounter with the Irish tricolour was less gallant. U-38 shelled the fishing trawler Leukos, all 11 crew were lost. (Note: Later U-38 landed Walter Simon, alias "Karl Anderson", a Nazi agent, at Dingle Bay in Ireland on the night of 12 June 1940. He was promptly arrested.) Inver Tankers' entire fleet was lost in the war. (Note: These tankers, because of their cargo, were highly combustible when attacked. Inversuir was in ballast (empty) when torpedoed by U-48, which then surfaced and fired 51 rounds from the deck gun, without sinking her. Three hours later U-48 fired another torpedo and left, leaving Inversuir still afloat. The next night she was sunk by U-75 Inverlane became a popular dive site She was still visible above the water until a storm on 29 January 2000, Inverlane finally sank below the waves. Inverdargle hit a mine laid by U-32, Inverilen, Inverlee, and Invershannon were torpedoed.)

== U-boat encounters ==
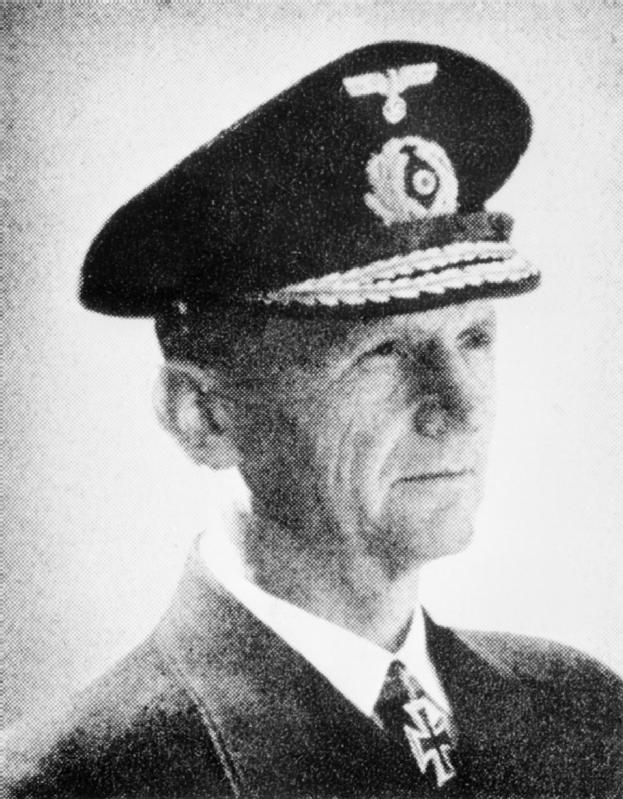
Vizeadmiral Karl Dönitz, commander of German U-boats (BdU), 1935–1943; Commander-in-Chief of the German Navy, 1943–1945.

Vizeadmiral Karl Dönitz issued a standing order to U-boats on 4 September 1940, which defined belligerent, neutral and friendly powers. Neutral included "Ireland in particular". The order concluded: "Ireland forbids the navigation of her territorial waters by warships under threat of internment. That prohibition is to be strictly observed out of consideration for the proper preservation of her neutrality. Signed, Dönitz". However those orders did not always protect Irish ships. Wolf Jeschonnek, commander of U-607 was mildly reprimanded "An understandable mistake by an eager captain" for sinking Irish Oak. When U-46 sank Luimneach on the Lisbon run, her commander recorded in his war diary "flying a British or Irish flag". A supplement to Dönitz's order found after U-260 was scuttled off Cork read: "for political reasons, Irish ships and also at times Irish convoys are not to be attacked within the blockade zone if they are seen to be such. However, there is no special obligation to determine neutrality in the blockade zone.".

There were many encounters with U-boats, some pleasant, others not so. On 16 March 1942 the Estonian ship leased her to Irish Shipping, Irish Willow was stopped by U-753, which signalled "Send master and ship's papers". As Capt Shanks hailed from Belfast and therefore legally a British subject, this was considered unwise. Chief Officer Harry Cullen and four crew rowed to the U-boat. He said that his (39-year-old) captain was too elderly for the boat. He added that it would be Saint Patrick's Day in the morning. They were treated to schnapps in the conning tower and given a bottle of cognac to bring back to Irish Willow. Later, Irish Willow performed a dangerous rescue of 47 British sailors from Empire Breeze. (Note: Empire Breeze, a British ship, was in convoy ON 122 with fog closing in, when she was torpedoed by both U-176 and U-438, the rest of the convoy ON 122 sailed on, as nine u-boats were stalking them. Irish Willow answered the SOS. She was in danger of collision because of the dense fog. 47 crew of Empire Breeze were rescued; one was lost.)

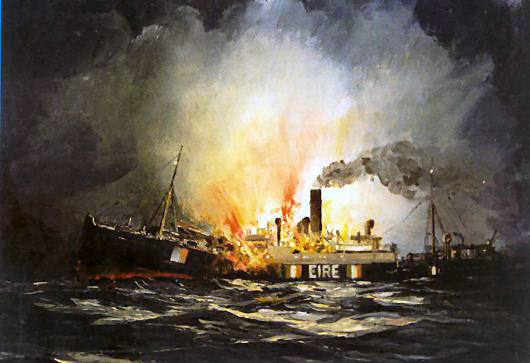
Ardmore torpedoed, 11 November 1940. All 18 crew were killed. Oil by Kenneth King – National Maritime Museum of Ireland

On 20 March 1943 U-638, commanded by Kapitänleutnant Heinrich Oskar Bernbeck stopped Irish Elm. Rough seas prevented Elm's crew from pulling their rowboat alongside the submarine to present their papers, so the interview was conducted by shouting. In the course of the conversation, Elm's Chief Officer Patrick Hennessy gave Dún Laoghaire as his home address. Bernbeck asked if "the strike was still on in Downey's", a pub near Dún Laoghaire harbour. (The Downey's strike started in March 1939 and lasted 14 years.)

== Convoys ==
The Irish and British authorities co-operated in the chartering of ships. They made combined purchases of wheat, maize, sugar, animal feeds and petrol. At the start of the war, Irish ships joined convoys protected by the Royal Navy. The advantages were protection and cheaper insurance. These advantages were not borne out by experience. So they chose to sail alone.

The ability to insure ships, cargo, and crew has a significant impact on the profitability of shipping. Insurance of Irish ships in the 'Long Watch' was problematic. One important aspect of this was that Irish ships usually didn't travel in convoy and insurers such as Lloyd's of London charged a higher premium to insure ships not in convoy. An example of the insurance problems faced, concerns the crew of City of Waterford. When this ship joined Convoy OG 74, the lives of the crew were insured. The ship suffered a collision with the Dutch tugboat Thames, and sank. Waterford's crew was rescued by HMS Deptford and then transferred to the rescue ship Walmer Castle. Walmer Castle was bombed two days later and five of City of Waterford's survivors died. When their families made life insurance claims, they were refused, because at their time of death they were not crew of City of Waterford, but passengers of Walmer Castle. Later the Irish government introduced a compensation scheme for seamen lost or injured on Irish ships and Irish Shipping opened its own marine insurance subsidiary, which made a handsome profit. (Note: After the war Irish Shipping sold its insurance subsidiary as the Insurance Corporation of Ireland, which was later taken over by Allied Irish Banks.)

Two Limerick Steamship Company ships, Lanahrone and Clonlara were part of the "nightmare convoy" OG 71, which left Liverpool on 13 August 1941. As merchant ships of a neutral country the Limerick ships had no blackout facilities, and the Master of the British Convoy Commodore's ship, the liner Aguila, objected that this would make the convoy visible to the enemy at night. In an apparently vain attempt to make them less visible, the vice admiral who was Convoy Commodore positioned the two Irish ships in the centre of the convoy. On 19 August in separate attacks the Norwegian destroyer HNoMS Bath was drawn away from the convoy and sunk by U-204, and three minutes later U-559 sank the British merchant ship Alva. Clonlara rescued 13 survivors from Alva. Two hours later U-201 sank the Commodore ship Aguila and the British cargo ship Ciscar. Two days later U-564 sank Clonlara. The Flower-class corvette HMS Campion rescued 13 survivors (eight from Clonlara, five from Alva). Eight merchant ships, two naval escorts and over 400 lives were lost. (Note: Over 400 were lost, including 152 from the commodore ship Aguila. They included the 22 "lost wrens" who were en route to Gibraltar. After this, Wrens (Women's Royal Naval Service) were never sent again on passenger liners in convoys, but transported on HM ships.)

Five of the convoy's surviving merchant ships reached Gibraltar; 10 retreated to neutral Portugal. This was described as "a bitter act of surrender could ever come our way". In Lisbon Lanahrone's crew went on strike, which was resolved with extra life-rafts and pay. The crew of Irish Poplar was waiting in Lisbon; (Note: The Greek ship Vassilious Destounis was abandoned when attacked. Enterprising Spanish fishermen brought her into Avilés and were awarded salvage by Spain. Irish Shipping bought the ship and renamed her Irish Poplar. A crew, under Capt. Matt Morgan, was dispatched to bring her to Dublin with a cargo of wheat. The Spanish authorities learnt that Des Brannigan was a member of that crew, and declared him a persona non grata as he had engaged in gun-running to the Republicans in the Spanish Civil War. They had to divert to Lisbon and a Spanish crew was recruited to bring Irish Poplar to Lisbon.) when the remnants of OG 71 limped in. The crew of Irish Poplar resolved to sail home alone. While City of Dublin brought Clonlara's survivors to Cork, Lanahrone joined Convoy HG 73. Nine of the 25 ships in that convoy were lost. These experiences and the inability of the Royal Navy to protect merchant ships had a most profound effect on all Irish Ships. Thereafter they were blacked out when sailing in Allied convoys. Ship-owners, on the advice of their masters, decided not to sail their vessels in British convoys and by the early months of 1942 the practice had ceased.

Captain William Henderson of Irish Elm, returning from a transatlantic voyage reported "circled by two German bombers, probably Condors, they circled for a considerable time and inspected closely but didn't molest. The incident had given the crew great confidence in the protection afforded by the neutral markings".

== Trade routes ==
=== British routes ===
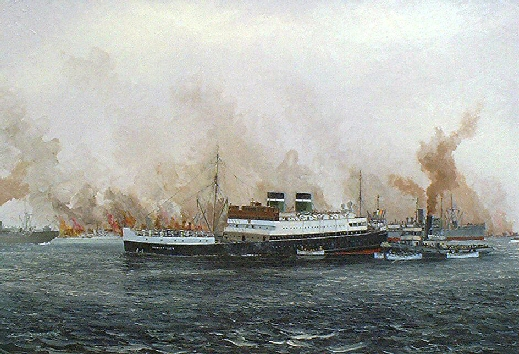
Innisfallen mined and sunk leaving Liverpool for Dublin, 21 Dec 1940. Of the 220 aboard, 4 died. - Oil by Kenneth King – National Maritime Museum of Ireland

This "cross-channel" trade accounted for most (Note: Britain accounted for half of imports and almost all exports, see www.cso.ie) of Ireland's trade. The ships ranged, in age, from Dundalk, built two years before the start of the war in 1937, to Brooklands built in 1859. The most important vessels to Ireland were the ten colliers and to Britain the livestock carriers. Initially Germany respected the neutrality of Irish vessels, apologising for the first attack on the collier Kerry Head and paying compensation. Losses came from mines, rather than direct attacks. Meath suffered such a fate; while she was being inspected by the British Naval Control Service, she was struck by a magnetic mine, drowning seven hundred cattle, and destroying both vessels.

In August 1940 Germany "required" Ireland to cease food exports to Britain. On 17 August 1940, Germany declared a large area around Britain to be a "scene of warlike operations". It was believed that attacks on Irish ships and the bombing of Campile was to reinforce that message. Lord Haw-Haw in a broadcast on German, threatened that Dundalk would be bombed if the export of cattle to Britain continued. On 24 July 1941, George's Quay, Dundalk was bombed. Nonetheless, the trade continued.

The first attack, after the German ultimatum, was against the schooner Lock Ryan, returning to Arklow. She was strafed and bombed by three German aircraft. Fortunately Lock Ryan's cargo of china clay absorbed the blast and although badly damaged, she survived. Germany acknowledged the attack but refused to pay compensation for the damage as she was in "the blockaded area", "through which the Irish had been offered free passage but on terms which were rejected". There were many attacks on ships on the cross-channel trade. In 1940 nine Irish ships were lost. (Note: February 2: Munster; 9 March: Leukos; 15 July: City of Limerick; 15 August: Meath; 22 October: Kerry Head; 11 November: Ardmore ; 19 December: Isolda; 21 December: Innisfallen.) That figure may be small compared with Allied losses, but it represents a larger proportion of the small Irish fleet.

There were restrictions on reporting attacks on ships. Frank Aiken, the Minister for the Co-ordination of Defensive Measures, whose responsibilities included censorship, reverted this policy. His intention was to let Germany know that the Irish public know, and "they don't like it". There had been a British proposal for transshipment. (Note: The transshipment proposal was for British north-American convoys to terminate at ports in the west of Ireland and their cargo transported overland to ports on Ireland's east coast for onward shipment to Britain. Ireland's transport infrastructure was woefully inadequate.) William Warnock, the Irish chargé d'affaires in Berlin told Germany that Ireland was refusing to transship British cargoes, while protesting against the attacks on Irish ships, and other neutral ships with Irish cargoes. Deliberate attacks on cross-channel shipping ceased on 5 November 1941, (Note: Alternatively, this cessation could have been because Germany put a higher priority on attacking convoys bound for Malta or Murmansk) when the collier Glencree was strafed. (Note: A later loss was from "natural causes", Lock Ryan was wrecked in a storm, on 7 March 1942.) There were attacks on other routes. Mines were a constant danger.

=== The Iberian trade ===
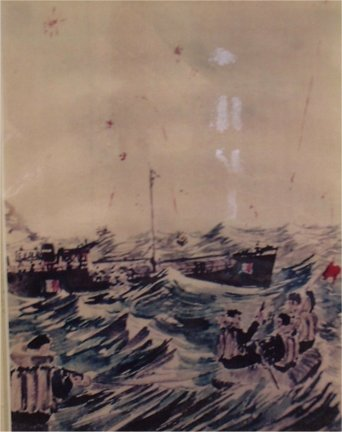
On 29 Dec 1943, while returning on the "Lisbon run" the 142 feet (43 m) long Kerlogue rescued 168 German sailors. This sketch was drawn by Hans Helmut Karsch, one of the rescued, while interned in the Curragh.National Maritime Museum of Ireland

In November 1939, Roosevelt signed the Fourth Neutrality Act forbidding American ships from entering the "war zone", which was defined as a line drawn from Spain to Iceland. Cargoes intended for Ireland were shipped to Portugal. It was up to the Irish to fetch them from there. This route, known as the Iberian Trade or the Lisbon run. Setting sail from Ireland, the ships would carry agricultural products to the United Kingdom. There they would discharge their cargo, load up on fuel, pick up a British export (often coal), and carry it to Portugal. In Portugal, usually Lisbon, Irish ships loaded the waiting American cargo, such as fertilizer or agricultural machinery.

Sometimes the cargo was not there: it may have been delayed, or lost at sea due to the war. In this case, the Irish captains would load a "cargo of opportunity" and bring it back to Ireland. This might be wheat or oranges; on occasions, they even purchased their own cargo of coal. MV Kerlogue was fortunate to have a cargo of coal when two unidentified aircraft attacked her with cannon fire. The shells lodged in the coal, rather than piercing her hull. Kerlogue eventually managed to limp back to Cobh, and when the coal she was transporting was discharged, shell fragments of British origin were found within. The unknown aircraft were later discovered to be de Havilland Mosquitos of the No. 307 Polish Night Fighter Squadron. When the British government was informed of the matter, they authorised ex gratia payments to the injured crew. (Note: The British Naval Attaché in Dublin reported to the Director of Naval Intelligence that it was "unfortunate from a British point of view" that Fortune (Captain of Kerlogue) had been involved in the Kerlogue incident as he was "always ready to pass on any information in his possession". In a damning indictment an Admiralty official concluded "there was nothing very suspicious about the ship and anyone but Polish pilots would have hesitated to attack without inquiring at base".) The Cymric was not so fortunate, vanishing in the same waters without a trace.

The Lisbon run was undertaken by small coastal trading vessels, commonly called coasters, which were not designed for deep-sea navigation. Small, and having low freeboard (frequently around one foot (30 cm)) these ships were designed never to be out of sight of land, and to be able to make quickly to a harbour when the weather turned foul. Kerlogue has become the exemplar of the Irish Mercantile Marine in the Emergency. Only 335 gross register tons (GRT) and 142 feet (43 m) long, Kerlogue was attacked by both sides and rescued both sides. Her rescue of 168 German sailors, given her size, was dramatic. From January 1941, British authorities required Irish ships to visit a British port and obtain a "navicert". This visit sometimes proved fatal. It also added up to 1,300 miles (2,100 km) to the voyage. A ship with a "navicert" was given free passage through allied patrols and fuel, however they would be searched. Irish ships on the "Lisbon run" carried UK exports to Spain and Portugal.

=== Atlantic routes ===
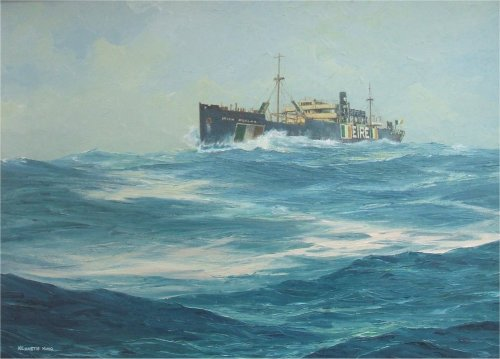
Irish Poplar, the first ship to be acquired by Irish Shipping. She transported wheat to Ireland. Oil by Kenneth King, National Maritime Museum of Ireland

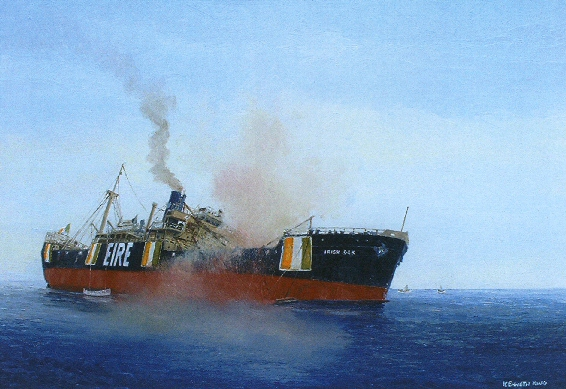
Torpedoed in mid-Atlantic in controversial circumstances, after eight hours the crew were rescued by Irish Plane. Pictured just after the first torpedo struck, the first lifeboat has just been lowered. Irish Oak. Oil by Kenneth King, National Maritime Museum of Ireland

Some British ships traded between Ireland and Britain. Other destinations were served by Irish and other neutral ships. Philip Noel-Baker (Churchill's Parliamentary Secretary) was able to tell the British parliament that "no United Kingdom or Allied ship has been lost while carrying a full cargo of goods either to or from Eire on an ocean voyage." He added "a very high proportion of imports from overseas sources into Eire, and of such exports as are sent overseas from Eire, are already carried in ships on the Eire or on a neutral register." and "The trade between Great Britain and Eire is of mutual benefit to both countries, and the risks to British seamen which it involves are small."

In the economic depression, the Limerick Steamship Company sold both its ocean-going ships, Knockfierna and Kilcredane. They were Ireland's last ocean-going ships. At the outbreak of hostilities Ireland did not have a ship designed to cross the Atlantic. British ships were not available. American ships would only travel to Portugal. Ireland depended on other neutrals. In 1940 a succession of these ships, from Norway, (Note: 17 January 1940 Enid (Captain Wibe) of neutral Norway sailing from Steinkjer to Dublin, 10 miles north of Shetland, went to assist SS Polzella (British) which had been torpedoed by German submarine U-25 (1936), U-25 then shelled and sank Enid. Enid's crew survived. Polzella's crew were lost.) Greece, (Note: 10 June 1940, Violando N Goulandris of then-neutral Greece sailing from Santa Fe to Waterford with a cargo of wheat was torpedoed by U-48 off Cape Finisterre 6 died 22 survived.) Argentina, (Note: 27 May 1940, Uruguay of neutral Argentina sailing from Rosario to Limerick with 6,000 tons of maize, sunk by scuttling charges by U-37 160 miles from Cape Villano, Costa da Morte, Spain 43.40°N 12.16°W. 15 died, 13 survived.) and Finland, (Note: 10 July 1940: Petsamo of Finland, inward Rosario to Cork with a cargo of maize, torpedoed and sunk by U-34, four died) usually carrying wheat to Ireland, were lost. Soon many of these nations were no longer neutral. Ireland had to acquire its own fleet. Irish Shipping was formed. Irish Poplar was Irish Shipping's first ship. It was acquired in Spain after it had been abandoned by its crew. Other ships were acquired from Palestine, Panama, Yugoslavia, and Chile. Frank Aiken, the Minister for the Co-ordination of Defensive Measures in the Irish government, negotiated the bareboat chartering of two oil-burning steamships from the United States Maritime Commission's reserve fleet. They were both lost to U-boats. Irish Oak was sunk in controversial circumstances by U-607. All 33 crew of Irish Pine were lost when she was sunk by U-608. Three ships were from Estonia, They were in Irish ports when Estonia was annexed by the Soviet Union. Their crews refused to return to the new Estonian SSR. The ships were sold to Irish Shipping. (Note: A Soviet claim to the ownership of these vessels was rejected by the Supreme Court ... ... did not recognize the Government of the USSR as the sovereign government of Latvia and Estonia.) The SS Cetvrti (Jugoslavia) was abandoned in Dingle Bay after being strafed on 1 December 1940. She was salvaged by Fort Rannoch of the Irish Navy; she was purchased and renamed Irish Beech. An Italian ship, Caterina Gerolimich had been trapped in Dublin since the outbreak of the war. After the fall of Italian Fascism she was chartered, repaired and renamed Irish Cedar. When the war was over, she returned to Naples with a cargo of food, a gift from Ireland to war-ravaged Italy. Irish Hazel was bought on 17 June 1941. She was 46 years old, and required extensive repairs. "She was fit for nothing but the scrap yard." A British yard bid for, and won, the contract to renovate her. This work was completed in November 1943. Even though the Irish government paid for her purchase and for the repairs she was requisitioned by the British Ministry of War Transport and renamed Empire Don. (Note: "In allowing the Irish to take over the Italian ship, the British felt that they could hold on to Irish Hazel", Alternatively, Pat Sweeney points out that the ship was on the British register since 1933 and had transferred to Panama in 1940. "It is possible that she changed flag without the permission of the British authorities and this caused her to be reclaimed") She was returned to Irish Shipping in 1945. (Note: In 1945, the Irish Hazel was returned to Irish Shipping Ltd. She was sold in 1949 to Turk Silepcilik Limited of Turkey and renamed Uman. She ran aground on 6 January 1960 at Kefken Point, Black Sea, and was a total loss.)

The Irish Shipping fleet imported, across the Atlantic: 712,000 tons of wheat, 178,000 tons of coal, 63,000 tons of phosphate (for fertilizer), 24,000 tons of tobacco, 19,000 tons of newsprint, 10,000 tons of timber and 105,000 tons of assorted other cargo. Figures from the other shipping companies have not survived.

== After the war ==
When the hostilities were over, on 16 May 1945, Éamon de Valera, in his speech to the nation said: "To the men of our Mercantile Marine who faced all the perils of the ocean to bring us essential supplies, the nation is profoundly grateful." The Ringsend area of Dublin has a long maritime tradition. When housing was being redeveloped in the 1970s, some streets were named after ships which were lost: Breman Road, Breman Grove, Cymric Road, Isolda Road, Pine Road, Leukos Road, Kyleclare Road and Clonlara Road. The "An Bonn Seirbhíse Éigeandála" for "An tSeirbhís Mhuir-Thráchtála" or in English: "Emergency Service Medal" of the "Mercantile Marine Service", was awarded to all who had served six months, or longer, on an Irish-registered ship in the Emergency.

On 24 September 2001, a plinth and plaque, embossed with the Irish tricolour was erected to commemorate those crews lost on neutral Irish registered vessels in 1939–45. "a very significant gesture by our British friends towards recognising the debt of honour owed to all shipmates irrespective of nationality who lost their lives in the Second World War." in the National Memorial Arboretum in England.

In Dublin, an annual commemoration, is held on the third Sunday of November. The Cork commemoration is held on the fourth Sunday of November in the former offices of the White Star Line. The Belfast commemoration is held on the second Sunday of May.

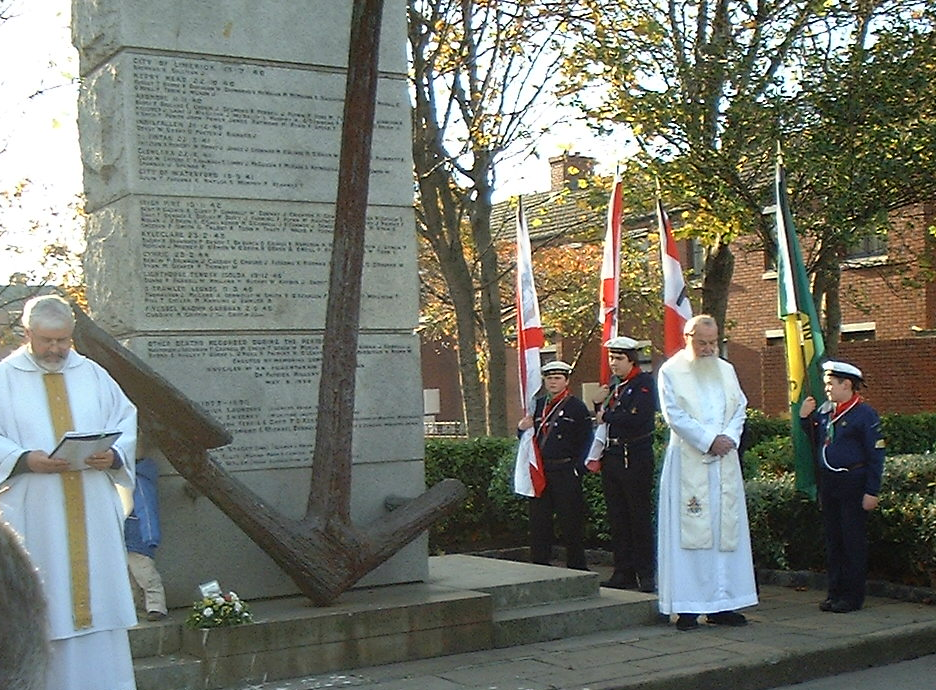
Dublin Memorial, in 1991, the "Seamens' Memorial", a 20-foot high monolith of Wicklow granite was erected.
The names of those lost on Irish registered ships in World War II are inscribed on it.

Third Sunday in November
It is the site of an annual commemoration, sponsored by the Maritime Institute of Ireland, for all those who died at sea, particularly on Irish ships in the emergency.

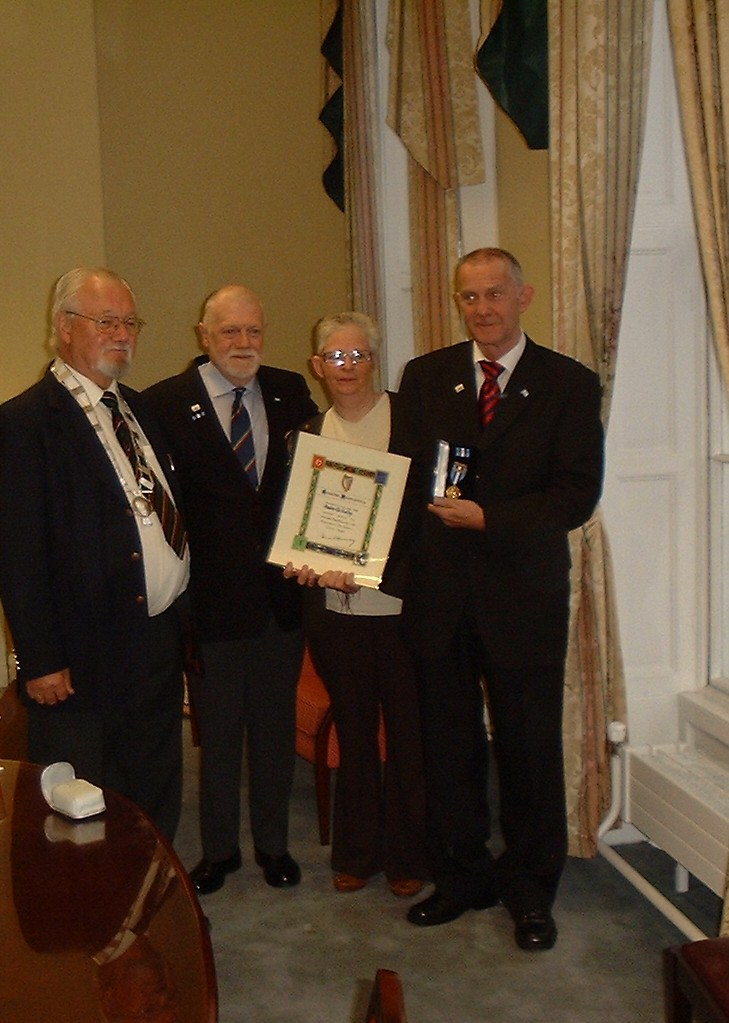
Eoghan Ganly, President of the Maritime Institute of Ireland (wearing chain of office) at Medal presentation to the grandchildren of Timoteo McCarthy, an Argentine national who served on a number of Irish ships in the war.

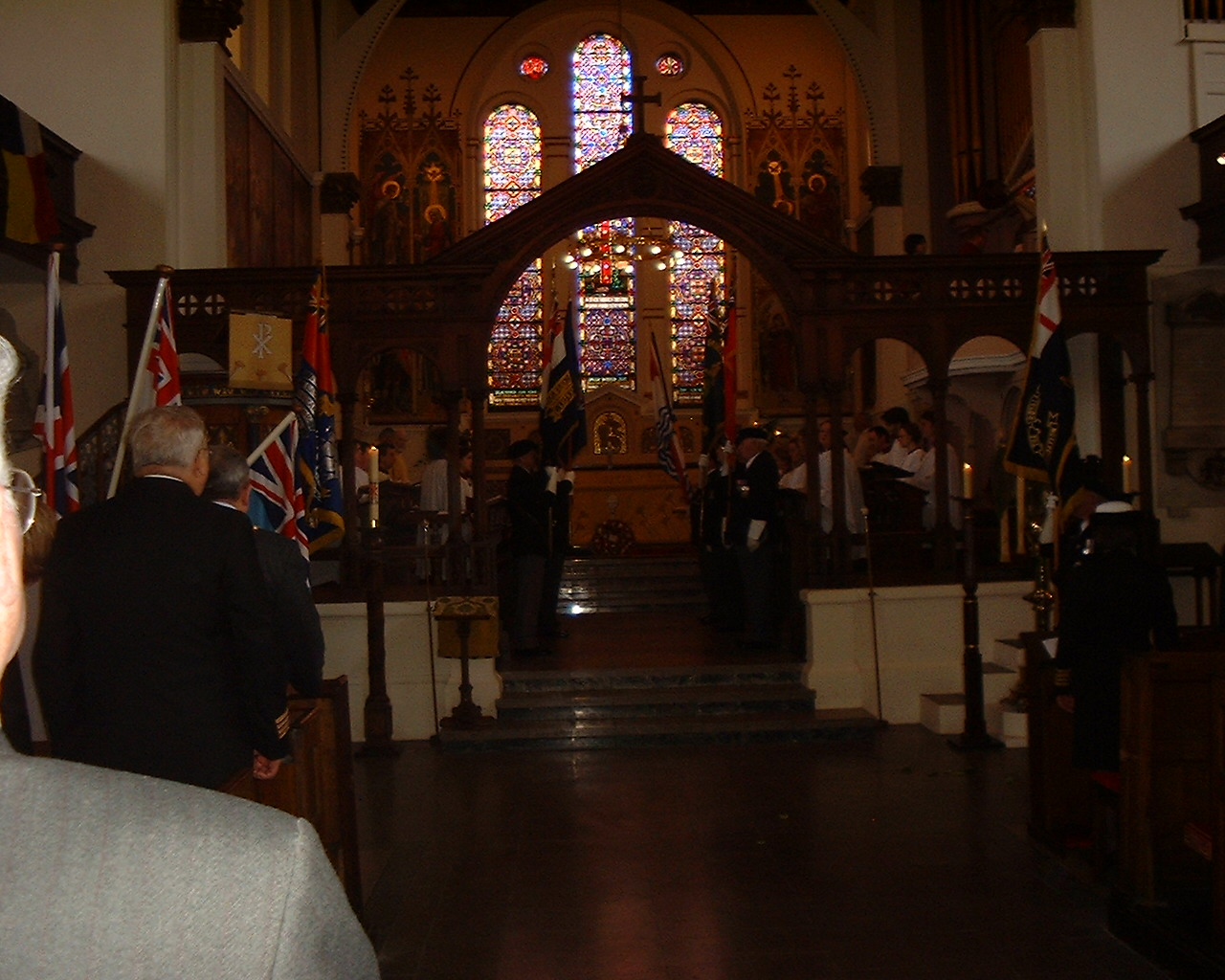
Belfast Commemoration
On the second Sunday every May, a commemoration, sponsored by the British Merchant Navy Association is held for "those who have no grave but the sea", particularly in the Battle of the Atlantic.

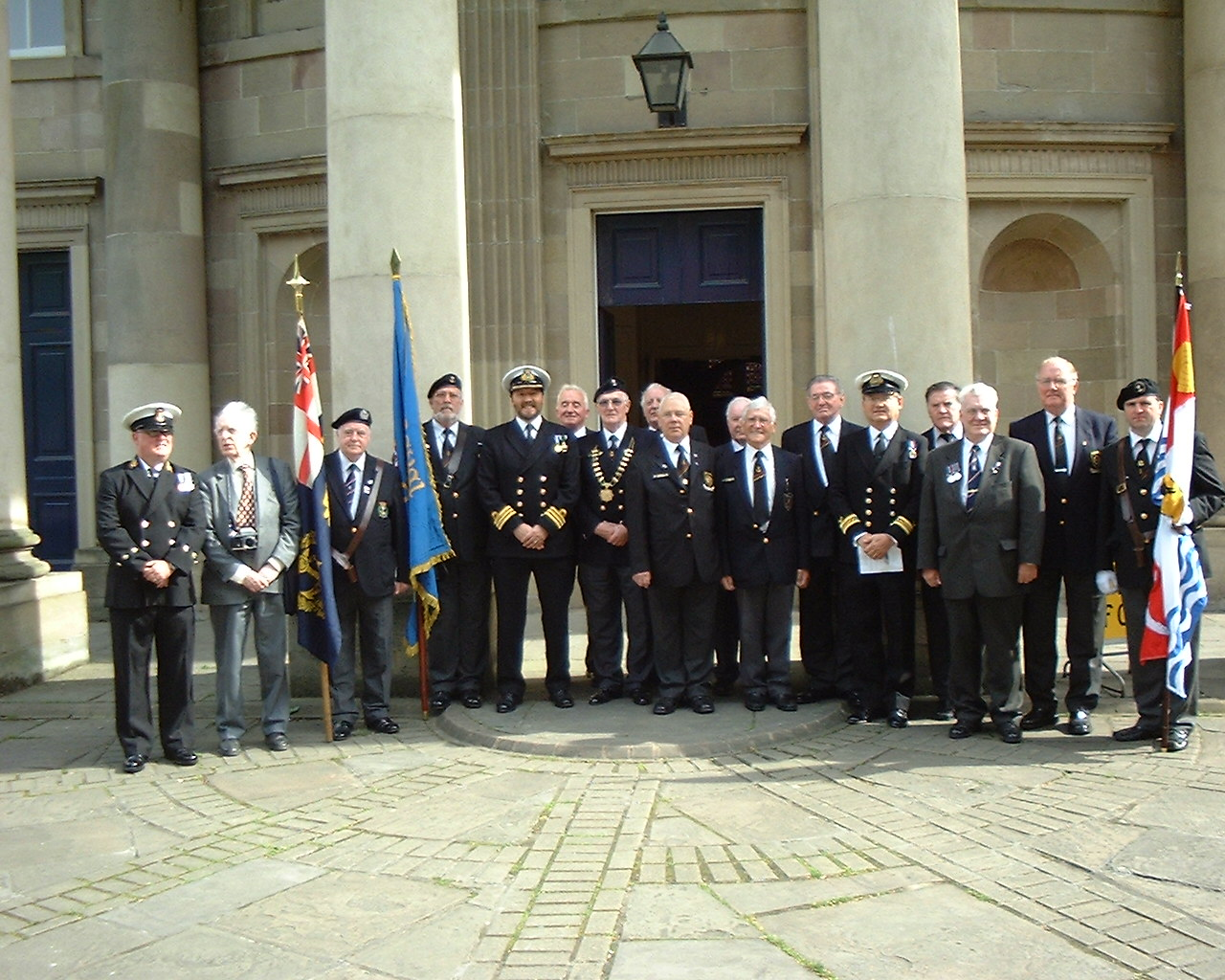
Dublin members of the Merchant Navy Association, Irish Naval Association, Maritime Institute of Ireland and the Royal Naval Association (Dublin) attending the Belfast Commemoration

== Ships ==
Irish Merchant Marine during the Emergency
Owner	Boat	Date
Arklow Schooners (Note: Some Arklow ships sailed under the red ensign and are not listed here.)	Agnes Craig	
Arklow Schooners	Antelope	
Arklow Schooners	Cymric	24 Feb 1944
Arklow Schooners	de Wadden	
Arklow Schooners	Gaelic	
Arklow Schooners	Happy Harry	
Arklow Schooners	Harvest King (Note: Featured in the film Moby Dick.)	
Arklow Schooners	Invermore	
Arklow Schooners	J. T. & S.	
Arklow Schooners	James Postlethwaite	
Arklow Schooners	Mary B Mitchell	20 Dec 1944
Arklow Schooners	M E Johnson	
Arklow Schooners	Venturer	
Arklow Schooners	Windermere	
City of Cork Steam Packet Company	Ardmore	11 Nov 1940
City of Cork Steam Packet Company	Innisfallen	21 Dec 1940
City of Cork Steam Packet Company	Kenmare	
British and Irish Steam Packet Company	Dundalk	
British and Irish Steam Packet Company	Kilkeny	
British and Irish Steam Packet Company	Meath	16 Aug 1940
British and Irish Steam Packet Company	Munster	2 Feb 1940
British and Irish Steam Packet Company	Wicklow	
Dublin Gas Company	Glenageary	
Dublin Gas Company	Glencree	
Dublin Gas Company	Glencullen	
T Heiton & Co	St Fintan	22 Mar 1941
T Heiton & Co	St Kenneth	
T Heiton & Co	St Mungo	
Irish Shipping	Irish Alder	
Irish Shipping	Irish Ash	
Irish Shipping	Irish Beech	
Irish Shipping	Irish Cedar	
Irish Shipping	Irish Elm	
Irish Shipping	Irish Fir	
Irish Shipping	Irish Hazel	
Irish Shipping	Irish Larch	
Irish Shipping	Irish Oak	15 May 1943
Irish Shipping	Irish Pine	15 Nov 1942
Irish Shipping	Irish Plane	
Irish Shipping	Irish Poplar	
Irish Shipping	Irish Rose	
Irish Shipping	Irish Spruce	
Irish Shipping	Irish Willow	
Limerick Steamship Co	Clonlara	22 Aug 1941
Limerick Steamship Co	Kyleclare	23 Feb 1943
Limerick Steamship Co	Lanahrone	
Limerick Steamship Co	Luimneach	4 Sep 1940
Limerick Steamship Co	Maigue	4 Jan 1940
Limerick Steamship Co	Monaleen	
Limerick Steamship Co	Moyalla	
Limerick Steamship Co	Rynanna	21 Jan 1940
Palgrave Murphy	Assaroe	
Palgrave Murphy	City of Antwerp	
Palgrave Murphy	City of Bremen	2 June 1942
Palgrave Murphy	City of Dublin	
Palgrave Murphy	City of Limerick	15 Jul 1940
Palgrave Murphy	City of Waterford	19 Sep 1941
W. Herriott, Limerick	Kerry Head	22 Oct 1940
S. Lockington, Dundalk	Margaret Lockington	
R. McGowan & Sons, Tralee	Kerrymore	
P. Moloney & Co., Dungarvan	The Lady Belle	
L. Ryan, New Ross	Ellie Park	
J. Nolan, Skibbereen	Lock Ryan	7 Mar 1942
J. Creenan, Ballinacurry	Brooklands	
J. Rochford, Kilmore Quay	Crest	17 Sep 1941

== See also ==
- The Emergency (Ireland) - internal, national issues in World War II
- Irish neutrality during World War II - international relations
- MV Kerlogue - the exemplar of neutral Irish ships in World War II.
- Battle of the Atlantic

== Publications ==
- Anderson, Ernest (1951). Sailing Ships of Ireland. Morris.
- Barton, Brian (1995). Northern Ireland in the Second World War. Ulster Historical Foundation. ISBN 978-0-901905-69-7.
- Bell, Jonathan; Watson, Mervyn (2008). A History of Irish Farming. Dublin: Four Courts Press. ISBN 978-1-84682-096-0.
- Benson, Asher (2007). Jewish Dublin. A&A Farmar. ISBN 978-1-906353-00-1.
- Blair, Clay (1996). Hitler's U-Boat War. London: Weidenfeld & Nicolson. ISBN 0-297-84076-2.
- Burne, Lester H (2003). Dean Burns, Richard (ed.). Chronological History of U.S. Foreign Relations: 1932–1988. Vol. 2. Routledge. ISBN 978-0-415-93916-4.
- Carroll, Joseph T (1998). Ireland in the war years. International Scholars Publications. ISBN 978-1-57309-186-2.
- Coogan, Tim Pat (1995). De Valera. London: Arrow Books. ISBN 0-09-995860-0.
- Coogan, Tim Pat (2003). Ireland in the Twentieth Century. London: Hutchinson. ISBN 0-09-179427-7.
- Duggan, John P (1985). Neutral Ireland and the Third Reich. Gill and Macmillan. ISBN 978-0-389-20598-2.
- Duggan, John P (2003). Herr Hempel. Irish Academic Press. ISBN 0-7165-2757-X.
- Dwyer, T Ryle (1982). De Valera's Finest Hour. Cork: Mercier Press. ISBN 0-85342-675-9.
- Dwyer, T Ryle (1988). Strained relations: Ireland at peace and the USA at war, 1941-45. Rowman & Littlefield. ISBN 978-0-7171-1580-8.
- Dwyer, T Ryle (1977). Irish neutrality and the USA, 1939-47. Gill and Macmillan. ISBN 978-0-87471-994-9.
- Dwyer, T Ryle (2009). Behind the Green Curtain - Ireland's Phoney Neutrality During World War II. Dublin: Gill and Macmillan. ISBN 978-0-7171-4638-3.
- Ferriter, Diarmaid (2007). Judging DeV. Dublin: Royal Irish Academy. ISBN 978-1-904890-28-7.
- Ferriter, Diarmaid (2006). What If? Alternative Views of Twentieth-Century Ireland. Gill & Macmillan. ISBN 978-0-7171-3990-3.
- Fisk, Robert (1983). In Time of War. London: André Deutsch. ISBN 0-233-97514-4.
  (Later republished as:Fisk, Robert (1996). In Time of War: Ireland, Ulster and the Price of Neutrality, 1939-45. Gill & Macmillan Ltd. ISBN 978-0-7171-2411-4.)
- Fitzgerald, John (2008). Are We Invaded Yet?. Cork: Callan Press.
- Forde, Frank (2000) [1981]. The Long Watch. Dublin: New Island Books. ISBN 1-902602-42-0.
- Forde, Frank (1988). Maritime Arklow. Dún Laoghaire: Glendale Press. ISBN 0-907606-51-2.
- Gerwarth, Robert (2007). Twisted paths: Europe 1914–1945. Oxford University Press. ISBN 978-0-19-928185-5.
- Gilligan, H.A. (1988). A History of the Port of Dublin. Dublin: Gill and Macmillan. ISBN 0-7171-1578-X.
- Gleichauf, Justin (2002). Unsung Sailors. Bluejacket Books. ISBN 978-1-55750-420-3.
- Gray, Tony (1997). The Lost Years. London: Little Brown and Company. ISBN 0-316-88189-9.
- Griven, Brian (2006). The Emergency. London: Macmillan. ISBN 978-1-4050-0010-9.
- Johnston, Roy (2003). Century of Endeavour. Irish research series. Vol. 46. Academica Press. ISBN 978-1-930901-76-6.
- Kennedy, Michael (2008). Guarding Neutral Ireland. Dublin: Four Courts Press. ISBN 978-1-84682-097-7.
- Lee, Joseph (1989). Ireland 1912–1985. Cambridge University Press. ISBN 9780521377416.
- Lund, Paul; Ludlam, Harry; Shuttleworth, Tom (1987). Nightmare Convoy. Foulsham. ISBN 978-0-572-01452-0.
- MacAonghusa, Proinsias (1983). Quotations from Eamon de Valera. Dublin: Mercier Press. ISBN 0-85342-684-8.
- MacGinty, Tom (1995). The Irish Navy. Tralee: The Kerryman. ISBN 0-946277-22-2.
- Manning, Maurice (1971). Blueshirts. University of Toronto Press. ISBN 978-0-8020-1787-1.
- Mason, Ursula (1992). Britannia's daughters: the story of the WRNS. Barnsley: Leo Cooper. ISBN 978-0-85052-271-6.
- McIvor, Aidan (1994). A History of the Irish Naval Service. Dublin: Irish Academic Press. ISBN 0-7165-2523-2.
- McMahon, Sean (2009). Bombs over Dublin. Dublin: Currach Press. ISBN 978-1-85607-983-9.
- McRonald, Malcolm (2007). The Irish Boats. Vol. 3, Liverpool to Belfast. Tempus. ISBN 978-0-7524-4235-8.
- Monsarrat, Nicholas (1970). Life is a Four Letter Word. London: Cassell. ISBN 978-0-330-02294-1.
- O'Carroll, John P, ed. (1983). De Valera and his times. Murphy, John A. Cork University Press. ISBN 0-902561-26-X.
- O'Connell, Cathal (2007). The State and Housing in Ireland. Nova Science Publishers, Inc. ISBN 978-1-60021-759-3.
- Ó Gráda, Cormac (1997). A rocky road: the Irish economy since the 1920s. Insights from Economic History. Manchester: Manchester University Press. ISBN 978-0-7190-4584-4.
- Ó Drisceoil, Donal (1996). Censorship in Ireland, 1939–1945. Cork University Press. ISBN 978-1-85918-074-7.
- O'Halpin, Eunan (2008). Spying on Ireland. Oxford: Oxford University Press. ISBN 978-0-19-925329-6.
- O'Hanlon (Chairman), H.B.; Ports and Harbours Tribunal (1930). Report of the Ports and Harbours Tribunal. Dublin: Government Publications Sales Office.
- Raymond, Raymond James (1983). "Irish Economic Development". In J.P. O'Carroll and John A. Murphy (ed.). De Valera and His Times. Cork: Cork University Press. ISBN 0-902561-26-X.
- Rohwer, Jürgen (1999). Axis submarine successes of World War Two. Annapolis, MD: Naval Institute Press. ISBN 9781853673405.
- Share, Bernard (1978). The Emergency. Dublin: Gill and Macmillan. ISBN 071710916X.
- Sinclair, Andrew (2001). Blood & Kin: an empire saga. Sinclair-Stevenson. ISBN 978-0-9540476-3-4.
- Somerville-Large, Peter (2000). Irish voices: an informal history. Pimlico. ISBN 978-0-7126-6532-2.
- Spong, H.C. (1982). Irish Shipping Ltd., 1941–1982. World Ship Society. ISBN 978-0-905617-20-6.
- Stephan, Enno (1965). Spies in Ireland. London: Four Square.
- Sweeney, Pat (2010). Liffey Ships. Mercier. ISBN 978-1-85635-685-5.
- Warner, Mildred (1989). W. Lloyd Warner: Social Anthropologist. Publishing Center for Cultural Resources. ISBN 978-0-89062-234-6.
- Wills, Clair (2007). That Neutral Island. London: Faber and Faber. ISBN 978-0-571-22105-9.
- Wood, Ian (2003) [2002]. Ireland during the Second World War. London: Caxton. ISBN 1-84067-418-0.
