= SS Irish Willow =

Three steamships operated by Irish Shipping were named Irish Willow.

- SS Irish Willow (1917) – in service 1941–46
- SS Irish Willow (1948) – in service 1948–54
- SS Irish Willow (1956) – in service 1956–59
