= Irish Pine =

Irish Pine was the name of three ships operated by Irish Shipping Ltd:

- SS Irish Pine (1919)
- SS Irish Pine (1948)
- MV Irish Pine
