= SS Irish Pine =

SS Irish Pine was the name of two steamships operated by Irish Shipping:

- SS Irish Pine (1919), chartered in 1941, sunk by U-608 in 1942
- SS Irish Pine (1948), built for Irish shipping in 1948
