= SS Irish Willow (1917) =

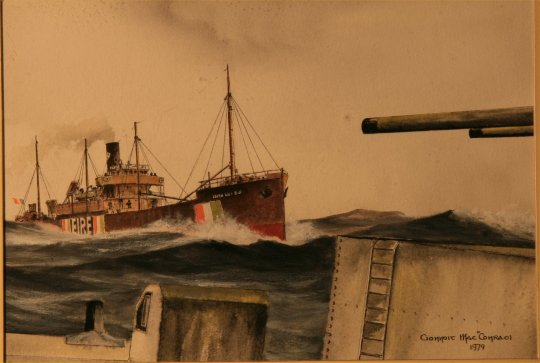
- Oil painting by Kenneth King from the deck of U-boat U-753, signalling to Irish Willow "send master and ships papers" National Maritime Museum of Ireland

History

United States
- Name: Lake Sunapee
- Owner: United States Shipping Board (1918–23)
- Operator: United States Army (1918); United States Navy (1918–1919)
- Launched: 28 December 1917
- Out of service: 1921–23

United States
- Name: Frank Lynch
- Owner: W.J. Gray, San Francisco (1923–37)

Greece
- Name: Nestor
- Owner: George D. Gratsos and Co Ltd. (1937–38)

Estonia
- Name: Otto
- Owner: K. Jurnas (1938–1946)

Ireland
- Name: Irish Willow
- Owner: K. Jurnas; M/s Egon Jurgenson (1938–1946)
- Operator: Irish Shipping Limited (1942–46)
- Route: Saint John, New Brunswick to Ireland(1942–45)
- Fate: Returned to owners 6 May 1946, then sold

Panama
- Name: Veraguas
- Owner: Cia de Vapores (1946–60)
- Fate: 26 July 1960 Broken up by J Boel et fils

General characteristics
- Type: Lake freighter
- Tonnage: 2,009 GRT; 1,197 NRT; 3,000 DWT
- Length: 252 ft (76.8 m)
- Beam: 43 ft 5 in (13.2 m)
- Depth: 18 ft 9 in (5.7 m)
- Decks: 1
- Propulsion: Triple-expansion steam engine 260nhp (1918–23); 6-cylinder 4 S.C.S.A. Werkspoor diesel engine by Pacific Diesel Engine Co, Oakland, California 253nhp (1923–38); T 3-cylinder by John Lewis and Son, Aberdeen 153nhp (1938–60)
- Capacity: 130,000 cubic feet (3,681 m^{3})

Irish Willow was one of the few ships which maintained Irish trade during World War II.

At the outbreak of World War II, sometimes referred to in Ireland as "The Emergency", Ireland declared neutrality and became isolated as never before. Although Ireland had a substantial food surplus, there were shortages of specific foods such as fruits, wheat and tea. There were very few Irish ships as shipping had been neglected since independence. Foreign ships which had transported Irish cargoes, before the war, were soon unavailable.

No country had ever been more effectively blockaded because of the activities of belligerents and our lack of ships ...

— Taoiseach (Prime Minister) Éamon de Valera, Saint Patrick's Day address 17 March 1940

Otto, an Estonian ship, was in Cobh when the Republic of Estonia was annexed by the USSR. In October 1941 trustees for the absent owners leased her to Irish Shipping. She was renamed Irish Willow, She made 18 voyages to Saint John, New Brunswick, returning with wheat. She also exported food to Britain and imported coal. Initially Irish ships sailed in British convoys. In the light of experience they chose to sail alone, relying on their neutral markings. German respect for that neutrality varied from friendly to tragic.

== Construction ==
The ship, yard number 143, was one of seven vessels under construction for the British Shipping Controller at the Toledo Shipbuilding Company, (Note: later incorporated into the American Ship Building Company) Toledo, Ohio, United States when requisitioned before completion by the United States Shipping Board (USSB) and assigned U.S. official number 216260 with signal LKQG. (Note: Official registers 1918—1920 show the U.S. official number as 216260 rather than McKellar's 216160, an apparent typo.) A Standard World War I cargo ship, she was laid down as War Flag, but named Lake Sunapee after the lake in New Hampshire. She was launched on 28 December 1917, while World War I was still in progress. The ship was a single deck vessel with a grain capacity of 130,000 cubic feet (3,681 m^{3}) and bunker capacity of 2,009 GRT. She was 252 ft (76.81 m) long, 43 ft 5 in (13.2 m) wide and 18 ft 9 in (5.7 m) deep. Her triple expansion steam engine had cylinders of 20 1/2 inches (52 cm), 33 inches (84 cm) and 45 inches (110 cm) diameter by 40 inches (100 cm) in stroke. Working at a pressure of 180 pounds per square inch (1,200 kPa), it developed 260nhp. The engine was built by Toledo Shipbuilding.

== Early history ==
As a Laker she was designed to navigate the canal locks bypassing Niagara Falls. Lake Sunapee served as a U.S. Army transport, based in Cardiff, Wales, bringing coal to France. On 19 November 1918 the ship was acquired and commissioned by the Navy at Cardiff and assigned to the Naval Overseas Transport Service (NOTS) operating between British and French ports as a coal transport. The ship departed Cardiff 7 June 1919 arriving at Hoboken, New Jersey 25 June for decommissioning and return to the USSB upon arrivaal.

There is a record that she arrived at New York from the Pará on 29 May 1920. The ship does not appear in the 1921 U.S. register but reappears in the 1923 register as Frank Lynch with home port of San Francisco. Legal notices appeared in October 1922 to the effect an application to the U.S. Customs Service from W. J. Gray to change the name of the vessel from Lake Sunapee to Frank Lynch, In November 1922 a note states that the USSB sold the ship to W. J. Gray and conversion to diesel is planned. The Navy history mentions a short name was given; however registers do not show a registered Sunapee.

Frank Lynch was built as a coal-fired steamship with a triple-expansion steam engine. In 1923 the engine was replaced with a Werkspoor diesel engine. which had 8 cylinders of 20 7/8 inches (53 cm) diameter by 35 7/16 inches (90 cm) stroke. The engine was rated at 253nhp. It was built by the Pacific Diesel Engine Company, Oakland, California. The conversion was done by the Union Construction Company of Oakland with work and trials completed on 27 February 1923.

On 29 August 1929, the passenger ship San Juan collided with the tanker S.C.T. Dodd and sank with the loss of many lives. Frank Lynch, Munami and S.C.T. Dodd rescued the survivors.

In 1937, she was sold to the Greek company George D. Gratsos' Sons, (Note: later changed to George D. Gratsos and Co. Ltd.) who renamed her Nestor. In 1938 she suffered a total engine failure and was towed to Rotterdam, South Holland, Netherlands, where she was converted back to a steamship. A replacement triple expansion steam engine was fitted. It was made by John Lewis & Son, Aberdeen, United Kingdom. It had cylinders of 19 inches (48 cm), 31 inches (79 cm) and 51 1/2 inches (131 cm) diameter by 33 inches (84 cm) stroke and was rated at 153nhp. In 1939 she was sold to K. Jurnas of Estonia and renamed Otto.

== World War II ==
=== Background ===
The Irish government had pursued a policy of autarky or self-sufficiency, so international trade was discouraged and the mercantile marine (Note: In Ireland it is the "Mercantile Marine"; in the United Kingdom, it is the "Merchant Navy"; in the USA, it is the "Merchant Marine".) ignored. At independence in 1923 there were 127 Irish ships, but by September 1939 there were only 56, including 7 which did not carry cargo. Irish imports such as wheat, maize, timber and fertilizer were carried on foreign, mainly British, ships. With the outbreak of hostilities, they were unavailable. (Note: petroleum was imported in British-flagged tankers) Churchill explained "we need this tonnage for our own supply". In November 1939, American ships were excluded from Irish waters by the neutrality act. By the end of 1940, nine Irish ships (Note: The nine Irish ships: 2 February 1940 Munster struck a mine as she approached Liverpool and sank.; 9 March 1940: Leukos sunk by gunfire from U-38 All eleven crew lost; 15 July 1940: City of Limerick bombed and sunk by the Luftwaffe in the Bay of Biscay. Two died.; 16 August 1940: Meath struck a mine in the Irish Sea and sank.; 4 September 1940: Luimneacht sunk by gunfire from U-46; 22 October 1940: Kerry Head bombed and sunk by the Luftwaffe off Cape Clear. Twelve died.; 11 November 1940: Ardmore struck a mine approaching the Bristol Channel and sank. 24 died.; 19 December 1940: Isolda, lighthouse tender bombed and sunk by the Luftwaffe. six died.; 21 December 1940: Innisfallen struck a mine approaching Liverpool and sank. four died) as well as ten neutral foreign ships carrying Irish cargoes, some of which had been chartered by Irish companies, had been sunk by U-boats, the Luftwaffe or mines. (Note: the ten foreign ships: 15 December 1939: Germaine of Greece with 7,400 tons of maize for Cork was stopped and scuttled by U-48; 27 May 1940: Uruguay of Argentina, with wheat and maize for Limerick, was stopped by U-37. She was sunk with scuttling charges, leaving the crew in two lifeboats, one was rescued by Spanish fishermen; the other, with fifteen men was never found.; 11 June 1940: Violando N Goulandris of Greece, with wheat for Waterford, was torpedoed and sunk, with the loss of six lives by U-48.; 19 June 1940: Adamandios Georgandis of Greece with a cargo of wheat for Cork was torpedoed by U-28. One died.; 29 June 1940: Frangoula B Goulandris of Greece Outward Cork to St Thomas in ballast to collect a cargo of sugar, was torpedoed and sunk by U-26; 10 July 1940: Petsamo of Finland with 4477 tons of maize and 1523 tons of grain for Cork was torpedoed and sunk by U-34, within sight of the Irish coast, off Baltimore, County Cork. Four died.; 11 July 1940: Ia of Greece with a cargo of wheat for Cork was torpedoed and sunk by U-99. Three died.; 14 July 1940: Thetis A of Greece with grain for Limerick was torpedoed and sunk by U-52. Nine died.; 17 September 1940: Tanker Kalliopi S of Greece bound for Limerick was bombed and sunk by Luftwaffe in Sheephaven Bay.; 8 October 1940: Delphin of Greece with wheat and maize for Cork was torpedoed and sunk by U-103. All survived; 8 December 1940: Sailing ship Penang of Finland with 3,193 tons of wheat for Cobh was torpedoed by U-140. All 18 crew lost.; Ireland sought an explanation for five ships from Germany "... steamships, the entire cargoes of which comprised grain for exclusive consumption in Éire were sunk by unidentified submarines ...") Against this background, the government founded Irish Shipping and sought ships which it could charter or purchase. Irish Willow was one of those ships.

=== Soviet claim ===
In June 1940 the Soviet Union occupied the Baltic states and on 6 August 1940 Estonia was annexed as the Estonian Soviet Socialist Republic. Industry was nationalised and Estonian ships were instructed to go to a Soviet port. There were several ships from the Baltic states in, or heading to, Irish ports. All ignored that instruction. Peter Kolts, a crewman of Pirer, another Estonian ship at Dublin south quays, hoisted the hammer and sickle and prevented Captain Joseph Juriska from removing it. The Garda Síochána were called. Following a court appearance before Justice Michael Lennon the sailor spent a week in jail.

The twenty Estonian ships in British ports also received this telegram. August Torma, the last Estonian envoy in London, presented their case to the Foreign Office and said that they needed reassurances if they were to stay in Britain. He failed to obtain reassurance. The majority went to the Soviet Union. Following the verdict of Justice Michael Lennon, the ships in Irish ports choose to remain.

Ivan Maisky, the Soviet ambassador to the United Kingdom, applied to the High Court in Dublin for possession of the ships. Their owners could not be contacted. The Soviet case was supported by a letter from John Whelan Dulanty, the Irish High Commissioner in London. This letter, written when the ships had been instructed to go immediately to the USSR, asked if the three ships carrying cargoes destined for Ireland, could first deliver their Irish cargo. Maisky had agreed on behalf of the Soviet Union, provided that the Irish government guaranteed that after discharging their cargo they would be given food sufficient for the journey to a Soviet port. A. K. Overend, KC, acting for Maisky, said that this established that his client was recognised by Ireland as "the proper person to give instruction to the ships", and that his client was the only claimant.

John McEvoy was the honorary consul (Note: In the high court record John McEvoy is described as "vice consul", the speech by the current President of Estonia used the title "honorary consul".) of the Republic of Estonia in Dublin. He opposed the Soviet claim along with Estonian representatives in Switzerland. (Note: In opposing the Russians in court, he took a personal financial risk. If Russia won the case, costs could have been awarded against him. As there was no Estonian government, he would have been personally liable.) Though he lacked diplomatic status, the Court recognised the right of Herbert Martinson, described as "an Estonian national, resident in Switzerland", to vindicate the rights of the absent owners; McEvoy and Martinson were recognised as trustees for the owners. The High Court considered five ships: three from Estonia, Otto, Piret and Mall, and two from Latvia, Rāmava and Everoja. McEvoy acted for the various owners of the Estonian ships. On 16 May 1941 the High Court rejected the Soviet claim. The Soviet authorities appealed against the decision to the five-judge Supreme Court. On 3 July 1941 the appeal was unanimously dismissed with costs. The Soviet Union made a 'most emphatic' protest.

Martinson leased the three Estonian vessels to Irish Shipping for the duration of the war plus three months. The two Latvian ships transferred to the British registry and sailed under the Red Ensign. Rāmava moved to Britain. Everoja remained in Ireland. (Note: Everoja carried Irish cargoes, but sailed under the Red Ensign. She was painted in camouflage, was armed, had a Royal Navy gun crew aboard, and sailed in British convoys.) Everoja was torpedoed and sunk on 3 November 1941 by U-203 while in convoy SC 52 on passage from Canada to Dublin with 6,400 tons of wheat.

John McEvoy was acting at his own expense, but the court directed that he was to be reimbursed from the income earned by Otto (Irish Willow). McEvoy's role was acknowledged by Estonia following its independence (the 'Singing Revolution'), when the President of Estonia Toomas Hendrik Ilves said: "... ... we are thankful that Ireland never recognised the illegal annexation of Estonia by the Soviet Union after the Second World War. We will never forget John McEvoy, Estonia's honorary consul in Dublin from 1938 to 1960. Among other things, one of his good deeds was helping to protect the interests of the Estonian shipowners ..."

=== Irish Willow ===
In October 1941, in Cobh, Otto was chartered by Irish Shipping. She was brought to Dublin for extensive repairs. On 5 December 1941, she made her first voyage as Irish Willow: She went from Cobh to Dublin under Captain G.R. Bryan, from Rathfarnam, previously captain of City of Dublin. H. Cullen, previously of Irish Elm, was first officer. H. Jurgenson was chief engineer; he was an Estonian national, and had been the chief engineer when she was Otto. As engine components could not be located, the repairs had to be completed in Canada. On 5 December she went on her first commercial voyage, under Captain R Shanks of Belfast, as Irish Willow. She went to Troon for fuel and then joined convoy ON 47. The convoy departed on 15 December 1941. Around this time, Irish crews were refusing to travel in convoy. Irish Willow "lost" her convoy. She arrived in Saint John on 12 January 1942 and on 22 January loaded her cargo of wheat. Repairs delayed her a further two weeks. She was scheduled to return in convoy SC 68. (Note: According to this: http://convoyweb.org.uk/sc/index.html she was in the convoy. Cleare p. 62,63 and Higgins p. 7 say she was alone. Since she saw a submarine on 3 February 1942 and there is no mention of the convoy seeing it, we can assume that she was out of convoy) Returning alone, a submarine was spotted on 3 February. There was no contact. She unloaded her cargo of wheat in Waterford on 2 March and then went again for a further wheat cargo from Saint John for Waterford. During the war, she completed 18 such voyages.

=== Encounter with U-753 ===
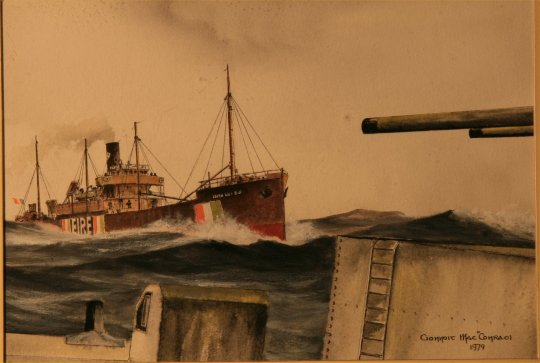
Oil painting by Kenneth King from the deck of U-753, signalling to Irish Willow "send master and ships papers" National Maritime Museum of Ireland

On the morning of 16 March 1942, U-753 sighted a lone ship, south-west of the Rockall Bank (Irish Willow), and prepared to sink her until they saw her neutral markings (the Irish tricolour and the word EIRE) At 2 pm U-753 surfaced and signalled "send master and ship's papers". As Captain Shanks was born in Belfast and could be regarded as British, this was considered unwise. Chief Officer Henry Cullen, with four crew as oarsmen went instead. In the conning tower he explained that his captain was too elderly (Note: Captain Shanks was 39 years old.) for the small boat. He spoke about Ireland's neutrality. He reminded them that the next day would be Saint Patrick's Day. He sensed that he was making progress when tumblers of schnapps were produced in honour of Saint Patrick. But then the Germans – who seemed apologetic – said that they were awaiting instructions whether or not to sink the ship; they would, however, fire a red flare five minutes beforehand if they were to sink Irish Willow. Cullen and the oarsmen returned to their ship. They were given a bottle of cognac, to take back "for the crew". There was an anxious wait until eventually the U-boat fired a green flare.

=== Rescuing the crew of Empire Breeze ===
Convoy ON 122 (Note: ON means "Outward" to "North" America) left Liverpool on 15 August 1942. Ten days later, on 25 August 1942, when they were in the mid-Atlantic, the convoy was attacked by Wolfpack Lohs. Four ships were torpedoed and sunk. (Note: Trolla (6 dead and 16 survivors), rescued by Norwegian corvette HNoMS Potentilla (K 214); Sheaf Mount (31 dead and 20 survivors), rescued by rescue ship Stockport; Katvaldis (3 dead and 40 survivors) rescued by rescue ship Stockport; Empire Breeze (1 dead and 47 survivors)) The convoy retreated into a fogbank, with visibility less than 300 metres (330 yd), probably saving further loss. The fog continued to thicken.

U-176 had hit the 7,457 ton Empire Breeze with two torpedoes. (Note: U-438 had fired a torpedo at the same time and mistakenly believed that their torpedo hit the Empire Breeze. Some sites, still credit U-438.) An SOS was transmitted and acknowledged. The 47 (Note: some sources say 48: http://uboat.net/allies/merchants/2088.html says: Complement 49 (1 dead and 48 survivors).; and also: Irish Willow found the wreck in the fog and picked up the master, 41 crew members and six gunners; http://www.warsailors.com/convoys/on122.html says: Empire Breeze was torpedoed by U-176 and U-438 on 25 Aug with the loss of 1 man, 48 survived.) surviving crew abandoned ship and took to their three lifeboats. A fourth lifeboat was destroyed during launch. One crewman died (Note: Yusuf Doalay, on duty as a fireman, died when the torpedoes hit. This was his first voyage on Empire Breeze. His previous ship had been sunk.) Empire Breeze remained afloat. The rescue ship Stockport was detailed to rescue them. Irish Willow was 45 nautical miles (83 km) to the west, too far away to help. 24 hours after the attack the crew of Empire Breeze were still in their lifeboats. Stockport had failed to locate them in the fog, so she left to rejoin the convoy. There were three radio officers. They had a portable radio transmitter in a lifeboat. Repeated SOS messages were not acknowledged. Empire Breeze was still afloat. Captain Thomson and some of the crew re-boarded. The cook prepared hot meals. Joseph Brown, a radio officer, connected their portable radio with the ship's aerial and rebroadcast the SOS. This was heard and acknowledged by Belle Isle radio station in Canada. The rescue tug HMS Frisky and the corvette HMCS Rosthern were sent to rescue and, if possible, to salvage Empire Breeze. They failed to locate her or the survivors. A serious problem was that there had been fog for the previous few days, astronomical observations had not been taken, so no ship in the area knew their exact location. The various accounts of this event give different locations: www.wrecksite.eu (from the convoy report) has 58°56′30″N 25°17′30″W. Frank Forde's book (from the log of Irish Willow) quotes 59°22′N 25°52′W.

36 hours after the attack they sent another SOS. Irish Willow heard this SOS, she responded and headed towards the scene. Irish Willow replied, asking how long they could hold out. Captain Thomson of Empire Breeze estimated six hours. Captain Shanks of Irish Willow replied "Coming to you – with you in about five hours". The fog became denser and visibility reduced to zero. Rather than plotting locations, (dead reckoning) Irish Willow was using direction finding equipment; she was travelling towards the SOS signal: It was dangerous for Irish Willow. They knew the direction to take, but did not know the distance. Travelling in fog, they could collide with Empire Breeze, or endanger survivors in the water. Extra look-outs were posted along her bow and whistles were sounded every two minutes. The repeating SOS messages could attract U-boats, seeking to "finish the job", and if such a U-boat found Irish Willow at the scene, its attitude could be quite different to that encountered on 16 March.

In dense fog the survivors were located and rescued. Irish Willow resumed her voyage to Waterford. As they rounded Hook Lighthouse they were met by the RNLI lifeboat Annie-Blanche-Smith from Dunmore East with an advance party of doctors and Red Cross volunteers. The Dunmore East Parish Hall had been converted into a reception centre. A full team of Red Cross volunteers had arrived from Waterford. Hot meals and medical facilities were awaiting the survivors. It was decided to land the survivors at Dunmore East, while Irish Willow continued to Waterford. Two were taken by ambulance to Waterford Infirmary with fever.

On 4 September 1942, the Munster Express published an interview with Captain Thomson "We are very pleased to land in Eire, and we certainly could not have found a better landing".

== Post war service ==
In May 1946 Irish Willow was returned to Egon Jurgenson. She was sold to Cia. de Vapores Veraguas and renamed Veraguas with a Panamanian registry. She continued to trade for a further 14 years. At the end of her 42-year career she was scrapped at Tamise, Belgium in July 1960.

== Legacy ==
Irish Willow rescued the 47 survivors from Empire Breeze. Throughout the war, Irish ships answered SOS calls and stopped to rescue, irrespective of nationality, and frequently – as in this instance – at risk to themselves. Ships in convoy were, usually, forbidden from stopping to rescue, lest they then became a target. The Empire Breeze crew were in their lifeboats when Athelprince, with the convoy commodore aboard, had to alter course to avoid collision with the abandoned Empire Breeze, but did not stop to rescue the crew. Irish ships rescued, at least, 534 seafarers during the war. (Note: There is list of rescues, with a total of 521 in Frank Forde's book. It omits, the 13 survivors from Roxby rescued by Irish Beech on 7 November 1942. There could be others.)

Before the war, Irish Shipping Ltd did not exist. Its 15 ships were not under the Irish Flag. During the war, they imported more than a million tons of essential supplies: 712,000 tons of wheat; 178,000 tons of coal; 63,000 tons of phosphate (fertilizer); 24,000 tons of tobacco; 19,000 tons of newsprint; 10,000 tons of lumber; and over 100,000 tons of more than 500 types of other goods. (This is in addition to the imports carried by other Irish ships)

On 16 May 1945, a week after VE Day Éamon de Valera addressed the nation: (Note: This speech is better known for de Valera's response to Churchill's VE-Day broadcast which condemned de Valera's policy of neutrality)

To the men of our Mercantile Marine who faced all the perils of the ocean to bring us essential supplies, the nation is profoundly grateful ...

— Taoiseach Éamon de Valera, radio speech to the nation 16 May 1945

In June 1946 a contract was signed with John Redhead and Sons, shipbuilders of South Shields to construct a new Irish Willow.

== See also ==
- Irish neutrality during World War II – international relations in World War II
- Irish Mercantile Marine during World War II
- Battle of the Atlantic

Other ships operated by Irish Shipping during World War II

- Irish Hazel
- Irish Pine
- Irish Oak

Other Irish ships operating during World War II

- Innisfallen
- Kerlogue
- Cymric
- Mary B Mitchell
- James Postlethwaite

Sister ship, USN, WW II

- USS Taganak (AG-45)

== Bibliography ==
=== Books ===
- Burne, Lester H (2003). Richard Dean Burns (ed.). Chronological History of U.S. Foreign Relations: 1932–1988. Vol. 2. Routledge. ISBN 978-0-415-93916-4.
- Cleare, Brian; Boyce, Brian; Boyce, John; Coy, Leo (2013). Irish Shipping Lt. A Fleet History. Wexford: Rosslare Maritime Enthusiasts. ISBN 978-1-78280-177-1.
- Ferriter, Diarmaid (2006). What If? Alternative Views of Twentieth-Century Ireland. Gill & Macmillan. ISBN 978-0-7171-3990-3.
- Forde, Frank (2000). The Long Watch. Dublin: New Island Books. ISBN 1-902602-42-0.
- Kennedy, Michael (2008). Guarding Neutral Ireland. Dublin: Four Courts Press. ISBN 978-1-84682-097-7.
- Kennedy, Walter (1998). Shipping in Dublin Port 1939–1945. Pentland Press. ISBN 1-85821-539-0.
- McShane, Mark (2012). Neutral Shores: Ireland and the Battle of the Atlantic. Cork: Mercier Press. ISBN 978-1-85635-934-4.
- Share, Bernard (1978). The Emergency. Dublin: Gill and Macmillan. ISBN 0-7171-0916-X.
- Spong, H.C. (1982). Irish Shipping Ltd., 1941–1982. World Ship Society. ISBN 978-0-905617-20-6.
- Sweeney, Pat (2010). Liffey Ships and Shipbuilding. Mercier. ISBN 978-1-85635-685-5.

=== Journal ===
- Higgins, John, ed. (Autumn 1980). "Irish Willow". Signal. 17 (4). Newsletter Magazine of Irish Shipping Ltd
- "Zarine v. Owners, etc. S. S. Ramava, McEvoy & Ors. v. Owners, etc. S. S. Otto, McEvoy and Veldi v. Owners, etc. S. S. Piret and S. S. Mall, Eckert & Co. v. Owners, etc. S. S. Everoja". The American Journal of International Law. 36 (3): 490–504. July 1942. doi:10.2307/2192676. JSTOR 2192676.
