= SS Otto =

A number of steamships were named Otto, including -

- SS Otto (1881), 152 GRT
- SS Otto (1893), 102 GRT
- SS Otto (1898), 896 GRT
- SS Otto (1902), 191 GRT
- SS Otto (Bonn & Mees, 1904), 202 GRT
- SS Otto (Tecklenburgh, 1904), 199 GRT
- SS Otto (1907), 1,343 GRT
- SS Otto (1918), 1,959 GRT
- SS Otto (1926), 181 GRT
- SS Otto (1928), 174 GRT
- SS Otto (1937), 217 GRT
