= MV Christinaki =

Maltese bulk carrier

History
- Name: (Republic of Ireland) MV Irish Pine (1973-1983); (Singapore) MV Siganto A.S. (1983-1988); (Singapore) MV Singa Monica (1988-1990); (Greece) MV Norman Hanne (1990-1991); (Greece) MV Hanne (1991-1992); (Malta) MV Christinaki (1992-1994)
- Owner: Demco Maritime Ltd.
- Port of registry: Valletta, Malta
- Builder: Upper Clyde Shipbuilders Ltd.
- Yard number: 126
- Launched: 29 June 1972
- Completed: 1 February 1973
- Identification: IMO number: 7221225
- Fate: Foundered 3 February 1994

General characteristics
- Type: Bulk carrier
- Tonnage: 16,704 GRT
- Length: 174.96 metres (574 ft 0 in)
- Beam: 25.6 metres (84 ft 0 in)
- Depth: 9.75 metres (32 ft 0 in)
- Installed power: 1 x 6cyl. 2SA Kincaid-B&W 6K74EF
- Propulsion: Screw propeller
- Speed: 15 knots
- Crew: 27

MV Christinaki was a Maltese bulk carrier which sank in the Atlantic Ocean 240 nautical miles (440 km) south west of Ireland during a force 10 gale with a cargo of scrap metal and 27 crew while she was travelling from Liverpool, United Kingdom to Vera Cruz.

== Construction ==
Christinaki was constructed in 1973 at the Upper Clyde Shipbuilders Ltd. shipyard in Govan, Scotland, United Kingdom. She was launched on 29 June 1972 and completed on 1 February 1973 for Irish Shipping and was named MV Irish Pine and switched owners and names several times before her demise in 1994. The ship was 174.96 metres (574 ft 0 in) long, with a beam of 25.6 metres (84 ft 0 in) and a depth of 9.75 metres (32 ft 0 in). The ship was assessed at 16,704 GRT. She had a 1 x 6cyl. 2SA Kincaid-B&W 6K74EF engine driving a single screw propeller, the engine was rated at 11.400 b.h.p.

== Sinking ==
On 2 February 1994, Christinaki left Liverpool, United Kingdom with a cargo of scrap metal bound for Vera Cruz.

The following day the weather worsened and the ship was soon caught in a force 10 storm 240 nautical miles (440 km) south west of Ireland with 35 feet (11 meters) waves ramming her deck. The ship quickly took on water as the hold hatch covers failed. The crew, knowing that the ship was taking in water and was in mortal danger quickly radioed a distress signal at 4 PM. The last radio contact was made at 4:30 PM, at this time the ship is believed to have sunk. Rescuers searched the following day for any survivors near the last known location of the ship but it was soon clear that the 27 Greek and Filipino crew members had perished.
