= SS Empire Breeze =

World War II merchant ship of the United Kingdom

Coordinates: 49°22′N 35°52′W

History
- Name: Empire Breeze
- Owner: Ministry of War Transport
- Operator: J & J Denholm Ltd
- Port of registry: (United Kingdom) Sunderland
- Builder: J L Thompson & Sons Ltd, Sunderland
- Yard number: 603
- Launched: 3 October 1940
- Completed: January 1941
- Out of service: 25 August 1942
- Identification: UK Official Number 168662; Code Letters GPFP (1941-42)
- Fate: Torpedoed 25 August 1942 and sank 27 August

General characteristics
- Tonnage: 7,457 GRT; 4,557 NRT
- Length: 310 ft 6 in (94.64 m)
- Beam: 59 ft 9 in (18.21 m)
- Depth: 35 ft (10.67 m)
- Propulsion: Triple expansion steam engine
- Crew: 42, plus 6 DEMS gunners
- Armament: 1 × 4-inch gun; 1 × 20 mm anti-aircraft gun; 2 × twin machine guns

Location of the sinking of Empire Breeze.

Empire Breeze was a 7,457 GRT cargo ship which was built in 1940 for the Ministry of War Transport (MoWT). Shortly after entering service she ran aground but was repaired. Empire Breeze was torpedoed and sunk by U-176 on 25 August 1942.

== Description ==
Empire Breeze was built by J L Thompson & Sons Ltd, Sunderland. She was yard number 603. Launched on 3 October 1940, she was completed in January 1941.

Empire Breeze was 310 feet 6 inches (94.64 m) long, with a beam of 59 feet 9 inches (18.21 m) and a depth of 35 feet (10.67 m). She was propelled by a triple expansion steam engine which had cylinders of 25 inches (64 cm), 41 inches (100 cm) and 68 inches (170 cm) bore by 45 inches (110 cm) stroke. The engine was built by George Clarke (1938) Ltd, Sunderland. Empire Breeze was armed with a 4" gun, a 20mm AA gun and two twin machine guns.

== Career ==
Empire Breeze's port of registry was Sunderland. She was operated under the management of J & J Denholm Ltd, Sunderland. On 5 February 1941, she ran aground on the Bondicar Rocks, off Amble, Northumberland. She was refloated on 13 March and taken in tow by the tug Bullger, but the tug struck a mine and sank in Druridge Bay. Empire Breeze was anchored off Cresswell and later taken to Sunderland for repairs. She was a member of a number of convoys during the Second World War.

=== ON 37 ===
Convoy ON 37 departed from Liverpool on 15 November 1941 and dispersed at sea on 24 November.

=== ON 122 ===
Convoy ON 122 departed from Liverpool on 15 August 1942 and dispersed at sea on 3 September. On 25 August 1942, Empire Breeze was torpedoed by U-176 and U-438. Two torpedoes struck Empire Breeze, killing one crew member. She began to settle by the stern. The captain of U-438 claimed the kill, but postwar analysis shows that it was U-176 which had fired the fatal shot. The tug HMS Frisky was sent from St. John's, Newfoundland and Labrador and Flower-class corvette HMCS Rosthern was detached from the convoy to assist in salvaging Empire Breeze. The surviving crew abandoned ship, but later reboarded her and sent distress signals after repairing the radio set. On 27 August, the Irish merchant ship Irish Willow rescued the 42 surviving crew and six DEMS gunners. They were landed at Dunmore East, County Waterford on 1 September. Although Empire Breeze was still afloat on 27 August, she could not be found by HMS Frisky and the search was abandoned on 30 August. Those lost on Empire Breeze are commemorated at the Tower Hill Memorial, London.

== Official Numbers and Code Letters ==
Official Numbers were a forerunner to IMO Numbers. Empire Breeze had the UK Official Number 168662 and used the Code Letters GPFP.
