= Innisfallen (ship) =

Several ships have been named Innisfallen, the name being derived from the island of Innisfallen on Lough Leane in County Kerry and often given to vessels serving the southerly coasts of Ireland. Five served on the Irish Sea route between Cork and Fishguard, from 1896 onwards: two of these were war casualties whilst the remainder have been either scrapped or renamed and sold to new owners.

== Innisfallen (1863–1897) ==
A ship named Innisfallen was built at Blyth, Northumberland, England, in about 1863. She sank with the loss of eight lives in the English Channel in the vicinity of the Goodwin Sands in a storm at the end of November 1897, on a voyage from South Shields to Cowes. She was carrying a cargo of coal gas when she sank.

== Innisfallen (1896–1918) ==
The Innisfallen built in 1896 was torpedoed and sunk, without warning, by German U-boat UB-64 on 23 May 1918, 16 nautical miles (30 km) east of the Kish Light Vessel. She was on her way from Liverpool to Cork. 10 died. She had been owned by City of Cork Steam Packet Company.

== Innisfallen (1930–1940) ==
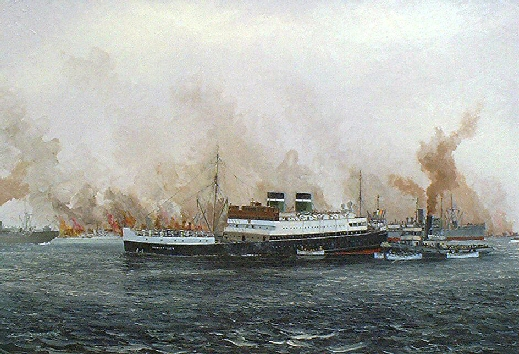
Innisfallen sunk by a mine in the River Mersey, 21 December 1940, shown here as passengers escape on lifeboats. (Oil by Kenneth King, Maritime Institute of Ireland).

The City of Cork Steam Packet Company built the second Innisfallen in 1930. City of Cork Steam Packet Company, was taken over by the Coast Lines group. They set up their Cork – Fishguard operation as “B & I Lines” (British and Irish Lines). She sailed the Dublin – Liverpool route.

Leaving Liverpool on 21 December 1940, she hit a mine off the Wirral shore near New Brighton, and sank. All the passengers survived, but four crewmen were lost.

== Innisfallen (1948–1985) ==
A new Innisfallen was launched in 1948 by B&I. The B&I had an advertising slogan: "Travel the Innisfallen Way". She was sold in 1967, to Hellenic Maritime Lines and renamed Poseidonia. She was broken up at Brindisi in 1985. In 1967 the Irish Government bought B&I Lines from the Coast Lines group.

== Innisfallen (1969–2004) ==
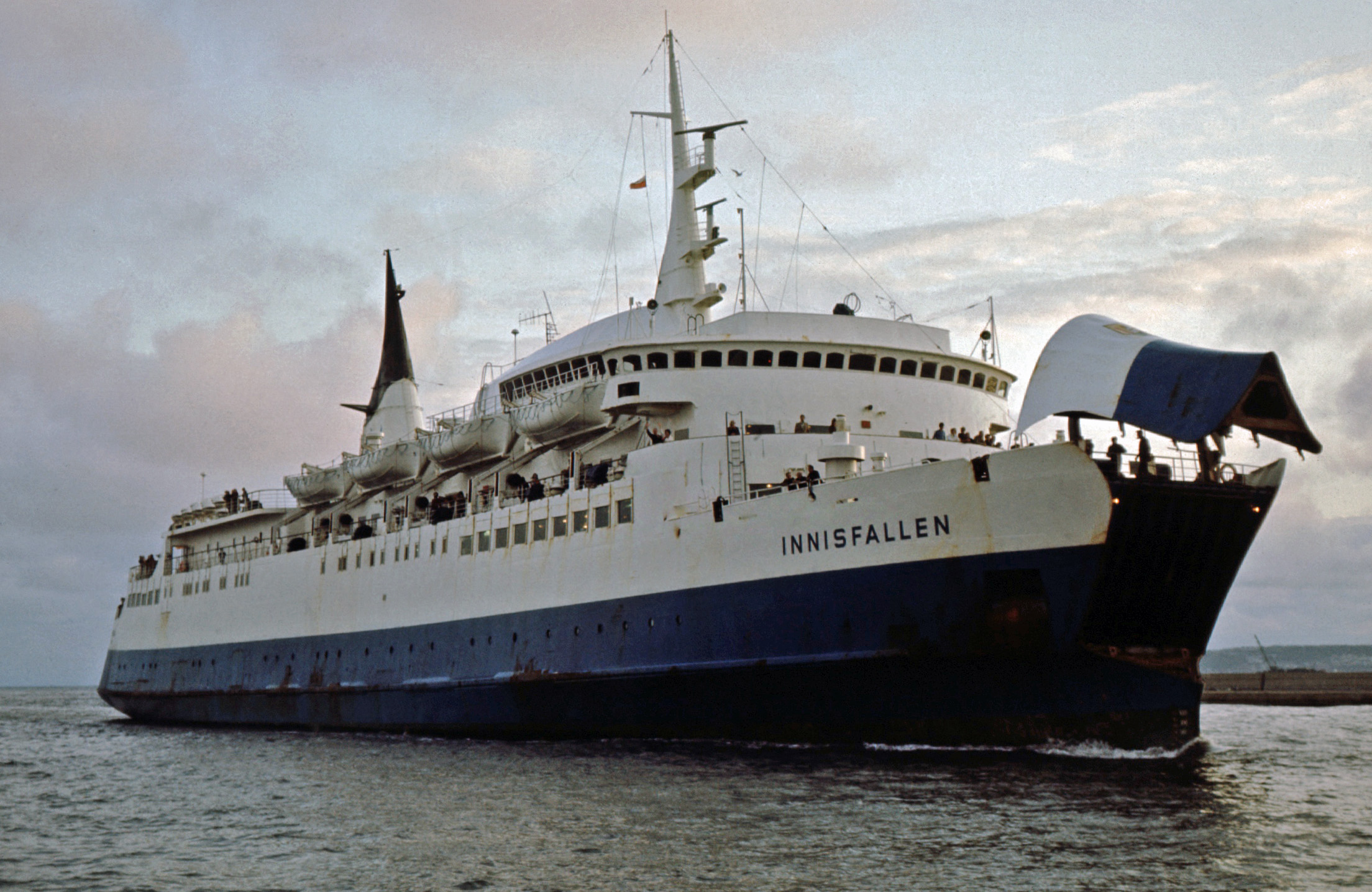
Innisfallen (1969–2004) arriving 1975 at Swansea

A further Innisfallen was launched in 1969. She sailed the Cork-Swansea route, while her sister ship, Leinster, sailed Dublin-Liverpool. In 1983 all sailings from Cork were closed, as there were not enough passengers.

Innisfallen was sold to Corsica Ferries who renamed her Corsica Viva. There were several more changes to her name. In 2003 she was sold to Sancak Lines, Turkey, who renamed her Derin Deniz. She was broken up in 2004.

== Innisfallen (1968; ex-Leinster) ==
The B&I Line then renamed Leinster, which was launched in 1968, as Innisfallen in 1980. This 'Innisfallen', being a deeper draught than the previous ship, now sailed Cork-Pembroke Dock. In 1986 she was sold to Strintzis Lines and was renamed Ionian Sun. In 2000 Strintzis Lines renamed themselves as Blue Ferries. In 2001 she was sold to Marco Shipping Agency, Dubai, and renamed Merdif. She was out of service by 2004.
