= Kenneth King (artist) =

Irish artist (1939–2019)

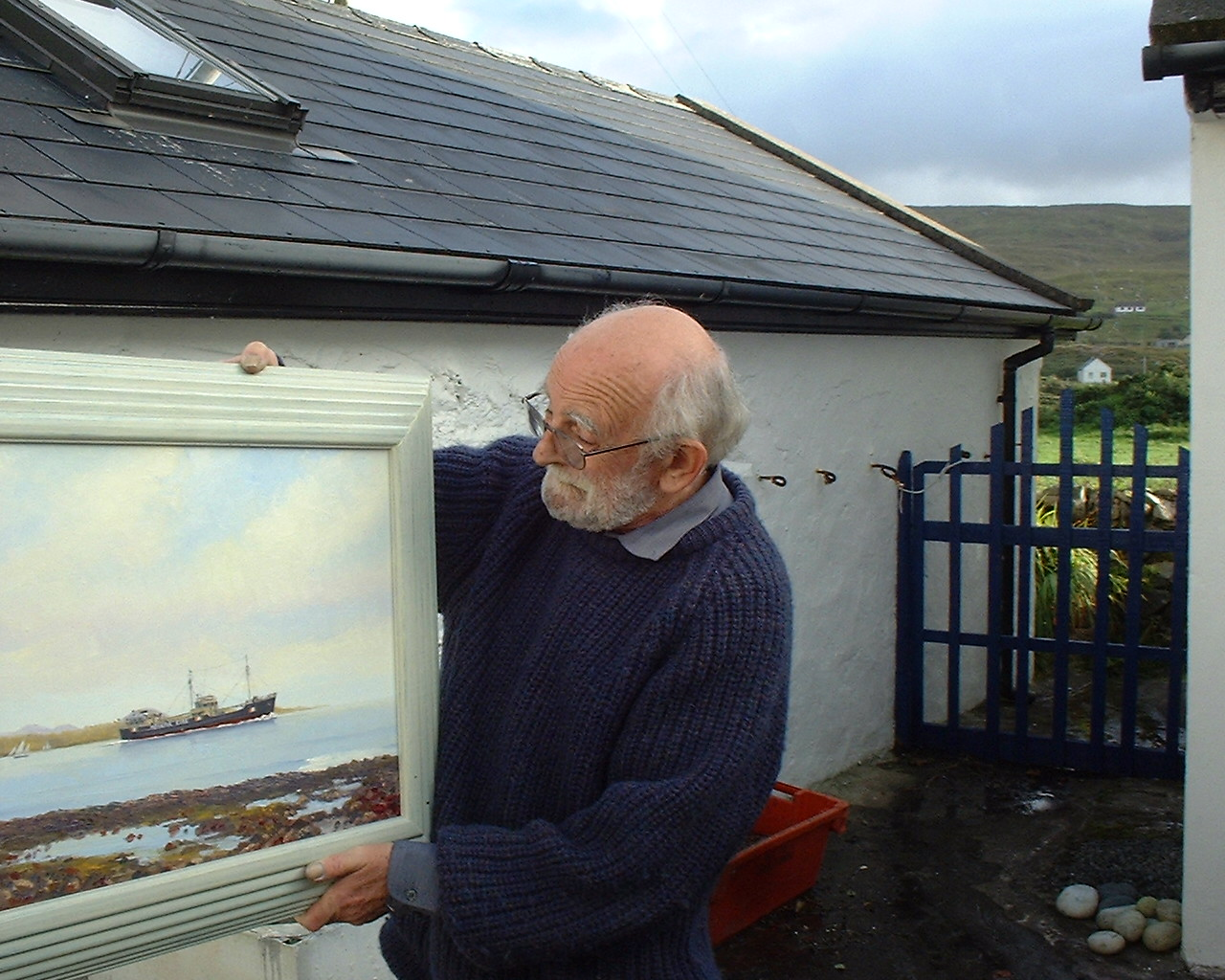
Kenneth King, 2009, outside Straid Studio-Gallery

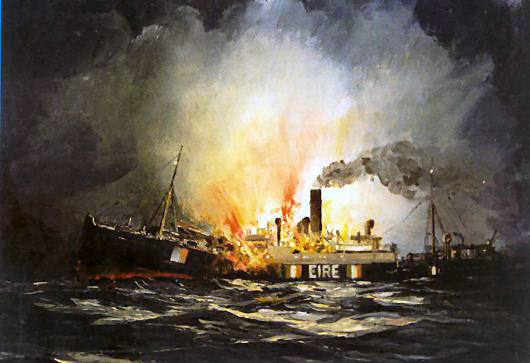
Ardmore (National Maritime Museum of Ireland)

Kenneth King (1939 – 17 August 2019) was an Irish marine artist, who was a Chaplain in the Royal Navy before he became a full-time artist. King's studio, Straid Studio-Gallery, was in Glencolmcille in County Donegal, Ireland.

== Work ==
King was born in Dublin; his father was artist Richard King, who designed Irish postage stamps and worked in stained glass.

King specialised in depicting the naval and merchant shipping of Ireland, as well as seascapes of the country's coastline and lighthouses. He has been commissioned by the Royal National Lifeboat Institution, Irish Shipping, An Post, Bord Iascaigh Mhara, the Maritime Institute of Ireland and the Office of Public Works.

The National Maritime Museum of Ireland has paintings by King, of all but one the Irish ships lost during World War II. Irish Shipping had commissioned King to paint pictures of all their ships. When Irish Shipping was liquidated, the receiver sold the collection at auction. The Maritime Institute of Ireland acquired some of the paintings; they concentrated on ships lost during World War II. Later, at the instigation of Des Brannigan, then President of the Institution, the Institute commissioned King to paint pictures of the other Irish ships lost during the war. This collection is on display in the National Maritime Museum of Ireland. The collection lacks one image: the Naomh Garbhan which hit a mine off the Waterford coast and sank with the loss of three lives on 2 May 1945. King died in Letterkenny, County Donegal on 17 August 2019.

== Bibliography ==
Kenneth King, Life and Works by Marianne O'Kane Boal
