= SS Irish Pine (1919) =

Cargo steamship sunk in 1942

History
- Name: West Hematite (1919-41); Irish Pine (1941-42)
- Owner: United States Maritime Commission (1919- ); United States Shipping Board (1933-43)
- Operator: Cosmo Shipping Co (1919-21); United States Maritime Commission (1921- ); United States Shipping Board (1933--41); Irish Shipping Ltd (1941-42)
- Port of registry: (United States) Seattle (1919-41); (Republic of Ireland) Dublin (1941-42)
- Route: Bordeaux - Rotterdam - Le Havre - New York (1919-21)
- Builder: J F Duthie, Seattle, Washington
- Yard number: 23
- Launched: 26 April 1919
- Completed: June 1919
- Out of service: 16 November 1942
- Identification: United States Official number 218111 (1919–41); United Kingdom Official number 159843 (1941–42); Code Letters LRGF (1930–33); Code Letters KLCS (1934–41); Code Letters EINQ (1941–42)
- Fate: Torpedoed and sunk, 16 November 1942

General characteristics
- Tonnage: 5,621 GRT; 3,491 DWT
- Length: 409 ft 7 in (124.84 m) (West Hematite, 1930); 410 ft 4 in (125.07 m) (Irish Pine, 1941)
- Beam: 54 ft 2 in (16.51 m) (West Hematite, 1930); 54 ft (16.46 m) (Irish Pine, 1941)
- Depth: 27 ft 7 in (8.41 m) (West Hematite, 1930); 30 ft 2 in (9.19 m) (Irish Pine, 1941)
- Installed power: 1 x triple expansion steam engine
- Propulsion: Single screw
- Speed: 10.5 knots (19.4 km/h)
- Crew: 33
- Notes: Built to Design 1013

Irish Pine was a 5,621 GRT cargo ship which was built in 1919 for the United States Maritime Commission (USMC) and named West Hematite. She was chartered in 1941 by Irish Shipping Ltd and renamed Irish Pine. On 16 November 1942, Irish Pine was torpedoed and sunk by the German submarine U-608.

== Description ==
The ship was built to Design 1013 by J. F. Duthie & Company, Seattle, Washington, was launched on 26 April 1919 and completed in June of that year. The ship was 409 feet 7 inches (124.84 m) long, with a beam of 54 feet 2 inches (16.51 m) and a depth of 27 feet 2 inches (8.28 m). She was propelled by a triple expansion steam engine which had cylinders of 24.5 inches (62 cm), 41.5 inches (105 cm) and 72 inches (180 cm) bore and 48 inches (120 cm) stroke. It was built by the Llewellyn Iron Works, Los Angeles. She could make 10.5 knots (19.4 km/h).

Irish Pine was recorded in Lloyd's Register as being 410 feet 4 inches (125.07 m) long, with a beam of 54 feet (16.46 m) and a depth of 30 feet 2 inches (9.19 m).

== History ==
West Hematite was built for the USMC. She was initially chartered to Cosmo Shipping Co and was used on the Bordeaux – Rotterdam – Le Havre – New York route. On 16 February 1923, she ran aground in the Weser. The American cargo ship Schroon went to her assistance and also ran aground. By 1933, she had passed to the United States Shipping Board (USSB). She was later withdrawn from service and placed in the reserve fleet.

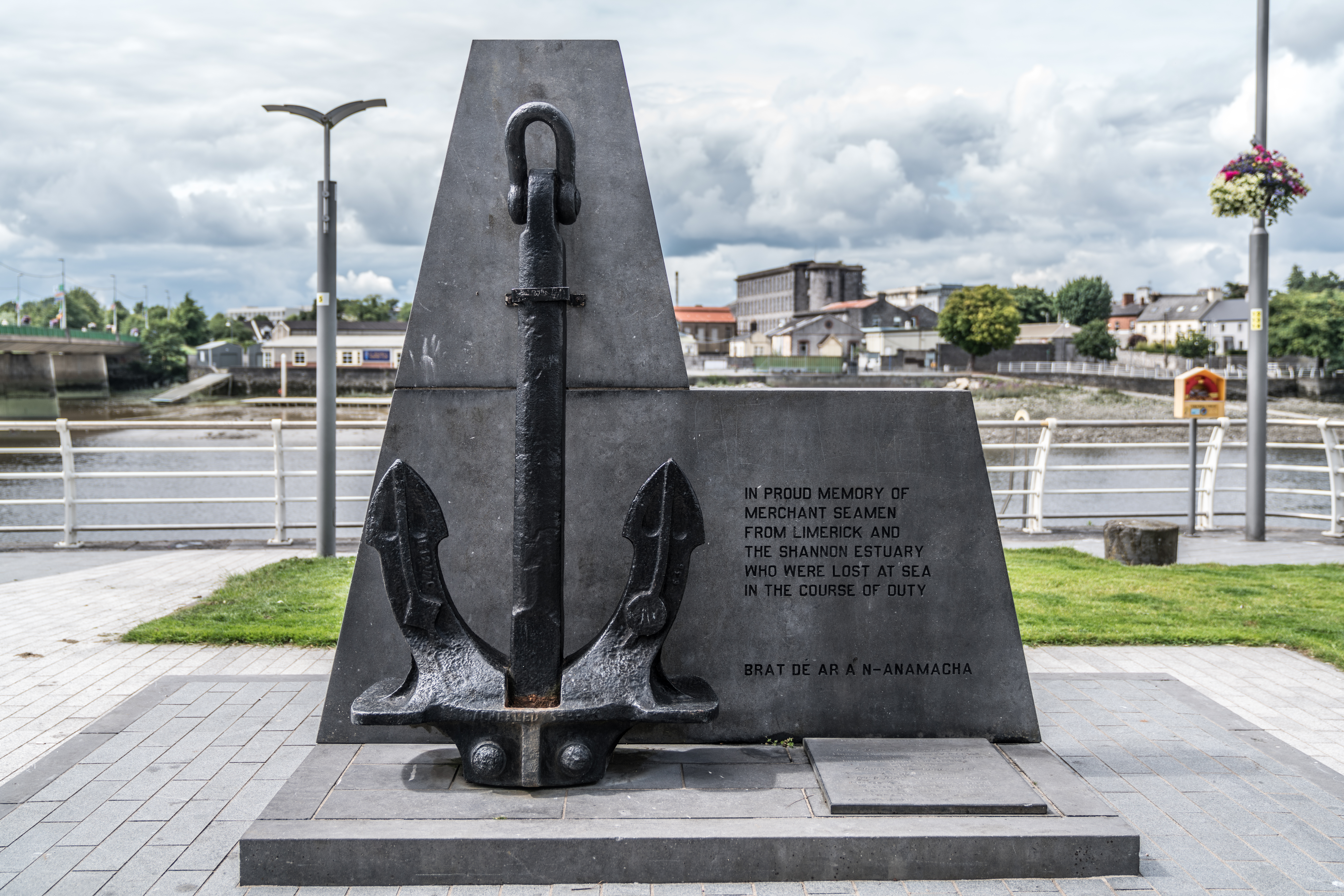
Memorial dedicated to men who lost their lives on SS Irish Pine

On 26 September 1941, West Hematite was chartered from the USSB by Irish Shipping Ltd and renamed Irish Pine. Irish Oak was also chartered from the USSB. On 4 August 1942, the Union-Castle Line's Richmond Castle was torpedoed and sunk by U-176 off Cape Farewell. Irish Pine rescued 15 of the 50 survivors and landed them at Kilrush.

At 00:15 on 16 November 1942, Irish Pine was hit by a single torpedo from U-608. Although the 33 crew started to take to the lifeboats, the ship sank at 00:17, costing everyone on board their life. Her position was 42°45′N 58°00′W, in the North Atlantic south of Cape Breton Island, Canada. Ireland had not declared war on Germany, and therefore Irish Pine was a neutral vessel.

== Official number and code letters ==
Official Numbers were a forerunner to IMO Numbers. West Hematite had the United States Official Number 218111. Irish Pine had the United Kingdom Official Number 159843.

West Hematite used the Code Letters LRGF from 1930 and KLCS from 1934. Irish Pine used the Code Letters EINQ.
