= Irish Shipping =

Irish state-owned shipping company

Irish Shipping Ltd
- House flag (1947–1984)
- Industry: Passenger transportation Freight transportation Marine insurance
- Founded: 21 March 1941
- Defunct: 14 November 1984
- Fate: Liquidation
- Headquarters: Dublin, Ireland
- Area served: Global trade
- Owner: Irish Government
- Divisions: Irish Continental Line; Belfast Car Ferries

Irish Shipping Limited was an Irish state-owned deep sea shipping company, formed during World War II for the purpose of supplying the country's import needs. Its ships were usually named after trees. Its contribution to Irish neutrality was recognised by the government after the war. In the post-war years the company continued to operate as a commercial strategic reserve until 1984 when, as a result of taking on a series of expensive long-term time charters, it was forced into liquidation.

== Background ==
Ireland had declared its neutrality when hostilities broke out and in the early years of the war much of its food needs were carried on board Allied ships. The Irish government realised that they needed to be more independent and self-sufficient. In February 1941, Seán Lemass, the Minister for Supplies stated that "The creation of an Irish mercantile marine was necessary, as it was as important for the national safety as the Army".

Original house flag of Irish Shipping, used from 1941–1947

On 21 March 1941, Irish Shipping Limited was formed as a company majority owned by the state, which held 51% of the shares. 43 3/4% were owned by Grain Importers Ireland Ltd and the three largest shipping companies in the state, Wexford Steamship Company, Limerick Steamship Company and Palgrave Murphy Limited, held 1 3/4% each. Each of the shareholders also had a representative on the board. Unfortunately the new company had a major problem in that it had no ships and needed to acquire some. Lemass's ministerial secretary John Leydon became the first chairman of Irish Shipping.

== The wartime fleet ==
Ships of all forms and in all conditions were a very scarce resource during the early years of the war. The company management took control of whatever tonnage, in whatever condition, they could lay their hands on. Its first ship was the Irish Poplar which was located in Avilés, Spain, as the Greek-flagged Vassilios Destounis. It had been abandoned following an attack by a German aircraft in the Bay of Biscay and towed into port by Spanish fishermen, where it was purchased by Irish Shipping.

=== List of ships operated during World War Two ===
==== Acquired in 1941 ====
- Irish Poplar (March 1941 – 1949) Ex Vassilios Destounis
- Irish Larch (28 July 1941 – November 1949) Ex Haifa Trader
- Irish Beech (13 May 1941 – 1948) Ex Cetvrti
- Irish Elm (August 1941 – 1949) Ex Leda
- Irish Fir (14 October 1941 – 1949) Ex Margara
- Irish Hazel (17 June 1941 – 1943, 1945 – 1949) Ex Noemijulia
- Irish Oak (21 May 1941 – 15 May 1943) Ex West Neris
- Irish Pine (21 May 1941 – 16 November 1942) Ex West Hematite
- Irish Plane (26 December 1941 – 1 February 1947) Ex Arena
- Irish Willow (December 1941 – 1946) Ex Otto

==== Acquired in 1942 ====
- Irish Rose 1942 to 1946
- Irish Alder 1942 to 1946
- Irish Spruce 1942 to 1949
- Irish Ash 1942 to 1949

==== Acquired in 1943 ====
- Irish Cedar

=== Other ventures ===
The nature of the conflict and of the state meant that Irish Shipping had some unusual influences on its commercial operations. This led it into a number of other commercial ventures, most notably marine insurance and ship repair, where it might not necessarily have wanted to be.

A combination of the war, and that Irish ships were sailing out of convoy, led to impossibly high premiums for goods carried in Irish ships. This encouraged the company to set up its own successful marine insurance business which it sold to the Insurance Corporation of Ireland after the war.

== The post-war years ==
As most of the original ships were in poor condition, in 1946 the company ordered eight new ones from British yards.

=== Ships acquired in 1948 ===
- Irish Rose new build (1948–1954)
- Irish Willow new build (1948–1954)
- Irish Pine new build (1948–1965)

Irish Pine was the first of six ISL steamships whose triple-expansion engine was augmented with an exhaust steam turbine, which increased both power and fuel-efficiency.

=== Ships acquired in 1949 ===
- Irish Oak new build (1949–1967)

Irish Oak was a sister ship of Irish Pine. Both were built by John Readhead & Sons in South Shields. Readhead re-engined Irish Oak in 1959 and Irish Pine in 1960; replacing their steam reciprocating engines and turbines with Doxford diesel engines.

- Irish Cedar new build (1949–1959)
- Irish Plane new build (1949–1960)

Irish Cedar and Irish Plane were sister ships.

=== Ships acquired in the 1950s ===
- Irish Hazel new build (1950–1960)

Irish Hazel was a sister of Irish Cedar and Irish Plane.

- Irish Elm new build (1953–1963)

Irish Elm was a sister of Irish Oak and Irish Plane.

Two sister ships were delivered in 1952 and 1954:

- Irish Heather 1952 to 1964
- Irish Fern 1954 to 1964

They were used on several routes and carried many varied cargoes.

Three sister ships were delivered in 1956,

- Irish Willow 1956 to 1969
- Irish Rose 1956 to 1969
- Irish Fir 1956 to 1969

These were smaller ships, with accommodation aft and twin holds. Originally designed primarily for Baltic trading they were utilized on the North Atlantic and even saw service in South America and the far north of Canada in Hudson Bay.

The following dry cargo ships built for Irish Shipping during the mid-1950s and were powered by Doxford opposed-piston engines.

- Irish Alder 1956 to 1968
- Irish Ash 1958 to 1970
- Irish Larch 1956 to 1968
- Irish Maple 1957 to 1968

Two steam turbine ships were owned and operated:

- Irish Spruce, 1957–1972
- Irish Poplar, 1956–1972

Due to the sharp increase in the price of oil and the greater thermal efficiencies of diesel engines, these were the last two steam powered ships to be operated by Irish Shipping. Both ships were equipped with refrigerated cargo tweendecks for the carriage of frozen meat. They both survived to the early 1972, when the Irish Poplar was sold off, and the Irish Spruce ran aground in the Caribbean and was subsequently broken up for scrap.

==== The tankers ====
The Irish Holly 1954–1967, Irish Hawthorn 1958–1965, and Irish Blackthorn 1959–1965 were the only tankers ever operated by ISL. The Irish Hawthorn and Irish Blackthorn were steam turbine ships and were sold in 1965. The Irish Holly was primarily a coastal oil tanker, triple expansion steam engine. This ship survived in the fleet for some time after the two larger ships.

=== Ships acquired in the 1960s ===
Two sisters delivered in the early 1960s. Laid down in the very late 1950s.

- MV Irish Rowan: First ship built in the newly formed Verolme Cork Dockyard. 1961. Powered by Doxford diesel engine.
- MV Irish Sycamore: A sister of the Rowan with similar machinery, built in England.

Two other sister ships were operated:

- Irish Plane 1963–1976 10,448.5 gross register tons (GRT) 6,044.7 NT IHP 8,450 ON 400358 (c. 1963)
- Irish Cedar 1962–1976 10,477 GRT 6,052.98 NRT BHP 7,250 ON 400269 (c. 1963)

The Irish Cedar operated the Cork-Casablanca-Dublin run importing phosphate for Gouldings Ireland before the Irish Plane was used on the run. When the Irish Cedar was sold in the 1970s she was converted to an oil exploration vessel; a drill ship. The Irish Plane operated on the Casablanca – Dublin – Cork run, importing phosphate fertiliser for several years. Both of these sisters were powered by MAN diesel engines, type KZ70-120D

=== Ships acquired in the 1970s ===
==== The Star ships and the Elm ====
Irish Shipping entered a joint venture with the Norwegian Star Shipping company and operated two ships;

- Irish Star 1970-1978
- Irish Stardust 1970–1976

A bulk carrier with retractable/stackable car decks was also acquired;

- Irish Elm 1968–1979 22,186.03 GRT 14,516.91 NRT ON 400577 BHP 18,800. ON 400577

The Irish Elm was the second ship built for Irish Shipping at Verolme Cork Dockyard and made her maiden voyage in 1969. She was a new departure for the company, being operated by a GPR (general purpose) crew. Each crew member had a cabin and the ship had an officers and a crew bar. It also had a swimming pool. The accommodation, all aft was air conditioned. The main engine, a MAN, could be manoeuvred from the bridge.

She was designed to run with an unmanned machinery space, UMS, for night time sailing in open waters, however this was seldom, if ever achieved. There were many design problems with the UMS equipment, the main problem being that the electronics were germanium based rather than silicon. Silicon had not come to the fore as the most suitable semiconductor material. The germanium was affected by the high ambient temperatures in the engine room.

The ships was primarily designed as a bulk carrier, but had electro-hydraulic cranes and pontoon decks fitted after her sea trials. She operated for many years as a car carrier primarily transporting cars from Japan to the US and Europe. Elm was sold in 1979.

A further mis-match of technology was the use of steam driven reciprocating feed pump for the exhaust gas boiler. Controlled by a pneumatic valve, the system required constant attention to ensure correct operation.

==== Celtic Bulk Carriers ====
In the early 1970s ISL set up a joint venture with Reardon Smiths called Celtic Bulk Carriers and between them ordered 12 standard ships from Govan Shipbuilders in Glasgow. The ships were referred to as Clyde-class and the Irish ships were named:

- MV Irish Pine 1973–1983
- Irish Larch 1973–
- Irish Oak 1973– 16,703.84 GRT Reg T 11360.88 ON 401220
- Irish Maple 1973– 16,703.84 GRT, 11,360.88 NRT ON 401218 BHP 11600

==== The Japanese ships ====
The Irish Cedar and Irish Rowan were built in Japan and delivered in 1976.

=== The Spruce ===
The company took delivery of their final ships, the Irish Spruce in 1983. Built in Verolme Cork Dockyard, it was a Panamax bulk carrier of 72,000 tonnes deadweight (DWT). Its ordering and build were the subject of much controversy with many feeling that the Irish government put undue pressure on the company to place the order to keep the dockyard open.

== Managed ships ==
=== The Rock Boats ===
- Daunt Rock
- Skellig Rock
- Tuskar Rock
- Fastnet Rock

=== Other managed ships ===
- Lough Beltra
- Asgard II

== Liquidation and aftermath ==
On 14 November 1984, the Irish government surprised most observers by placing Irish Shipping Ltd into liquidation. Maurice Tempany, a senior partner at Ernst & Young was appointed as official liquidator. He quickly set about laying-off the staff and making preparations for the sale of the ships. With four ships still owned by the company – Irish Maple, Irish Rowan, Irish Cedar and Irish Spruce – as each came into port it was arrested and eventually sold.

== See also ==
- Irish neutrality (external issues)
- The Emergency (internal issues)
- Irish Mercantile Marine during World War II
- Maritime Institute of Ireland

== References and sources ==
=== Legislation relating to Irish Shipping Ltd ===
- Acts of the Oireachtas – The Parliament of Ireland
- No. 10/1994: Irish Shipping Limited (Payments to Former Employees) Act, 1994
- No. 8/1984: Irish Shipping Limited (Amendment) Act, 1984
- No. 8/1982: Irish Shipping Limited Act, 1982
- No. 39/1980: Irish Shipping Limited (Amendment) Act, 1980
- No. 3/1959: Irish Shipping Limited (Amendment) Act, 1959
- No. 37/1947: Irish Shipping Limited Act, 1947

=== Sources ===
- Spong, H C (1982). Irish Shipping Ltd. Kendal: World Ship Society. ISBN 0-905617-20-7.
- Forde, Frank (2000) [1981]. The Long Watch. Dublin: New Island Books. ISBN 1-902602-42-0.
- Irish Shipping Ltd. Signal. Company In-House Publication.
