= Ireland (surname) =

Ireland is a surname. Notable people with the surname include:

- Alexander Ireland (disambiguation), several persons
- Alleyne Ireland (1871–1951), British traveller and author
- Andrew Ireland (disambiguation), several persons
- Ann Ireland (1953–2018), Canadian fiction author
- Anne Ireland (1842–1893), English writer and biographer
- Anne Ireland (volleyball) (born 1946), Canadian volleyball player
- Anthony Ireland (disambiguation), several persons
- Bernard Ireland (died 2019), British naval engineer and writer
- Betty Ireland (born 1946), American politician
- Betty de Courcy Ireland (1911–1999), Irish socialist and anti-war activist
- Brian Ireland (born 1980), American drummer
- Brian de Courcy-Ireland (1900–2001), British naval officer
- Celia Ireland (born 1966), Australian actress
- Charles Thomas Ireland Jr. (1921–1972), American businessman
- Chris Ireland (born 1951), American pharmacist and professor
- Christopher Ireland, American brigadier general
- Clifford C. Ireland (1878–1930), American politician
- Colin Ireland (1954–2012), British serial killer
- Courtney Ireland, New Zealand athlete
- Craig Ireland (born 1975), Scottish footballer
- Dan Ireland (1949–2016), American-Canadian film producer and director
- Daniel Anthony Ireland (born 1990), Australian football player
- Darwin Ireland (born 1971), American football player
- David Ireland (disambiguation), several persons
- De Courcy Ireland (1873–1915), Irish cricketer and British Indian Army officer
- Denis Ireland (1894–1974), Irish essayist and political activist
- Dennis Ireland (born 1954), New Zealand motorcycle racer
- Doug Ireland (1946–2013), American journalist
- Eleanor Ireland (1926–2020), British computer scientist
- Faith Ireland (born 1942), American judge
- Gail L. Ireland (1895–1988), American attorney and politician
- Gary Ireland (born 1961), Australian cricketer
- George Ireland (disambiguation), several persons
- Gilbert Ireland (1624–1675), English politician
- Greg Ireland (born 1965), Canadian ice hockey coach
- Hannah Ireland (born 1995), New Zealand artist
- Innes Ireland (1930–1993), Scottish race car driver
- Jake Ireland (born 1946), Canadian football referee
- James Ireland (1846–1886), Scottish architect
- James Ireland (musician), Australian drummer
- Janna Ireland (born 1985), African-American photographer
- Jeff Ireland (born 1970), American football administrator
- Jerry Ireland (1938–2020), English footballer
- Jill Ireland (1936–1990), English actress
- Jimmie Ireland (1903–1998), Scottish rugby union player
- John Ireland (1914–1992), Canadian-American actor and film director
- John Ireland (disambiguation), several persons
- Jon Ireland (born 1967), Australian tennis player
- Jordie Ireland (born 1997), Australian musician and producer
- Justina Ireland (born 1985), American author
- Karin Ireland, American author
- Kathy Ireland (born 1963), American model, actress, author, and entrepreneur
- Kenny Ireland (1944–2014), Scottish director and actor
- Kevin Ireland (1933–2023), New Zealand poet
- Kylie Ireland (born 1970), American pornographic actress and radio show host
- Kym Ireland (1955–2025), Australian field hockey player
- Laila Ireland, American activist and military non-commissioned officer
- Logan Ireland, American military non-commissioned officer
- Lynwood Ireland (born 1942), American politician
- Mardy S. Ireland, American author and psychoanalyst
- Margaret Ann Ireland (1928–2018), Canadian pianist and radio producer and broadcaster
- Marin Ireland (born 1979), American actress
- Mark Ireland (disambiguation), several persons
- Mary E. Ireland (1834–1927), American author and translator
- Merritte W. Ireland (1867–1952), Surgeon General of the United States Army
- Mike Ireland (born 1974), Canadian speed skater
- Patricia Ireland (born 1945), American feminist and administrator
- Paul Ireland (born 1970), Scottish actor
- R. Duane Ireland, American professor and author
- Richard Ireland (disambiguation), several persons
- Robert Ireland (disambiguation), several persons
- Roderick L. Ireland (born 1944), American judge
- Samuel Ireland (1744–1800), British author
- Sean Ireland (born 1969), Canadian speed skater
- Sidney Ireland (1886–1964), English footballer
- Simon Ireland (born 1971), English footballer
- Stephen Ireland (born 1986), Irish footballer
- Thomas James Ireland (1792–1863), British politician
- Timothy Ireland (disambiguation), multiple people
  - Tim Ireland (born 1953), American baseball player
  - Tim Ireland (born 1958), American politician from Florida
- Walter Ireland (tennis) (1882–1932), Irish tennis player
- Walter Ireland (1923–2010), American politician
- William Ireland (disambiguation), several persons
