= Cheap Wine =

Cheap Wine most commonly refers to:

- Cheap Wine (band), an Italian rock band
- "Cheap Wine" (song), a 1980 song by Australian pub rock band Cold Chisel

Cheap Wine may also refer to:

== Music ==
=== Albums ===
- Cheap Wine, a compilation album by American musician Charlie Parr, 2011
- Cheap Wine, an EP by Niko Moon, 2010

=== Songs ===
- "Cheap Wine", by A Will Away from Bliss, 2015
- "Cheap Wine", by Brant Bjork from Brant Bjork & the Operators, 2002
- "Cheap Wine", by Brymo from Merchants, Dealers & Slaves, 2013
- "Cheap Wine", by Darkbuster from 22 Songs You'll Never Want to Hear Again!, 1999
- "Cheap Wine", by Fat Freddy's Drop from Blackbird, 2013
- "Cheap Wine", by Green on Red from Gravity Talks, 1983
- "Cheap Wine", by The Vamps from Night & Day, 2017
- "Cheap Wine", by What Made Milwaukee Famous from What Doesn't Kill Us, 2008

== Other uses ==
- Cheap Wine, an exhibition by New Zealand artist Hannah Ireland, 2024
