= Shane Clements =

Australian cricketer

Personal information
- Full name: Shane Clifton Clements
- Born: 28 June 1958; Middle Swan, Western Australia
- Died: 22 April 2001 (aged 42); Inglewood, Western Australia
- Batting: Right-handed
- Bowling: Right-arm medium
- Role: Batsman

Domestic team information
- Years: Team
- 1981/82–1984/85: Western Australia

Career statistics
Competition	First-class	List A
Matches	20	8
Runs scored	1,114	123
Batting average	34.81	17.57
100s/50s	1/8	0/0
Top score	151	35
Balls bowled	98	60
Wickets	0	1
Bowling average	–	61.00
5 wickets in innings	–	0
10 wickets in match	–	0
Best bowling	–	1/61
Catches/stumpings	15/–	2/–
- Source: CricketArchive, 21 December 2012

Shane Clifton Clements (28 June 1958 – 22 April 2001) was an Australian cricketer who played several seasons for Western Australia during the early 1980s.

From Perth, Clements played several matches at colts level in 1975, but did not make his senior debut until late in the 1981–82 season, when he played one match each in the Sheffield Shield and McDonald's Cup competitions. In his inaugural first-class match, a Sheffield Shield game against Queensland, he scored two half-centuries (73 and 86), and featured in opening partnerships of 127 and 171 with Geoff Marsh. Clements was a somewhat-regular selection at state level for the following three seasons. Alternating between the middle order and the opening positions, he played four matches during the 1982–83 Sheffield Shield season, averaging 26.33 with a highest score of 45.

The 1983–84 season was Clements' most successful, with his seven matches producing 480 runs at an average of 40.00, including one century and three half-centuries. The century, his only at first-class level, was an innings of 151 runs against Tasmania at the NTCA Ground in February 1984, which The Sydney Morning Herald said was "business-like" in comparison to "the flamboyant attitude" he had effected previously. Clements' 1984–85 season was less fruitful, with selectors preferring to trial Rob Gartrell, Peter Gonnella, and Gary Ireland in the middle order at various points during the season. His contributions at List A level remained limited, and he was not selected for Western Australia after that season. Clements committed suicide in April 2001, dying at the age of 42.
