= North Irish (disambiguation) =

North Irish most commonly refers to People of Northern Ireland.

North Irish can also refer to:

- 152 (North Irish) Regiment RLC, a reserve British Army regiment
- 204 (North Irish) Field Hospital, a unit of the Royal Army Medical Corps
- 210 (North Irish) Multi-Role Medical Regiment, a unit of the Royal Army Medical Corps
- 253 (North Irish) Medical Regiment, a regiment of the Royal Army Medical Coprs
- North Irish Brigade, a brigade of the British Army which existed between 1948 and 1968
- North Irish Division, Royal Artillery, an administrative grouping of garrison units in Ireland from 1882 to 1889.
- North Irish Horse, a yeomanry unit of the British Territorial Army

== See also ==
- Northern Ireland
- North of Ireland
- Scottish and North Irish Yeomanry
