= Ireland (disambiguation) =

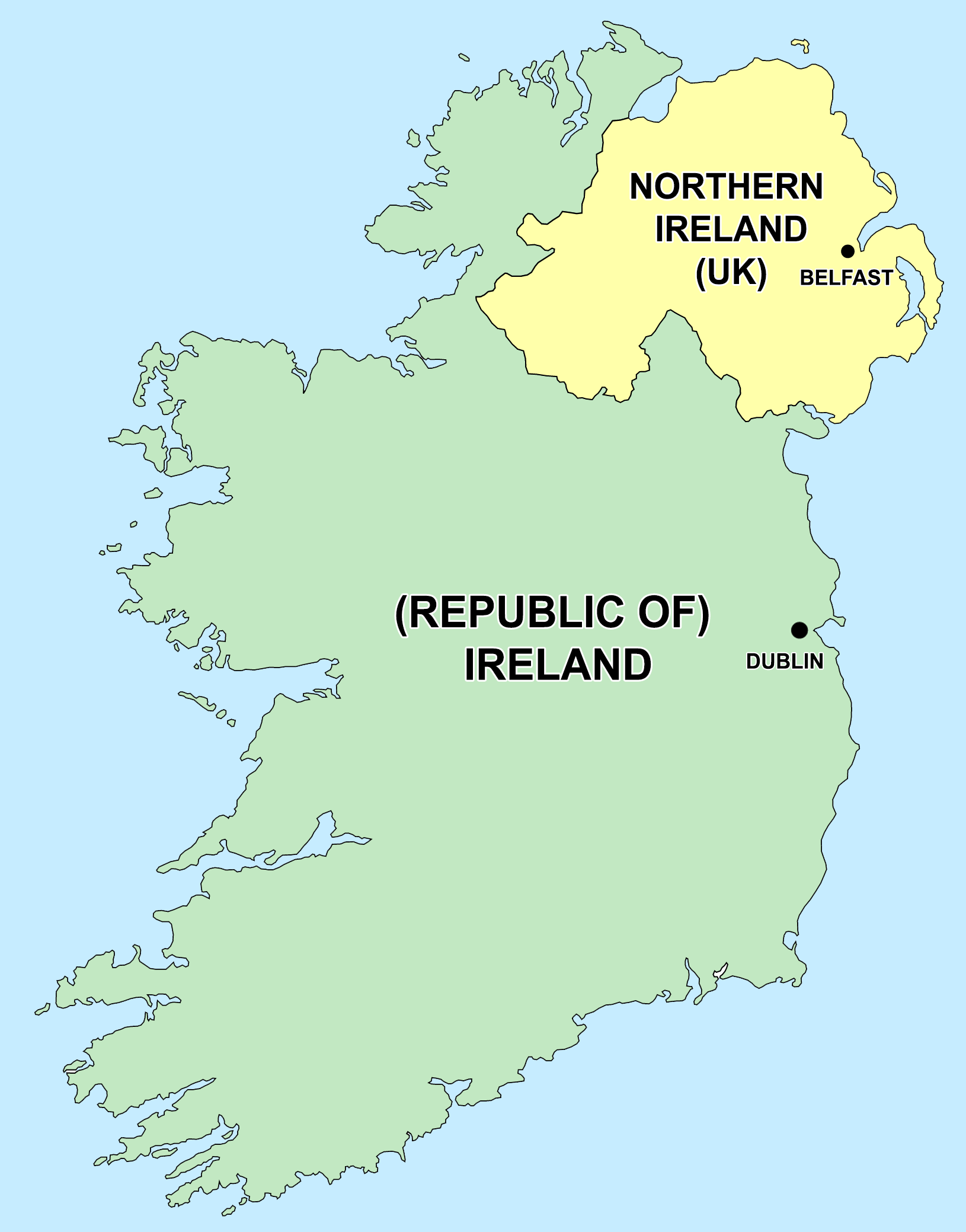
Location of the Republic of Ireland and Northern Ireland

Ireland is an island in the North Atlantic Ocean.

Ireland may also refer to:

== Polities currently located on Ireland ==
- Republic of Ireland, a sovereign state
- Northern Ireland, a part of the United Kingdom

== Former political arrangements of Ireland ==
- Gaelic Ireland, the political order that existed in Ireland before the Norman invasion
- Lordship of Ireland, a nominally all-island state created in the wake of the Norman invasion of the east coast of Ireland in 1169
- Kingdom of Ireland, a state from 1541 to 1800, in personal union with England and Scotland
  - Confederate Ireland (1642–1649), an Irish government that controlled about two thirds of Ireland during the Commonwealth (or Interregnum)
  - Irish Republic (1798), a short-lived French client republic proclaimed during the Irish Rebellion of 1798
- Ireland (1801–1921), a constituent country of the United Kingdom from 1801 to 1921
  - Irish Republic (1916), a short-lived unrecognised independent state that existed in parts of Dublin during Easter Week
  - Irish Republic, an unrecognised independent state declared between 1919 and 1922
- Southern Ireland (1921–1922), a constituent country of the United Kingdom from 1921 to 1922, established on the same day as Northern Ireland
- Irish Free State, a dominion from 1922 to 1937, comprising briefly all of Ireland and thereafter 26 of the island's 32 counties, ending when the state adopted the name "Ireland" in December 1937

== Other places ==
=== Papua New Guinea ===
- New Ireland Province
  - New Ireland (island), largest island in the province

=== England (United Kingdom) ===
- Ireland, Bedfordshire, a hamlet
- Ireland Wood, suburb of Leeds

=== United States ===
- Ireland, Indiana, an unincorporated community
- Ireland, Texas, an unincorporated community
- Ireland, West Virginia, an unincorporated community

=== Other countries ===
- Ireland Island, Bermuda
- Ireland, Nova Scotia, Canada, a locality
- Island of Ireland, part of the failed World Islands development in Dubai, United Arab Emirates

== People ==
- Ireland Baldwin (born 1995), American fashion model
- Ireland Thomas (1875–1955), American stage performer, newspaper columnist, and theater manager
- Ireland (surname), a surname (including a list of people with the name)

== Other uses ==
- Justice Ireland (disambiguation)
- RMS Empress of Ireland, an ocean liner that sank in May 1914 after a collision
- United Ireland, a current political movement

== See also ==
- Irish (disambiguation)
- Names of the Irish state
- Acts of Union 1800
- Government of Ireland Act 1920
- Constitution of Ireland (1937)
- The Republic of Ireland Act 1948
- Munster Republic
- North of Ireland
- Southern Ireland (disambiguation)
