= Cheap Wine (band) =

Italian rock band

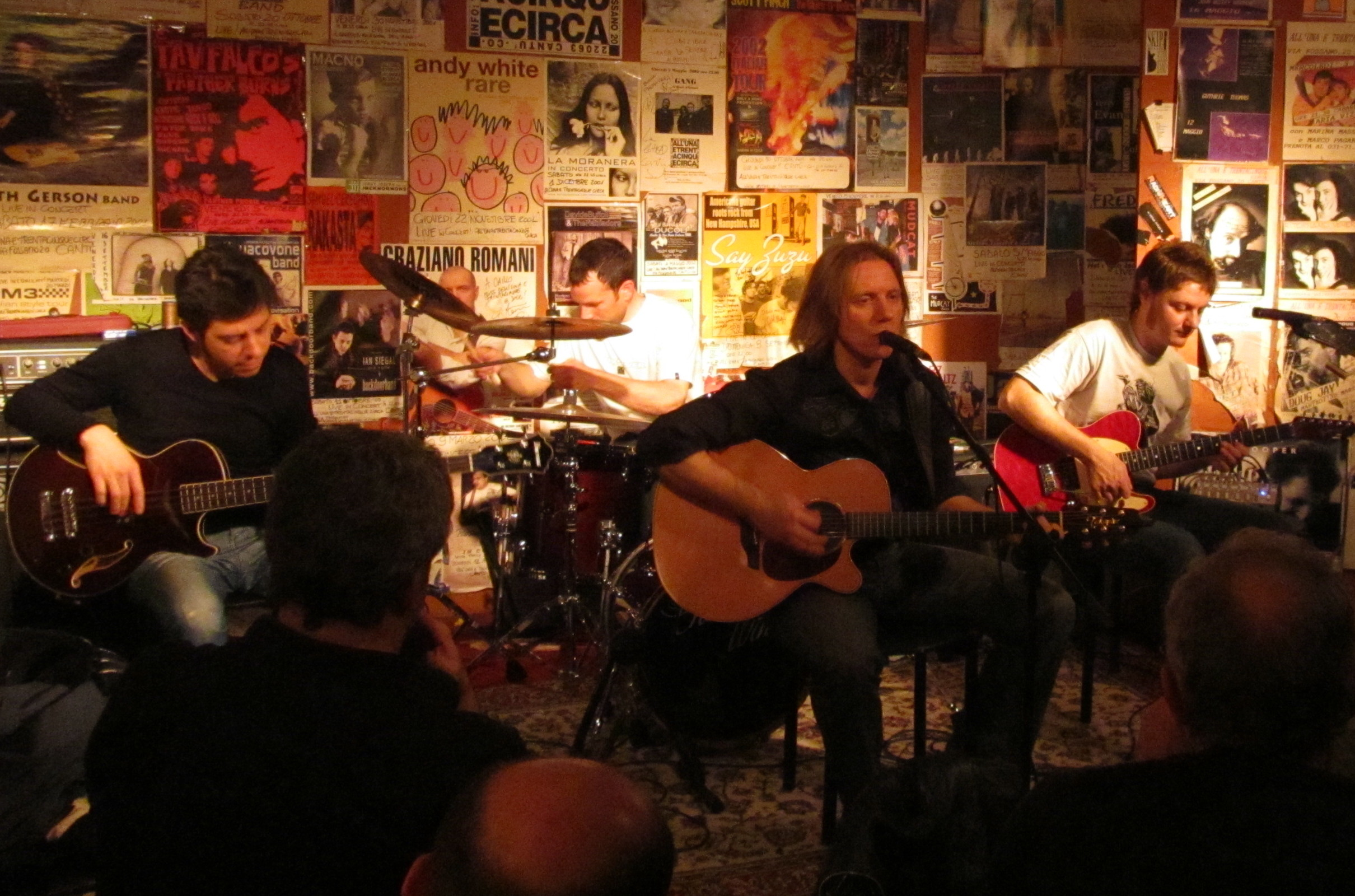
- Cheap Wine on acoustic live

Background information
- Origin: Pesaro, Italy
- Genres: Rock
- Years active: 1997–present
- Labels: CWR/Venus
- Members: Marco Diamantini – vocals, guitars; Michele Diamantini – guitars; Alessandro "Fruscio" Grazioli – bass; Alan Giannini – drums; Alessio Raffaelli – keyboards
- Past members: Francesco "Zano" Zanotti – drums
- Website: cheapwine.net

Cheap Wine is an Italian rock band from Pesaro. The name is borrowed from the Green on Red same-titled song appeared on Gravity Talks album. They take inspiration from songwriters rock like (Neil Young, Bob Dylan) as well as Paisley Underground scene with veins of southern rock.

== Biography ==
The band released its own debut in 1997, the EP Pictures (Toast Records).

Next year the band made a choice to remain independent about sounds and to maintain the lyrics in English and so they choose the self release with music distribution by Venus Dischi.

With the help of sound technician Alessandro Castriota they published the first album A better place in 1998, that was well received on Italian music magazines and fanzines.

The next albums Ruby Shade(2000), Crime Stories(2002) (concept album about crime which was selected among the best 15 Italian albums of the year by the notable music magazine Il Mucchio Selvaggio), Moving (2004) (concept about travel with the personal Bob Dylan's cover of "One more cup of coffee") and Freak Show (2007) contributed to make the group a little legend in Italian musical underground.

In 2008 the drummer, Francesco Zanotti, left and was replaced later by Alan Giannini.

In the 2009 the band published the live DVD "Just Like Bob Dylan's Blues" recorded at Brabante theatre in Urbania nel 2003. In summer they played some songs at the presentation of the new Bruce Springsteen's album Working on a Dream on Milan's Rolling Stone stage. In September a new disc: Spirits with 2 personal cover Townes Van Zandt's "Pancho & Lefty" and Dylan's "Man In The Long Black Coat", and 9 original tracks. "La buveuse" is dedicated to the same picture of painter Toulouse-Lautrec. The album received very good reviews on the specialized magazines such as Buscadero whose readers elected the disc best Italian album of the year. as well as the roots-rock oriented webzine Rootshighway The national radio RAI-Radio1 made a special about Cheap Wine on Saturday night.

In October 2010 the band released the first live album "Stay Alive!", 2 discs with 21 songs of which two covers, Bruce Springsteen's "Youngstown" and "Rockin' in the Free World" (Neil Young), recorded during three different concerts.

In 2011 Alessio Raffaelli (keyboards), former member of Miami & the Groovers (rock 'n' roll band from Rimini) joined the band. In October 2012 the band released its ninth work, Based on Lies.

== Discography ==
=== Albums ===
- 1997 – Pictures (EP)
- 1998 – A better place
- 2000 – Ruby Shade
- 2002 – Crime Stories
- 2004 – Moving
- 2007 – Freak Show
- 2009 – Spirits
- 2010 – Stay Alive! (2 CD)
- 2012 – Based on Lies
- 2014 – Beggar Town
- 2015 – Mary and the Fairy
- 2017 – Dreams
- 2019 – Faces
- 2022 – Yell

=== Compilation ===
- 2008 – Riot on sunset vol.14
