= John Ireland (disambiguation) =

John Ireland (1914–1992) was a Canadian-American actor and film director.

John Ireland may also refer to:

- John de Courcy Ireland (1911–2006), Irish historian and activist
- John Ireland (bishop) (1838–1918), Irish-born American Catholic bishop
- John Ireland (composer) (1879–1962), English composer
- John Ireland (cricketer) (1888–1970), English amateur cricketer
- John Ireland (philatelist) (1882–1965), British philatelist
- John Ireland (pirate) (fl. 1694–1701), American pirate
- John Ireland (politician) (1827–1896), American politician
- John Ireland (Anglican priest) (1761–1842), English Anglican priest and philanthropist
- John Ireland (South African musician) (born 1954), South African pop musician
- John Ireland (sportscaster) (born 1963), American sportscaster
- John Ireland (theologian) (fl. 1459–1495), Scottish theologian, diplomat, and priest
- John Ireland (writer), (died 1808), British author
- John Busteed Ireland (1823–1913), American lawyer, writer, and landowner
- Jon Ireland (born 1967), Australian tennis player
- John Scotus Eriugena (c. 815–877), Irish theologian, philosopher, and poet

== See also ==
- John Ireland Blackburne (1783–1874), British politician, father of the man born 1817
- John Ireland Blackburne (1817–1893), British army officer and politician, son of the man born 1783
- Jack Ireland (born 1999), Australian Paralympic swimmer
