= John de Courcy Ireland =

Irish maritime historian and political activist (1911–2006)

- Born: 19 October 1911; Lucknow, United Provinces of Agra and Oudh, British India
- Died: 4 April 2006 (aged 94); Dublin, Ireland
- Occupation: Non-fiction writer
- Political party: Socialist Workers Party; Democratic Socialist Party; Labour Party
- Spouse: Beatrice Haigh
- Children: 3

Academic background
- Education: University of Oxford; Trinity College Dublin
- Thesis: The Influence of the Sea on Civilisation

Academic work
- Discipline: Maritime history

John Evan de Courcy Ireland (19 October 1911 – 4 April 2006) was an Irish maritime historian, political activist and teacher. His early life was marked by dissatisfaction with the British education system and a fascination with the sea. After studying history at Oxford, he became active in leftist politics, contributing significantly to the Labour Party and later the Democratic Socialist Party, while being involved in many others over the course of his life. de Courcy Ireland was a prominent maritime historian who specialised in Ireland's nautical history. He had a distinguished teaching career while also being involved in numerous social and political causes, including anti-war, anti-nuclear and anti-apartheid movements.

== Early life and education ==
De Courcy Ireland was born at Lucknow, India, son of British Army major de Courcy Ireland and Gabrielle (née Byron). His father, a County Kildare native from an Irish landed gentry family, was stationed at Lucknow at the time of his son's birth. When World War I broke out, de Courcy Ireland's father joined his regiment in an Anglo-Japanese expeditionary force that besieged the German-controlled Chinese port of Tsingtao (Qingdao). After contracting typhoid fever, he died in Beijing in January 1915, reportedly saying on his deathbed: "Don't let that child join the British army". de Courcy Ireland's mother remained in China for a number of years while he was returned to Ireland. She would return remarried, or as de Courcy Ireland recalled: "with an absolutely ghastly stepfather for me".

de Courcy Ireland was educated at Marlborough College, Oxford University and Trinity College Dublin, where he was awarded a PhD in 1951. The title of his thesis was "The Influence of the Sea on Civilisation".

de Courcy Ireland's pre-university education was largely unhappy. He attended various schools, including a Church of Ireland preparatory school in London, which he recalled as cruel, and Marlborough College, where he developed a strong dislike for the British establishment due to its class system. School holidays were spent with his grandmother in Ireland, who taught him the Irish language, and with his mother and stepfather in Rome. His stepfather, aiming to prepare him for a British civil service career, clashed with his mother and grandmother over John's education.

Fascinated by the sea from an early age, de Courcy Ireland left Marlborough College at 17 to work as a steward on a Dutch cargo ship bound for Buenos Aires. He found life aboard the ship more civilised than his English public school experience and spent the next year sailing between Europe and South America. During this time he taught himself Spanish and Portuguese, and the stark contrasts in wealth and poverty he observed in Latin America awakened his social conscience. This year at sea shaped the three dominant themes of his life: the sea, social justice, and internationalism.

After winning a scholarship, John de Courcy Ireland studied history at New College, Oxford (c.1930–34), becoming the college's first scholarship student. During university holidays, he engaged in merchant seafaring and canoeing. Active in the Irish society and the Liberal club, he later leaned towards leftist politics.

== 1934 to 1949 ==
After graduating, de Courcy Ireland and his wife moved to Manchester, where he taught at Bury Grammar School between 1934 and 1937 as well as engaging in freelance journalism and political activism. He joined the British Labour Party and supported the Socialist League of Stafford Cripps. Active in the Gaelic League and a China relief society, he frequently visited Dublin and Belfast. A summer 1935 visit to Dublin, where he met James Larkin, profoundly influenced de Courcy Ireland, reinforcing his socialism and shaping his view of Irish nationalism. Although initially enamoured with the Soviet Russian model, Larkin's disillusionment with Stalinism gradually affected de Courcy Ireland's thinking. Nevertheless, de Courcy Ireland did not publicly criticise the USSR until condemning the Soviet-led invasion of Hungary in 1956.

Commissioned by Penguin books to write a book on the partition of Ireland and the border in 1938, de Courcy Ireland spent time on the Aran Islands improving his Irish before moving to Muff in County Donegal. Although the book project was cancelled due to World War II, de Courcy Ireland remained in Ireland, contributing to Dublin socialist publications and supporting republican prisoners' aid campaigns. He joined the Derry branch of the Northern Ireland Labour Party and served on the party's executive but was expelled in 1940 for advocating for an All-Ireland federation. During the wartime Emergency, he patrolled the border and coast with the Local Security Force and worked on the US naval base construction in Lough Foyle. After being dismissed for trade union activities, he applied for and secured a position as a history teacher at St Patrick's Cathedral Grammar School in Dublin, where he would be employed from 1942 until 1949.

== Political activism in Dublin in the 1940s ==
Joining the Irish Labour Party, de Courcy Ireland played a key role in its significant growth in Dublin during the early 1940s. This period saw an expansion of membership and branches, increased electoral success (such as a majority on Dublin Corporation in August 1942) and a rise in radicalism and militancy within the party. de Courcy Ireland contributed to Torch, the party's radical socialist publication, and became secretary of the Dublin Central branch, which brought together various leftist groups in a time of political and social upheaval.

In February 1943, a reorganisation of the Dublin branches led to the creation of a new Dublin executive, which was dominated by militants who secured all key positions, with de Courcy Ireland elected as the executive's secretary under James Larkin Jnr as chairman.

As a protégé of both Larkins, de Courcy Ireland was deeply involved in the factional conflict with William O’Brien, general secretary of the ITGWU. He managed Jim Larkin Snr's successful 1943 general election campaign, leading to Larkin's election as TD for Dublin North East. However, in the aftermath of their success Fianna Fáil's Seán MacEntee and the Catholic Standard publicly accused Labour's Dublin branches of having been inflated by communists such as de Courcy Ireland, and suggested that de Courcy Ireland was a foreign spy working under an assumed name. In response the Labour Party investigated 17 members, but ultimately did not expel Jim Larkin Jnr nor de Courcy Ireland. This lead led to a split: The ITGWU disaffiliated from Labour, and several of the party's TDs left Labour to form the National Labour Party.

In April 1944, Ireland was expelled from the Labour Party for alleged communist sympathies after attending the annual conference of the Communist Party of Northern Ireland in October 1943. Although he appealed, and his expulsion was later annulled, he remained effectively barred from the party for four years. During this period, he co-edited Review, a leftist publication. He rejoined the Labour Party in 1948 and frequently urged Jim Larkin Jnr to seek the party leadership as a leftist alternative to William Norton.

== Political activism in the 1980s and 1990s ==
de Courcy Ireland remained active in the Labour Party into the early 1980s, campaigning against Ireland's entry into the European Economic Community and contributing to the leftist periodical Tribune. Disillusioned by Labour's coalition with Fine Gael and its stance on Northern Ireland, he joined Socialists Against Nationalism (1980) and supported independent TD Jim Kemmy's call for the repeal of articles 2 and 3 of the Irish constitution. He helped launch the Democratic Socialist Party (DSP) in 1982, advocating a 'socialist, secular, and post-national' ideology. De Courcy Ireland opposed the Eighth Amendment to the Irish constitution (which prohibited abortion) and contested elections for the DSP; He unsuccessfully contested the Dún Laoghaire constituency at the November 1982 general election and was unsuccessful again at the 1984 European Parliament election when he stood in the Dublin constituency. De Courcy Ireland continued to promote socialist politics, opposing the DSP's merger with Labour and later supported Democratic Left until its own merger with Labour in 1998. Thereafter de Courcy Ireland joined the Socialist Workers Party.

A passionate campaigner and speaker, Ireland was involved in numerous organisations focused on peace, social justice, and civil rights. He was a founding member of the Irish Campaign for Nuclear Disarmament and participated in Teachers for Peace, the Bertrand Russell Peace Foundation, Irish Voice on Vietnam, and the Irish Anti-Apartheid Movement. He was also active in the Irish Arab Society and the Irish–Chinese Cultural Society, advocating for balanced criticism of China's human rights record while acknowledging its economic and social progress. From the mid-1990s until his final illness, he was active in the Irish Anti-War Movement, opposing various US-led conflicts and military use of Shannon airport.

A pacificist who opposed all forms of war, de Courcy Ireland was a vocal left-wing opponent of the Provisional IRA and other Irish republican paramilitary groups. de Courcy Ireland was a supporter of Josip Broz Tito's Socialist Federal Republic of Yugoslavia, which de Courcy Ireland believed was a "fascinating non-aligned example of workable socialism".

== Maritime interests ==
Early in his career, de Courcy Ireland advocated for the development of Irish marine resources, inspired by Poland's maritime success. He conducted pioneering research in Irish maritime history, becoming an internationally recognised maritime historian. de Courcy Ireland wrote or edited nearly a dozen books and numerous papers on the subject, focusing on neglected aspects of Irish maritime history and aiming to revive Ireland's maritime economy. His notable works include The Sea and the Easter Rising (1966), Ireland's Sea Fisheries: A History (1981), Wreck and Rescue on the East Coast of Ireland (1983), Ireland and the Irish in Maritime History (1986), and The Admiral from Mayo (1995).

In 1943 he was a founder of the Maritime Institute of Ireland, an educational charity first founded at Dún Laoghaire, and in 1959 of the Maritime Museum in Dún Laoghaire. de Courcy Ireland was instrumental in establishing the National Maritime Museum of Ireland and contributed his extensive collection of nautical artefacts. He was also a long-time volunteer with the Royal National Lifeboat Institution (RNLI), saving the Dún Laoghaire lifeboat station from closure and receiving several honours from the organisation. Additionally, he co-edited collections of scholarly papers and was a founding member of the Inland Waterways Association of Ireland and the Military History Society of Ireland.

An avid traveller, Ireland used his language skills to explore countries of political and scholarly interest, including Yugoslavia, Algeria, and France. He was fluent in Irish and spoke French, Spanish, Italian, German, Serbo-Croat and Portuguese. He regretted that he could only read Norwegian.

As chairman of Dún Laoghaire Harbour Watch (late 1980s to early 1990s) and a founding member of Save Our Seafront (early 2000s), John de Courcy Ireland campaigned against private development proposals for Dún Laoghaire harbour and seafront, citing concerns about public access restrictions. In 1988, his diplomatic efforts led Taoiseach Charles J. Haughey to suspend the project and consult with local interests, with Haughey praising Ireland's reasoned and gentlemanly approach. Ireland had previously commended Fianna Fáil's maritime policy and Haughey's interest in marine issues.

== Personal life ==
In 1932 de Courcy Ireland married Beatrice 'Bet' Haigh, an Englishwoman of half-Irish descent who was a nurse in Barcelona during the Spanish Civil War. Their marriage, which produced three children, was described by John as "a time of constant joy and interest, and frequently of excitement and positive emotion".

In later life de Courcy Ireland was a member of the Unitarian congregation in Dublin.

== Death and legacy ==
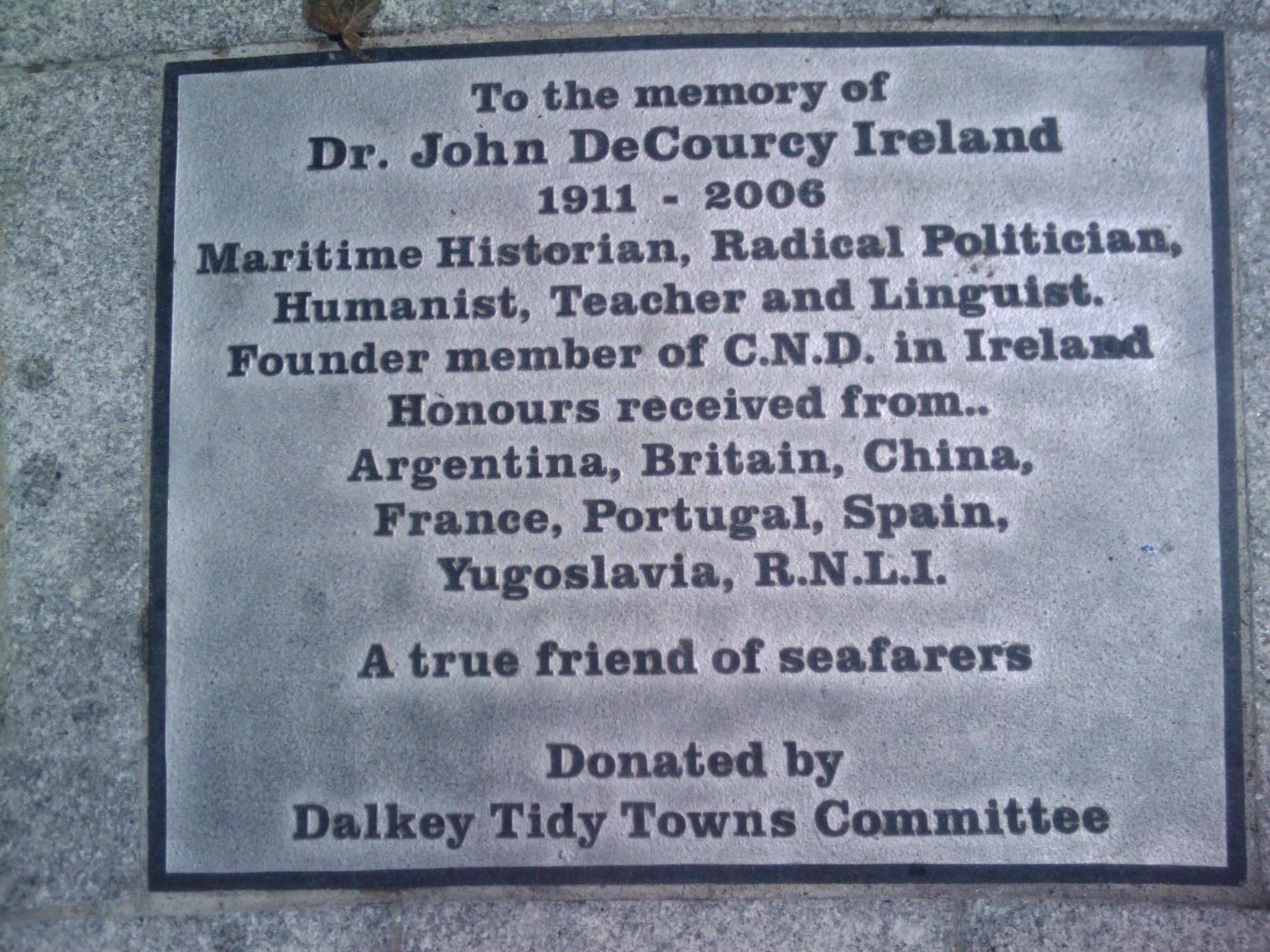
Plaque to John de Courcy Ireland in Dalkey

John de Courcy Ireland died in 2006 at Clonskeagh Hospital, aged 94. A plaque in his memory was erected in Dalkey. It reads:

To the memory of Dr John DeCourcy Ireland 1911–2006

Maritime Historian, Radical Politician, Humanist,
Teacher and Linguist. Founder Member of C.N.D. in Ireland.
Honours received from Argentina, Britain, China,
France, Portugal, Spain, Yugoslavia, R.N.L.I.
A true friend of seafarers

== Recognition ==
John de Courcy Ireland had been a Council member of the Maritime Institute of Ireland, who operate the National Maritime Museum of Ireland, for 55 years and was its Honorary Research Officer. He was awarded the following:

- Portuguese Order of Prince Henry
- Order of the Yugoslav Flag
- Order of Spanish Naval Merit
- Order des Palmes Acadamiques of France
- Member of Marine Academies of France
- Member of Marine Academies of Portugal
- Caird Medal of the British National Maritime Museum
- Member of Instituto Browniano (Argentina)
- Centenary Medal of Almirante Brown (Argentina)
- Hon. Life Governor of the Royal National Lifeboat Institution

The Award he valued most was the plaque in the Peoples' Park, Dún Laoghaire, as it was the only award that coupled his name with that of his wife, Betty. The Maritime Institute of Ireland, posthumously awarded him its gold medal; it was accepted by his daughter on his behalf.

== Publications ==
- History of Dun Laoghaire Harbour, John De Courcy Ireland – 2001, ISBN 978-0-946130-27-6
- Lifeboats in Dublin Bay, a review of the service from 1803–1997, John De Courcy Ireland – 1997, ISBN 978-0-9533540-0-9
- The Sea and the Easter Rising. John De Courcy Ireland – 1996 (first version), ISBN 0000002585/ISBN 9780000002587
- Ireland's maritime heritage, John De Courcy Ireland – 1992, ISBN 978-1-872228-09-9
- Ireland and the Irish in Maritime History, John De Courcy Ireland – 1985, ISBN 978-0-907606-28-4
- Wreck and Rescue on the East Coast of Ireland, John De Courcy Ireland – 1983, ISBN 978-0-907606-09-3
- Ireland's Sea Fisheries: A History, John De Courcy Ireland – 1981, ISBN 978-0-907606-01-7
