= 210 (North Irish) Multi-Role Medical Regiment =

- Active: 2023–present
- Country: United Kingdom
- Branch: British Army
- Role: Medical
- Size: Regiment; 250–300 personnel
- Part of: 2nd Medical Group
- Garrison/HQ: Belfast

210 (North Irish) Multi-Role Medical Regiment is a unit of the Royal Army Medical Service within the Army Reserve of the British Army.

== History ==
Under the Future Soldier programme, 204 (North Irish) Field Hospital amalgamated with 253rd (North Irish) Medical Regiment to form the new 210 (North Irish) Multi-Role Medical Regiment in September 2023. The new regiment falls under the 2nd Medical Group within 1 Division.

== Current Structure ==
The hospital's structure at the time of amalgamation was as follows:

- Headquarters, at Belfast.
