= North of Ireland =

North of Ireland may refer to:

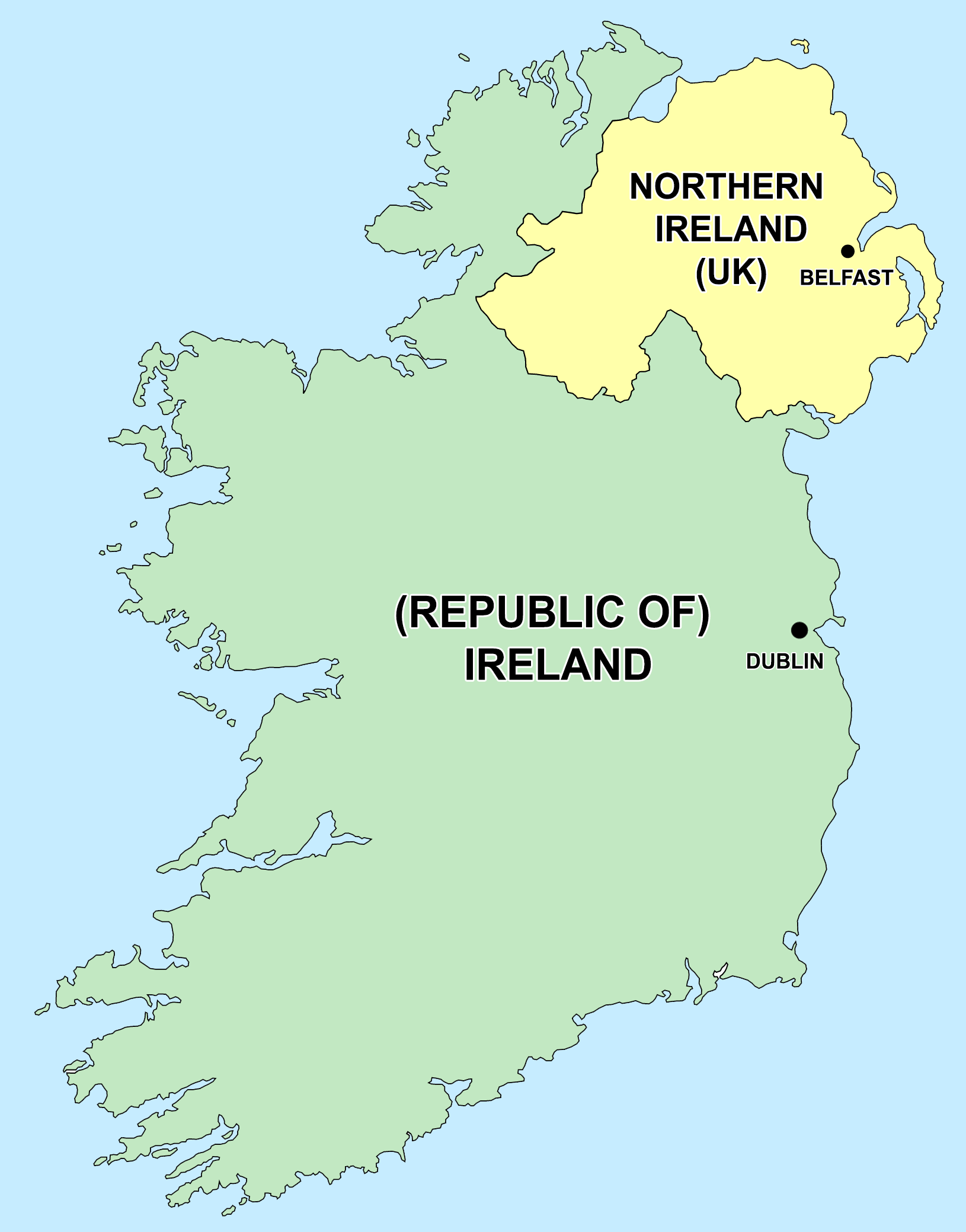
Location of the Republic of Ireland and Northern Ireland

- Northern Ireland, a part of the United Kingdom in the north-east of the island of Ireland
- Ulster, a traditional or historic Irish province, made up of 9 counties: 6 in Northern Ireland and 3 in the Republic of Ireland
- the northern part of the island of Ireland

== See also ==
- North Irish (disambiguation)
- Alternative names for Northern Ireland
- Republic of Ireland, or Ireland, a country
- Ulster (disambiguation)
- Southern Ireland
- Ireland (disambiguation)
