= Maritime Institute of Ireland =

- Established: 1941
- Founder: Colonel Anthony Lawlor
- Type: Non-profit
- Location: Dublin, Ireland
- Services: Maritime preservation, education, public outreach
- President: Joe Varley
- Website: Maritime Institute of Ireland website

The Maritime Institute of Ireland (MII) was founded in 1941, at a time when World War II was raging and many seamen were in great peril of either being severely injured or losing their lives. Ireland, being an island nation, was dependent on the sea for all forms of movement external to the island as well as for many goods, particularly fuels that were required to keep the economy going. There was therefore a resurgence of interest in all things to do with the sea.

== Role ==
In 1941, during a critical period in Irish history, the Maritime Institute of Ireland (MII) was founded. At that time, Europe was on the brink of war, and Ireland's reliance on maritime links raised concerns about the potential impact of the conflict. Colonel Anthony Lawlor, the longest-serving president of the Institute, and other founders advocated for the recognition of the growing threat and the importance of safeguarding Ireland's maritime interests.

The Institute organized a variety of activities to promote its goals, including public lectures on maritime topics, film screenings related to maritime themes, and contributions to the public and specialized maritime press. It also hosted Maritime Weeks, which featured poster displays, lectures, film nights, and library exhibits on maritime subjects. Additionally, deputations were sent to the government to raise awareness of these issues. These efforts eventually led to the formation of the National Maritime Museum of Ireland, which operates both a library and a museum.

== Achievements ==
1943-45 First and Second Maritime Weeks held in Dublin

1945 Irish Maritime Survey launched, later taken over by Irish Shipping and organised as Follow the Fleet in 1967.

1949 Schools "Ship Adoption Scheme" launched

1952 Annual Seafarers Memorial Services inaugurated in Dublin

1955 Winter Film Show and later public lectures commenced in Dublin

1956 Institutes Research Department opened under John de Courcy Ireland. Today networked with 40 other countries

1958 Submission to Government and public meeting on need for maritime Search and Rescue helicopters. Air Corps helicopters were introduced, 1963 after sinking of M/V Halronel

1959 First Maritime Museum opened at St.Michael's Wharf, Dun Laoghaire

1967 Mariner's Church was acquired from the Church of Ireland to use as the National Maritime Museum support for Institute Plan to build Seamen's Memorial for those lost in Irish ships during the 1939-45 War.

1969 Report to Government on coastal shipping resulted in establishment of Short Sea Shipping Association, now the Irish Chamber of Shipping.

1974 Mariner's Church was acquired from the Church of Ireland to use as the National Maritime Museum

1976 Report to Government on need for new patrol vessels for Irish Naval Service.

1977 Joint group established with Marine Officers, Seafarers and Docker's Unions to erect a National Seamen's Memorial

1978 National Maritime Museum of Ireland opened by Dr. Patrick Hillery, President of Ireland. Cork branch established

1979 European Museum of the Year Awarded to the National Maritime Museum.

1980 First Edition of Register -Ships of Ireland published.

1984 First State Historic Wreck Preservation on the Queen Victoria, sunk off Howth.

Second Edition of Register - Ships of Ireland published.

1989 Death of Institute founder, Col. Tony Lawlor.

1990 Dr. Patrick Hillery, President of Ireland, unveils the Irish National Seamen's Memorial at City Quay, Dublin.

1991 First Institute Council members in the UK and USA.
Dundalk Branch established.

1994 President Mary Robinson opens the 50th Anniversary Exhibition of the Kerlogue Rescue. 168 German seamen were rescued in the Bay of Biscay. Survivors attended.

1995 Dun Laoghaire Rathdown County Council agrees adoption of Irish Navy Flagship LE Eithne on Institute initiative.

1996 Gulbenkian Award for Best Volunteer Museum was presented by President Mary Robinson to the National Maritime Museum of Ireland.

2012 Museum reopened

2014 Library and Archive reopened

== Donations ==
In 1950 the institute was given a notable collection consisting of ship models, (some unique), charts, uniforms, maritime pictures and books all of which were donated under the terms of the will of the two daughters of one of the 19th century's great Irish seamen, Captain Robert Halpin of Wicklow. Captain Halpin had made history by laying the first successful oceanic cables in the North and South Atlantic and Indian Oceans as well as the Mediterranean Sea. The ship used for this work was Brunel designed Great Eastern, which for nearly half a century was the world's largest steamship. A model of this, made under Halpin's supervision, is one of the famous items in the Institute's "Halpin collection".

== Foundation of an Irish Maritime Fleet ==
The Irish Marine Service played an important role in setting up the first Irish fisheries protection fleet. Seamus Ó Muiris, a former officer in the Royal Navy, had made persistent representations to successive Irish governments, favouring the creation of a fleet and was appointed as its Commander, when approved. In this, he had been strongly supported by Colonel Anthony Lawlor, the wartime Commander of the Marine Coast Watching Service. The first vessel purchased by the government was the HMY Helga, which was renamed Muirchú after independence.
