= Robert Halpin =

Irish sailor

Robert Halpin DL JP RNR FRGS
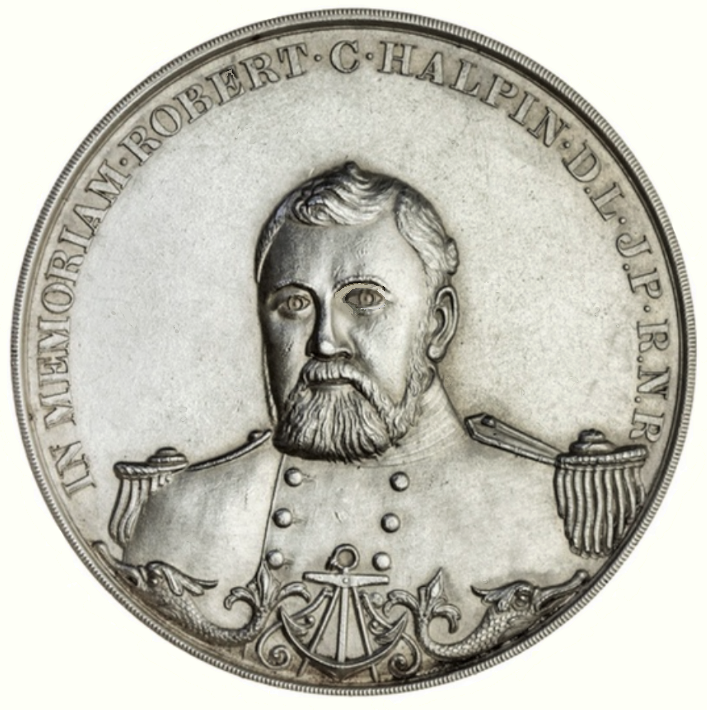
- Depiction on the Halpin Memorial Medal
- Born: 16 February 1836; Wicklow, Ireland
- Died: 20 January 1894 (aged 57); Tinakilly, County Wicklow, Ireland
- Other name: Mr. Cable
- Occupation: Sailor
- Years active: 1846–1870s
- Known for: Laying transoceanic telegraph cables

Robert Charles Halpin DL JP RNR FRGS (16 February 1836 – 20 January 1894) was an Irish sea captain. He captained the Brunel-designed steamship SS Great Eastern which laid transoceanic telegraph cables. A successful pioneer of this work, he earned the nickname "Mr Cable".

== Early life ==
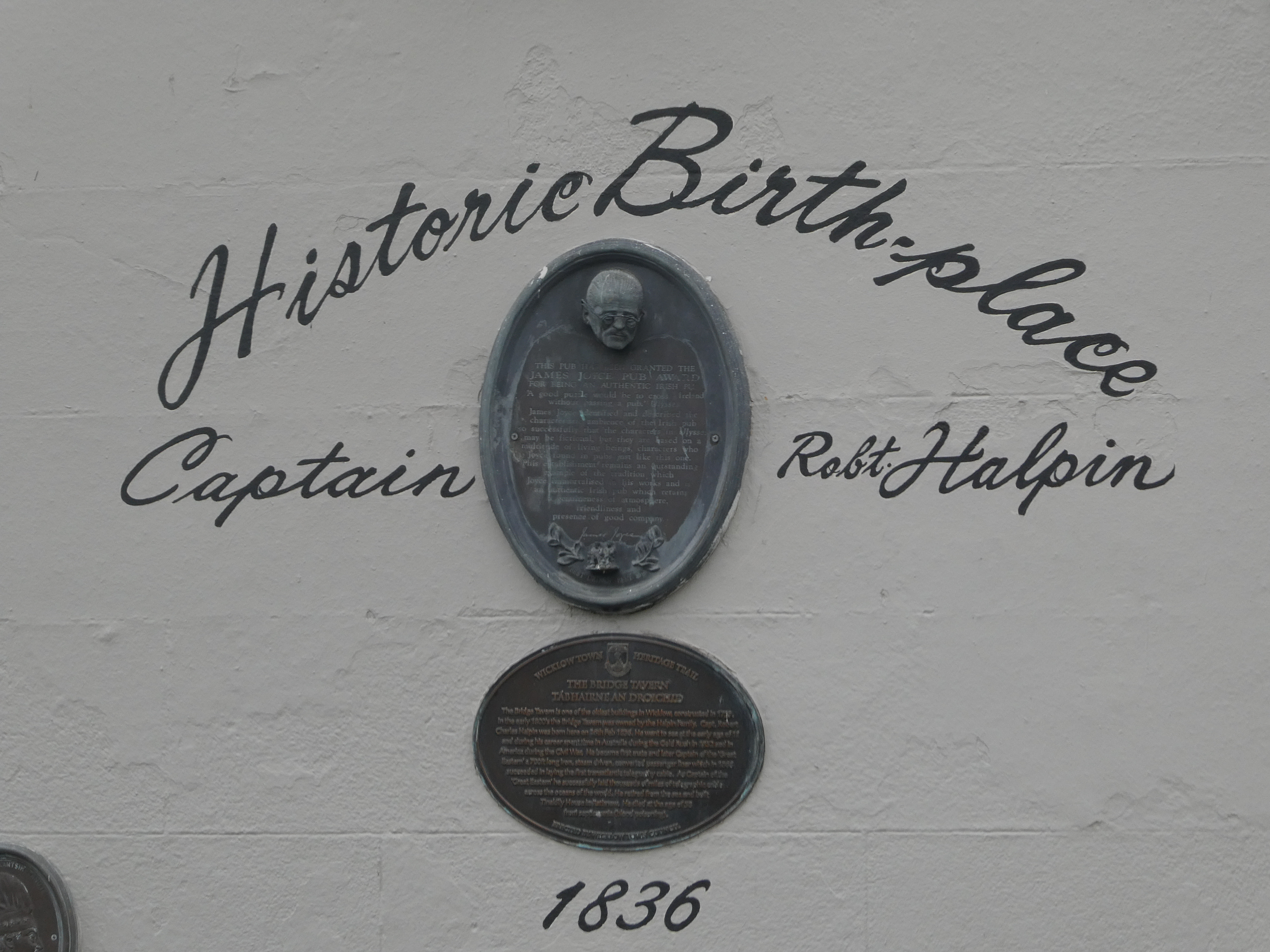
Decorative plaques on the Bridge Tavern, Wicklow, Halpin's birthplace

He was the son of James and Anne Halpin (née Halbert), the youngest of 13 children. His father, James, was the proprietor of a small tavern and the family were reasonably well off. From an early age, Robert showed a fondness for the sea. He received his early education at a nearby private school. Halpin appears to have shown little interest in formal education and with his imagination fueled by tales of faraway lands recounted by mariners in his father's tavern, he left home at age ten to become a seafarer.

== Nautical career ==
He joined the brig Briton that was engaged in the Cumberland coal trade and was shipwrecked off Bude, Cornwall in 1851 with many lives lost, but Halpin managed to reach the shore.

He joined the crew of the 388-ton barque Henry Tanner, later that same year. Henry Tanner plied the Britain – Australia run and Halpin's first voyage to Australia coincided with the Australian Gold Rush of 1852. Over half the crew jumped ship to seek their fortunes in the gold fields. Unable to muster a crew, Henry Tanner was forced to remain in port until the absent crewmen returned to their posts.

Halpin then joined the ship Boomerang as a third mate. Boomerang worked on the Liverpool to Melbourne to Kio (Ecuador) route, returning with a cargo of guano, bird droppings used as fertiliser.

Halpin was promoted to second mate of Salem, a wool clipper on the Australia run, before he transferred over from sail to steam ships. Halpin believed steam was the future of shipping and became first officer in Khersonese.

At 22 years of age, he was given command of the S.S.Propellor, later joining Circassian, both steamships belonging to the Atlantic Royal Company. In 1858 Halpin became involved in a new sea route that had started from Galway, Ireland to St. John's, Newfoundland, giving a quicker, shorter Atlantic crossing. Emigration from Europe to North America was the new large shipping trade and operated from major ports such as Liverpool, Hamburg and Galway. By 1859 the Galway line was prospering and the popular S.S.Argo was commanded by Halpin, then aged 24. Disaster struck in August 1859 while in thick fog at the Newfoundland fishing banks when Argo struck an iceberg and sank. At the subsequent enquiry, Halpin lost his master's ticket. Despite this setback in 1860 the Spanish Government commissioned him to deliver two troop ships, Isla de Cuba and Isla de Puerto Rica, to South America.

At the break out of the American Civil War, Halpin ran the Union blockade bringing supplies to the Confederate States and returning with cotton to Europe. In 1864 he was forced to run his ship aground to evade capture but was then detained by the Northern Union forces. The case against him was unproven and he was released after the Battle of Mobile Bay.

It was then that Halpin began his association with the steamship Great Eastern. In his book The Great Iron Ship, author James Dugan states, "the first and in some ways the most interesting of the ocean liners was the Great Eastern, brainchild of the legendary Isambard Kingdom Brunel."

=== Great Eastern ===
Launched at the Isle of Dogs, Kent, on 31 January 1858, she was 693 feet in length (over 200 metres), 22,500 tons dead weight, and had accommodations for over 3,000 passengers. Five times larger than any other ship then built, she had six masts, five funnels, 6,500 yards of sail, two 58 ft paddle wheels, a 24 ft screw (which remains the biggest ever built) and a coal-carrying capacity of 15,000 tons.

Great Eastern had a career dogged by misfortune. She was designed for the longer Britain to Australia run and proved uneconomical when used on the shorter Atlantic routes. Her maiden voyage was to the United States, leaving Southampton on 16 June 1860 with 418 crew, but only 35 paying passengers, and arriving on 28 June. Never filled to capacity and losing money, the vessel was sold from company to company and in 1867 was chartered by a French syndicate to bring American visitors to the Paris World Exhibition. She attracted only 191 passengers including Jules Verne who later wrote a book about her called A Floating City (Une ville flottante, 1871).

=== Telegraphy ===
Before the 1860s there was great interest in Telegraphy and the linking of Europe to North America by telegraphic cable. The first successful cable was laid in August 1858. Queen Victoria of the United Kingdom exchanged congratulations briefly with the American President James Buchanan. This first success proved the telegraph could be done underwater, but it didn't last a week after a workman applied too much voltage and overheated the cable.

Pioneered by Cyrus Field, mainland Europe had been connected by telegraphy, as had Europe to Britain and Britain to Ireland. A company was formed that converted Great Eastern into a cable layer and Halpin was given the post of First Officer. Their task was to lay a submarine transatlantic telegraph cable from Valentia Island, County Kerry to Heart's Content, Newfoundland. The cable, 2,600 miles long was stored in the ship's tanks and weighed 6,000 tons.

1,862 miles from Valentia, the cable broke and Great Eastern returned to Europe. In 1866, with Halpin at the helm, the ship returned to the exact spot, recovered and repaired the broken cable. In July that year, Great Eastern arrived at Heart's Content, Newfoundland and completed the connection between the continents which has never been interrupted since.

Later, as captain, Halpin laid an estimated 26,000 miles (41,800 km) of cable (more than enough to circle the globe). The cable routes included the French Transatlantic Cable from Brest to St. Pierre and Miquelon in 1866 (under the patronage of Paul Julius Reuter), the 1869 Bombay-Aden-Suez cable, and the Australia-New Zealand-East Indies, Madras-Singapore-Penang, and Madeira-Brazil.

For Halpin's services, Brazilian Emperor Pedro II made him Knight of the Order of the Rose. He was also awarded the French Légion d'honneur and elected a Fellow of the Royal Geographical Society. In 1889 he was appointed an honorary Commander in the Royal Naval Reserve. His circle included Lord Kelvin, who had been aboard Great Eastern overseeing the cable laying, Admiral Sherard Osborn, who proposed him for Fellowship of the Royal Geographical Society, the American oceanographer Matthew Fontaine Maury, Alfred Lord Tennyson, Ferdinand de Lesseps, and Edmund Dickens, nephew of Charles Dickens amongst other notables of the day.

== Later career ==
On returning to Wicklow c.1875 after a brief residence near London, Halpin became chairman of the Wicklow Gas Company, Wicklow Harbour Master and Secretary of Wicklow Harbour Commissioners. He was Secretary of the Wicklow Harbour Commissioners in 1880 when the East Breakwater was built – arguably the most important built structure in the small maritime port's history. He ran for Member of Parliament for East Wicklow as a Unionist in July 1892, losing to John Sweetman, the Anti-Parnell Home Rule candidate.

He was married to Jessica Munn of Heart's Content, Newfoundland. They had three daughters, Ethel, Belle and Edith. The last daughter, Belle, died in 1952.

=== Tinakilly House ===
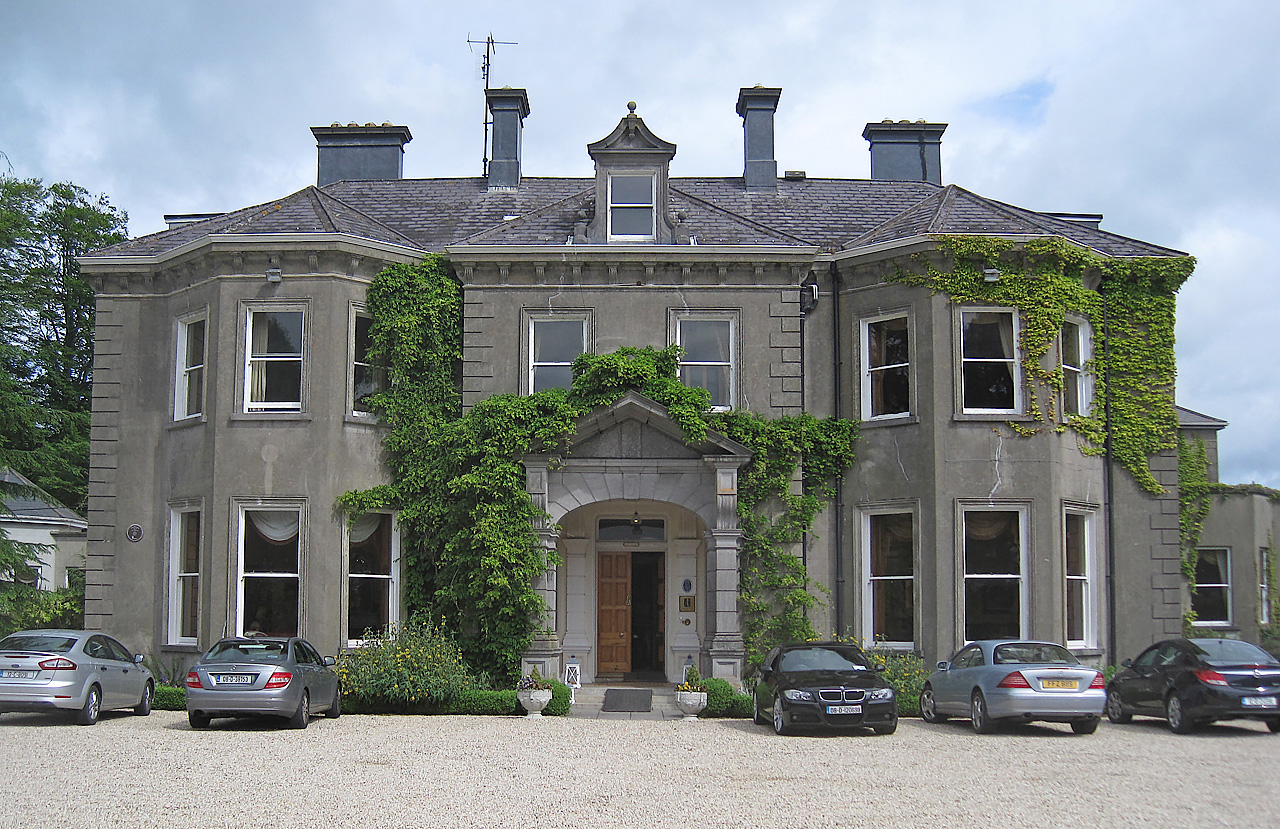
Tinakilly House Front View

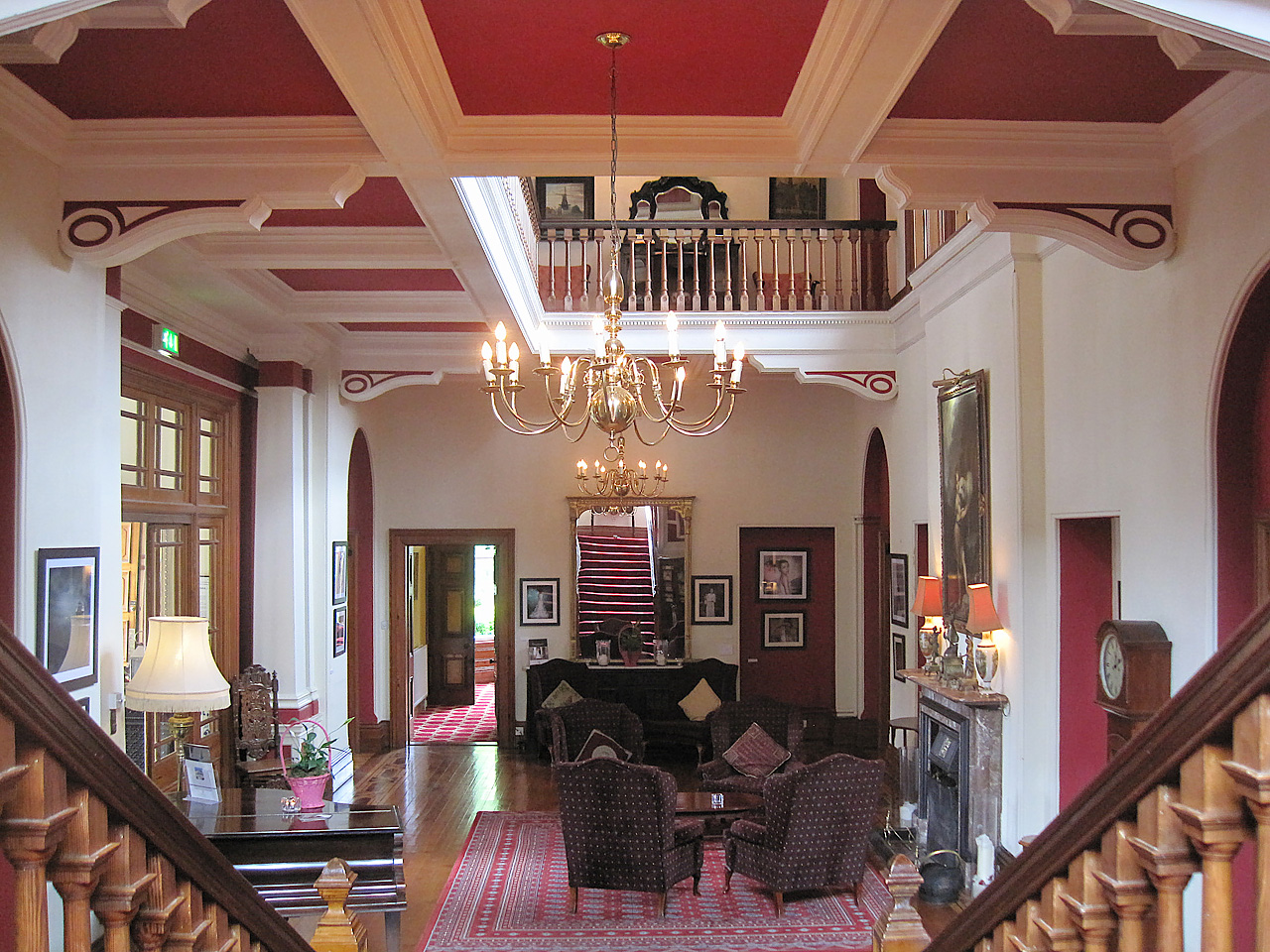
Tinakilly House Inside View

Halpin was rewarded by the British Government for his contribution to improving world communications and thereby world trade. In 1876 Halpin purchased a site on elevated ground two miles north of Wicklow Town, overlooking the Irish Sea. Here he built a house, named Tinakilly, the name derived from the townland of Tinakilly on which the house is built.

He recruited the fashionable Irish architect James Franklin Fuller to design the house. It had many opulent features and cost £40,000 to build, (equivalent to £4,205,089 in 2025), its 400 acres including an extensive rose garden. The house is now a hotel and retains many of its original features.

At Tinakilly on 20 January 1894 Robert Halpin, aged 57, died of gangrene resulting from a minor cut while trimming his toenails. He is buried, as are others in his family, at the Wicklow Parish Church with a Celtic Cross headstone marking the grave.

== Memorials ==
Many artefacts from his life were donated by his daughters to the Maritime Institute of Ireland. There is a display in the National Maritime Museum of Ireland, Dún Laoghaire.

=== Obelisk ===
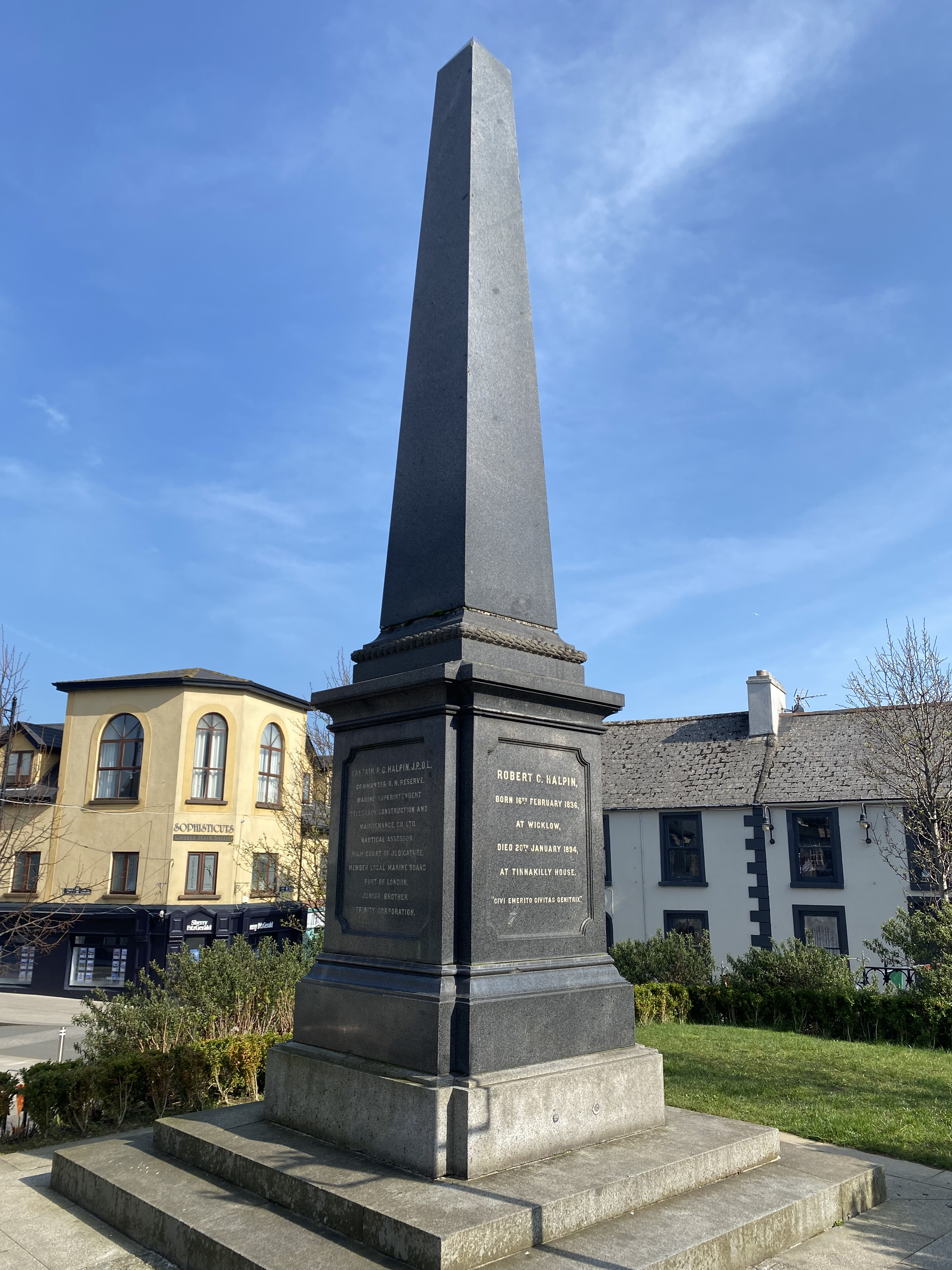
The obelisk in Wicklow

A granite obelisk, erected in 1897, in the centre of Wicklow town commemorates his life and career. The land for the obelisk was donated by William Wentworth-Fitzwilliam, 6th Earl Fitzwilliam and has since been called Fitzwilliam Square.

=== Halpin Memorial Medal ===
After the fund closed for the Wicklow obelisk, a further £397 and 13 shillings came from London. Not being required for the obelisk, this sum funded the Halpin Memorial Medal, an annual prize for the best boy and girl swimmer at the Merchant Seamen's Orphan Asylum (Royal Merchant Seamen's Orphanage from 1922, and later the Royal Merchant Navy School and then Bearwood College). The annual award continued for about seventy years until the 1960s.

The award was a silver medal, 50 millimetres (2.0 in) in diameter, bearing on the obverse the image of Halpin in Royal Naval Reserve uniform with the inscription 'IN MEMORIAM. ROBERT C HALPIN, DL, JP, RNR.' The reverse design varied over time but included the current name of the institution.

== See also ==
- List of people on the postage stamps of Ireland
