= Gary Ireland =

Australian cricketer

Personal information
- Full name: Gary John Ireland
- Born: 3 October 1961 (age 65); Collie, Western Australia
- Batting: Right-handed
- Role: Batsman

Domestic team information
- Years: Team
- 1984/85–1986/87: Western Australia

Career statistics
Competition	First-class	LA
Matches	8	2
Runs scored	151	18
Batting average	16.77	9.00
100s/50s	0/1	0/0
Top score	50	10
Catches/stumpings	6/–	0/–
- Source: CricketArchive, 22 December 2012

Gary John Ireland (born 3 October 1961) is a former Australian cricketer who played several matches for Western Australia in the mid-1980s.

Born in Collie, Western Australia, Ireland made his debut at state level late in the 1984–85 season, playing two Sheffield Shield matches in place of Kim Hughes, who was on national duty. He was a more regular selection the following season, playing in six matches during the first half of the season, but due to poor form was overlooked in favour of Rob Gartrell and Peter Gonnella towards the end of the season. Ireland finished the season, his last at first-class level, with 129 runs at an average of 18.42. His sole half-century (and highest first-class score) was an innings of 50 runs against South Australia in October 1985, which included a 103-run partnership with Mike Veletta.

Ireland played only one further match at state level after the conclusion of that season, a game in the limited-overs McDonald's Cup competition in October 1986. He had been selected on the basis of his form in two trial matches, but scored only 10 runs, and was not selected again. At grade cricket level, Ireland played for the Bayswater-Morley District Cricket Club, captaining the club to a championship. He later played for the Mount Lawley District Cricket Club, also captaining this club.
