= Darkbuster =

American punk rock band

- Origin: Boston, Massachusetts, United States
- Genres: Punk, Hardcore punk, Oi!
- Years active: 1996–2001, 2003-2008, 2009, 2015
- Label: I Scream Records
- Members: Lenny Lashley; Amy Griffin; Danny O'Halloran; Mike Gurley
- Past members: Paul Delano; Eric Edmonston
- Website: http://www.darkbuster.net/

Darkbuster is a punk rock band from Boston, Massachusetts, United States, known primarily for their songs celebrating heavy drinking. The band occasionally performs under the name of P Diddler And The Fearsome Foursome.

== History ==
The band was formed in 1996 by singer/guitarist Lenny Lashley, drummer Eric Edmonston, and bassist Mike Gurley. In 1997 the band recorded a nine-song demo tape, and in 1999 released their debut album, 22 Songs You'll Never Want To Hear Again!, which featured songs about beer, social alienation, and diss tracks towards other local bands. Shortly after they released a split EP titled Skullbuster, with the Skullys, a high school punk band from Stoughton, Massachusetts, including the songs "Waste of Life," "Join the NRA," and "Some Cunt Sneezed on my Sub".

In 2000 the band added a second guitarist, Paul Delano. Danny O'Halloran replaced Edmonston as the group's drummer a few months later, and this lineup of Lashley, Gurley, Delano, and O'Halloran won the WBCN Rock & Roll Rumble that year.

In 2001 the band recorded five songs for a split EP with Tommy and the Terrors. Lashley decided to dissolve the band the same week, following a difficult month-long U.S. tour.

Lashley continued writing songs and formed a country band, Lenny and the Piss Poor Boys, in 2002. Gurley moved on to The U.S.M., then to The McGunks, while O'Halloran joined The Marvels, and Delano joined Avoid One Thing. Following his departure from the band, Edmonston formed a group called Linus.

In May 2005, Lashley injured his left hand in a construction accident at Boston University, leaving him unable to play guitar for several months. The band temporarily brought Amy Griffin in as a second guitarist. A DVD containing concert footage of Darkbuster and Lenny and the Piss Poor Boys was released shortly after the accident, with proceeds going to help Lashley with his medical bills. A 2005 benefit concert featuring both of Lashley's bands performing with guest singers raised further money. Shortly after that, in December 2005, it was announced that Edmonston would again be leaving the band at the end of the year, with Griffin becoming a full member and Lashley returning to play guitar.

In May 2006 the band signed with I Scream Records, who re-released A Weakness For Spirits in August 2006. The band was reported to be compiling footage for a 10th anniversary DVD.

Although never announcing their official breakup, the band stopped performing and went on a hiatus. On December 27, 2009, Darkbuster played their first show in almost two years at Boston's House Of Blues for the 12th Mighty Mighty Bosstones' Hometown Throwdown.

In 2015, Darkbuster released No Revolution on Pirates Press Records, accompanied by several nights of "Reunion" concerts in August 2015, though without many of the original members.

== Discography ==
- 22 Songs You'll Never Want To Hear Again! (1999)
- Skullbuster (1999)
- Live N' Loaded At The Middle East (2000)
- Darkbuster Vs. Tommy & The Terrors (2001)
- A Weakness For Spirits (2005)
- No Revolution (2015)
