= Southern Ireland =

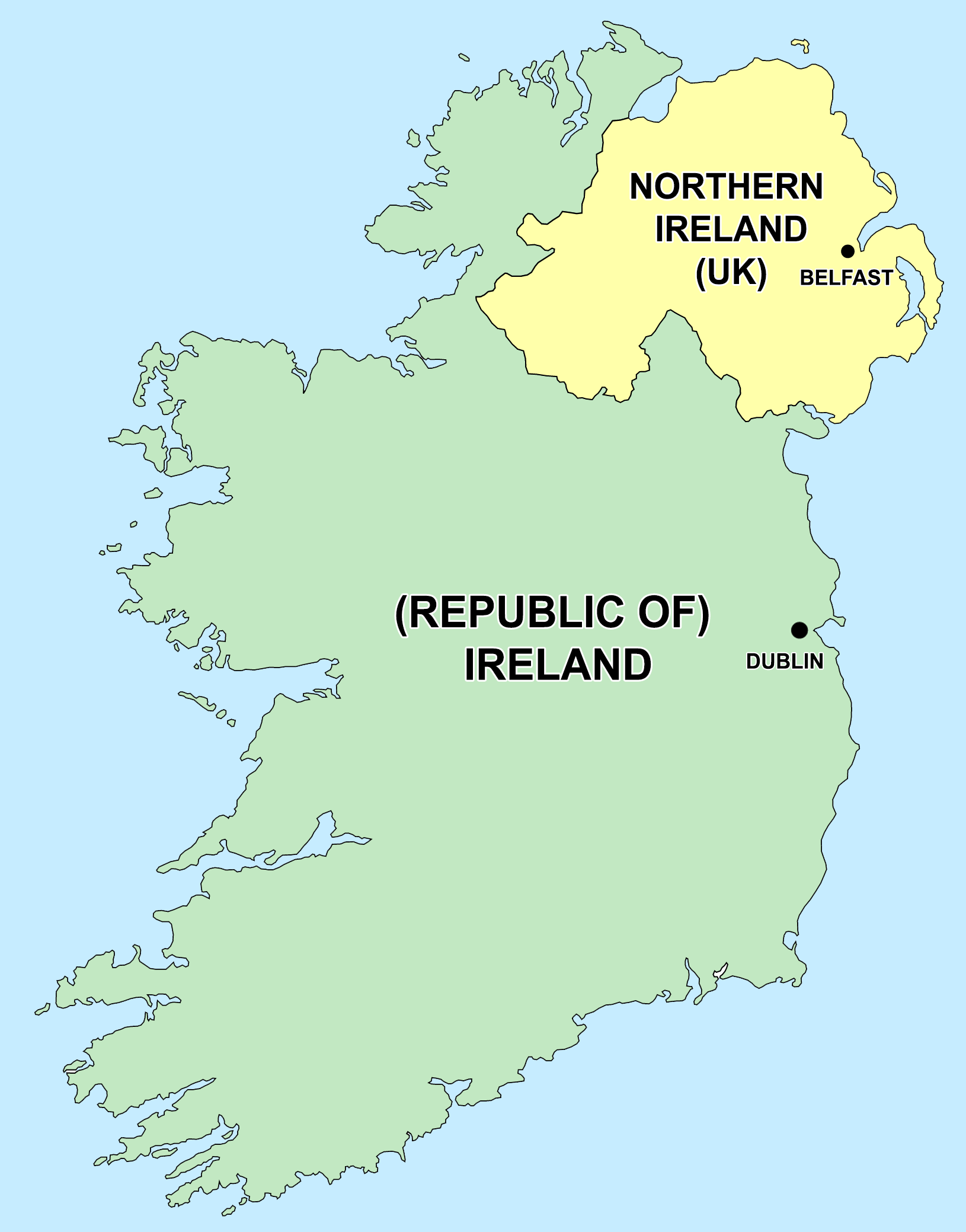
Location of the Republic of Ireland and Northern Ireland

Southern Ireland, South Ireland or South of Ireland may refer to:

- The southern part of the island of Ireland
- The Republic of Ireland
- Southern Ireland (1921–1922), a former constituent part of the United Kingdom
- South (European Parliament constituency)
- Southern, IE05, one of the level 2 NUTS statistical regions of Ireland

== See also ==
- Munster, the southernmost province of Ireland
- South-East Region, Ireland
- South-West Region, Ireland
- Northern Ireland, a constituent part of the United Kingdom
- North of Ireland
- Ireland (disambiguation)
