= Mark Ireland =

Mark Ireland may refer to:

- Mark Ireland (artist) (born 1960), Australian artist, composer, musician, and film- and video maker
- Mark Ireland (priest) (born 1960), Archdeacon of Blackburn in 2016
