= 22 Songs You'll Never Want to Hear Again! =

22 Songs You'll Never Want To Hear Again!

Studio album by Darkbuster
- Released: 1999
- Genre: Oi!
- Length: 33:00
- Producer: Darkbuster

Darkbuster chronology
22 Songs You'll Never Want To Hear Again! (1999)	A Weakness For Spirits (2004)

22 Songs You'll Never Want To Hear Again is an album by Boston-based punk band Darkbuster. The album was self-released in 1999.

== Track listing ==
No.	Title	Length
1.	"That's Correct"	1:47
2.	"Nothing At All"	2:35
3.	"Lillith Fair"	1:53
4.	"Motown"	2:09
5.	"Amazing Royal Shaft"	2:04
6.	"Hell On Wheels"	1:15
7.	"Jerk"	0:05
8.	"Bud"	1:52
9.	"Lenny's A Drunk"	0:06
10.	"Hometown Zero"	2:00
11.	"Miller"	0:46
12.	"Pub"	2:08
13.	"I Hate The Unseen"	3:38
14.	"You Jerk"	0:05
15.	"Happy Days"	1:48
16.	"Caught In A Trap"	0:33
17.	"Cheap Wine"	2:03
18.	"Pippi Longstocking (Is A Redheaded Bitch)"	1:38
19.	"FMGMS"	0:12
20.	"You Fucking Jerk"	0:06
21.	"Space Cowboy"	2:39
22.	"Irish"	1:45
