= Il Mucchio Selvaggio =

Italian magazine, 1977–2018

- November 1980 issue, featuring Bruce Springsteen
- Categories: Music magazine
- Frequency: Monthly
- Publisher: Stemax
- Founder: Max Stefani, Paolo Carù and Aldo Pedron
- Founded: 1977
- Final issue: 2018
- Country: Italy
- Based in: Rome
- Language: Italian
- ISSN: 1121-354X

Il Mucchio Selvaggio (lit. 'The Wild Bunch') was an Italian monthly music magazine published between 1977 and 2018. It has been described as 'a piece of Italy's cultural, social and political history'.

== History and profile ==
The magazine was founded by Max Stefani, Paolo Carù and Aldo Pedron in Rome in 1977 as a monthly music magazine, mostly focused on rock music. Initially centered on American and British classic rock, it gradually broadened its scope to include new trends such as punk and new wave, as well as the Italian rock scene.

In 1980, the co-founders Carù and Pedron abandoned the magazine to fund a rival magazine, Buscadero. Another major split happened in the late 1980s, when most of the staff left the magazine to join Velvet, a competing magazine founded by the former Mucchio collaborators Maurizio Bianchini, Federico Guglielmi and Eddy Cilia, but in spite of it, the magazine kept selling strong. In September 1996, the magazine underwent a major reorganization, becoming weekly, and adopting a smaller format at a lower price. In 2001, Federico Guglielmi, who in the meanwhile had reprised his collaboration, launched a quarterly spin-off Mucchio Extra, which was published until mis-2010s. Starting from 2005, the magazine reprised its monthly frequence and its classical format.

Following the abandon of its founder Max Stefani in 2011, and a scandal involving the public funds that the magazine had received and which had been used for personal purposes, the magazine went into crisis, eventually ending its publications in 2018 after 41 years and 767 issues.

== See also ==
- List of magazines in Italy
