= Mark Ireland (artist) =

- Born: 1 January 1960 (age 66); Sydney, Australia
- Occupations: Artist, composer, musician, film maker
- Years active: 1980–present
- Known for: Clan Analogue (1990–2020)

Mark Ireland (born 1 January 1960 in Sydney, Australia) is an Australian artist, composer, musician, film and video maker and member of Clan Analogue the Australian Artists collective.

== Life and career ==
Mark started playing professionally at 19 years of age with the band Straight Angles playing jazz, soul, pop and rock.

He produced a compact disc called Straight Angles Compilation and took it to London, New York and Tokyo. It included original compositions created with the Fairlight C.M.I. Computer Music Instrument. He formed the group Carrier and released a compact disc titled 'The Foley Artists' that is available at CDBaby. Remixes are available at BandCamp.

== Discography ==
Mark Ireland's original music is mainly Electronic Music although it often includes orchestral instruments.

- Straight Angles Compilation – 1988
- Clan Analogue EP2 – EP release
- Freaky Loops – 2SER release
- CA014: COGNITION Various Artists
- CA038: RE COGNITION – THE CLAN ANALOGUE LEGACY COLLECTION Various Artists
- InTone – Clan Analogue – 2016
