= National Maritime Museum of Ireland =

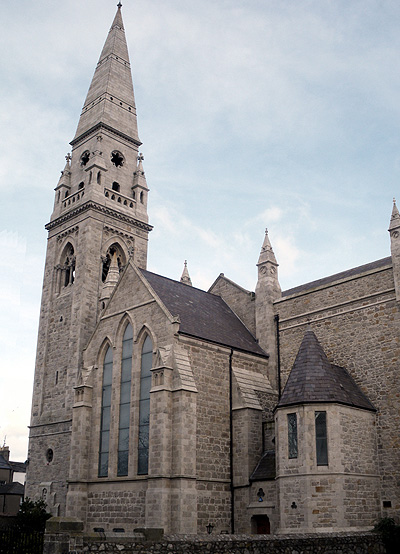
- Museum exterior

- Location within Dublin
- Established: 1978
- Location: Moran Park, Dún Laoghaire, Ireland
- Coordinates: 53.292156°N 6.131767°W
- Type: Maritime museum
- Public transit access: Dún Laoghaire railway station Dublin Bus 7, 7a, 45a, 46a, 59, 111
- Website: Maritime Institute of Ireland

The National Maritime Museum of Ireland (Irish: Músaem Mhuirí Náisiúnta na hÉireann) opened in 1978 in the former Mariners' Church in Moran Park, located between the seafront and the centre of Dún Laoghaire, County Dublin, Ireland. President Michael D. Higgins officially re-opened the museum in 2012.

== History ==
The church was built in 1837 for seafarers and remained open until 1971. In 1974 the Church of Ireland and the Maritime Institute of Ireland signed an agreement that led to the museum's opening.

In 2006 substantial funding was authorised by the Government for capital expenditure to cover the cost of the refurbishment, however this funding has since ceased, and the museum is now dependent upon door receipts, fund raising events and donations. It is operated by volunteers and a community employment scheme provided by the Department of Social Protection. In July 2011 two stained-glass windows by artist Peadar Lamb were installed in the former church, sponsored by the Dún Laoghaire Harbour Company. It reopened on 5 June 2012.

== Exhibits ==
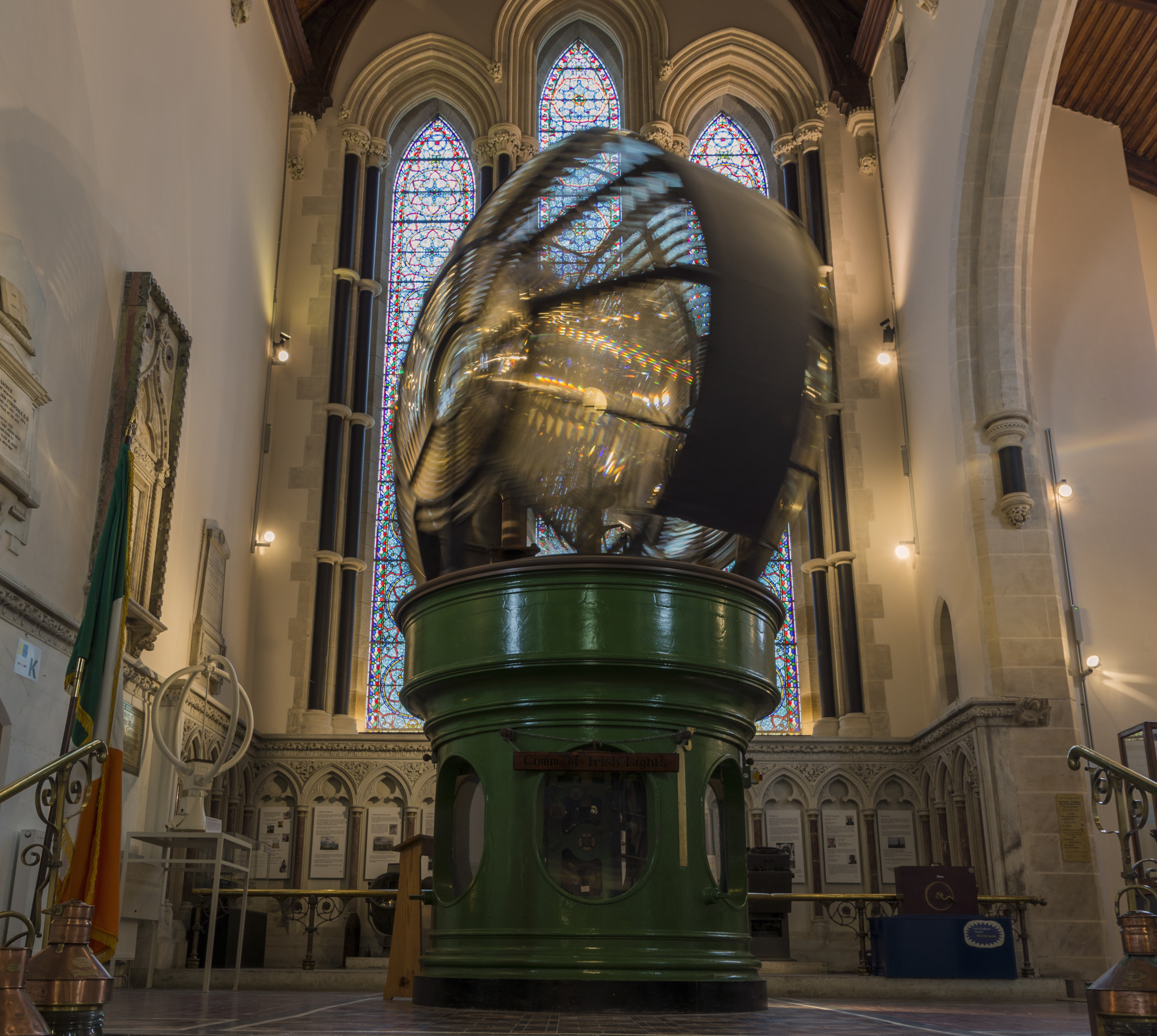
Baily Optic in National Maritime Museum of Ireland

- The Irish Lights: this exhibit is dominated by the Baily Optic from the Baily Lighthouse on Howth Head, which was in use from 1902 to 1972. It includes some inventions of John Richardson Wigham.
- The Great Eastern display: a history of the SS Great Eastern (designed by Isambard Kingdom Brunel) including items belonging to its captain Robert Halpin and a clockwork model of the ship.

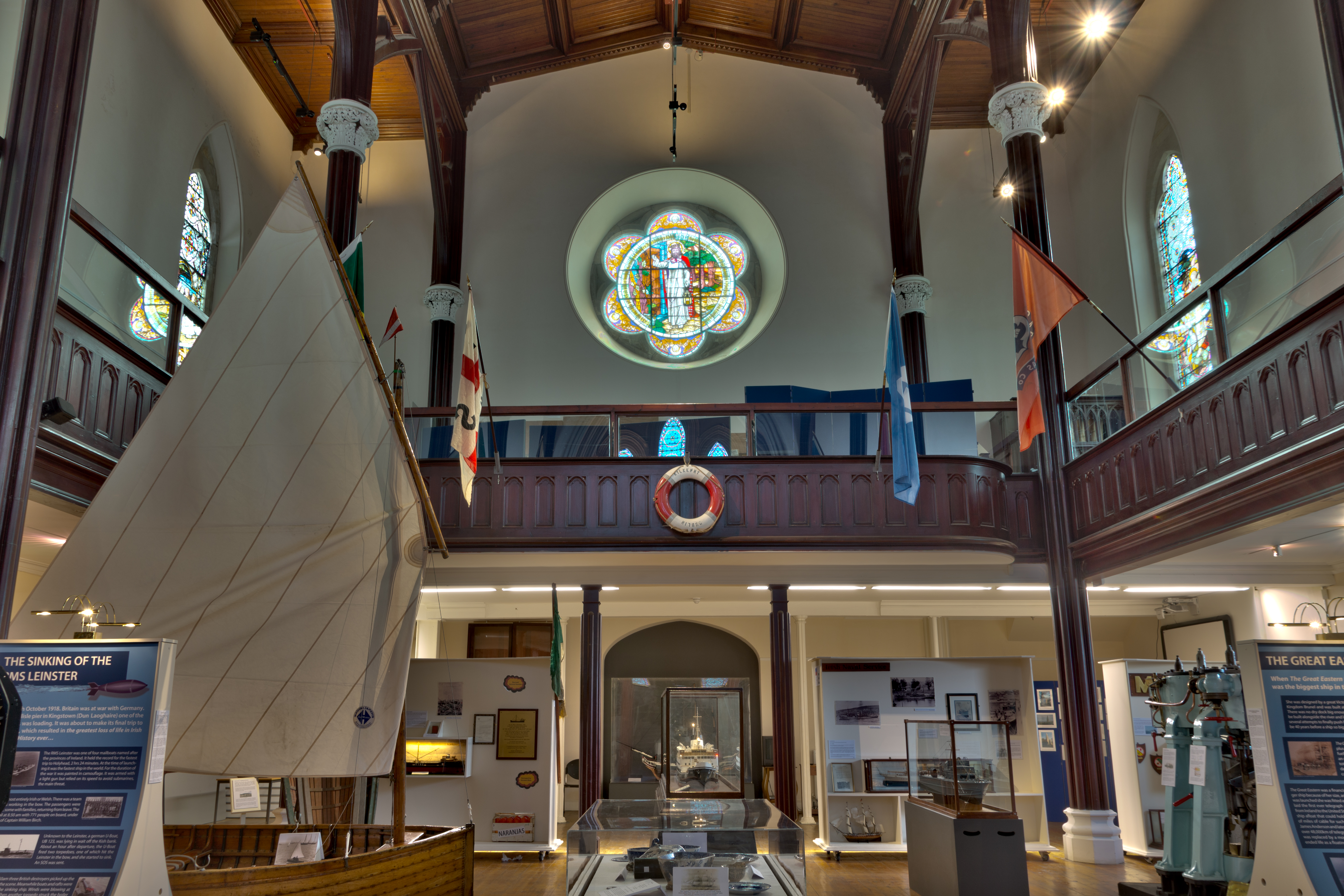
Exhibition in National Maritime Museum of Ireland

- Artefacts recovered from the wreck of the RMS Leinster and some contemporary accounts of the event. It was torpedoed in 1918 off the Kish lighthouse, within sight of Dún Laoghaire. Over 500 people were drowned. There are mirror-backed half-models of the City of Dublin Steam Packet Company's ships: RMS Ulster, RMS Leinster, RMS Munster and RMS Connaught.
- St Columba's Chapel: this area remembers Irish ships during World War II. There is a collection of paintings by Kenneth King and the bullet-holed flag of the MV Kerlogue. The Mariners Church building is also a major attraction.
