= Richard Ireland =

Richard Ireland may refer to:

- Richard Davies Ireland, Australian politician
- Richard Ireland (rower), British rower
- Richard Ireland (politician), Mayor of Jasper, Alberta
