= Justice Ireland =

Justice Ireland may refer to:

- Roderick L. Ireland (born 1944), chief justice of the Supreme Judicial Court of Massachusetts
- Faith Ireland (born 1942), associate justice of the Washington Supreme Court

== See also ==
- Chief Justice of Ireland
- Department of Justice (Northern Ireland)
- Department of Justice, Home Affairs and Migration
