= De Courcy Ireland =

Irish cricketer and British Army officer (1873–1915)

de Courcy Ireland
Personal information
- Full name: de Courcy Ireland
- Born: 1 August 1873; Henzada, Burma, British India
- Died: 28 January 1915 (aged 41); British Hong Kong or Peking, Republic of China
- Batting: Unknown
- Bowling: Unknown

Domestic team information
- Years: Team
- 1897/98: Europeans

Career statistics
Competition	First-class
Matches	1
Runs scored	15
Batting average	15.00
100s/50s	–/–
Top score	8
Balls bowled	15
Wickets	0
Bowling average	–
5 wickets in innings	–
10 wickets in match	–
Best bowling	–
Catches/stumpings	–/–
- Source: ESPNcricinfo, 12 October 2020

de Courcy Ireland (1 August 1873 – 28 January 1915) was an Irish first-class cricketer and British Indian Army officer.

The son of William de Courcy Ireland, a civil servant, he was born on 1 August 1873 on Henzada in British Burma. He was educated in both Ireland and Germany, before attending the Royal Military College, Sandhurst from which he graduated into the Royal Fusiliers as a second lieutenant December 1892. He transferred to the Indian Staff Corps in July 1897, at which point he was promoted to lieutenant. He took part in the 1897 Tirah campaign against the revolting Afridi tribe in the North-West Frontier Province. In September of the same year, Ireland made a single appearance in first-class cricket for the Europeans cricket team against the Parsees at Poona in the 1897/98 Bombay Presidency Match. Batting twice in the match, he was dismissed for 8 runs by Nasarvanji Bapasola in the Europeans' first innings, while in their second innings he was not out on 7, despite having come into bat at number four. Later serving with the 36th Sikhs, he was promoted to major in December 1910, having been made a captain prior to this. He married Gabrielle Bryan in December 1910, with the couple residing in England at Buckfastleigh, Devon. Their son, John de Courcy Ireland, would become a renowned maritime historian. Ireland was posted to the Republic of China in June 1914, where he stationed at the onset of the First World War. He died from fever in January 1915 at either British Hong Kong or Peking.
