= William Ireland =

William Ireland may refer to:

- William Ireland (Jesuit) (1636–1679), English Jesuit executed during the reign of King Charles II
- William Henry Ireland (1775–1835), forger of would-be Shakespearean documents and plays
- William Wotherspoon Ireland (1832–1909), Scottish physician and author
- William M. Ireland (died 1891), co-founder of the National Grange of the Order of Patrons of Husbandry
- William Henry Ireland (politician) (1884–?), Ontario merchant and political figure
- William Ireland (tennis), Irish tennis player
- Bill Ireland, founder of the UNLV football program and later athletic director of UNLV
