= Alexander Ireland =

Alexander Ireland may refer to:

- Alexander Ireland (boxer) (1901–1966), Scottish amateur and professional welter/middleweight boxer
- Alexander Ireland (journalist) (1810–1894) was a Scottish journalist, man of letters, and bibliophile
