= Chris Ireland =

American pharmacist

Chris Ireland is an American pharmacist, currently the Dean and L. S. Skaggs Presidential Endow Chair for Pharmacy and Distinguished Professor at University of Utah.

== Education and Training ==
Ireland completed his Bachelor's in Chemistry from the University of California, San Diego, in 1973. He then completed his PhD in Oceanography four years later at Scripps Institute of Oceanography.

== Awards ==
Ireland received the Rosenblatt Prize for Excellence in 2021.
