= George Ireland (disambiguation) =

George Ireland (1913–2001) was an American basketball coach.

George Ireland may also refer to:

- George Ireland (businessman) (1801–1879), one of the founders of Ireland Fraser & Co. Ltd. of Mauritius
- George Ireland (English politician), member of parliament for Appleby and Great Bedwyn, UK
- George Ireland (New Zealand politician) (1829–1880), member of parliament from the Southland Region of New Zealand
