= John Ireland (philatelist) =

British philatelist

John Ireland (1882–1965) was a British philatelist who was added to the Roll of Distinguished Philatelists in 1956.
