= Andrew Ireland =

Andrew Ireland may refer to:

- Andrew Ireland (footballer) (born 1953), Australian rules footballer and administrator
- Andrew Ireland (politician) (born 1995), current member of the Indiana House of Representatives
- Andrew Ireland (rower) (born 1982), Canadian rower
- Andy Ireland (1930–2024), former member of the US House of Representatives
