= Betty de Courcy Ireland =

Irish campaigner, anti-war activist and socialist

- Born: Beatrice Haigh; 25 May 1911; Hitchin, Hertfordshire, England
- Died: 24 December 1999 (aged 88); Dublin, Ireland
- Known for: Anti-war activist

Betty de Courcy Ireland (25 May 1911 - 24 December 1999) was a socialist and anti-war activist, who was described by her husband, John de Courcy Ireland, as the "real inspiration" of all "the adventures, campaigns, and journeys" of his life.

== Biography ==
Betty de Courcy Ireland was born Beatrice Haigh in Hitchin, Hertfordshire, England on 25 May 1911. She was youngest of four daughters of an architect, Philip Haigh, and Victoria Alice Haigh (née Brunker), originally from Dublin. De Courcy Ireland attended Cheltenham College and later a school in Switzerland. She then went to a catering college, and helped her sister in operating a restaurant in Cornmarket Street, Oxford, known as "the Irish cafe" owing to its university and left leaning clientele. Here she met John de Courcy Ireland, who was attending Oxford, in the early 1930s. He had gone to the cafe to wash himself after canoeing on the canals from Oxford and the Thames to Bath and the Severn. They married in 1932.

Following her husband's graduation, the couple moved to Manchester, where he was a teacher in Bury from 1934 to 1937. While there they became involved in local organisations, including the Gaelic League and the China Relief Society. De Courcy Ireland had paramedical training from the St John Ambulance and the Red Cross, and in 1936 she volunteered as part of a medical team to go to Barcelona with the republican international brigades in the Spanish Civil War. At this time she delivered funds for medical aid for wounded combatants that had been collected by Manchester trade unionists. She was already known for her public speaking throughout the north of England, so upon her return her addressed a number of public meetings about the Spanish Civil War. She also stood for the Labour Party in the 1938 Manchester city council elections.

The couple moved to Ireland in 1938, when John was commissioned to write a book about the Northern Irish border (a commission that was cancelled after the outbreak of World War II). They initially lived on the Aran Islands to improve their Irish, and then moved to Muff, County Donegal. Due to John's activities with trade union opposition to British and American naval construction on Lough Foyle as a member of the Irish Local Security Force, he was dismissed and the couple moved to Dublin when he took up a position as a history teacher at the St Patrick's Cathedral Grammar School. Both of the De Courcy Irelands identified with the "libertarian socialism" politics of James Larkin and were ardent members of the Irish Labour Party. The family moved variously to Drogheda, Bandon, Dún Laoghaire and Blackrock following John's teaching positions. They had one son and two daughters, and eventually settled at a bungalow they called "Caprera", on Grosvenor Terrace, Sorrento Road, Dalkey.

The couple joined the Unitarian Church, St Stephen's Green, Dublin in 1953, and continued to be active supporters of the Red Cross. De Courcy Ireland ran in the 1955 Dún Laoghaire borough election unsuccessfully as a Labour candidate. She took part in the first two marches of the Campaign for Nuclear Disarmament (CND) at Aldermaston, Berkshire in 1958 to 1959, and founded the Irish branch of CND, serving as its secretary.

She died on 24 December 1999. The Irish CND erected a plaque to her in People's Park, Dún Laoghaire in 2002 in honour of her and John.
