= Buscadero =

Wordmark

Buscadero is a monthly music magazine published in Italy by Edizioni l'ultimo Buscadero Srl. It features classic rock and was founded in 1980 by Aldo Pedron, Paolo Carù and others after they split from the editorial staff of the magazine Il mucchio selvaggio. Aldo Pedron was the editor-in-chief of Buscadero from its founding until 1992. It is published in the Milanese city of Gallarate.

It is one of the oldest Italian music periodicals still being published, and has been called the principal source in Italy for aficionados of American music. The name is a tribute to the film of Sam Peckinpah, Junior Bonner, known in Italian as L'ultimo Buscadero. The first issue featured Bruce Springsteen. Among the writers who have appeared in the magazine over the years are Guido Chiesa, Cico Casartelli, Alfredo Marziano, Stefano Bianchi, Piero Tarantola, Marco Grompi, Adelmo Quadrio, Giancarlo Susanna, Raffaele Galli, and Davide Sapienza.

The term "buscadero" originally meant "one who searches" and was applied to lawmen, and then later to the outlaws for whom they searched. Hollywood took it one step further and applied the term to a gunbelt and holster rig. In Italy the term came to epitomize the cowboy culture of the American West, and thus the Peckinpah film was renamed L'ultimo Buscadero for its Italian release.
