= Robert Ireland =

Robert Ireland may refer to:

- Robert Ireland (died 1599) (c. 1532–1599), MP for Shrewsbury
- Robert Ireland (footballer, born 1900) (1900–?) for Liverpool F.C. and others
- Robert Ireland (Australian footballer) (born 1948), for Fitzroy
- Robert Livingston Ireland Jr. (1895–1981), American businessman
- Robert McGregor Innes Ireland (1930–1993), British military officer, engineer, and motor racing driver
- Robert E. Ireland (1929–2012), American chemist
- R. Duane Ireland, American academic
