= 204 (North Irish) Field Hospital =

204 (North Irish) General Hospital 204 (North Irish) Field Hospital
- Active: 1967 – 2023
- Country: United Kingdom
- Branch: British Army
- Role: Medical
- Size: Field Hospital; 202 personnel
- Part of: 2nd Medical Brigade
- Garrison/HQ: Belfast

204 (North Irish) Field Hospital was a unit of the Royal Army Medical Corps within the Army Reserve of the British Army.

== History ==
The hospital was formed upon the formation of the Territorial Army Volunteer Reserve (TAVR) in 1967, as the 204 (North Irish) General Hospital. Throughout the Cold War, the hospital was under the command of 107th (Ulster) Brigade; and on transfer to war, would re-subordinate to Commander Medical 1 (BR) Corps, and provide 800 beds. During the reforms implemented after the Cold War, the hospital was re-designated as 204 (North Irish) Field Hospital. As a result of Army 2020, the unit fell under 2nd Medical Brigade, and was paired with 34 Field Hospital.

Under the Future Soldier programme, the hospital amalgamated with 253rd (North Irish) Medical Regiment to form the new 210 (North Irish) Multi-Role Medical Regiment in September 2023. The new regiment falls under 2nd Medical Group.

== Current Structure ==
The hospital's structure at the time of amalgamation was as follows:

- Headquarters, at Belfast
- A Detachment, at Belfast
- B Detachment, at Lowfield Camp, Ballymena
- C Detachment, at Newtownards
- D Detachment, at Armagh
