= Anthony Ireland =

Anthony Ireland may refer to:

- Anthony Ireland (actor) (1902–1957), British actor
- Anthony Ireland (basketball) (born 1989), American basketball player
- Anthony Ireland (cricketer) (born 1984), cricketer from Zimbabwe
- Anthony Ireland (bishop) (born 1957), Australian Catholic prelate
