= David Ireland =

David Ireland may refer to:

- David Ireland (artist) (1930–2009), American conceptual and installation artist
- David Ireland (author) (1927–2022), Australian novelist
- David Ireland (colonel) (1832–1864), Union Army colonel in the American Civil War
- David Ireland (playwright) (born 1976), Northern Irish-born playwright and actor
