= Mardy S. Ireland =

American psychoanalyst

- Born: Merle Sanders Ireland; North Carolina, US

Academic background
- Education: Duke University, University of Hawaiʻi at Mānoa
- Thesis: A training paradigm for imagery awareness and the investigation of concomitant personality integration (1976)

Academic work
- Institutions: Psychoanalytic Institute of Northern California
- Main interests: Writer and psychoanalyst
- Notable works: Reconceiving Women: Separating Motherhood From Female Identity

Mardy Sanders Ireland is an American author and psychoanalyst, who practices in Raleigh, North Carolina. Previously, she practiced and taught in Berkeley, California.

== Biography ==
Born in North Carolina, Ireland is a founding member of the Lacanian School of Psychoanalysis, and was a member of the faculty at the Psychoanalytic Institute of Northern California.

In 1993, Ireland wrote "Reconceiving Women: Separating Motherhood From Female Identity", which focuses on three types of women: mothers, child-less, and child-free. Acknowledging the distinction child-free became critical as a legitimate choice for women. The work was the subsequent subject of a doctoral thesis. The New York Times reviewed this book. The "academic book" had struck a chord and found broad appeal.

In North Carolina, she became involved with and was interviewed about the Peaceful Schools Project regarding school bullying.

== Publications ==
- Ireland, Merle S. (1976). A training paradigm for imagery awareness and the investigation of concomitant personality integration (Ph.D. thesis). University of Hawaiʻi at Mānoa. OCLC 313434249.
- Ireland, Mardy S. (1993). Reconceiving women: separating motherhood from female identity. New York: Guilford Press. ISBN 9780898620160. OCLC 27225262.
- Ireland, Mardy S. (2003). The art of the subject: between necessary illusion and speakable desire in the analytic encounter. New York: Other Press. ISBN 9781590510339. OCLC 51810491.
- Ireland, Mardy S. (October 2004). "Phallus or penis: commentary on Cornelia St. John's paper". Studies in Gender and Sexuality. 5 (4): 459–472. doi:10.1080/15240650509349259. S2CID 143897213.
