= Peter Gonnella =

Australian cricketer (born 1963)

Personal information
- Born: 14 January 1963 (age 63); Canberra, Western Australia
- Source: Cricinfo, 6 November 2017

Peter Gonnella (born 14 January 1963) is an Australian cricketer. He played nineteen first-class matches for Western Australia between 1984/85 and 1988/89.

== See also ==
- List of Western Australia first-class cricketers
