= Robert Gartrell =

Australian cricketer (born 1946)

Personal information
- Full name: Robert Boyd Gartrell
- Born: 9 March 1962 (age 64); Middle Swan, Western Australia
- Batting: Left-handed
- Bowling: Right-arm off-break

Domestic team information
- Years: Team
- 1984/85–1985/86: Western Australia
- 1986/87: Tasmania

Career statistics
Competition	First-class	List A
Matches	10	3
Runs scored	484	15
Batting average	30.25	15.00
100s/50s	1/1	0/0
Top score	104	14*
Balls bowled	18	–
Wickets	0	–
Bowling average	–	–
5 wickets in innings	–	–
10 wickets in match	–	–
Best bowling	–	–
Catches/stumpings	3/–	2/–
- Source: CricketArchive, 18 August 2010

Robert Boyde Gartrell (born 9 March 1962), is a former Australian cricketer who played first-class cricket for Tasmania and Western Australia from 1984 to 1987. He also represented Western Australia in List A cricket on three occasions.

Gartrell was born in Middle Swan, Western Australia. A left-handed batsman, he scored one first-class century during his career.
