= 253 (North Irish) Medical Regiment =

253 (North Irish) Field Ambulance 253 (North Irish) Divisional GS Medical Regiment 253 (North Irish) Medical Regiment
- Active: 1967 – 2023
- Country: United Kingdom
- Branch: British Army
- Role: Medical
- Size: Regiment; 398 personnel
- Part of: 2nd Medical Brigade
- Garrison/HQ: Belfast

253 (North Irish) Medical Regiment was a regiment of the Royal Army Medical Corps within the Army Reserve of the British Army.

== History ==
The regiment was originally formed as the 253 (North Irish) Field Ambulance, upon the formation of the TAVR in 1967. In 2006, under the Delivering Security in a Changing World reforms, the field ambulance was re-designated as a medical regiment, becoming 253 (North Irish) Divisional General Support Medical Regiment. Under Army 2020, the regiment dropped the divisional title, to become 253 (North Irish) Medical Regiment, transferred to 2nd Medical Brigade, and was tasked to support 1st (United Kingdom) Division.

Under the Future Soldier programme, the hospital amalgamated with 204th (North Irish) Field Hospital to form the new 210th (North Irish) Multi-Role Medical Regiment in September 2023. The new regiment falls under 2nd Medical Group.

== Current Structure ==
The regiment's structure at the time of amalgamation was as follows:

- Headquarters Squadron, at Belfast
- 107 Medical Squadron, at Belfast
- 108 Medical Squadron, at Limavady and Enniskillen
- 109 Medical Squadron, at Belfast
- 110 Medical Squadron, at Belfast
- 64 Medical Squadron, at Chorley
