= Hannah Ireland =

New Zealand contemporary artist (born 1995)

- Born: 1995 (age 30–31); Auckland, New Zealand
- Education: University of Auckland
- Known for: painting

Hannah Ireland (born 1995) is a New Zealand contemporary artist who creates gestural and expressionist paintings. Her paintings have been exhibited throughout New Zealand, and she was featured in the triennial Aotearoa Contemporary Exhibition at the Auckland Art Gallery in 2024. Her works are in the Arts House Trust collection, The Dowse Art Museum collection, and the Auckland University collection.

== Background and education ==
Ireland is of Ngāti Hine and Ngāpuhi descent. She was born in Onehunga, and lives and works in Auckland.

In 2022, she graduated with a Bachelor of Arts (Psychology) and a Bachelor of Fine Arts (first class honours) from the University of Auckland.

== Career ==
=== Art ===
Ireland is primarily a portraitist. She often paints on glass, sometimes repurposing found or abandoned windows. Painting on glass allows her painting process to showcase potential abstraction, ambiguity, and spontaneity. By building up thick layers of paint to create three-dimensional figures, she creates blurring boundaries between representation and abstraction. She also paints on canvas, but draws on the technique she uses when painting on glass so that the paint and composition is still built up in her specific style. When working with canvas, she often cuts and stitches parts of the canvas to create patterns and indentations that influence the compositions.

She has taught this technique to classes before, having held an experimental painting workshop at the Gus Fisher Gallery, which oversaw the class using Perspex as the canvas to create self-portraits.

=== Awards ===
| Year | Award | Location |
|---|---|---|
| 2023 | National Contemporary art awards – Friends of Waikato Museum Merit award | New Zealand |
| 2021 | The Molly Morpeth Canaday Award Supreme Winner | New Zealand |

=== Selected Exhibitions ===
| Year | Title | Location | Solo or Group |
|---|---|---|---|
| 2024 | Aotearoa Contemporary | Auckland Art Gallery Toi o Tāmaki | Group |
| 2024 | Tossing and Turning | Aotearoa Art Fair, Auckland | Solo |
| 2024 | Nā Te Ārai, Ko Māhu | Tautai Gallery, Auckland | Group |
| 2023 | Strange Friends | The Dowse Art Museum, Lower Hutt | Group |
| 2023 | Waiting Room | Laree Payne Gallery, Hamilton | Solo |
| 2023 | Running with Scissors | Te Uru Waitakere Contemporary Gallery, Auckland | Solo |
| 2023 | Wet Stairs | Jhana Millers Gallery, Wellington | Solo |
| 2023 | Summer Selection | Jhana Millers Gallery, Wellington | Group |
| 2022 | It Feels So Good To Be Alive | Jhana Millers Gallery, Wellington | Solo |
| 2022 | I'm Just A Spectator | Laree Payne Gallery, Hamilton | Group |
| 2021 | A New Net | Tim Melville Gallery, Auckland | Group |
| 2021 | In Praise of Shadows | Ivan Anthony, Auckland | Group |
| 2021 | Hate to Rain on Your Parade | Sanc Gallery, Auckland | Solo |
| 2021 | Some New New Zealand Painting | Broker Galleries, Queenstown | Group |
| 2021 | Stuck in the Mud | Jhana Millers, Wellington | Solo |
| 2021 | The Kiingi Tūheitia Portraiture Award | New Zealand Portrait Gallery, Wellington | |
| 2021 | Molly Morpeth Canaday Award | Whakatāne Museum and Arts | |
| 2021 | He Taura Here | Laree Payne Gallery, Hamilton | Group |
| 2020 | Handshake in Hamilton | Weasel Gallery, Hamilton | Group |
| 2020 | Cheap Wine | Window Gallery, Auckland | Solo |
| 2020 | SAW_SEE-SEE_SAW | Sanc Gallery, Auckland | Group |
| 2019 | Martin was Always the Class Clown | Elam Galleries, Auckland | Solo |
