= Foreign relations of Ireland =

The foreign relations of Ireland are substantially influenced by its membership of the European Union, although bilateral relations with the United States and United Kingdom are also important. Ireland is one of the group of smaller nations in the EU and has traditionally followed a non-aligned foreign policy. Ireland has historically tended towards independence in foreign military policy, thus it is not a member of the North Atlantic Treaty Organisation and has a longstanding policy of military neutrality.

== Main relationships ==
Ireland was not invited to join the United Nations when it was formed in 1945. Both Washington and London were opposed because of Ireland's neutrality during the war. Ireland applied in 1946 and the US and UK voted approval, but the Soviet Union vetoed it. Ireland was finally admitted to the UN in 1955. It joined the European Economic Community (EEC) in 1973; it is now known as the European Union (EU). In 1974 it began the Irish Aid programme to provide assistance to developing countries. In 1991 it established the Irish Institute of International and European Affairs to conduct research and analysis on international and European affairs. In 1992 the Irish Refugee Council began as a humanitarian advocate for the rights of refugees and asylum seekers in Ireland.

=== United Kingdom ===
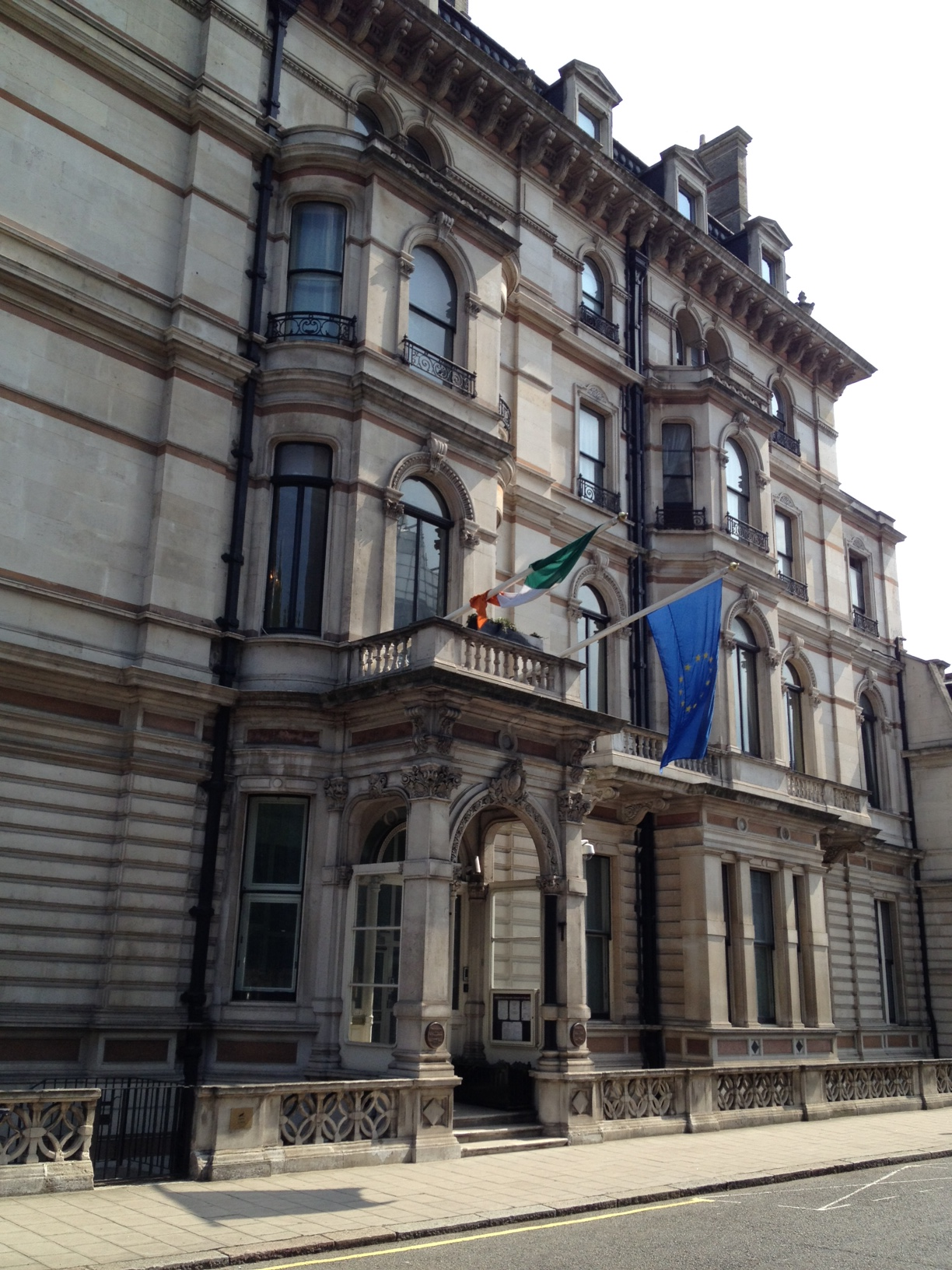
Embassy of Ireland in London

Since at least the 12th century Ireland, as a result of military conquest, has had political connections with the United Kingdom and its predecessor states, with the whole island becoming a part of the United Kingdom of Great Britain and Ireland from 1801 to 1922. From the time Ireland became independent from the United Kingdom in 1922, the two countries have been involved in a dispute over the status of Northern Ireland. Articles 2 and 3 of the Constitution of Ireland formerly claimed Northern Ireland as a part of the "national territory", though in practice the Irish government did recognise the UK's jurisdiction over the region.

From the onset of the Troubles in 1969, the two governments sought to bring the violence to an end. The Sunningdale Agreement of 1973 and the Anglo-Irish Agreement of 1985 were important steps in this process. In 1998, both states signed the Good Friday Agreement and now co-operate closely to find a solution to the region's problems. Articles 2 and 3 of the Constitution of Ireland were amended as part of this agreement, the territorial claim being replaced with a statement of aspiration to unite the people of the island of Ireland. As part of the Good Friday Agreement, the states also ended their dispute over their respective names: Ireland and the United Kingdom of Great Britain and Northern Ireland. Each agreed to accept and use the others' correct name.

When the Troubles were raging in Northern Ireland, the Irish Government sought, with mixed success, to prevent the import of weapons and ammunition through its territory by illegal paramilitary organisations for use in their conflict with the security forces in Northern Ireland. In 1973 three ships of the Irish Naval Service intercepted a ship carrying weapons from Libya which were probably destined for Irish Republican paramilitaries. Law enforcement acts such as these additionally improved relations with the government of the United Kingdom. However, the independent judiciary blocked a number of attempts to extradite suspects between 1970 and 1998 on the basis that their crime might have been 'political' and thus contrary to international law at the time.

Ireland is one of the parties to the Rockall continental shelf dispute that also involves Denmark, Iceland, and the United Kingdom. Ireland and the United Kingdom have signed a boundary agreement in the Rockall area. However, neither has concluded similar agreements with Iceland or Denmark (on behalf of the Faroe Islands) and the matter remains under negotiation. Iceland now claims a substantial area of the continental shelf to the west of Ireland, to a point 49°48'N 19°00'W, which is further south than Ireland.

The controversial Sellafield nuclear fuel reprocessing plant in north-western England has also been a contentious issue between the two governments. The Irish government has sought the closure of the plant, taking a case against the UK government under the United Nations Convention on the Law of the Sea. However, the European Court of Justice found that the case should have been dealt with under EU law. In 2006, however, both countries came to a friendly agreement which enabled both the Radiological Protection Institute of Ireland and the Garda Síochána (Irish Police Force) access to the site to conduct investigations.

==== Countries of the United Kingdom ====
===== Scotland =====
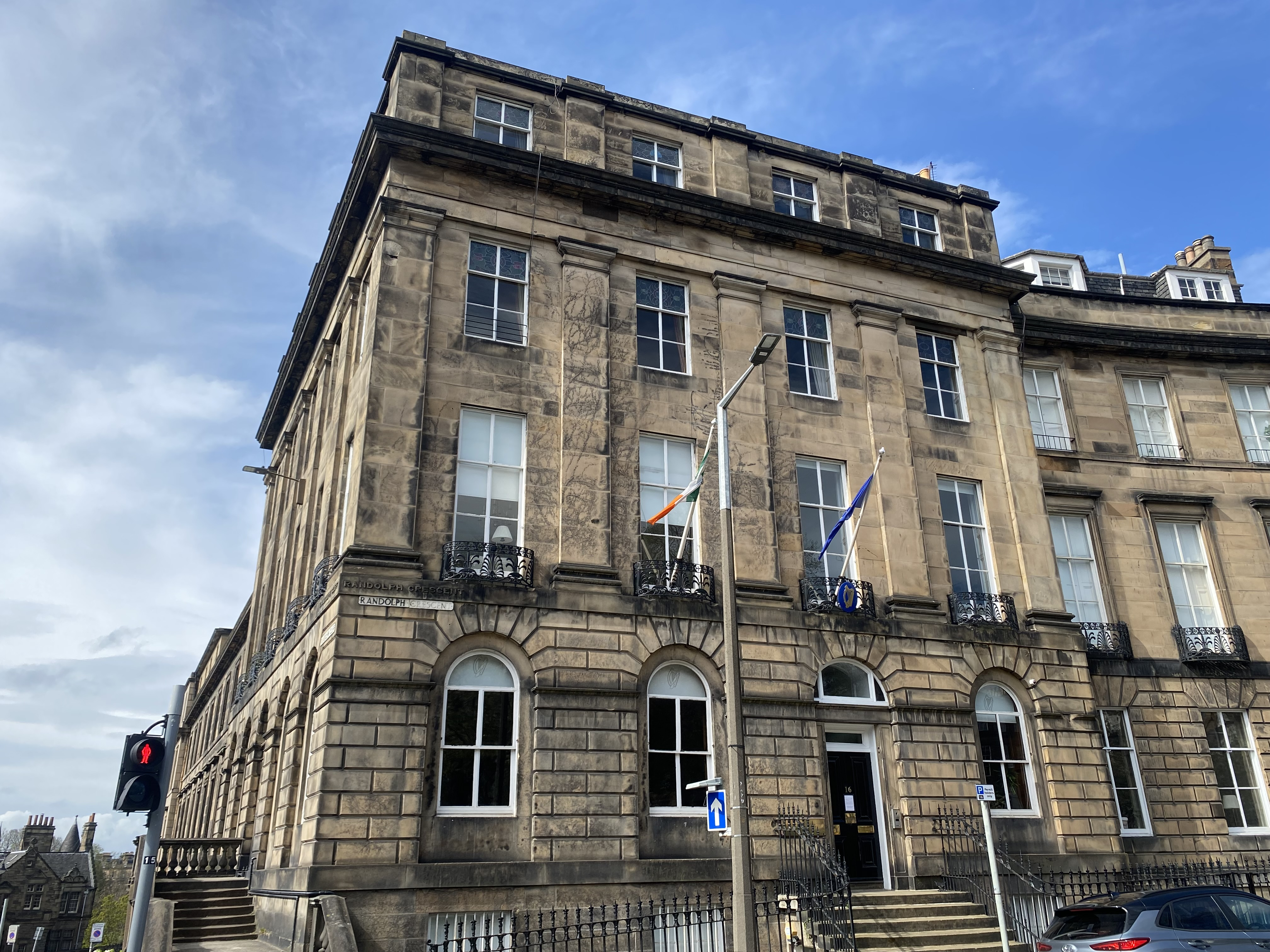
Consulate General of Ireland in Edinburgh

Scottish First Minister John Swinney meets with Irish President Catherine Connolly, September 2026

Relations between Ireland and Scotland are supported by geographical proximity across the Irish Sea, longstanding cultural and historical connections, trade and cooperation in areas of shared policy interest. Both governments participate in the British–Irish Council, which provides a formal mechanism for consultation on matters affecting their respective communities. Economic relations include trade in goods and services, tourism, investment and connections between businesses and educational institutions. The Irish government identifies the wider relationship between Ireland and the United Kingdom as an important economic partnership, while also maintaining engagement with Scotland through bilateral contacts and the British–Irish Council.

Cooperation also takes place in areas including renewable energy, transport, higher education, research and cultural exchange. The governments have shared interests in the development of renewable energy resources and in the economic and environmental implications of energy infrastructure around the Irish Sea. Scotland's devolved status shapes the relationship. The Scottish Government can pursue international engagement within its devolved responsibilities, including trade promotion, cultural diplomacy and educational partnerships, while formal foreign policy remains a matter for the UK Government. Relations with Ireland therefore combine direct contact between the two administrations with wider UK–Irish diplomatic relations.

Relations between Ireland and Scotland have been maintained through regular meetings between the Taoiseach, the President of Ireland, Irish government ministers and Scotland's First Minister and cabinet secretaries. In November 2025, John Swinney, the First Minister of Scotland, visited Dublin, where he met representatives of the Irish government and launched the Ireland–Scotland Bilateral Cooperation Framework 2030 with Neale Richmond, Ireland's Minister of State for International Development and Diaspora. The visit reaffirmed both governments' intention to strengthen bilateral relations and establish priorities for cooperation through the end of the decade. In September 2026, Catherine Connolly, President of Ireland, undertook a four-day official visit to Scotland. The visit began with a meeting with First Minister John Swinney and Stephen Gethins, the Scottish Minister for Europe, External Relations and Energy, at Bute House in Edinburgh.

===== Northern Ireland =====
Relations between the Republic of Ireland and Northern Ireland are distinct from those with Scotland and Wales because they involve cross-border cooperation on the same island and are directly connected to the constitutional arrangements established by the Good Friday Agreement. The 1998 agreement established a framework for relations between the Irish and British governments, institutions within Northern Ireland and cooperation between Northern Ireland and Ireland. It recognised the principle of consent concerning Northern Ireland's constitutional status and provided for institutional cooperation on matters of mutual interest.

===== Wales =====
Relations between Ireland and Wales are characterised by geographical proximity, historical connections, cultural exchange and participation in common intergovernmental institutions. Both administrations are members of the British–Irish Council, through which they can discuss shared policy challenges and cooperate in areas of mutual interest. Economic links include trade, tourism, business cooperation and connections between communities on both sides of the Irish Sea. The Welsh Government's international engagement includes promoting Wales as a place to trade, invest, study and visit. Cooperation with Ireland can consequently take place directly on matters within devolved competence, while wider diplomatic and treaty matters remain the responsibility of the UK Government. Both Ireland and Wales support the use and development of their respective national languages, Irish and Welsh, although their legal and institutional arrangements differ. The British–Irish Council's work on indigenous, minority and lesser-used languages provides a forum for exchanging experience and discussing language promotion.

=== United States ===
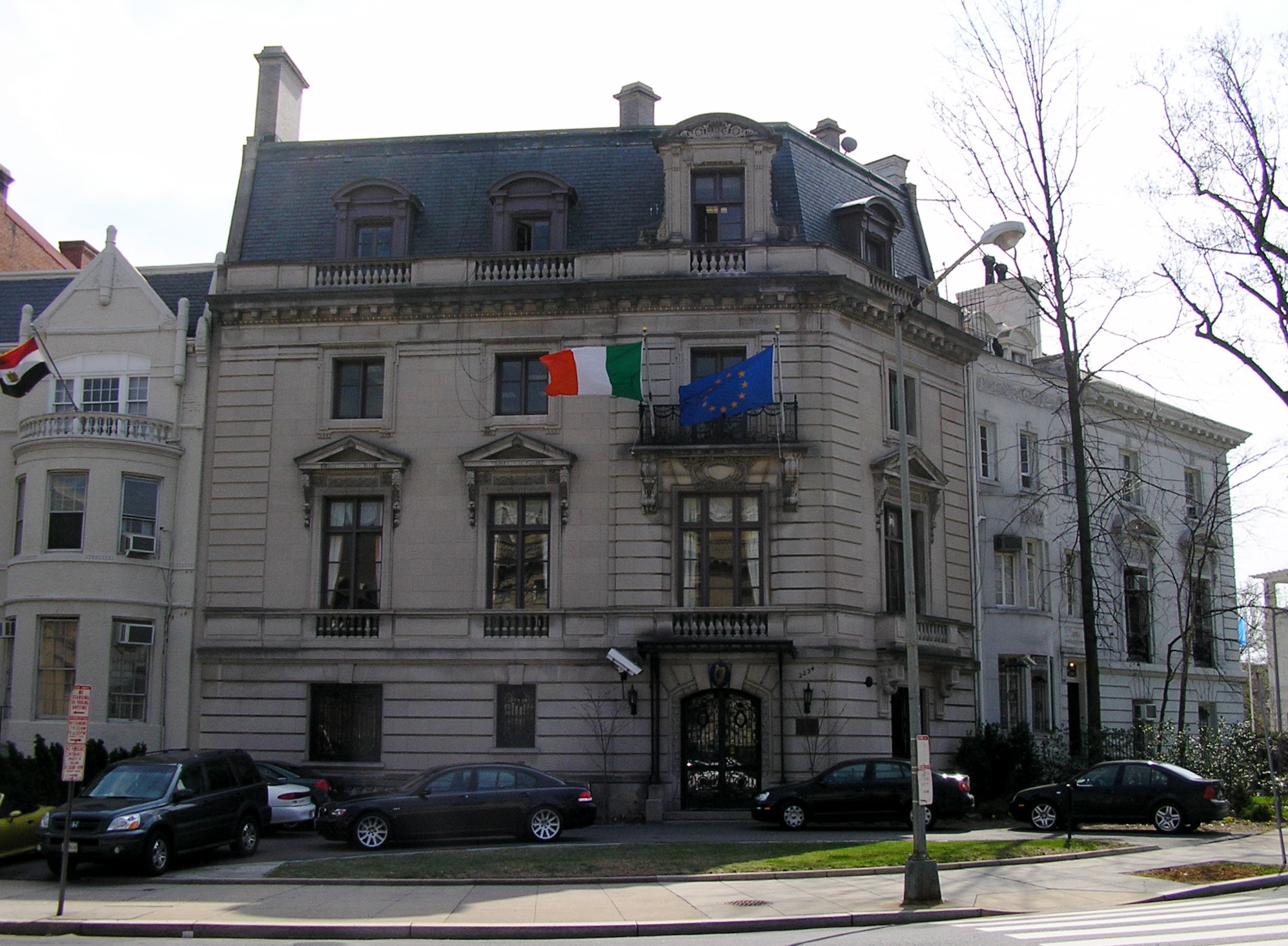
Embassy of Ireland to the US, in Washington, D.C.

The United States recognised the Irish Free State on 28 June 1924 with diplomatic relations being established on 7 October 1924. In 1927, the United States opened an American Legation in Dublin. Due to the ancestral ties between the two countries, Ireland and the US have a strong relationship, both politically and economically, with the US being Ireland's biggest trading partner since 2000. Ireland also receives more foreign direct investment from the US than many larger nations, with investments in Ireland equal to France and Germany combined and, in 2012, more than all of developing Asia put together.

The use of Shannon Airport as a stop-over point for US forces en route to Iraq has caused domestic controversy in Ireland. Opponents of this policy brought an unsuccessful High Court case against the government in 2003, arguing that this use of Irish airspace violated Irish neutrality. Restrictions such as carrying no arms, ammunition, or explosives, and that the flights in question did not form part of military exercises or operations were put in place to defend Irish neutrality, however, allegations have been made against the Central Intelligence Agency that the airport has been used between 30 and 50 times for illegal extraordinary rendition flights to the U.S. without the knowledge of the Irish Government, despite diplomatic assurances by the US that Irish airspace would not be used for transport of detainees.

In July 2006, the former Irish Minister for Foreign Affairs, Dermot Ahern voiced concern over the 2006 Lebanon War. A shipment of bombs being sent to Israel by the United States was banned using Irish airspace or airfields.

In 1995 a decision was made by the U.S. government to appoint a Special Envoy to Northern Ireland to help with the Northern Ireland peace process. During the 2008 presidential campaign in the United States, however, Democratic Party candidate Barack Obama was reported as having questioned the necessity to keep a US Special Envoy for Northern Ireland. His remarks caused an uproar within the Republican Party, with Senator John McCain questioning his leadership abilities and his commitment to the ongoing peace process in Northern Ireland.

As of 2023, Geraldine Byrne Nason is the Irish ambassador to the United States while the position of U.S. ambassador to Ireland is held by Edward Sharp Walsh.

=== China ===
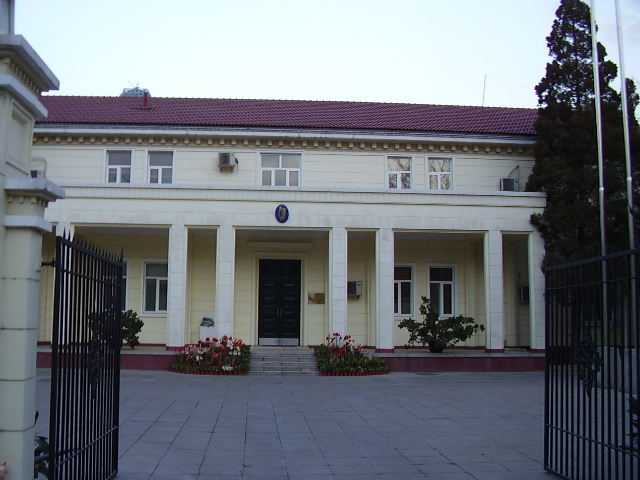
Embassy of Ireland in Beijing

Ireland's official relationship with the People's Republic of China began on 22 June 1979. Following his visit to China in 1999, former Taoiseach Bertie Ahern authorised the establishment of an Asia Strategy. This Strategy aimed to ensure that the Irish Government and Irish enterprise work coherently to enhance the important relationships between Ireland and Asia. In recent years due to the rapid expansion of the Chinese economy, China is becoming a key trade partner of Ireland, with over $6bn worth of bilateral trade between the two countries in 2010. In July 2013, the Tánaiste and Minister for Foreign Affairs and Trade were invited to China by the Chinese foreign minister Wang Yi on a trade mission to boost both investment and political ties between the two countries.

Ireland has raised its concerns in the area of human rights with China on several occasions. On 12 May 2007, during a visit to Beijing, former Taoiseach Brian Cowen (then Minister for Finance) discussed human rights issues with Chinese Foreign Minister Li Zhaoxing. Former Tánaiste Mary Coughlan also raised human rights issues and concerns with visiting Chinese Vice-Premier Zeng Peiyan. Ireland also participates in the EU-China Human Rights Dialogue.

Concerning the Taiwan issue, Ireland follows a One-China policy and emphasizes the Taiwan issue being best settled through dialogue "between the parties concerned". Ireland does not maintain official diplomatic ties with Taiwan although there is a Taipei Representative Office that has a representative function about economic and cultural promotion.

In July 2019, the UN ambassadors from 22 nations, including Ireland, signed a joint letter to the UNHRC condemning China's mistreatment of the Uyghurs as well as its mistreatment of other minority groups, urging the Chinese government to close the Xinjiang re-education camps.

== Diplomatic relations ==
List of countries which Ireland maintains diplomatic relations with:

#	Country	Date
1	United Kingdom	6 December 1922
2	United States	7 October 1924
3	France	19 October 1929
—	Holy See	27 November 1929
4	Belgium	7 September 1932
5	Spain	23 June 1935
6	Italy	1 April 1937
7	Canada	11 September 1939
8	Switzerland	16 October 1939
9	Portugal	26 February 1942
11	Sweden	28 June 1946
12	Australia	15 October 1946
10	Netherlands	28 December 1946
13	Czech Republic	29 January 1947
14	Argentina	29 July 1947
15	Iceland	11 March 1948
16	India	10 January 1949
17	Norway	17 February 1950
18	Turkey	15 March 1951
19	Austria	18 May 1951
20	Germany	26 July 1951
21	Japan	5 March 1957
22	Nigeria	14 November 1960
23	Luxembourg	20 December 1961
24	Denmark	January 1962
25	Finland	6 February 1962
26	Pakistan	1962
27	Iraq	15 January 1964
28	New Zealand	19 January 1966
29	Bangladesh	1972
30	Russia	29 September 1973
31	Bahrain	18 May 1974
32	Malaysia	12 September 1974
33	Qatar	September 1974
34	Saudi Arabia	September 1974
35	Kuwait	5 October 1974
36	United Arab Emirates	8 October 1974
37	Singapore	2 December 1974
38	Egypt	12 December 1974
39	Israel	12 December 1974
40	Lebanon	12 December 1974
41	Tunisia	16 January 1975
42	Greece	22 January 1975
43	Thailand	27 January 1975
44	Algeria	January 1975
45	Morocco	19 March 1975
46	Syria	18 July 1975
47	Mexico	21 August 1975
48	Brazil	1 September 1975
49	Iran	17 February 1976
50	Poland	30 September 1976
51	Hungary	1 October 1976
52	Serbia	April 1977
53	Libya	2 July 1977
54	Kenya	4 April 1979
55	China	22 June 1979
56	Tanzania	3 December 1979
57	Zambia	29 February 1980
58	Venezuela	26 September 1980
59	South Korea	4 October 1983
60	Zimbabwe	October 1983
61	Sudan	28 March 1984
62	Jordan	15 May 1984
63	Philippines	5 July 1984
64	Indonesia	4 September 1984
65	Cyprus	23 November 1984
66	Brunei	6 May 1986
67	Oman	8 July 1987
68	Romania	18 April 1990
69	Bulgaria	11 June 1990
70	Malta	13 June 1990
71	Ghana	1990
72	Lithuania	2 September 1991
73	Estonia	10 September 1991
74	Latvia	9 October 1991
75	Belarus	27 March 1992
76	Ukraine	1 April 1992
77	Kazakhstan	10 April 1992
78	Chile	1 June 1992
79	Slovakia	1 January 1993
80	Liechtenstein	13 January 1993
81	South Africa	5 October 1993
82	Uganda	14 July 1994
83	Ethiopia	18 July 1994
84	North Macedonia	13 December 1994
85	Namibia	1994
86	San Marino	13 January 1995
87	Andorra	18 January 1995
88	Croatia	27 January 1995
89	Albania	January 1995
90	Bosnia and Herzegovina	27 September 1995
91	Slovenia	25 January 1996
92	Uruguay	16 February 1996
93	Sri Lanka	February 1996
94	Vietnam	5 April 1996
95	Mozambique	13 June 1996
96	Armenia	28 June 1996
97	Azerbaijan	1 July 1996
98	Georgia	12 September 1996
99	Botswana	1996
100	Rwanda	April 1997
101	Uzbekistan	7 November 1997
102	Jamaica	7 December 1997
103	Laos	7 August 1998
104	Mongolia	22 December 1998
105	Peru	27 June 1999
106	Nepal	19 August 1999
107	Bolivia	30 September 1999
108	Moldova	30 September 1999
109	Seychelles	9 October 1999
110	Ecuador	20 October 1999
111	Cuba	27 October 1999
112	Cambodia	30 October 1999
113	Colombia	10 November 1999
114	Maldives	7 December 1999
115	Honduras	11 December 1999
116	Sierra Leone	19 January 2000
117	Guyana	2 February 2000
118	Nauru	21 March 2000
119	Ivory Coast	3 May 2000
120	Antigua and Barbuda	19 May 2000
121	Kyrgyzstan	23 June 2000
122	Samoa	26 June 2000
123	Chad	30 June 2000
124	El Salvador	13 July 2000
125	Palau	14 July 2000
126	Tajikistan	18 July 2000
127	Belize	21 July 2000
128	Yemen	25 July 2000
129	Mauritius	August 2000
130	Costa Rica	15 September 2000
131	Kiribati	7 September 2000
132	Tuvalu	7 September 2000
133	Vanuatu	7 September 2000
134	Trinidad and Tobago	13 December 2000
135	Democratic Republic of the Congo	2000
136	Saint Lucia	2000
137	Angola	24 January 2001
138	Panama	14 February 2001
139	Barbados	3 May 2001
140	Paraguay	15 May 2001
141	Gambia	29 May 2001
142	Djibouti	6 July 2001
143	Dominica	6 July 2001
144	Fiji	19 February 2002
145	Eritrea	13 March 2002
146	Afghanistan	19 September 2002
147	Malawi	2002
148	Timor-Leste	31 January 2003
149	Nicaragua	9 September 2003
150	North Korea	10 December 2003
151	Myanmar	10 February 2004
152	Burundi	April 2004
153	Federated States of Micronesia	27 October 2004
154	Guatemala	2004
155	Liberia	2004
156	Lesotho	14 June 2005
157	Montenegro	20 June 2006
158	Monaco	14 December 2006
159	Bahamas	23 April 2007
160	Cameroon	23 April 2007
161	Burkina Faso	1 May 2007
162	Turkmenistan	16 October 2007
163	Guinea	30 June 2008
—	Kosovo	11 November 2008
164	Dominican Republic	6 July 2009
165	Solomon Islands	4 December 2009
166	Gabon	15 December 2009
167	Haiti	26 January 2012
168	South Sudan	4 May 2012
169	Saint Vincent and the Grenadines	10 December 2013
170	Senegal	15 April 2014
171	Somalia	1 August 2017
172	Comoros	2017
173	Central African Republic	26 June 2018
174	Togo	27 June 2018
175	Benin	28 May 2019
176	Eswatini	8 August 2019
177	Marshall Islands	27 September 2019
178	Suriname	19 November 2019
179	Papua New Guinea	26 October 2020
180	Cape Verde	19 March 2021
181	Tonga	27 July 2021
182	Guinea-Bissau	25 November 2021
—	Cook Islands	21 November 2022
183	Mauritania	1 December 2022
184	Saint Kitts and Nevis	16 June 2023
185	Grenada	21 September 2023
186	Madagascar	6 March 2024
—	State of Palestine	29 September 2024
187	Niger	Unknown
188	Republic of the Congo	Unknown

== Bilateral relations ==
=== Africa ===
Country	Formal relations began	Notes
Algeria	January 1975	Ireland is represented in Algeria through its embassy in Bern (Switzerland).; Algeria has an embassy in Dublin.; There are 1,047 Algerians living in Ireland.
Angola	24 January 2001	Ireland is represented in Angola through its embassy in Maputo (Mozambique).; Angola is represented in Ireland through its embassy in London (United Kingdom).; Between 2006 and 2010 Angola received almost €7.6 million from the government of Ireland through Irish Aid.
Burkina Faso	1 May 2007	Although diplomatic relations with Burkina Faso are maintained through Ireland's Permanent Mission to the United Nations in New York (United States), Ireland is represented in Burkina Faso consularly through its embassy in Abuja (Nigeria).
Cameroon	23 April 2007	Ireland is represented in Cameroon through its embassy in Abuja (Nigeria).; Cameroon is represented in Ireland through an honorary consulate in Dublin.
Democratic Republic of Congo	2000	Ireland is represented in the Democratic Republic of Congo through its embassy in Pretoria (South Africa).; Democratic Republic of Congo received €7.4 million in aid from Ireland in 2011.; There are 1,770 citizens from between both the Republic of the Congo and the Democratic Republic of Congo living in Ireland. The exact number from each is uncertain due to the fact Congo with no distinction was used solely in census reports.
Egypt	December 1974	Ireland has an embassy in Cairo and an honorary consulate in Alexandria.; Egypt has an embassy in Dublin, the first embassy of an Arab country in Ireland.; There are 1,055 Egyptians living in Ireland.
Ethiopia	1994	See Ethiopia–Ireland relations: Ireland has an embassy in Addis Ababa.; Ethiopia closed its embassy in Dublin in 2021.; In 2011, Ethiopia received €36.4 million in aid from Ireland.; In November 2014 the President of Ireland Michael D. Higgins visited Ethiopia on a state visit to celebrate 20 years of diplomatic relations between the two countries. During this visit a bilateral transport agreement was signed which paved the way for Ethiopian Airlines to commence direct flights to Dublin from Addis Ababa, the first between Ireland and Sub-Saharan Africa.
Ghana	1990	Ireland is represented in Ghana through its embassy in Abuja (Nigeria). Ireland also maintains a visa applications centre in Accra.; Ghana is represented in Ireland through its embassy in London (United Kingdom).; There are 1,158 Ghanaians living in Ireland.
Ivory Coast	3 May 2000	Although diplomatic relations with the Ivory Coast are maintained through Ireland's Embassy in London (United Kingdom), Ireland is represented in the Ivory Coast consular through its embassy in Monrovia (Liberia).; Ivory Coast is represented in Ireland through its embassy in London (United Kingdom).
Kenya	4 April 1979	Ireland has an embassy in Nairobi.; Kenya has an embassy in Dublin.; Kenya received €9.3 million in aid from Ireland in 2011.; There are approximately 2,000 Irish citizens living in Kenya.
Lesotho		Ireland is represented in Lesotho through its embassy in Pretoria, South Africa after closing its embassy in Maseru in 2014.; Lesotho has an embassy in Dublin.; In June 2006 the President of Ireland, Mary McAleese made a state visit to the country.; Lesotho received €11.3 million in aid from Ireland in 2011.
Liberia	2004	Ireland has an embassy in Monrovia.; Liberia is represented in Ireland through its embassy in London (United Kingdom).; Liberia received €7.5 million in aid from Ireland in 2011.; Between 2003 and 2007, as part of the United Nations Mission in Liberia, Ireland deployed a quick reaction force of 430 troops to assist with peacekeeping.
Libya	2 July 1977	Both countries established diplomatic relations on 2 July 1977: Ireland is represented in Libya through its embassy in Rome (Italy).; Libya is represented in Ireland through its embassy in London (United Kingdom).; Under Muammar Gaddafi, the prime governor of Libya from 1969 to 2011, relations between both countries were strained due to Gaddafi's support of the Irish Republican Army. Gaddafi was sympathetic to their cause and also wanted revenge for the United States Air Force's bombing attacks on Tripoli and Benghazi in 1986. Between 1984 and 1987 Libya sent the IRA about 1,000 AK47 assault rifles and six tonnes of Semtex explosive alongside other weapons. This shipment ensured The Troubles could continue for many more years, mainly until the Good Friday Agreement of 1998 ended the conflict.
Madagascar	6 March 2024	Ireland is represented in Madagascar through its embassy in Maputo (Mozambique).; Madagascar is represented in Ireland through its embassy in London (United Kingdom).
Malawi	2002	Ireland has an embassy in Lilongwe and an honorary consulate in Blantyre.; Malawi has an honorary consulate in Dublin.; Malawi received €17.5 million in aid from Ireland in 2011.; In 2014 the President of Ireland, Michael D. Higgins, made a state visit to Malawi.
Mauritius	August 2000	Ireland is represented in Mauritius through its embassy in Pretoria (South Africa).; Mauritius is represented in Ireland through its high commission in London (United Kingdom).; There are 2,844 citizens of Mauritius living in Ireland.; Following the murder of Irish tourist Michaela McAreavey on the island in January 2011, several Irish businesses proposed a boycott of the island due to the questionable trial in which all 3 suspects were acquitted. Another source of discontent was the investigation by the Mauritian authorities. The Major Crime Investigation Team (MCIT), who was in charge, admitted they failed to interview fellow guests at the hotel who were staying close to the room in which the murder occurred. They also failed to preserve the crime scene and did not provide any solid DNA evidence against the accused. As a result, the Irish ambassador to Mauritius conveyed in person to the Prime Minister of Mauritius, Navin Ramgoolam, a formal government to government protest over what happened.
Morocco	19 March 1975	Ireland has an embassy in Rabat.; Morocco has an embassy in Dublin.; In November 2012 Morocco recalled its ambassador to Ireland temporarily due to the fact the leader of the Sahrawi Arab Democratic Republic, Mohamed Abdelaziz, met with top Irish officials, including the President of Ireland Michael D. Higgins and the Minister for Foreign Affairs, Eamon Gilmore. The Sahrawi Arab Democratic Republic claims sovereignty over Western Sahara, a disputed territory that Morocco also claims to own.
Mozambique	13 June 1996	Ireland has an embassy in Maputo.; Mozambique is represented in Ireland through its embassy in London (United Kingdom).; Mozambique received €42.2 million in aid from Ireland in 2011.
Namibia	1994	Ireland is represented in Namibia through its embassy in Pretoria (South Africa).; Namibia is represented in Ireland through its embassy in London (United Kingdom).; Following Namibia's Independence from South Africa in 1990, Ireland sent 50 Garda officers as well as 20 military observers to the country as part of the United Nations Transition Assistance Group. This group was sent to monitor the peace process and elections taking place there at the time.
Nigeria		Ireland is represented in Nigeria through its embassy in Abuja, Ireland's first on the African continent, and an honorary consulate in Lagos.; Nigeria is represented in Ireland through its embassy in Dublin.; There are 17,642 Nigerians living in Ireland.
Seychelles	9 October 1999	Although diplomatic relations with Seychelles are maintained through Ireland's Permanent Mission to the United Nations in New York (United States), Ireland is represented in Seychelles consular through its embassy in Dar es Salaam (Tanzania).; Seychelles have an honorary consulate in Dublin.
Sierra Leone	19 January 2000	Ireland has an embassy in Freetown since 2014.; Sierra Leone is represented in Ireland through its embassy in London (United Kingdom) and an honorary consulate in Muine Bheag in County Carlow.; Sierra Leone received €9.1 million in aid from Ireland in 2011.; Between 2005 and 2014 Ireland provided over €88 million in assistance to projects in Sierra Leone.
Somalia		Ireland maintains diplomatic relations with the Federal Government of Somalia through its embassy in Nairobi (Kenya).; In 1993 as part of the United Nations led Operation in Somalia II peace-enforcing mission, 100 Irish troops forming a transport company were deployed to Somalia.; There are 1,047 Somalis living in Ireland.
South Africa	1993	Ireland opened an embassy in Pretoria in 1994. Ireland also has an honorary consulate in Cape Town.; The South African Embassy in Dublin was opened in 1995.; There are 4,872 South Africans living in Ireland.; Ireland gave just over €6.1 million in aid to South Africa in 2011.; South African Department of Foreign Affairs about relations with Ireland; A principled stand against apartheid by Ireland came to prevent the establishment of diplomatic relations between the two countries. As a result, Ireland was the only EU country that did not have full diplomatic relations with South Africa until 1993, when an exchange of ambassadors was agreed with the De Klerk administration in anticipation of the ending of apartheid.
Tanzania	1979	Ireland has an embassy in Dar es Salaam.; Tanzania is represented in Ireland through its high commission in London (United Kingdom).; Tanzania received €35.4 million in aid from Ireland in 2011.
Uganda	1994	Ireland has an embassy in Kampala.; Uganda is represented in Ireland through its high commission in London (United Kingdom) and an honorary consulate in Dublin.; In 2011 Uganda received €42.7 million from Ireland through a variety of aid programmes.; Irish people are one of the few citizens that do not need a visa to travel to Uganda.; It was found in November 2012 that €4 million worth of Irish foreign aid was misappropriated by senior officials of the country. Instead of going towards aiding the development of the country, this money was redirected into the personal account of the prime minister of Uganda. The Irish government then halted all aid payments towards Uganda until the money was recouped, which eventually occurred in January 2013.
Zimbabwe	1984	Ireland is represented in Zimbabwe through an honorary consulate in Harare.; Zimbabwe is represented in Ireland through its embassy in London (United Kingdom).; Zimbabwe received €7.6 million in aid from Ireland in 2011.; There are 1,537 Zimbabweans living in Ireland.

=== Americas ===
Country	Formal relations began	Notes
Argentina	21 July 1947	See Argentina-Ireland relations: Ireland has an embassy in Buenos Aires.; Argentina has an embassy in Dublin.; The founder of the Argentinean Navy and greatest naval hero was Irish seaman William Brown.; In 2012 the Irish president Michael D. Higgins became the third Irish President in succession to visit Argentina on a state visit.; In March 2008, a new visa programme between the two countries allowing young people from each country to work in the other for up to 9 months was announced.; See Also: Irish Argentine
Bahamas	23 April 2007	Ireland is represented in The Bahamas through its embassy in Ottawa (Canada) and an honorary consulate in Nassau.; The Bahamas are represented in Ireland through their High Commission in London (United Kingdom).
Brazil	19 September 1975	See Brazil–Ireland relations: Ireland has an embassy in Brasília and consulate general in São Paulo.; Brazil has an embassy in Dublin and an honorary consulate in Cork.; There are 8,704 Brazilians living in Ireland.; Ireland is the fourth most popular country in the world for Brazilian students studying abroad.; See also: Irish Brazilian
Canada	11 September 1939	See Canada–Ireland relations: Ireland has an embassy in Ottawa and consulates-general in Toronto and Vancouver.; Canada has an embassy in Dublin.; There are 2,384 Canadian citizens residing in Ireland.; Canada and Ireland enjoy friendly relations, the importance of these relations centres on the history of Irish migration to Canada. Approximately 4 million Canadians have Irish ancestors, or approximately 14% of Canada's population.
Chile	1 June 1992	See also: Chile–Ireland relations: Chile has an embassy in Dublin.; Ireland has an embassy in Santiago.; A special visa programme allowing young people from both countries to work in the other country for up to a year was announced in 2016.; See also: Irish Chilean
Colombia	10 November 1999	See Colombia–Ireland relations: Ireland has an embassy in Bogotá.; Colombia has an embassy in Dublin.; Colombia received over €1 million in aid from Ireland in 2011.
Costa Rica	15 September 2000	Ireland is accredited to Costa Rica through its embassy in Mexico City, Mexico and an honorary consulate in San José; Costa Rica is represented in Ireland through its embassy in London (United Kingdom).; In 2013 the President of Ireland, Michael D. Higgins made a state visit to Costa Rica.
Cuba	27 October 1999	Ireland has an honorary consulate in Havana.; Cuba has an embassy in Dublin.; A large number of Irish people migrated to Cuba in the 19th century.; The Irish Republican political party, Sinn Féin is also known to have close political links to the Cuban government. In 2015 Sinn Féin party leader, Gerry Adams made an official visit to the country.
Dominican Republic	13 July 2000	Ireland is represented in the Dominican Republic through its embassy in Bogotá, Colombia; The Dominican Republic is represented in Ireland through its embassy in London, United Kingdom.
Ecuador	20 October 1999	Ireland is represented in Ecuador through its embassy in Santiago (Chile) and an honorary consulate in Quito.; Ecuador is represented in Ireland through its embassy in London (United Kingdom) and has an honorary consulate in Dublin.
Haiti	26 January 2012	Ireland is represented in Haiti through Ireland's embassy in Mexico City (Mexico).; In 2014 Haiti received €2.1m from Ireland in development aid.; Following the devastating 2010 Haiti earthquake, Ireland donated €37.3m to the country in response through governmental bodies such as Irish Aid and through donations to NGO'S from the public.
Jamaica	7 December 1997	Ireland is represented in Jamaica through its embassy in Ottawa (Canada).; Jamaica is represented in Ireland through an honorary consulate in Dublin.; See also: Irish people in Jamaica
Mexico	10 January 1974	See Ireland–Mexico relations: Ireland has an embassy in Mexico City and an honorary consulate in Cancún; Mexico has an embassy in Dublin and four honorary consulates (Dublin, Cork, Limerick and Galway).; Many Mexicans have Irish ancestors due to the Irish migration to Mexico.; In 2013 the President of Ireland, Michael D. Higgins visited Mexico on an official state visit.
Panama	14 February 2001	Although diplomatic relations with Panama are maintained through Ireland's embassy in Bogotá (Colombia), Ireland is represented in Panama consularly through its embassy in Mexico City (Mexico) and through an honorary consulate in Panama City.
Peru	27 June 1999	Main article: Ireland–Peru relations: Ireland is accredited to Peru from its embassy in Santiago, Chile and maintains an honorary consulate in Lima.; Peru has an embassy in Dublin.
United States	7 October 1924	See above and Ireland–United States relations: Ireland has an embassy in Washington, D.C. and consulate generals in Atlanta, Austin, Boston, Chicago, Los Angeles, Miami, New York and San Francisco and honorary consulates in Denver, Orlando, Honolulu, New Orleans, St. Louis, Las Vegas, Charlotte, Pittsburgh, Houston and Seattle. Ireland also maintains a permanent mission to the United Nations in New York.; The United States is represented in Ireland through its embassy in Dublin.; There are 153,248 Irish citizens residing in the United States.; There are 11,015 US citizens living in Ireland.; 39.6 million US citizens claim Irish heritage, including 5 million who say they are of Scots-Irish heritage.

=== Asia ===
No formal diplomatic relations

Country	Formal relations began	Notes
Afghanistan	19 September 2002	Ireland is represented in Afghanistan through its embassy in Abu Dhabi (United Arab Emirates).; Ireland gave €6.5 million in aid to Afghanistan in 2011.
Armenia	28 June 1996	Ireland recognised Armenia's independence in December 1991.; Armenia is represented in Ireland through its embassy in London (United Kingdom) and an honorary consulate in Dublin.; Ireland is represented in Armenia through its embassy in Sofia (Bulgaria) and through an honorary consulate in Yerevan.; Both countries are full members of the Council of Europe.
Azerbaijan	1 July 1996	Ireland is represented in Azerbaijan through its embassy in Ankara (Turkey).; Azerbaijan is represented in Ireland through its embassy in London (United Kingdom).
Bahrain	18 May 1974	Ireland is represented in Bahrain through its embassy in Riyadh (Saudi Arabia) and an honorary consulate in Manama.; Bahrain is represented in Ireland through its embassy in London (United Kingdom).
Bangladesh		Ireland is represented in Bangladesh through its embassy in New Delhi (India).; Bangladesh is represented in Ireland through its embassy in London (United Kingdom).; There are 2,319 Bangladeshis living in Ireland.
Bhutan	N/A	Ireland does not maintain diplomatic relations with Bhutan.
China	22 June 1979	See above and China–Ireland relations: Ireland has an embassy in Beijing, a general consulate in Shanghai and an honorary consulate in Hong Kong.; China has an embassy in Dublin.; There are 10,896 Chinese people living in Ireland.; Chinese Ministry of Foreign Affairs about relations with Ireland
Georgia	12 September 1996	Ireland is represented in Georgia through its embassy in Kyiv (Ukraine).; Georgia has an embassy in Dublin.; Ireland supports EU initiatives to promote peace between Georgia and Russia. Ireland recognises Georgian sovereignty over the separatist regions of Abkhazia and South Ossetia. Ireland condemned the decision of Russia to recognise South Ossetia and Abkhazia as independent states. The parallel the Abkhaz Parliament referred to stems from the fact that the breakaway and largely unrecognised Irish Republic (1919–22), enjoyed some form of recognition from the RSFSR.
India	1947	See India–Ireland relations: Ireland has an embassy in New Delhi and honorary consulates in Bangalore, Chennai, Kolkata and Mumbai.; India has an embassy in Dublin.; There are 16,986 Indians living in Ireland.
Indonesia	4 September 1984	See Indonesia–Ireland relations: Ireland has an embassy in Jakarta.; Indonesia is represented in Ireland through its embassy in London (United Kingdom) and an honorary consulate in Dublin.
Iran	17 February 1976	Ireland is represented in Iran through its embassy in Ankara (Turkey) and an honorary consulate in Tehran. The Irish embassy in Iran was closed in 2012 for cost reasons, however, the embassy is due to reopen before the end of 2023.; Iran has an embassy in Dublin.; After the conclusion of the Iran–Iraq War in 1988, Ireland sent 177 personnel to supervise the ceasefire as part of the United Nations led UNIIMOG.
Iraq	1979	Ireland is represented in Iraq through its embassy in Amman (Jordan).; Iraq has an embassy in Dublin.; There are 1,081 Iraqis living in Ireland.; After the conclusion of the Iran–Iraq War in 1988, Ireland sent 177 personnel to supervise the ceasefire as part of the United Nations led UNIIMOG.
Israel	January 1975	See Ireland–Israel relations: Since 25 January 1996, Ireland has an embassy in Tel Aviv.; Israel had an embassy in Dublin. In December 2024, Israeli Foreign Minister Gideon Saar announced that the embassy would be closing.; Both countries are full members of the Union for the Mediterranean
Japan	5 March 1957	See Ireland–Japan relations: Starting in 1973, Ireland has an embassy in Tokyo and an honorary consulate in Osaka.; Since 1964, Japan has an embassy in Dublin.; The 60th anniversary of diplomatic relations between Japan and Ireland was marked during 2017.; Both countries are full members of the Organisation for Economic Co-operation and Development.; Japan Ministry of Foreign Affairs about relations with Ireland
Jordan	15 May 1984	Ireland has an embassy in Amman.; Jordan is represented in Ireland through its embassy in London (United Kingdom) and an honorary consulate in Dublin.; In February 2016 the King of Jordan, Abdullah II of Jordan, made a state visit to Ireland.
Kazakhstan	10 April 1992	Ireland is represented in Kazakhstan through its embassy in Moscow (Russia) and an honorary consulate in Almaty (Kazakhstan).; Kazakhstan is represented in Ireland through its embassy in London (United Kingdom) and an honorary consulate in Cork.
Kuwait	5 October 1974	Ireland is represented in Kuwait through its embassy in Abu Dhabi (United Arab Emirates).; Kuwait has an embassy office in Dublin.
Lebanon	January 1975	Ireland is represented in Lebanon through its embassy in Cairo (Egypt) and an honorary consulate in Beirut.; Lebanon is represented in Ireland through its embassy in London (United Kingdom).; From 1978 to 2001, a battalion of 580 Irish troops was deployed in Lebanon, rotating every 6 months, as part of the United Nations led force UNIFIL. In all, 30,000 Irish soldiers served in Lebanon over the 23 years. Over the course of this mission 48 Irish soldiers died in Lebanon.
Malaysia	1974	Ireland has an embassy in Kuala Lumpur.; Malaysia has an embassy in Dublin.; There are 3,295 Malaysians living in Ireland.
Mongolia	22 December 1998	Ireland is represented in Mongolia through its embassy in Beijing (China).; Mongolia is represented in Ireland through its embassy in London (United Kingdom) and an honorary consulate in Delgany, County Wicklow.
Nepal	19 August 1999	Ireland is represented in Nepal through its embassy in New Delhi (India) and an honorary consulate in Kathmandu.; Nepal is represented in Ireland through its embassy in London (United Kingdom).; After the April 2015 Nepal earthquake the government of Ireland donated €1.5 million in humanitarian assistance.
North Korea	10 December 2003	DPR Korea opened an embassy in Ireland after they both established diplomatic relations. However, on 16 July 2005, North Korea closed the embassy in Dublin.; Ireland is represented to DPR Korea from its embassy in Seoul.
Oman	July 1987	Ireland is represented in Oman through its embassy in Riyadh (Saudi Arabia) and an honorary consulate in Muscat.; Oman is represented in Ireland through its embassy in London (United Kingdom) and an honorary consulate in Dublin.
Pakistan		See Ireland–Pakistan relations: Ireland is represented in Pakistan through its embassy in Riyadh (Saudi Arabia) and an consulate general in Karachi and is planning to open in Islamabad.; Pakistan has an embassy in Dublin.; There are 6,847 Pakistanis living in Ireland.; Pakistan received over €1.5 million in aid from Ireland in 2011.
Palestine	2000	See Ireland-Palestine relations: Ireland has representative offices in Jerusalem and Ramallah.; Palestine has a mission in Dublin.; Both countries are full members of the Union for the Mediterranean.; In 2011, Foreign Minister Eamon Gilmore spoke at the United Nations in favour of Palestine's application for membership.; Palestine received €5.4 million in Irish aid in 2011.
Philippines	1984	See Ireland–Philippines relations: Diplomatic relations officially began in 1984 and have become more intense over the years as increasing numbers of Filipinos have migrated to Ireland.; Ireland has an embassy in Manila.; The Philippines is represented in Ireland through its embassy in London (United Kingdom) and an honorary consulate in Dublin.; There are 12,791 Filipinos living in Ireland.
Saudi Arabia	September 1974	Ireland has an embassy in Riyadh (Saudi Arabia) and an honorary consulate in Jeddah.; Saudi Arabia has an embassy in Dublin.
Singapore	2 December 1974	Ireland is represented in Singapore through its embassy in Singapore.; Singapore is represented in Ireland through its honorary consulate in Dublin.
South Korea	4 October 1983	See Ireland–South Korea relations: The establishment of diplomatic relations between the Republic of Korea and Ireland started on 4 October 1983.; Irish embassy and an honorary consulate in Seoul.; South Korean embassy in Dublin.; As of August 2022 the ambassador of Ireland to the Republic of Korea is Michelle Winthrop.; As of May 2023 the ambassador of the Republic of Korea to Ireland is Yong-kil Kim.; Ireland has a Working Holiday Programme Agreement with the Republic of Korea, which was at the first time an agreement of its kind of visa with a country in Asia.; Ireland and the Republic of Korea are full members of the Organisation for Economic Co-operation and Development, WTO and the United Nations.; Irish Department of Foreign Affairs and Trade about relations with South Korea; South Korean Ministry of Foreign Affairs and Trade about relations with Ireland (in Korean only)
Sri Lanka	1996	Ireland is represented in Sri Lanka through its embassy in New Delhi (India) and an honorary consulate in Colombo.; Sri Lanka is represented in Ireland through an honorary consulate in Dublin.
Thailand	27 January 1975	Ireland has an embassy in Bangkok.; Thailand is represented in Ireland through its embassy in London (United Kingdom) and an honorary consulate in Dublin.; There are 1,381 Thai living in Ireland.
Turkey	2 October 1951	See Ireland–Turkey relations: Ireland has an embassy in Ankara and honorary consulates in Antalya, Istanbul and İzmir.; Turkey has an embassy in Dublin.; Both countries are full members of the Council of Europe.; There are 1,029 Turks living in Ireland.; In 2010, Irish President Mary McAleese paid a state visit to Turkey.; Turkish Ministry of Foreign Affairs about relations with Ireland
United Arab Emirates	1974	Ireland has an embassy in Abu Dhabi.; The United Arab Emirates has an embassy in Dublin.; As the UAE is Ireland's second largest Asian market many Irish government organizations such as Bord Bia, Enterprise Ireland and Tourism Ireland have offices located in the country.
Vietnam	5 April 1996	Ireland has an embassy in Hanoi.; Vietnam is represented in Ireland through its embassy in London (United Kingdom) and an honorary consulate in Dublin.; Vietnamese prime Minister, Nguyen Tan Dung, visited Ireland in 2008.; Tánaiste Brian Cowen visited Vietnam in 2008.; Vietnam received over €12 million in aid from Ireland in 2011.; Vietnamese Ministry of Foreign Affairs about the relation with Ireland; President Vietnam To Lam visited to Ireland in 2024.

=== Europe ===
Ireland is consistently the most pro-European of EU member states, with 88% of the population approving of EU membership according to a poll in 2022. Ireland was a founding member of the euro single currency. In May 2004, Ireland was one of only three countries to open its borders to workers from the 10 new member states. EU issues important to Ireland include the Common Agricultural Policy, corporation tax harmonisation and the EU Constitution. The Irish electorate declined to ratify the Treaty of Lisbon in 2008. A second referendum in October 2009 passed the bill, allowing the treaty to be ratified. Before it was ratified Ireland required legal guarantees on issues such as the right of Ireland to remain militarily neutral (and not engage in any kind of "European army"), the right of the state to maintain its low levels of corporation tax and that the treaty would not change the Eighth Amendment of the Constitution of Ireland making abortion illegal (since deleted). Ireland has held the Presidency of the Council of the European Union on seven occasions (in 1975, 1979, 1984, 1990, 1996, 2004 and 2013), and is due to hold it for the eight time from July to December 2026.

Country	Formal relations began	Notes
Albania	January 1995	See Albania–Ireland relations: Ireland is represented in Albania through its embassy in Athens (Greece).; Albania is represented in Ireland through its embassy in London (United Kingdom).; Both countries are full members of the Council of Europe.; There are 1,170 Albanians living in Ireland.; There are approximately 5,000 Irish people living in Albania.
Andorra	18 January 1995	Although Ireland is accredited to Andorra from its embassy in Madrid (Spain) all consular queries are with regard to Andorra are dealt with through Ireland's consulate-general in Barcelona.; Andorra does not have an accreditation to Ireland.; Both countries are full members of the Council of Europe.
Austria	1 March 1952	Ireland has an embassy in Vienna.; Austria has an embassy in Ireland, located at 6 Ailesbury Road, Ballsbridge, Dublin. Austria also maintains a Commercial Section at the Merrion Centre, 2nd Floor, Nutley Lane, Dublin.; There are 720 Austrians living in Ireland.; There are 15,000 Irish people living in Austria.; Both countries are full members of the European Union and the Council of Europe.; In 1986, the President of Ireland Patrick Hillery paid a state visit to Austria.; In July 2006, the President of Ireland Mary McAleese paid a state visit to Austria.
Belarus	27 March 1992	Ireland is represented in Belarus through its embassy in Vilnius (Lithuania).; Belarus is represented in Ireland through its embassy in London (United Kingdom) and an honorary consulate in Rathdrum, County Wicklow.; There are 4,000 Belarusians living in Ireland.; There are 15,000 Irish people living in Belarus.
Belgium	7 September 1932	Ireland has an embassy in Brussels and an honorary consulate in Antwerp.; Belgium has an embassy in Dublin and three honorary consulates (Cork, Galway and Limerick).; In 2007 King Albert II of Belgium paid a state visit to Ireland.; There are 1,071 Belgians living in Ireland.; There are 30,000 Irish people living in Belgium.; Both countries are full members of the European Union and the Council of Europe.
Bosnia and Herzegovina	27 September 1995	Ireland is represented in Bosnia and Herzegovina through its embassy in Ljubljana (Slovenia).; Bosnia and Herzegovina is represented in Ireland through its embassy in London (United Kingdom).; Since 1997 Ireland has contributed peacekeeping troops to Bosnia on a number of occasions including the NATO-led Stabilization Force and the EU led EUFOR Althea.; There are 141 Bosnians living in Ireland.; There are 5,000 Irish people living in Bosnia and Herzegovina.
Bulgaria	11 January 1990	Ireland has an embassy in Sofia.; Bulgaria has an embassy in Dublin.; There are 1,759 Bulgarians living in Ireland.; There are 6,000 Irish people living in Bulgaria; Both countries are full members of the European Union and the Council of Europe.
Croatia	27 January 1995	See Croatia–Ireland relations: Ireland has an embassy and honorary consulate in Zagreb.; Croatia has both an embassy and an honorary consulate in Dublin.; There are 24,000 Croats living in Ireland.; There are approximately 5,000 Irish people living in Croatia.; Both countries are full members of the European Union and the Council of Europe.
Cyprus	23 November 1984	See Cyprus-Ireland relations: Ireland has an embassy in Nicosia.; Cyprus has an embassy in Dublin.; In 2005 the president of Cyprus, Tassos Papadopoulos, paid a state visit to Ireland.; Both countries are full members of the European Union and the Council of Europe.; Since 1964, over 9,000 members of the Irish Defense Forces have served in Cyprus without suffering any casualties.; There are 3,984 Cypriots living in Ireland.; There are 6,000 Irish people living in Cyprus.
Czech Republic	1 January 1993	Ireland has an embassy in Prague.; The Czech Republic has an embassy in Dublin.; Both countries are full members of the European Union and the Council of Europe.; There are 5,451 Czechs living in Ireland.; There are approximately 5,000 Irish people living in Czech Republic.
Denmark	January 1962	See Denmark–Ireland relations: Ireland has an embassy in Copenhagen.; Denmark has an embassy in Dublin and three honorary consulates (Cork, Limerick and Waterford).; Both countries are full members of the European Union and the Council of Europe.; There are 801 Danes living in Ireland.; There are 15,000 Irish people living in Denmark.
Estonia	10 September 1991	Ireland recognised Estonia on 27 August 1991.; Ireland has an embassy in Tallinn.; Estonia has an embassy in Dublin and three honorary consulates (Cork, Galway and Limerick).; Both countries are full members of the European Union and the Council of Europe.; There are 2,560 Estonians living in Ireland.; There are 15,000 Irish people living in Estonia.
Finland	2 November 1961	Ireland has an embassy and an honorary consulate in Helsinki.; Finland has an embassy in Dublin and three honorary consulates (Cork, Dublin and Limerick).; There are 868 Finns living in Ireland.; Both countries are full members of the European Union and the Council of Europe.; Finnish Ministry of Foreign Affairs: relations with Ireland
France	19 October 1929	See France–Ireland relations: Ireland has an embassy in Paris and a consulate-general in Lyon.; France has an embassy in Dublin and four honorary consulates (Cork, Limerick, Galway and Waterford).; Both countries are full members of the European Union and the Council of Europe.; Both countries, throughout history, were very friendly with each other, and both fought against Great Britain cooperatively, especially during the 1798 Uprising (however, this was unsuccessful).; There are approximately 9,749 French living in Ireland.; 60% of Irish secondary school students study the French language.; 20% of Irish residents are able to carry on a conversation in French.; French Ministry of Foreign Affairs about relations with Ireland
Germany	27 October 1929	See Germany–Ireland relations: Ireland has an embassy in Berlin and a consulate-general in Frankfurt and four honorary consulates (Cologne(Bergisch Gladbach), Hamburg, Munich and Stuttgart).; Germany has an embassy in Dublin and an honorary consulate in Galway.; Both countries are full members of the European Union and the Council of Europe.; Germany is one of Ireland's biggest trading partners, ranking third in 2014 with an approximately eight per cent share of Ireland's total foreign trade.; There are approximately 11,531 Germans living in Ireland.
Greece	22 January 1975	See Greece–Ireland relations: Ireland has an embassy in Athens and three honorary consulates (Crete, Rhodes and Thessaloniki).; Greece has an embassy in Dublin.; There were 1000 Greeks living in Ireland in 2016, according to that year's census.; Both countries are full members of the European Union and the Council of Europe.; In 2000, Greek President Konstantinos Stephanopoulos visited Dublin.; In 2002, Irish President Mary McAleese visited Athens.; In 2006, Greek Prime Minister Kostas Karamanlis and Greek Foreign Affairs Minister Dora Bakoyannis visited Dublin.; Greek Ministry of Foreign Affairs about relations with Ireland
Guernsey		Ireland has signed several tax treaties with the Guernsey. The treaties provide a mechanism for inter-governmental sharing of information about offshore assets, and avoidance of dual-taxation.
Holy See	27 November 1929	See Holy See–Ireland relations: Ireland has an embassy in Rome to the Holy See.; The Holy See has an apostolic nunciature in Dublin.; In November 2011 Ireland closed its embassy in the Vatican over the Irish Church's handling of sex abuse cases and accusations that the Vatican had encouraged secrecy and obstructed investigations into these matters. The embassy was reopened in January 2014, a sign of thawing relations between the two jurisdictions.; The majority of Irish people are Roman Catholic.
Hungary	1 October 1976	Since 1996, Ireland has an embassy in Budapest.; Since 1991, Hungary has an embassy in Dublin and an honorary consulate in Cork.; Both countries are full members of the European Union and the Council of Europe.; There are approximately 8,034 Hungarians living in Ireland.
Iceland	3 July 1951	See Iceland–Ireland relations: Ireland is represented in Iceland through its embassy in Copenhagen (Denmark) and through an honorary consulate in Garðabær.; Iceland is represented in Ireland through its embassy in London (United Kingdom) and through an honorary consulate in Dublin.; Both countries are full members of the Council of Europe.
Italy	27 September 1937	Ireland has an embassy in Rome and an honorary consulate in Milan.; Italy has an embassy in Dublin and two honorary consulates (Galway and Cork).; There are 7,656 Italians living in Ireland.; Both countries are full members of the European Union and the Council of Europe.
Jersey		Ireland has signed several tax treaties with Jersey. The treaties provide a mechanism for inter-governmental sharing of information about offshore assets, and avoidance of dual-taxation.
Kosovo	11 November 2008	See Ireland–Kosovo relations: Ireland is represented in Kosovo through its embassy in Budapest (Hungary).; Kosovo declared its independence from Serbia on 17 February 2008 and Ireland recognised it on 29 February 2008.; On 6 December 2011, Kosovan Ambassador to the United Kingdom Muhamet Hamiti presented the credentials of Kosovan President Atifete Jahjaga to Irish President Michael D. Higgins; thus making Hamiti the non-resident ambassador to Ireland.; Ireland contributed 279 peacekeeping troops to the NATO led Kosovo Force, of which 12 personal are still active.
Latvia	9 October 1991	Ireland recognised Latvia's independence on 27 August 1991.; Ireland has an embassy in Riga.; Latvia has an embassy in Dublin.; Both countries are full members of the European Union and the Council of Europe.; There are approximately 20,593 Latvians living in Ireland.
Liechtenstein	1992	Ireland is represented in Liechtenstein through its embassy in Bern (Switzerland).; Liechtenstein is represented in Ireland through the embassy of Switzerland in Dublin.
Lithuania	2 September 1991	Ireland recognised Lithuania on 27 August 1991.; Ireland has an embassy in Vilnius.; Lithuania has an embassy in Dublin and two honorary consulates in Carrickmacross, County Monaghan and Dublin.; Both countries are full members of the European Union and the Council of Europe.; There are approximately 36,683 Lithuanians living in Ireland.; Lithuanian Ministry of Foreign Affairs: list of bilateral treaties with Ireland (in Lithuanian)
Luxembourg	20 December 1961	Ireland has an embassy in Luxembourg.; Luxembourg is represented in Ireland through its embassy in London (United Kingdom) and an honorary consulate in Dublin.; Both countries are full members of the European Union and the Council of Europe.
Malta	13 June 1990	Ireland has an embassy in Ta' Xbiex.; Malta has an embassy in Dublin and two honorary consulates (Dublin and Cork).; There are 180 Maltese living in Ireland.; Both countries are full members of the European Union and the Council of Europe.; The Irish Defence Forces trains officer cadets of the Armed Forces of Malta (AFM)
Isle of Man		See Ireland-Isle of Man relations: Ireland has signed several tax agreements with the Isle of Man. The agreements provide a mechanism for inter-governmental sharing of information about offshore assets, and avoidance of dual-taxation.; Ireland and the Isle of Man have collaborated on preparing reports and jointly opposing the Sellafield nuclear plant to the UK government.
Moldova	13 July 1999	Ireland is represented in Moldova through its embassy in Bucharest (Romania).; Moldova is represented in Ireland through its embassy in Dublin (Ireland).; Both countries are full members of the Council of Europe.; There are 2,881 Moldovans living in Ireland.; Moldovan Ministry of Foreign Affairs about relations with Ireland
Monaco	14 December 2006	Although Ireland has an honorary consulate in Monaco, Ireland is represented through its embassy in Paris (France).; Monaco has an honorary consulate in Dublin.
Montenegro	20 June 2006	Ireland is represented in Montenegro through its embassy in Budapest (Hungary).; Montenegro declared its independence from Serbia on 3 June 2006 and Ireland recognised it on 20 June 2006.; Both countries are full members of the Council of Europe.; Ireland is an EU member and Montenegro is an EU candidate.
Netherlands	1945	Ireland has an embassy in The Hague.; The Netherlands has an embassy in Dublin and an honorary consulate in Cork; There are 4,313 Dutch people living in Ireland.; Both countries are full members of the European Union and the Council of Europe.; Dutch Ministry of Foreign Affairs about relations with Ireland
North Macedonia	13 December 1994	Ireland is represented in North Macedonia through its embassy in Bucharest (Romania).; North Macedonia is represented in Ireland through its embassy in London (United Kingdom) and an honorary consulate in Dublin.; Both countries are full members of the Council of Europe.
Norway	17 February 1950	Ireland has an embassy in Oslo.; Norway has an embassy in Dublin and an honorary consulate in Cork.; Both countries are full members of the Council of Europe.
Poland	30 September 1976	See Ireland–Poland relations: Ireland has an embassy in Warsaw and an honorary consulate in Poznań.; Poland has an embassy in Dublin and two honorary consulates (Cork and Limerick).; Both countries are full members of the European Union and the Council of Europe.; There are approximately 150,000 Poles living in Ireland, the largest minority in the country.
Portugal	26 February 1942	Ireland has an embassy in Lisbon.; Portugal has an embassy in Dublin and an honorary consulate in Cork.; There are 2,739 Portuguese living in Ireland.; Both countries are full members of the European Union and the Council of Europe.
Romania	18 April 1990	Ireland has an embassy in Bucharest.; Romania has an embassy in Dublin.; Both countries are full members of the European Union and the Council of Europe.; There are 17,304 Romanians living in Ireland.
Russia	29 September 1973	See Ireland–Russia relations: Ireland has an embassy in Moscow. and an honorary consulate in Saint Petersburg.; Russia has an embassy Dublin and two honorary consulates (Limerick and Thurles, County Tipperary).; There are 3,896 Russians living in Ireland.; The Russian SFSR drafted a treaty which would have made it the first country to recognise the independence of Ireland in 1920, however, the Russian SFSR failed to ratify it.; Cooperation between both countries has been more active since the end of the Cold War. Many bilateral treaties exist between both nations in various fields (taxation, investment protection, cultural and scientific, aviation, etc.).
San Marino	13 January 1995	Ireland is represented in San Marino through its embassy in Rome (Italy).; San Marino has an honorary consulate in Limerick.
Serbia	1977	See Ireland–Serbia relations: Ireland is represented in Serbia through its embassy in Athens (Greece) and an honorary consulate in Belgrade (Serbia).; Serbia is represented in Ireland through its embassy in London (United Kingdom).; Both countries are full members of the Council of Europe.; Ireland is an EU member and Serbia is an EU candidate.
Slovakia	1 January 1993	Ireland has an embassy in Bratislava.; Slovakia has an embassy in Dublin.; Both countries are full members of the European Union and the Council of Europe.; There are 10,801 Slovaks living in Ireland.; In 2010 Slovak airport security planted actual explosives in the luggage of unsuspecting passengers as part of a security exercise. As result of additional mistakes, the explosives were flown to Dublin, Ireland causing international controversy. Prime Minister Fico refused to dismiss the interior minister after the incident.
Slovenia	25 January 1996	Ireland has an embassy in Ljubljana.; Slovenia has an embassy in Dublin, and an honorary consulate in Naas, County Kildare.; There are 192 Slovenes living in Ireland.; Both countries are full members of the European Union and the Council of Europe.
Spain	3 September 1935	See Ireland–Spain relations: Ireland has an embassy in Madrid and 10 honorary consulates (in Alicante, Arrecife, Barcelona, Bilbao, Ferrol, Las Palmas, Mallorca, Málaga, Santa Cruz de Tenerife and Seville).; Spain has an embassy in Dublin and five honorary consulates (Cork, Limerick, Galway, Waterford and Sligo).; Both countries are full members of the European Union and the Council of Europe.; There are 6,794 Spaniards living in Ireland.; Spain is the number one destination for Irish tourists worldwide, with over 1.3 million visitors from Ireland every year.; Irish Ministry of Foreign Affairs: directions of Irish representations in Spain
Sweden	18 July 1946	See Ireland–Sweden relations: Ireland has an embassy in Stockholm.; Sweden has an embassy in Dublin.; There are 1,713 Swedes living in Ireland.; Both countries are full members of the European Union and the Council of Europe.
Switzerland	1939	Ireland has an embassy in Bern and an honorary consulate in Zürich.; Switzerland has an embassy in Dublin.; As of 2010 there are 1,449 Swiss people living in Ireland.; Both countries are full members of the Council of Europe.
Ukraine	1 April 1992	See Ireland–Ukraine relations: Ireland recognised the Ukrainian state in 1991.; Ireland has an embassy in Kyiv.; Ukraine has an embassy in Dublin.; There are 3,343 Ukrainians living in Ireland.; Both countries are full members of the Council of Europe.; Ukrainian Ministry of Foreign Affairs about relations with Ireland
United Kingdom	8 January 1923	See above and Ireland–United Kingdom relations: Ireland has an embassy, a visa office and a passport office in London, and consulates-general in Cardiff, Edinburgh and Manchester.; United Kingdom has an embassy in Dublin.; Previous embassy on Merrion Square was burnt during a riot on 2 February 1972.; In July 1976, British ambassador Christopher Ewart-Biggs was assassinated by the Provisional IRA.; In August 1979 Lord Louis Mountbatten was assassinated by the IRA while on a private holiday in Co Sligo. As maternal uncle of Prince Philip, Duke of Edinburgh, and a second cousin of King George VI he was a member of the British Royal Family; There are 288,627 British people living in Ireland.; Both countries are full members of the Council of Europe.; Ireland was part of the United Kingdom until 1922.; British Foreign Office about relations with Ireland

=== Oceania ===
No formal diplomatic relations

Country	Formal relations began	Notes
Australia	1945	See Australia–Ireland relations: Ireland has an embassy in Canberra, a consulate general in Sydney and an honorary consulate in Perth.; Australia has an embassy in Dublin.; There are 2,849 Australians living in Ireland.; About 20% of the Australian population have Irish ancestry, which often predates Irish Independence in 1922.; Australia Department of Foreign Affairs and Trade about relations with Ireland
New Zealand	1965	See Ireland–New Zealand relations: From 2018 Ireland will establish an embassy in New Zealand confirmed by the President of Ireland in October 2017 during his State visit to New Zealand. Respectively, New Zealand's Prime Minister announced they would also open an embassy in Dublin in the same year. Previously, New Zealand had been represented in Ireland via its High Commission in London, and Ireland in New Zealand via its Australian embassy in Canberra.; Ireland has an embassy in Wellington.; New Zealand has an embassy in Dublin.; There are 1,394 New Zealanders living in Ireland.; Around one in every six New Zealanders claims Irish descent.; Both countries are full members of the Organisation for Economic Co-operation and Development.; There is a community of people of Irish descent living in New Zealand.; New Zealand Ministry of Foreign Affairs and Trade about relations with Ireland

== United Nations ==
The United Nations was founded in 1945, but Ireland's membership was blocked by the Soviet Union until 1955, "partly because of Dublin's neutrality" during the Second World War. Since 2017, the Irish ambassador to the UN Office at Geneva has been Michael Gaffey. Ireland has been elected to the UN Security Council as a non-permanent member on four occasions — in 1962, in 1981–1982, in 2001–2002 and most recently in 2021–2022.

Ireland is a member state of the International Criminal Court, having signed the Rome Statute in 1998 and ratified it in 2002.

Irish Aid, the Government of Ireland's programme of assistance to developing countries financed the redesign of the UNV Online Volunteering service website in 2008 and supported its operations from 2007 to 2010, which led to a significant growth in the number of online volunteers and the tasks they completed.

In 2017, Ireland signed the UN treaty on the Prohibition of Nuclear Weapons.

=== Peacekeeping missions ===
Ireland has a long history of participation in UN peacekeeping efforts starting in 1958, just three years after joining the UN. As of August 2018, 90 members of the Irish Defence Forces had been killed on peacekeeping missions.

List of major peacekeeping operations:

- June 1958 – December 1958: UNOGIL observer mission to Lebanon
- 1958–present: UNTSO mission to the Middle East
- 1960–1964: ONUC mission to Congo
- 1964–present: UNFICYP mission to Cyprus
- 1973–1974: UNEF II mission to Sinai after the Yom Kippur War
- 1978–present: UNIFIL mission to Lebanon
- 1988–1991: UNIIMOG mission to the Iran-Iraq border following the Iran–Iraq War
- 1993–1995: UNOSOM II "peace enforcement" mission to Somalia
- 1997–2004: SFOR mission to former Yugoslavia
- 1999–present: KFOR mission to Kosovo
- 1999–2000: INTERFET mission to East Timor
- 2003–2018: UNMIL mission to Liberia
- 2008–present: EUFOR Chad/CAR mission to Chad and the Central African Republic

As well as these missions, Irish personnel have served as observers in Central America, Russia, Cambodia, Afghanistan, Namibia, Western Sahara, Kuwait and South Africa.

== Ireland and the Commonwealth of Nations ==
Ireland was a member state of the British Commonwealth from 1922 until 1949, initially as a Dominion called the Irish Free State from 1922 until 1937, when Ireland adopted a new constitution and changed the name of the state to "Ireland". Although the King's position was removed from the Constitution in 1936, but included in the External Relations Act 1936 itself, a republic was only formally declared from 18 April 1949 when the Republic of Ireland Act 1948 came into effect.

Under the rules for membership at the time, a republic could not be a member state of the Commonwealth. Only a Dominion could be a British Commonwealth member state, along with King George VI as their head of state.

This was changed a week later with the adoption of the London Declaration, then India became the first Commonwealth republic on 26 January 1950. King George VI became the first Head of the Commonwealth as a result.

Since 1998, some people in Ireland have advocated joining the Commonwealth of Nations, most notably Éamon Ó Cuív, Frank Feighan, and Mary Kenny.

Andrew Rosindell, the Conservative Member of Parliament for Romford, has also called for Ireland to return to its membership of the Commonwealth.

== International organisations ==
Ireland is a member of or otherwise participates in the following international organisations:

- Asian Development Bank
- Australia Group
- Bank for International Settlements
- Common Security and Defence Policy
- Council of Europe
- Council of Europe Development Bank
- Euro-Atlantic Partnership Council
- European Bank for Reconstruction and Development
- European Defence Agency
- European Investment Bank
- Economic and Monetary Union of the European Union
- European Space Agency
- European Union
- Food and Agriculture Organization
- International Atomic Energy Agency
- International Bank for Reconstruction and Development
- International Civil Aviation Organization
- International Criminal Court
- International Red Cross and Red Crescent Movement
- International Development Association
- International Energy Agency
- International Fund for Agricultural Development
- International Finance Corporation
- International Labour Organization
- International Monetary Fund
- International Maritime Organization
- Interpol
- Intergovernmental Oceanographic Commission
- International Organization for Migration
- Inter-Parliamentary Union
- International Organization for Standardization
- International Telecommunication Union
- Multilateral Investment Guarantee Agency
- United Nations Mission for the Referendum in Western Sahara
- United Nations Mission in the Democratic Republic of Congo
- Nuclear Energy Agency
- Nuclear Suppliers Group
- Organization of American States (observer)
- OECD
- Organisation for the Prohibition of Chemical Weapons
- Organization for Security and Co-operation in Europe
- Pacific Alliance (observer)
- Paris Club
- Permanent Court of Arbitration
- Partnership for Peace
- United Nations
- United Nations Conference on Trade and Development
- UNESCO
- UNHCR
- United Nations Industrial Development Organization
- United Nations Interim Force in Lebanon
- United Nations Mission in Liberia
- United Nations Operation in Côte d'Ivoire
- United Nations Truce Supervision Organization
- Universal Postal Union
- World Customs Organization
- Western European Union (observer)
- World Health Organization
- World Intellectual Property Organization
- World Meteorological Organization
- World Trade Organization
- Zangger Committee

== Foreign aid ==
Ireland's aid programme was founded in 1974, and in 2017 its budget amounted to €651 million. The government had previously set a target of reaching the Millennium Development Goal of 0.7% of Gross National Product in aid by 2012, which was not met as aid was reduced as a result of the Irish financial crisis. Irish development aid is concentrated on eight priority countries: Lesotho, Mozambique, Tanzania, Ethiopia, Zambia, Uganda, Vietnam and East Timor. In 2006, Malawi was announced as the ninth priority country, with a tenth country to follow.

== Human rights ==
There have been no serious civil, human or social rights abuses/problems in the State, according to Amnesty International and the U.S. State Department. The country consistently comes among the top nations in terms of freedom and rights ratings.

Index	Ranking (Most Recent)	Result
Freedom in the World – Political Rights	1st (Joint)	1 ("Free")
Freedom in the World – Civil Liberties	1st (Joint)	1 ("Free")
Index of Economic Freedom	9th	76.9 ("Mostly Free")
Worldwide Press Freedom Index Ranking	15th	−4.00 ("Free")
Global Peace Index	6th (Joint)	1.33 ("More Peaceful")
Democracy Index	12th	8.79 ("Full Democracy")
International Property Rights Index	13th (Joint)	7.9
Corruption Perceptions Index	16th (Joint)	7.7
Fragile States Index	170th (7th from the bottom)	26.5 ("Sustainable")

== See also ==
- Ireland–NATO relations
- Common Travel Area
- List of diplomatic missions in Ireland
- List of diplomatic missions of Ireland
- Message to the Free Nations of the World
