= Hamiti =

Hamiti is a surname. Notable people with the surname include:

- Dean Hamiti (born 2003), American wrestler
- Farès Hamiti (born 1987), Algerian footballer
- Muhamet Hamiti (born 1964), Kosovar politician
