= Indonesia–Ireland relations =

- Indonesia: Ireland

The Republics of Indonesia and Ireland established diplomatic relations on 4 September 1984 and since then they have had strong correlations. In addition to politics, economy, the internet and creative sectors, as well as education and culture, the two nations are dedicated to fostering real cooperation in these areas. Ireland opened its embassy in Jakarta in 2014, whereas the Indonesian embassy in London, England is accredited to Ireland. Despite no full diplomatic presence, Indonesia maintains an honorary consulate in Dublin. Both countries are members of the World Trade Organization and the United Nations.

== History ==
The outcomes of the bilateral consultation between Ireland and Indonesia, held at the director general level on October 13, 2022, included an agreement to maximize potentials in the areas of digital and creative industries, environment, sustainable tourism, energy forests, and higher education, as well as to promote trade and investment value.

Offering chances to strengthen bilateral collaboration, Ireland announced "Global Ireland, Delivering in the Asia Pacific Region to 2025" in January 2020.

On 23 September 2024, Indonesian Foreign Minister Retno Marsudi and her Irish counterpart Micheál Martin have improved their bilateral ties by signing a memorandum of understanding on the sidelines of the 79th United Nations General Assembly (UNGA) in New York. It is expected that the agreement will strengthen both nations' political processes for debating international problems of mutual interest and bilateral collaboration.

== Trade ==
Indonesia sold $183 million to Ireland in 2021. Computers ($33.9 million), polyacetals ($10.6 million) and office machine parts ($9.16 million) are Indonesia's top exports to Ireland. 26 years prior, Indonesian exports to Ireland have risen at an average rate of 4.75% from $54.7 million to $183 million.

Ireland exported $121 million to Indonesia in 2021. Packaged medications, casein and concentrated milk made up the bulk of Ireland's exports to Indonesia ($15.9 million, $10.7 million and $9.68 million respectively). Ireland's exports to Indonesia have grown over the previous 26 years at a yearly rate of 4.43% from $39.4 million to $121 million.

In 2023, Ireland and Indonesia exchanged €389 million worth of products. Among Ireland's top exports to Indonesia are dairy products, eggs, and off-road vehicles. Although Indonesia imports a wide variety of items to Ireland, the most common imports are computers and data processing equipment.

== See also ==
- Foreign relations of Indonesia
- Foreign relations of Ireland
