= Ireland–Pakistan relations =

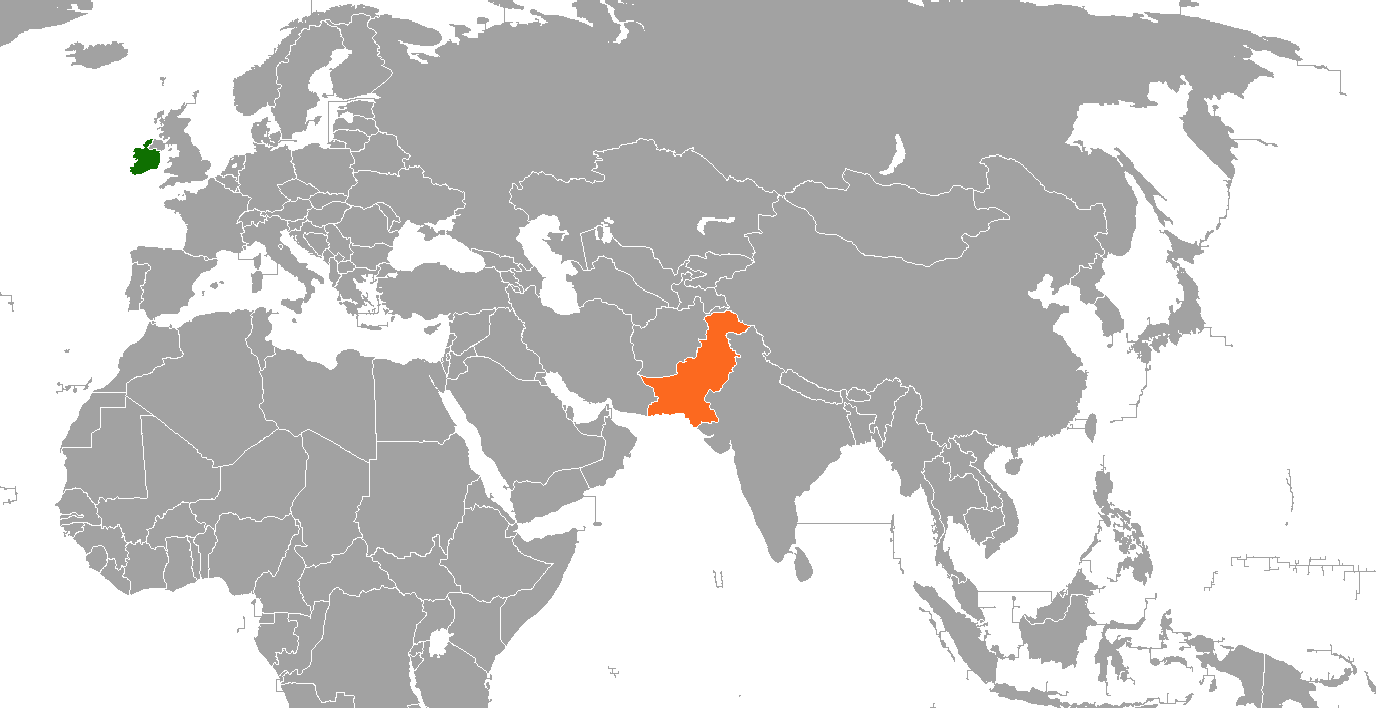

- Ireland: Pakistan

Ireland–Pakistan relations are the bilateral relations between Ireland and Pakistan. Ireland has an embassy in Islamabad. Pakistan had an embassy in Dublin.

== History ==
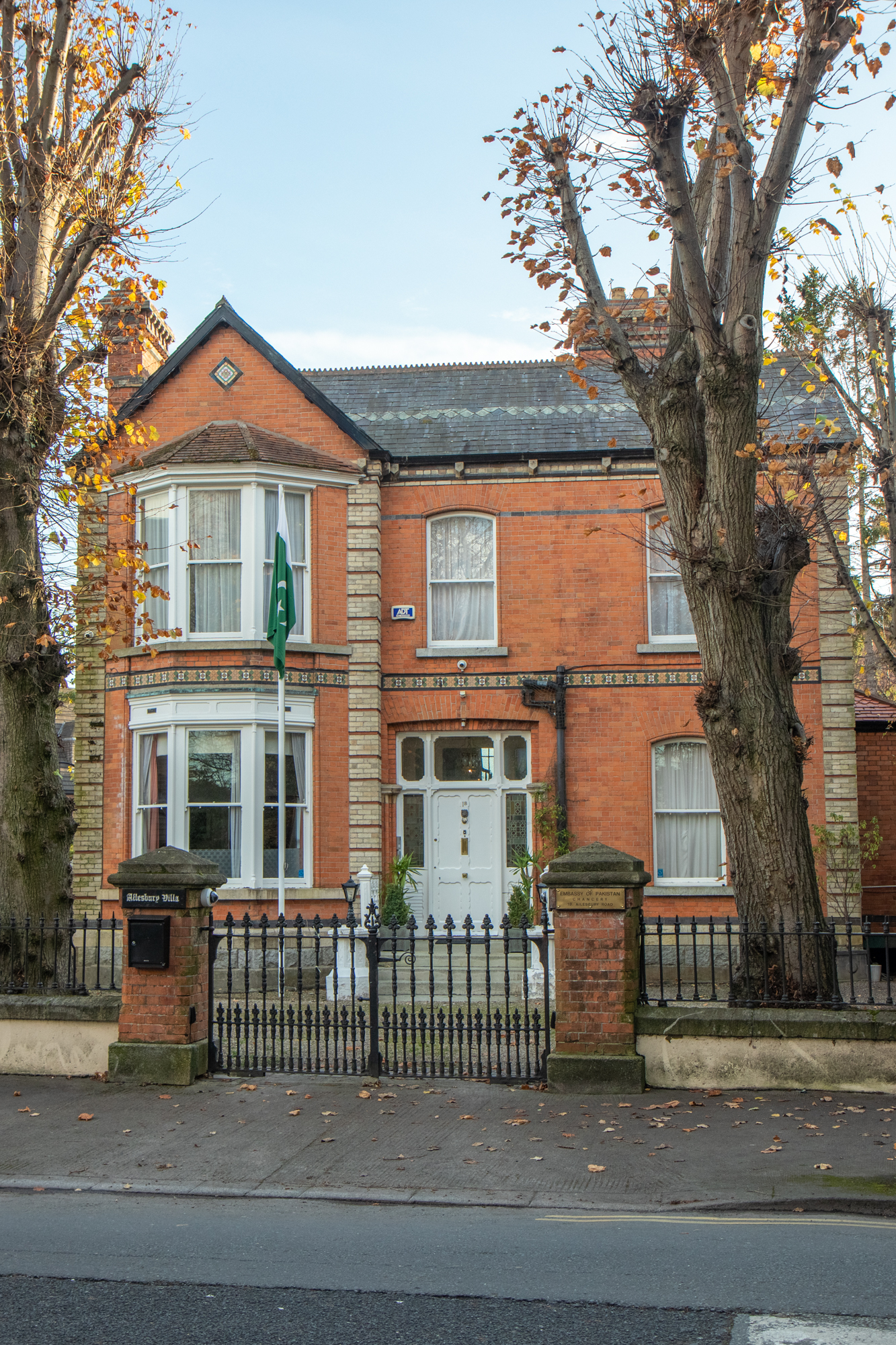
Embassy of Pakistan in Dublin

Pakistan established its embassy in Dublin on 1 March 2001.

In April 2004 while Ireland had the Presidency of the European Council representing the EU on the world stage, Irish European Affairs Minister Dick Roche said that the EU should engage with Pakistan to bolster its democracy.

In December 2004, Humayun Akhtar Khan, Pakistani Minister for Commerce accompanied by Tariq Iqbal Puri, the Economic Minister of the Embassy of Pakistan in Brussels, met with the Irish Minister responsible for trade policy, Michael Ahern in the Irish Department of Enterprise, Trade & Employment. The Pakistani commerce minister briefed the Irish about the improving economic conditions in Pakistan and government reforms in the economic sector.

== Irish aid ==
In 2005, Ireland provided €5 million to Pakistan in relief aid after an earthquake in Kashmir.

In April 2007, a memorandum of understanding was signed for the establishment of a Pakistan-Ireland Joint Business Council by Zubair F. Tufail, President Ghulam Bari and Secretary Yousaf Sharee from Association of Pakistanis in Ireland. Chairman of the Ireland-Pakistan Business Council in the presence of Michael Ahren, Irish Minister for International Trade, T.D and Irish Ambassador in Islamabad.

== Trade ==
Pakistan's trade with Ireland significantly increased between 2004 and 2007. Major Pakistani exports to Ireland included cotton fabrics, made-ups articles of textile material, carpets, rugs and surgical instruments.

== Pakistanis in Ireland ==
There is a sizable community of Pakistanis in Ireland, mostly consisting of doctors and other medics and their families. Due to a longtime shortage of doctors in Ireland, the country has incorporated many foreign doctors from countries like Pakistan going as far back as the late 1980s and early 1990s. The 2022 official census in Ireland recorded 15,185 Pakistani born people living in Ireland.

== See also ==
- Foreign relations of Ireland
- Foreign relations of Pakistan
