= Irish Chileans =

Chileans of Irish ancestry and Irish-born person migrated to Chile

Hiberno-chilenos; Gael-Sileánach

Total population
- 120,000; 1% population of Chile

Regions with significant populations
- Punta Arenas, Magallanes Region, Santiago, Chile

Languages
- Predominantly Spanish, Minority speaks English and/or Irish as first language.

Religion
- Roman Catholicism.

Related ethnic groups
- Irish people, Irish Americans, Irish Argentines, Irish Brazilians, Irish Canadians, Irish Mexicans, Irish Paraguayans, Irish Peruvians, Irish Uruguayans, Scottish people, Scottish Chileans, Welsh Chileans.

Irish Chileans (in Spanish: Hiberno-chilenos, Irish: Gael-Sileánach) are the inhabitants of Chile who either came from some part of the island of Ireland or are descendants of immigrants from there. Generally coming in the 18th century and early 19th century, the generally Catholic Irish were seeking refuge from the oppression of the Protestant-run government of the Kingdom of Great Britain. Spain, being a Catholic power, enticed many Irish to move to Latin America. Immigration diminished later in the 19th century as Catholic Emancipation made emigration to a Catholic nation less of a vital consideration and as the United States and Canada established themselves as more viable lands for settlement.

A large proportion of Irish Chileans are sheep farmers in the Magallanes Region of the far south of the country, and the city of Punta Arenas has a large Irish foundation dating back to the 18th century.

The most notable Irish Chilean, Bernardo O'Higgins, is often referred to as the "Father of Chile", and is commemorated in many places in Chile.

== Notable Irish Chileans ==
- Sega Bodega, Electronic artist and producer
- Jorge Arrate, Communist Party of Chile politician.
- Patricio Aylwin, President of Chile
- Paz Bascuñán Aylwin, actress
- Alberto Blest Gana (1830-1920), a Chilean novelist and diplomat
- Pedro Dartnell, Chilean Army Inspector General
- Carlos Ibáñez del Campo, Chilean general and twice president of the republic
- Patricio Lynch, Admiral of the Chilean Navy
- Juan Mackenna, general, Chilean patriot
- Pablo Mackenna, writer, TV host, poet
- Bernardo O'Higgins, Supreme Director of Chile
- Sandra O'Ryan, actress
- Benjamín Vicuña Mackenna politician, writer (Irish grandfather: Juan MacKenna).
- Camila Vallejo (Vallejo-Dowling), Communist Youth of Chile politician.

== See also ==
- Chile–Ireland relations
- Irish Argentines
- Irish Mexicans
- British Chileans
