= Ireland–South Korea relations =

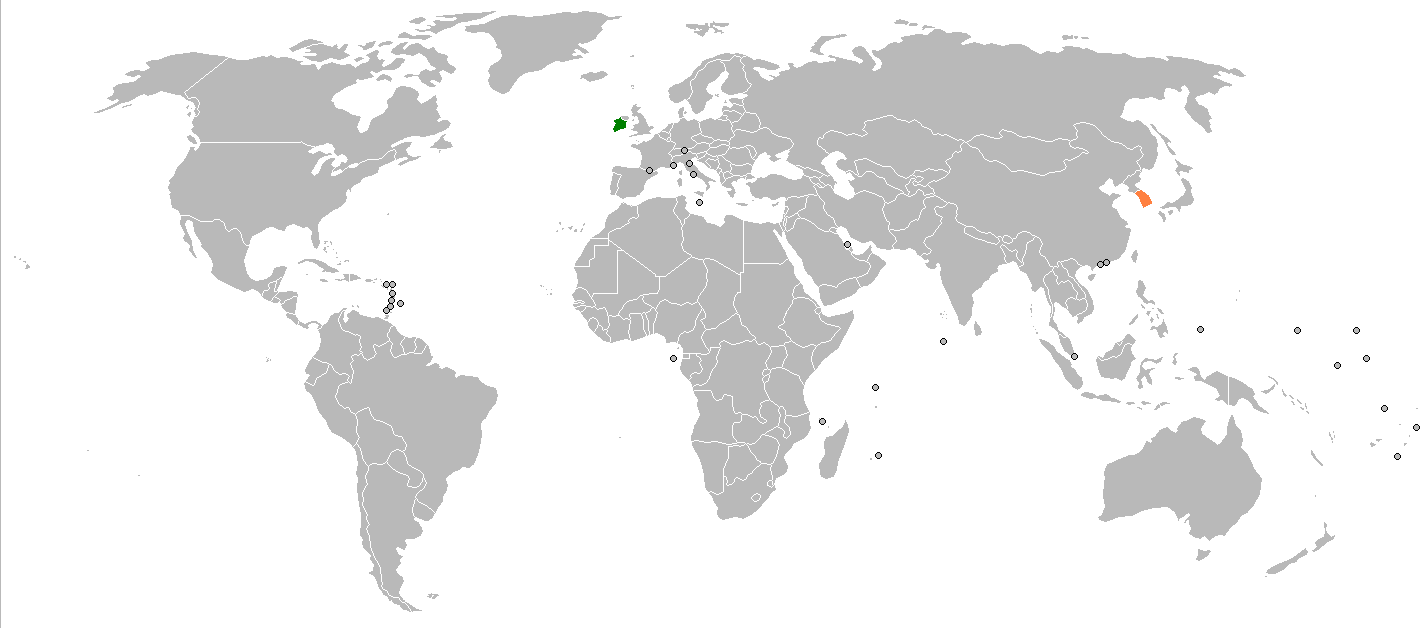

- Ireland: South Korea

Ireland–South Korea relations are the bilateral relations encompassing diplomatic, political, economic, cultural, and people-to-people exchanges between Ireland and South Korea. The two countries established diplomatic relations in 1983 and have since developed cooperative ties based on shared values such as democracy, human rights, and free trade.

Ireland maintains an embassy in Seoul, while South Korea operates an embassy in Dublin.

== History ==
Relations between South Korea and Ireland began to take shape indirectly during the Korean War. Some Irish nationals became connected to the Korean Peninsula through international organizations, medical work, and humanitarian activities during the war. In the postwar period, visits by involved individuals and commemorative events highlighted the early historical links between the two countries.

In 1954, Patrick James McGlinchey, a Catholic missionary from Ireland, arrived in Jeju Island and devoted himself to agricultural technology transfer and social welfare activities. He helped Jeju farmers achieve self-sufficiency through livestock breeding and agricultural education, and he was involved in establishing various welfare facilities such as orphanages, clinics, and kindergartens. His efforts had a significant impact on the development of the Jeju community and are regarded as a prominent historical example of people-to-people exchange between Ireland and Jeju.

The two countries officially established diplomatic relations on 4 October 1983. Subsequently, South Korea opened an embassy in Dublin in 1987, and Ireland established an embassy in Seoul in 1989, providing an institutional foundation for their diplomatic relations.

In 2005, Mary McAleese, the President of Ireland, visited Jeju Island as part of her official schedule in South Korea. She and her delegation entered via Jeju International Airport and toured areas including the Jungmun Saekdal Beach. This visit marked the first time an Irish president had visited Jeju since the establishment of diplomatic ties and was seen as a symbol of the growing friendship between the two countries and the international recognition of Jeju Island.

== Diplomacy and politics ==
South Korea and Ireland share common values of democracy, the rule of law, and respect for human rights, and they maintain cooperative relations through multilateral international organizations such as the United Nations and the OECD.

The two countries have discussed political and diplomatic issues through exchanges between foreign ministers and senior government officials. These exchanges also help strengthen the institutional foundation for economic, cultural, and educational cooperation.

== Economic relations ==
Economic relations between South Korea and Ireland have expanded since the implementation of the South Korea–European Union Free Trade Agreement. Ireland serves as a strategic gateway for South Korean companies entering the European market, while South Korea is considered a key Asian trade partner for Ireland.

Ireland exports pharmaceuticals, agricultural products, and chemical goods to South Korea, while South Korea exports automobiles, electronics, and machinery to Ireland.

== Cultural and social exchanges ==
South Korea and Ireland have promoted mutual understanding through cultural events and people-to-people exchanges. In South Korea, events related to Irish culture, including Saint Patrick's Day celebrations, are held, helping to raise awareness of Irish culture.

Additionally, a friendship agreement between Dublin and Seoul facilitates cooperation in various areas, including climate change response, smart city development, and cultural exchange.

== Resident diplomatic missions ==
- Ireland has an embassy in Seoul.
- South Korea has an embassy in Dublin.
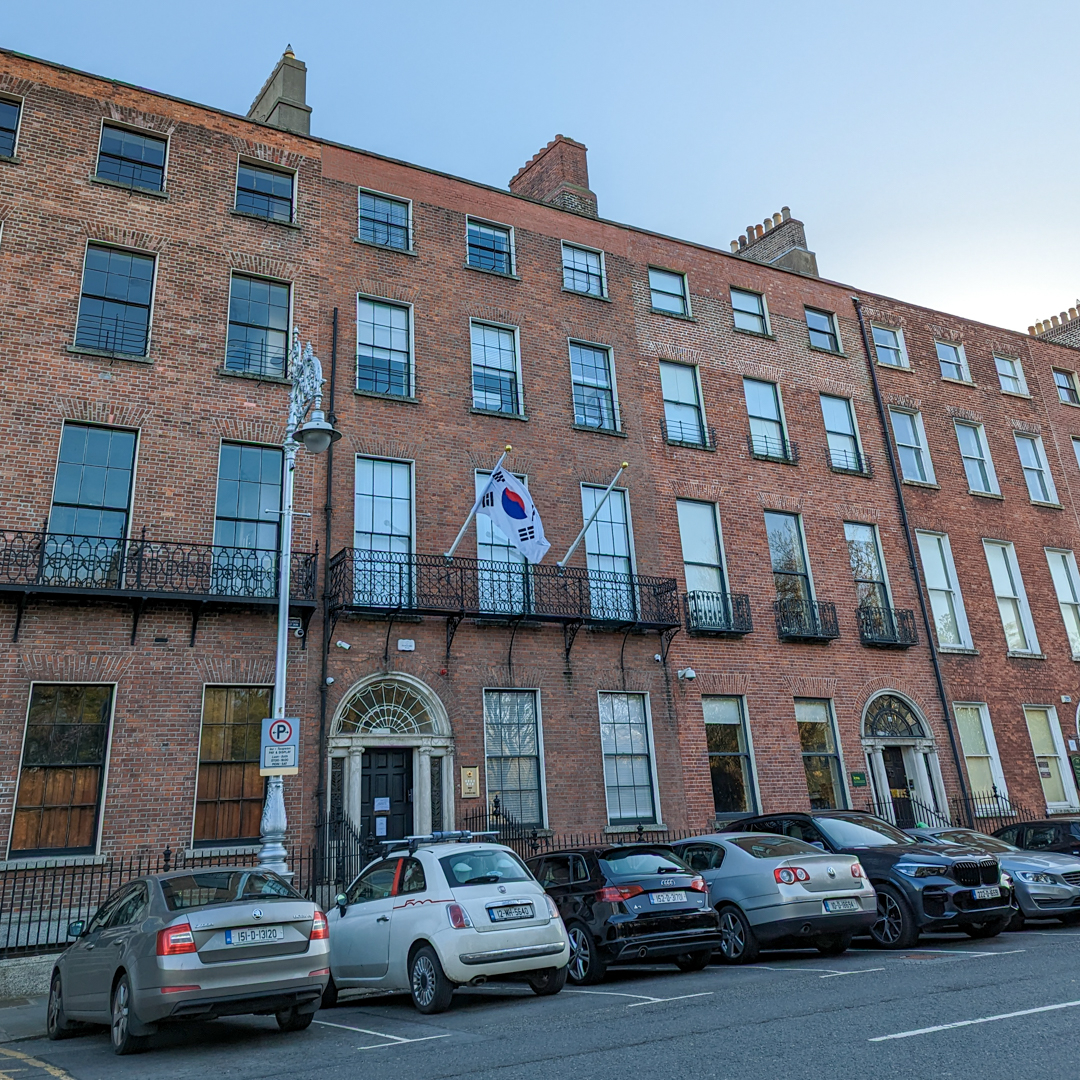
Embassy of South Korea in Dublin

== See also ==
- Foreign relations of Ireland
- Foreign relations of South Korea
