= Ethiopia–Ireland relations =

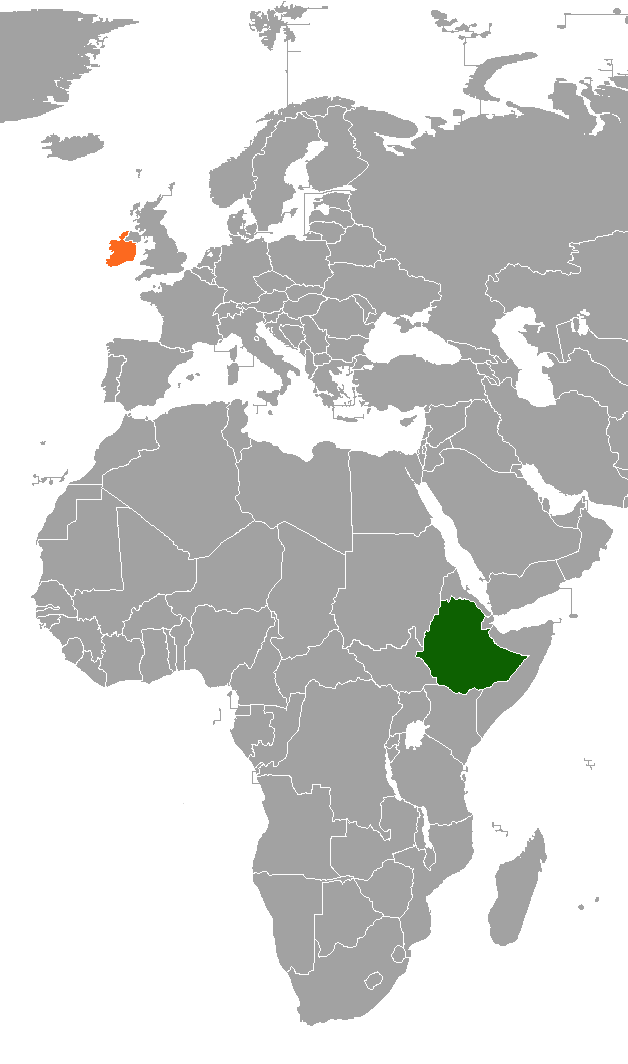

- Ethiopia: Ireland

Ethiopia–Ireland relations are foreign relations between Ethiopia and Ireland. Both countries established diplomatic relations in 1994, the same year Ireland opened an embassy in Addis Ababa. Ethiopia had an embassy in Dublin before its closure in 2021. But was reopened before this was finished.

Both countries signed a Technical Agreement 21 February 1995.

== History ==
Ethiopia and Ireland established diplomatic relations in 1994 the same year both opened each other's embassies.

== High level visits ==
In 2005, the Minister of State at the Department of Foreign Affairs with responsibility for development cooperation, Joan Burton visited Ethiopia. The Minister of Foreign Affairs, Seyoum Mesfin visited Ireland, and in 2002 Prime Minister Meles Zenawi also paid Ireland a formal visit.

== Foreign aid ==
Ireland disbursed US$58.94 million to Ethiopia in 2007, making it sixth in bilateral donors. Irish foreign aid to Ethiopia includes grants towards focuses on Vulnerability, Health, Education, HIV and AIDS and Governance, either directly via Irish Aid, through NGOs, and missionary societies. These grants amounted to € 32 million in 2007, and over €37 million in 2006. In January 2003, the Irish Minister of State at the Department of Foreign Affairs with responsibility for overseas aid, Tom Kitt, visited Ethiopia to see how his country could assist in famine relief. He planned to visit the Tigray Region, which was reported as being the most affected by famine at the time.

== Trade ==
All imports from Ethiopia to Ireland are duty-free and quota-free, with the exception of armaments, as part of the Everything but Arms initiative of the European Union.

== Embassy of Ethiopia, Dublin ==
Embassy of the Federal Democratic Republic of Ethiopia, Dublin
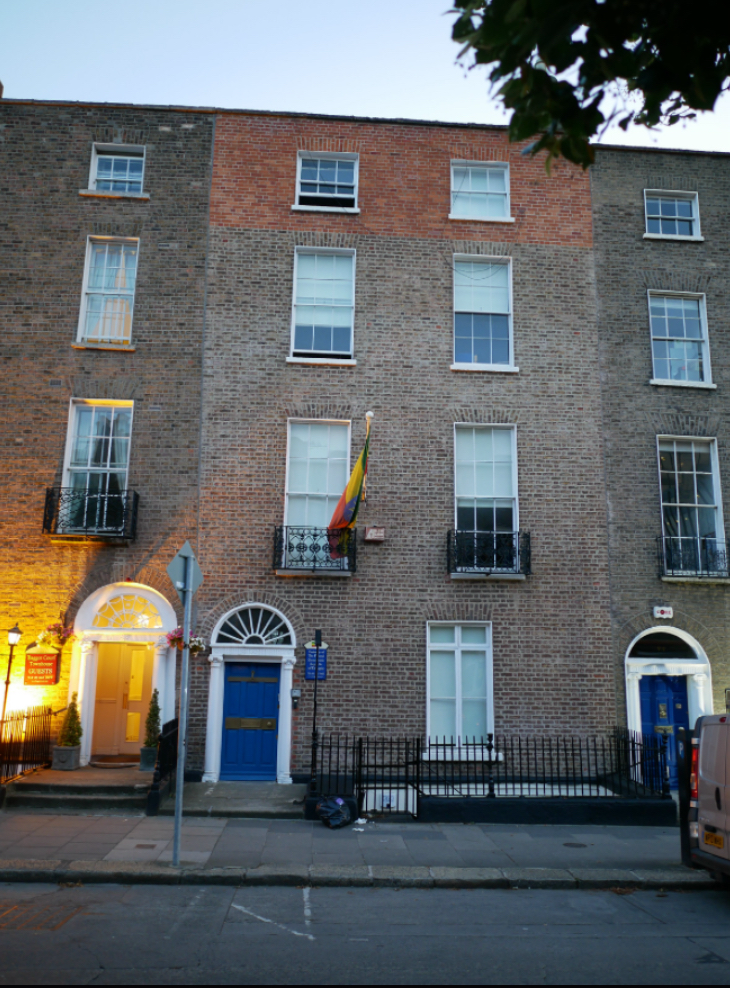
- Location: Dublin 2, Dublin
- Address: 93 Lower Baggot Street, Dublin 2
- Coordinates: 53°33′5.3″N 6°24′7.3″W
- Opened: 1994
- Closed: 2021
- Ambassador: H.E. Mrs Lela-alem Gebreyohannes Tedla (since 2012)
- Jurisdiction: Ireland; Iceland
- Website: www.ethioembassy.ie

The Embassy of the Federal Democratic Republic of Ethiopia in Dublin is the diplomatic mission of Ethiopia in Ireland. When Ethiopia opened an embassy the first was located in Fitzwilliam street Lower. In 2011 the embassy was moved to 26 Upper Fitzwilliam Street. In 2018 they moved to Baggot street. In October 2021 the embassy was completely closed during Tigray war and COVID-19, but failed to reopen in 2022.

== Resident diplomatic missions ==
- Ethiopia is accredited to Ireland from its embassy in London, the United Kingdom.
- Ireland has an embassy in Addis Ababa.

== See also ==
- Foreign relations of Ethiopia
- Foreign relations of the Republic of Ireland
