= Denmark–Ireland relations =

- Denmark: Ireland

Diplomatic mission
- Embassy of Denmark, Dublin: Embassy of Ireland, Copenhagen

The relations between Denmark and Ireland have been described as "excellent", and the two countries enjoy strong trade and cultural ties. Denmark has an embassy in Dublin, and Ireland has an embassy in Copenhagen.

Diplomatic relations were established in January 1962 and both countries are members of the European Union since 1973. Cathaoirleach Mark Daly moreover described Denmark as a "valued friend of Ireland" during the Brexit process. Cultural ties date back to the Viking era.

Both countries claim Rockall.

== History ==
=== Vikings and Ireland ===
Irish poet Lady Wilde described the ties between the two countries in 1884 as:

Ireland and Denmark were connected together a thousand years ago by many ties, as our legends, history, and antiquities testify. Still, the two races remained entirely distinct, and fought and devastated and retaliated in many a fierce and cruel fashtion with inturing animosity and inextinguishable hatred. After much hard fighting, the Danes at length obtained a firm footing on the east coast, and Dublin… became exclusively a Danish city, where the powerful race of the Northmen ruled and reigned for nearly four hundred years.

She moreover stated that:

The Danes were the most terrible and ungodly of pagans when they first came to our shores; but through the influence of the Irish saints and holy men of the Church they were gradually Christianized, and evinced their zeal by founding new churches… The first cathedral in Dublin, Christchurch was built by the Danes, and a Danish bishop first held the see.

=== Modern relations ===
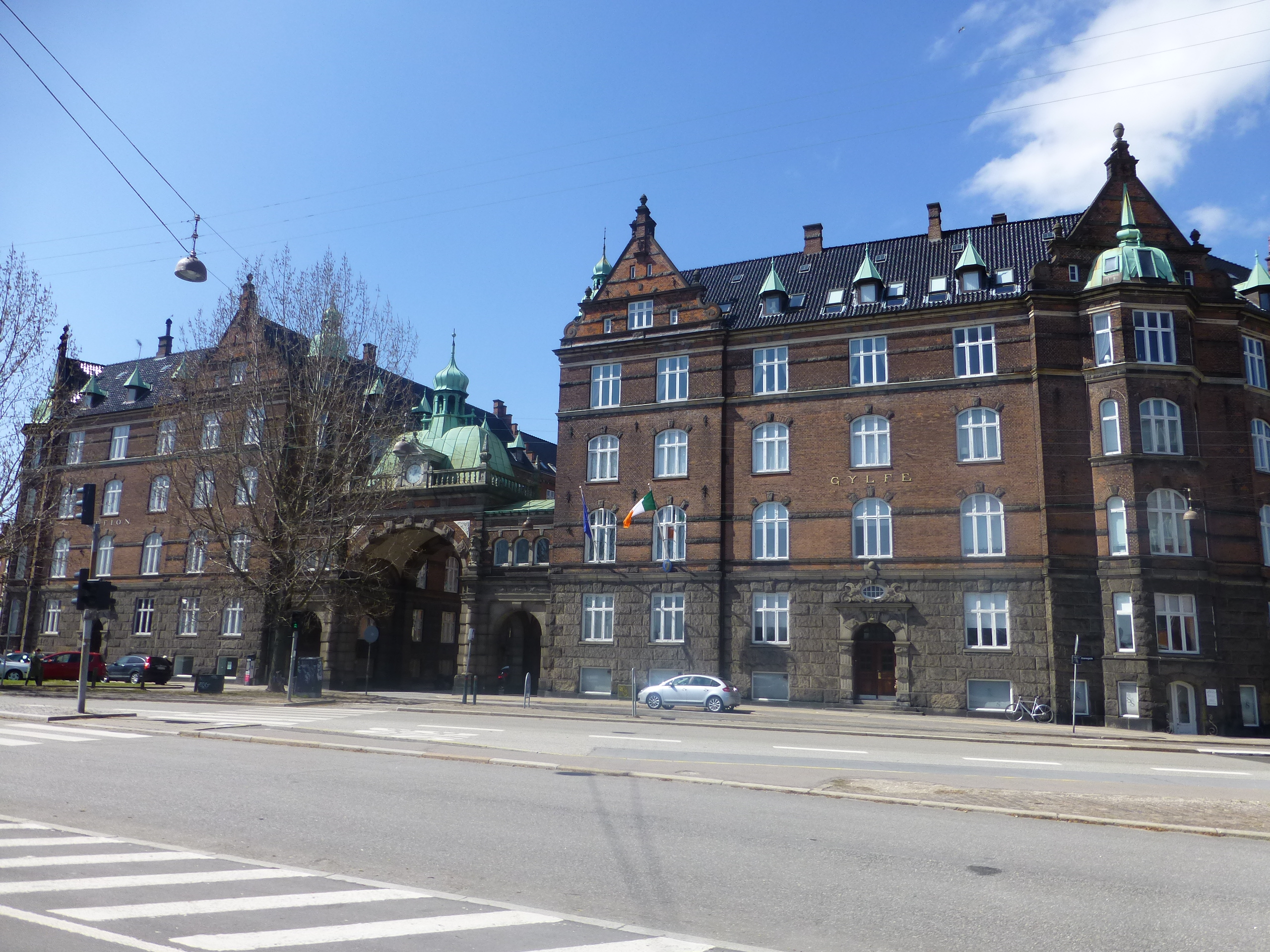
The Gylfe building has been home to the Irish embassy in Copenhagen since the 1980s.

An air transport treaty was signed in 1947, between both countries. Irish Minister of Agriculture Thomas Walsh visited Denmark in 1953.

Diplomatic relations were only established in 1962 because of budgetary reasons on the side of the Irish and the Irish policy of minimum diplomatic relations, due to indifference to diplomatic relations except with the United Kingdom. After establishing relations, the Irish ambassador in Amsterdam was accredited to Denmark until 1972 when an embassy opened in Copenhagen. Ireland had a Chargé d'affaires in Denmark from 1962 to 1972. Conversely, Denmark opened an embassy in Dublin in 1973.

The first Irish president to visit Denmark was Patrick Hillery in 1983 when he was accompanied by Foreign Minister Peter Barry on a state visit. In 2010, President Mary McAleese visited Denmark to explore and promote trade and cultural relations, while Prime Minister Leo Varadkar visited Copenhagen in 2019 to discuss Brexit and climate policy.

On the Danish side, Prime Minister Anders Fogh Rasmussen travelled to Dublin in 2002 to discuss the upcoming referendum on the treaty of Nice with Irish authorities, as Denmark had the EU presidency at the time.

== See also ==
- Foreign relations of Denmark
- Foreign relations of the Republic of Ireland
