= Germany–Ireland relations =

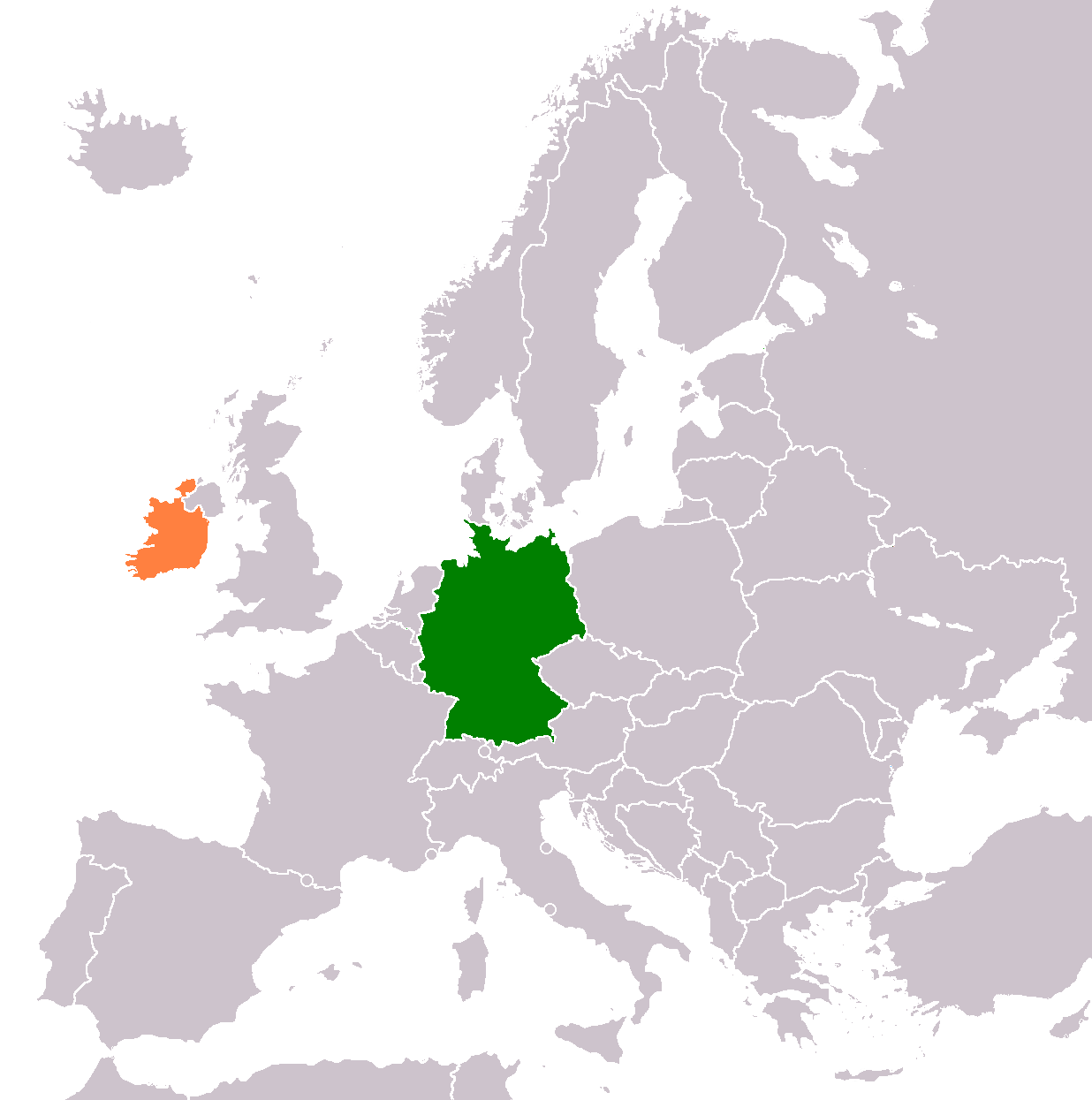

- Germany: Ireland

Germany and Ireland are both members of the European Union and the Eurozone. Relations between the two countries have been described, in 2011 by Ruairí Quinn, then Irish Minister for Education: "Ireland and Germany have enjoyed an excellent long-standing political and economic relationship, and culture, mutual trust and common values have always been at the core of our relations", going to on add further that "When the first hydro-electric Shannon scheme was established, it was a very deliberate decision, a very cultural assertion of separation from London, to invite Siemens to provide technical assistance."

== History ==
The Christian missionary activity of Irish monks independent of Rome between the 6th and 8th centuries is called the Hiberno-Scottish mission. This also strongly influenced the German-speaking areas. Columbanus of Luxeuil and St. Gallus, for example, were active in the Lake Constance region. Saint Kilian is said to have preached in Würzburg and the surrounding area. (The German-Irish Society of Würzburg has existed there since 1986.) Virgil of Salzburg, on the other hand, was active as a bishop in Salzburg. The second phase of the Iro-Scottish missionary work was closely connected with the Irish work in the Benedictine Scottish monasteries. Their origin went back to the Irish Marianus Scotus, who appeared with companions in Regensburg in 1070 and founded an ascetic monastic community, from which several monasteries were founded. The relatively large geographical distance caused German-Irish relations to be also later often concentrated on important individuals. For example, the commander-in-chief of the imperial forces in the Thirty Years' War, Albrecht von Wallenstein, was assassinated in 1634 in Eger by the Irish captain Walter Deveroux. In all, quite a few Irish soldiers fought in the German theatres of war of that period.

In later warfare during the Jacobite uprisings, the German-born army commander Friedrich von Schomberg fell in the Battle of the Boyne in eastern Ireland in 1690. The German Richard Cassels (1690-1751) worked as a successful architect in Ireland, while the Dublin-born William Thomas Mulvany (1806-1885) earned great merit in the Industrialisation of the Ruhr.

Lola Montez (real name Elizabeth Rosanna Gilbert, born in Grange, Ireland) became the "catalyst" of the 1848 revolution in Bavaria through her relationship with King Ludwig I of Bavaria. In the 19th century, Celtic studies established itself as a scientific discipline in the German-speaking world. This also influenced the awakening of Irish national consciousness at a time when the country was part of the United Kingdom of Great Britain and Ireland. There were repeated protests and uprisings against British rule during the period.

In 1914, the passage of the Irish Home Rule Bill by the British House of Commons could no longer be prevented by the opponents of Irish autonomy, but the outbreak of World War I delayed its enforcement initially to 1915, as the war was expected to be short. (No Home Rule Bill was implemented until 1920.) Many of the members of the Ulster Volunteer Force and the Irish Volunteers joined the British Army during the war, quite often for Irish political considerations. They fought against the German Empire and its allies primarily on the Western Front, at the Battle of Gallipoli and in the Middle East. It is believed that 30,000 to 50,000 Irish died during the war.

As part of the preparations for the Easter Rising against the British in 1916, the Germans, following the motto "the enemy of my enemy is my friend", had agreed to transport Irish prisoners of war who had agreed to rise in Ireland and to land some 40,000 French and Russian looted rifles in Ireland by relief ship on Good Friday. The captured English ship SS Libau would be dispatched under the guise of Norwegian vessel Aud to land the arms, but would fail because the location and the time were not well coordinated; likewise, the entire rebellion would also fail.

However, the massive British repression against the insurgents created widespread anti-British attitudes among the Irish population and led to popularization of the idea of Irish independence. The ensuing Irish War of Independence (1919-1921) led to the Anglo-Irish Treaty in 1921, which guaranteed independence from Britain for 26 of the 32 Irish counties (except Northern Ireland).

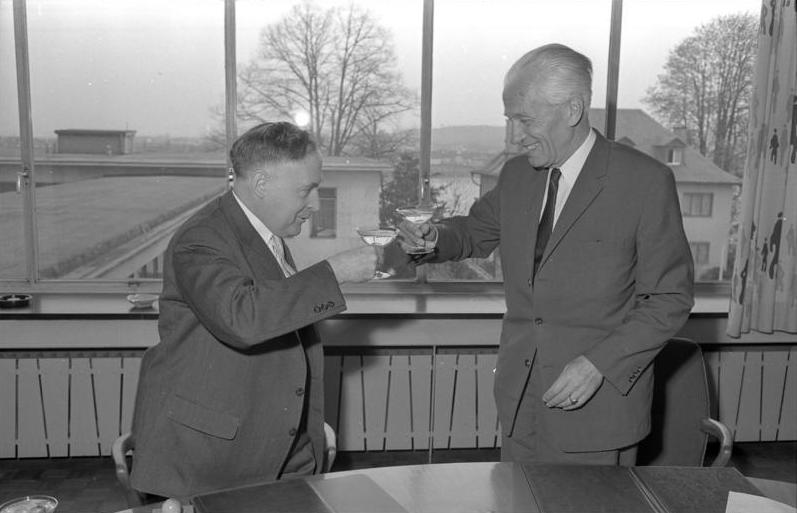
Irish Ambassador William Warnock with the German Foreign Ministry official Dr. Heß, after signing a trade agreement in 1961

Ireland remained neutral during World War II. Germany had an ambassador in the country, Eduard Hempel, until 1945. De facto, however, there was intelligence and military cooperation of Ireland with the western enemies of the Third Reich: the United Kingdom and the United States. Éamon de Valera was the only head of government in the world to condole with the German embassy after Adolf Hitler's suicide in 1945. He later protested to the British embassy about the death sentences imposed on the main war criminals during the Nuremberg trials.

In 1973, the country joined the European Economic Community, the predecessor of the European Union. After considerable adjustment difficulties, the following years saw a sustained economic upswing, largely by European structural funding, with Germany as one of the main net contributors. In 1990, Ireland, as holder of the presidency of the Council of the European Communities, now the Council of the European Union, actively supported the completion of German reunification.

In 1999, the euro was introduced in Ireland as a digital currency, followed by cash in 2002. The joint membership of Ireland and Germany in the European Union has intensified relations between both states in recent decades. In 2011, the publication of plans by the Irish government to increase value-added tax in the German Bundestag, before the plans had been communicated in Ireland itself, caused disgruntlement in Ireland. That was painfully perceived by many Irish as a loss of sovereignty by Ireland in the context of the Irish debt crisis toward of the European Union, especially Germany.

== Overview ==
- As Ireland was neutral during World War II, it was able to maintain diplomatic relations with Germany throughout the war. Nonetheless, at least one Irish merchant vessel was destroyed by a German submarine
- Germany has an embassy in Dublin and two honorary consulates (in Cork and Galway).
- Ireland has an embassy in Berlin and consulate-generals in Frankfurt and Munich and honorary consulates (in Bergisch Gladbach and Hamburg).
- Both countries are full members of the European Union and of the Council of Europe.
- Germany is one of Ireland's largest trading partners and ranked third in 2014, at approximately 8% of Ireland's total foreign trade.
- There are approximately 11,305 Germans living in Ireland.
- Irish Journal is the title of a semi-documentary travelogue written by Heinrich Böll in 1957.
- The Irish pub is a popular and widespread form of gastronomy in Germany.

== See also ==
- Foreign relations of Germany
- Foreign relations of Ireland
