= Chile–Ireland relations =

Foreign relations between Chile and Ireland

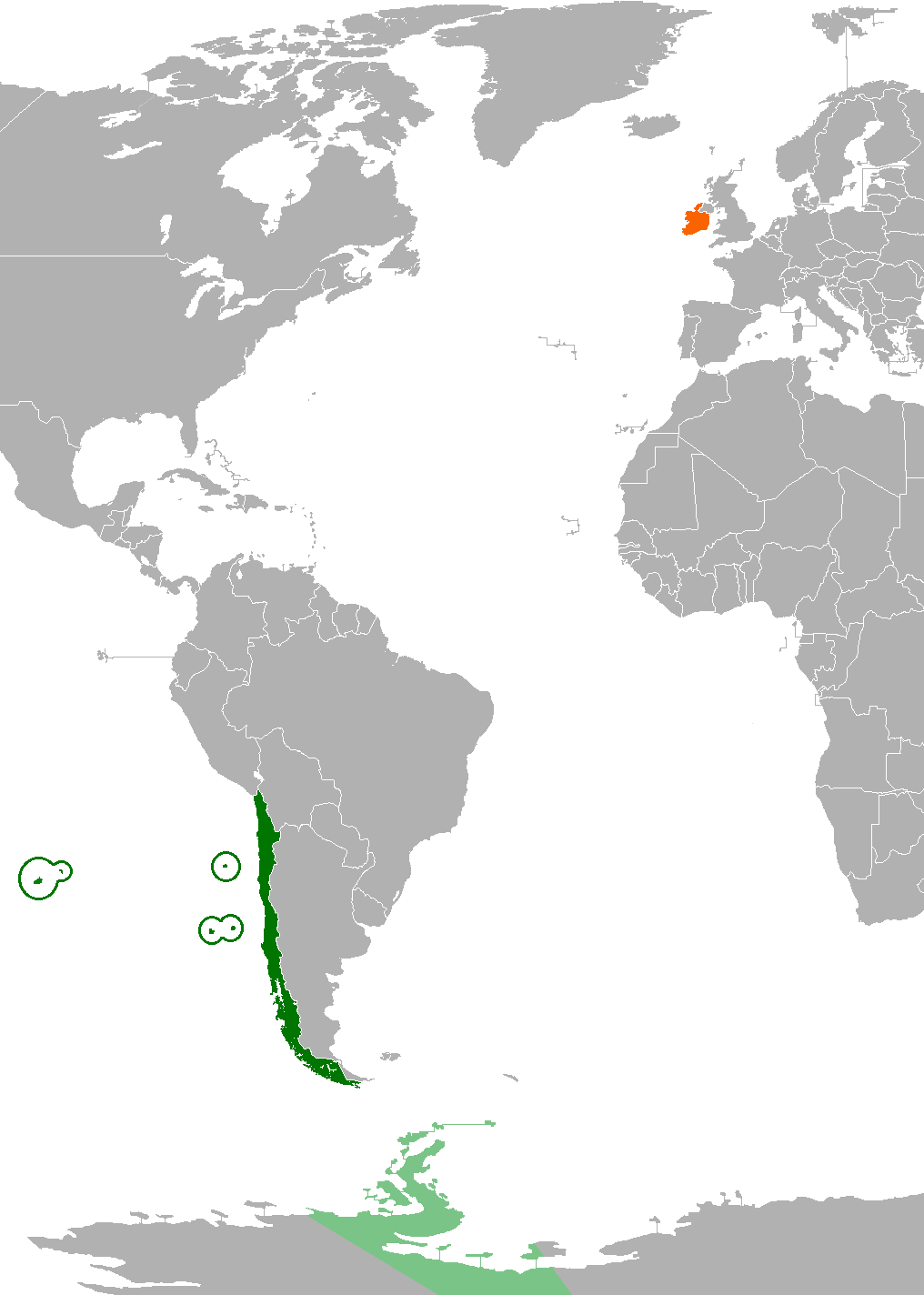

- Chile: Ireland

Chile–Ireland relations are foreign relations between Chile and Ireland. Both nations are members of the Organisation for Economic Co-operation and Development and the United Nations.

== History ==
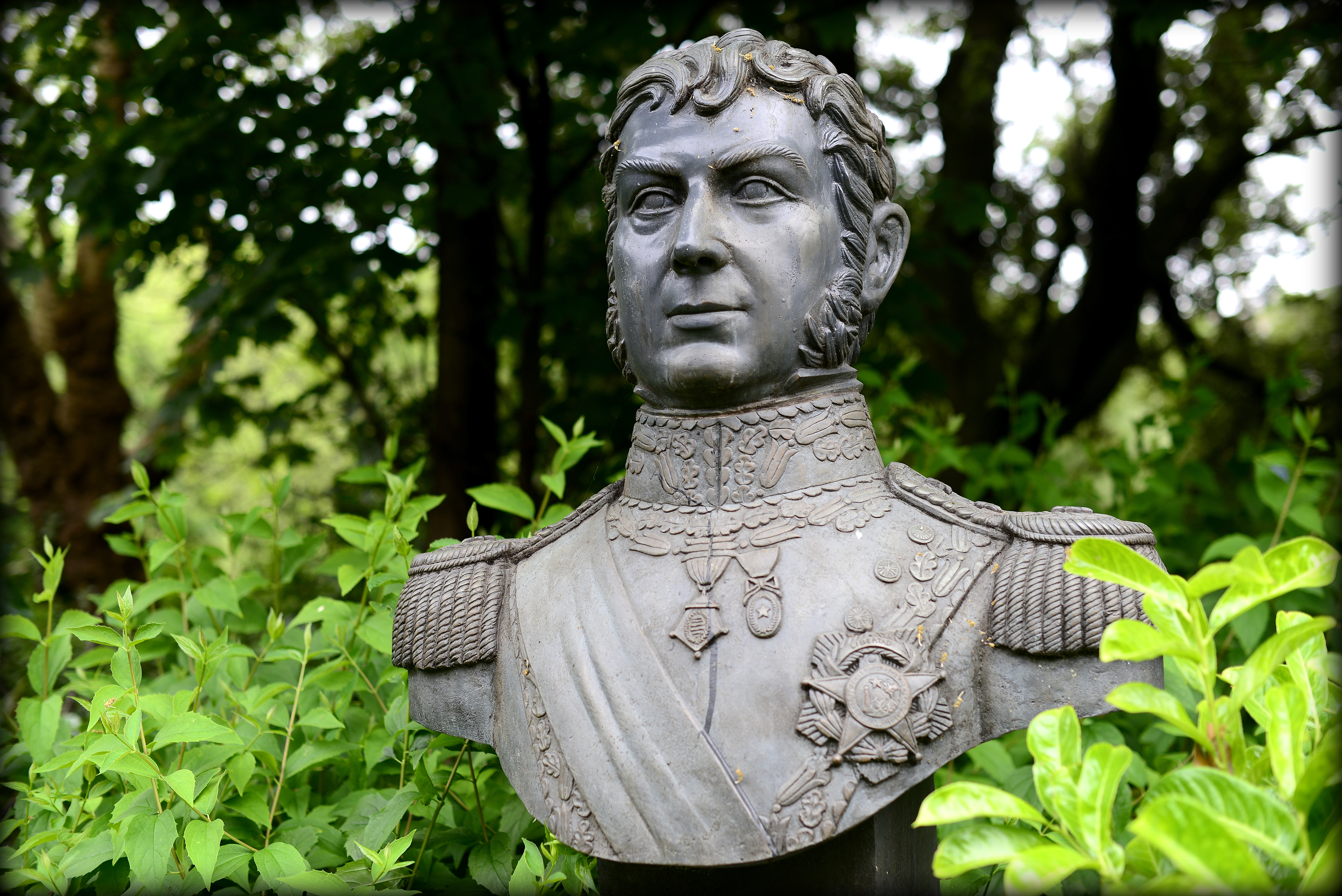
Bust of Chilean Liberator, Bernardo O'Higgins in Dublin, Ireland

The first Irish to arrive to present day Chile may have been part of a contingent of Irish soldiers who left Ireland to serve in primarily Catholic countries and were known as "Wild Geese". Irish soldiers made up part of the Spanish entourage during their conquering and colonizing of Chile in the 1500s. In 1763, Irish-born nobleman Ambrosio O'Higgins arrived to Chile under the service of Spain. From 1788 to 1796, Ambrosio became the Royal Governor of Chile and later was promoted to Viceroy of Peru (which included Chile) from 1796 to 1801. In 1778, Ambrosio's son, Bernardo O'Higgins was born in Chillán. Bernardo would later be known as Chile's independence leader and Supreme Director of and independent Chile from 1817 to 1823. Irish-born Chilean military officer Juan Mackenna is also considered a hero of Chilean Independence and is accredited for creating the Corps of Military Engineers of the Chilean Army.

Soon after the Irish War of Independence from the United Kingdom, Ireland began to develop its diplomatic relations with Latin America and sent at first Irish Republic Representative Frank W. Egan and later Patrick Little in 1921 to Chile to help raise funds from prominent Irish families in the country for Ireland.

From 1973 to 1990, Chile entered a military dictatorship run by General Augusto Pinochet. During this time period, many Chileans citizens who were against the government sought asylum in other countries, including Ireland where approx. 120 Chilean citizens applied for asylum. In 1988, future Irish President Michael D. Higgins arrived to Chile as an international election observer during the Chilean national plebiscite. In 1990, the first democratically elected President of Chile since before the military dictatorship was President Patricio Aylwin of Irish descent. In the early 1990s, both Chile and Ireland established diplomatic relations and in 2002, Chile opened its first resident embassy in the Irish capital. In 2019, Ireland opened its first resident embassy in Santiago.

== High-level visits ==
High-level visits from Chile to Ireland

- President Ricardo Lagos (2003)

High-level visits from Ireland to Chile

- President Mary Robinson (1995)
- President Mary McAleese (2004)
- President Michael D. Higgins (2012)

== Bilateral agreements ==
In 2005, Chile and Ireland signed an Agreement on the Avoidance of Double Taxation. In 2016, a Working holiday visa Agreement was signed by both nations.

== Trade ==
In 2002, Chile signed a free trade agreement with the European Union (which includes Ireland). In 2017, trade between Chile and Ireland totaled €400 million Euros. Chile's main export products to Ireland include: Chilean wine; food and live animals; chemicals and related products. Ireland's main exports to Chile include: machinery and transport equipment; insurance; computer and information services; and alcohol.

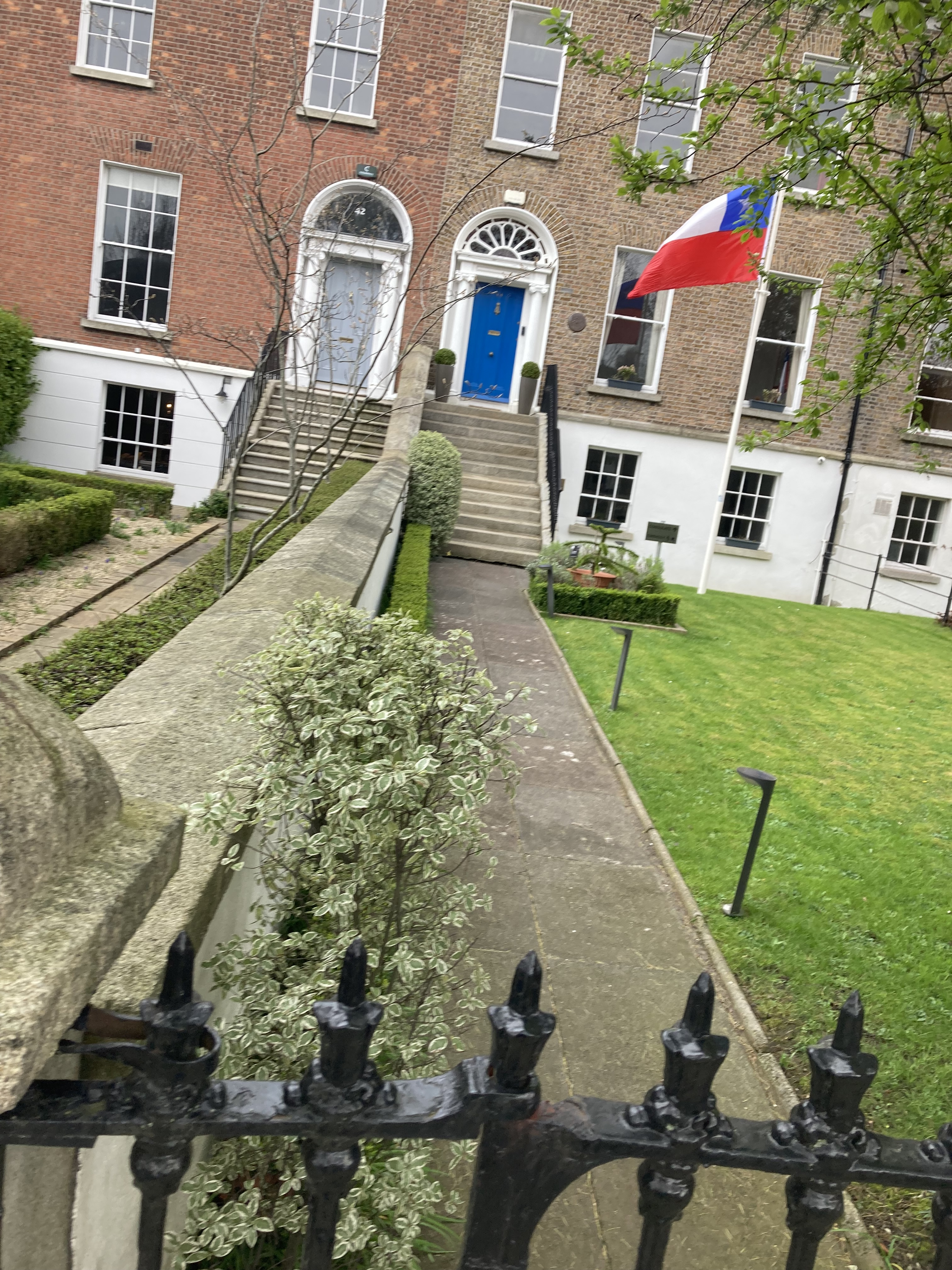
Embassy of Chile in Dublin

== Resident diplomatic missions ==
- Chile has an embassy in Dublin.
- Ireland has an embassy in Santiago.

== Diaspora ==
Approximately 120,000 Chileans nationals are of Irish origin.

== See also ==
- Foreign relations of Chile
- Foreign relations of Ireland
