= Muhamet Hamiti =

Kosovar diplomat (born 1964)

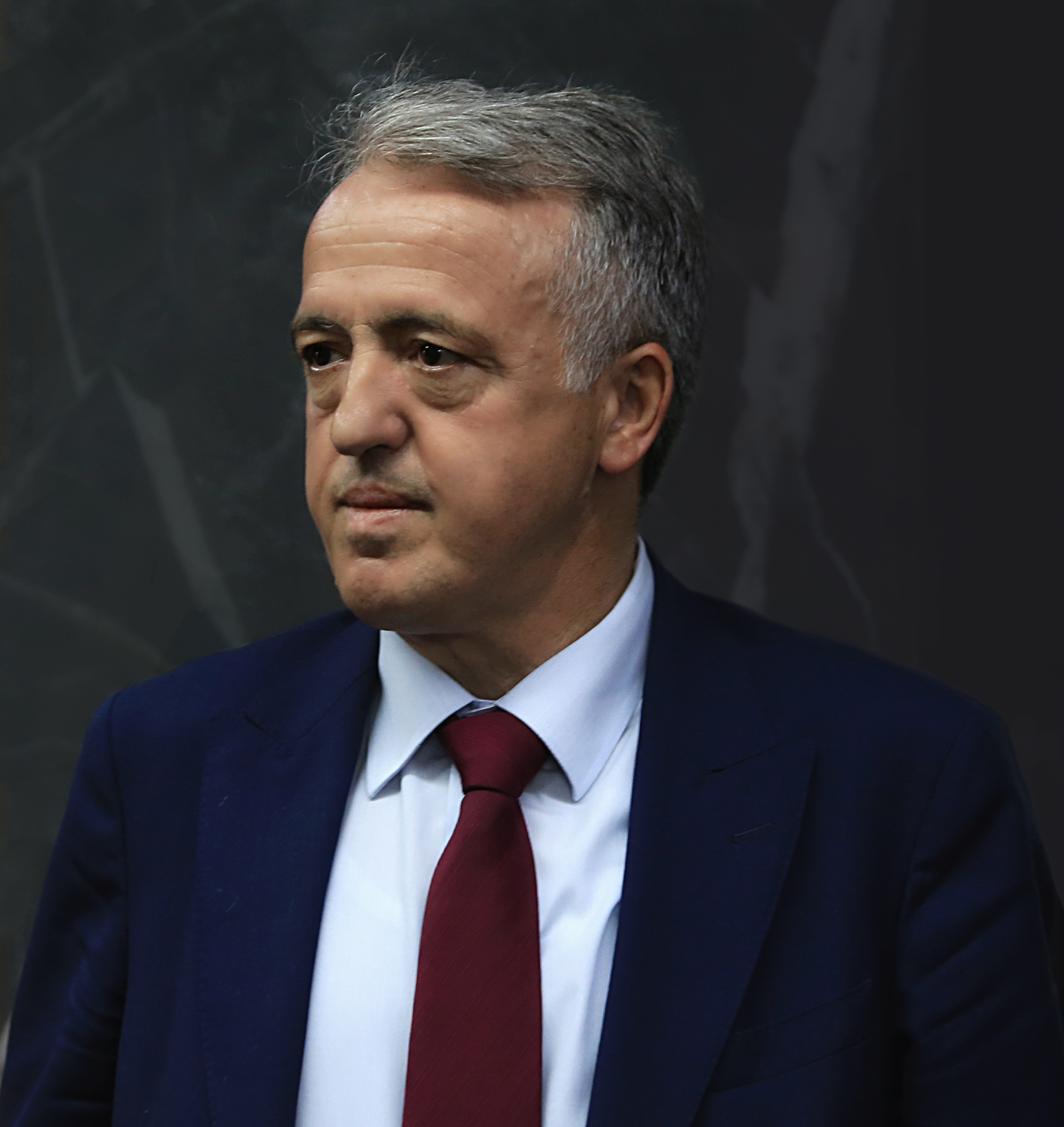
- Muhamet Hamiti
- Born: 1964 (age 61–62); Podujevo, SAP Kosovo, SFR Yugoslavia
- Occupation: Ambassador
- Years active: 2008-2013

Muhamet Hamiti (born 1964) is a Kosovar politician, formerly an advisor to the former President of Kosovo, Ibrahim Rugova. He was the first ambassador of the Republic of Kosovo to the United Kingdom, from 2008 to 2012.

== Career ==
Hamiti was born in the Podujevo municipality of Kosovo in 1964. He earned his BA in English language and literature at the University of Pristina in 1987; earned his MA in English literature at the Zagreb University (in Croatia) in 1990, and his PhD in English literature at the University of Pristina in 2006.

In the 1990s, Hamiti was an independent scholar at the University of East Anglia and at Birkbeck College, University of London, respectively, pursuing research in and studies of literature.

He taught English literature at the University of Pristina from 1989 until 2008 as an assistant, lecturer, assistant professor and from 2013 to 2022 as an associate professor. He is author of a monograph book on English literature, a range of literary essays, as well as literary translations from and into English.

From 1991 through 1999 he worked at the Kosovo Information Center (KIC) – Qendra për Informim e Kosovës, QIK – as editor-in-chief for the English service. He edited and translated into English a number of publications that KIC undertook during those years of the Kosovar's struggle for freedom and independence.

Muhamet Hamiti is a member of the Democratic League of Kosovo (LDK) since 1990, and a member of LDK's executive body since 2002.

Muhamet Hamiti was a media advisor and spokesman to the President of Kosovo, Ibrahim Rugova, from mid-2002 through January 2006, when he died of cancer.

In February 2006, Muhamet Hamiti was appointed a senior political advisor to Rugova's successor to the Presidency of Kosovo, Fatmir Sejdiu.

From 2006 to 2012, he served as ambassador to the United Kingdom. He was also non-resident Ambassador to New Zealand and Ireland.
