= List of diplomatic missions in Dublin =

This is a list of the 71 resident embassies in Dublin. For other diplomatic missions in Ireland, see List of diplomatic missions in Ireland.

== Embassies ==
Sending country	Mission	Opened	Place	Address	Photo
Algeria	Embassy	2020	Ballsbridge	80 Northumberland Road	
Argentina	Embassy	1947	Donnybrook	15 Ailesbury Drive	
Australia	Embassy	1946 (Note: Full embassy opened in 1964)	St. Stephens Green	47–49 St Stephens Green	
Austria	Embassy	1966	Merrion	6 Ailesbury Road	
Bangladesh	Embassy	2026			
Barbados	Embassy	2024	Merrion Square	114 Baggot Street Lower	
Belgium	Embassy	1959	Ballsbridge	1 Elgin Road	
Brazil	Embassy	1991	Donnybrook	Donnybrook House 36-42 Donnybrook Road	-
Bulgaria	Embassy	2004	Ballsbridge	22 Burlington Road	
Canada	Embassy	1939	Fitzwilliam	7/8 Wilton Terrace	
Chile	Embassy	2002	Ballsbridge	44 Wellington Road	
China	Embassy	1980	Donnybrook	40 Aleisbury Road	
Colombia	Embassy	2018	Ballsbridge	29 Fitzwilliam Place	
Croatia	Embassy	1995	St. Patrick's Cathedral	Adelaide Chambers, Peter Street	
Cuba	Embassy	2001	Dublin Pearse	32B Westland Square, Pearse Street	
Cyprus	Embassy	2003	Fitzwilliam	14 Fitzwilliam Place	
Czech Republic	Embassy	1995	Ballsbridge	57 Northumberland Road	
Denmark	Embassy	1979	Harcourt	7th Floor, Block E, Iveagh Court	
Egypt	Embassy	1978	Ballsbridge	12 Clyde Road	
Estonia	Embassy	2003	Harcourt	3rd Floor, Block E, Iveagh Court	
Finland	Embassy	1989	St. Stephen's Green	Russell House, Stokes Place	-
France	Embassy	1929 (Note: opened full embassy in 1950)	Merrion Square	66 Merrion Square	
Georgia	Embassy	2010	Donnybrook	17 Morehampton Road	
Germany	Embassy	1930 (Note: closed from 1945 to 1954)	Blackrock	31 Trimleston Avenue	
Greece	Embassy	1977	Fitzwilliam	1 Upper Pembroke Street	
Holy See	Apostolic Nunciature	1929	Phoenix Park	183 Navan Road	-
Hungary	Embassy	1991	Fitzwilliam	2 Fitzwilliam Place	
India	Embassy	1951	Merrion	69 Merrion Road	
Iran	Embassy	1983	Blackrock	72 Mount Merrion Avenue	
Iraq	Embassy	2023	Fitzwilliam	8 Fitzwilliam Place	
Italy	Embassy	1937	Ballsbridge	63 Northumberland Road	
Japan	Embassy	1964	Merrion	Nutley Building, Merrion Centre	
Kenya	Embassy	2007	Ballsbridge	11 Elgin Road	
Kuwait	Embassy	2023	Charlemont	One Grand Parade	-
Latvia	Embassy	2003	Fitzwilliam	23 Fitzwilliam Place	
Lesotho	Embassy	2004	Fitzwilliam	66 Baggot Street Lower	
Lithuania	Embassy	2004	Donnybrook	47 Ailesbury Road	
Luxembourg	Embassy	2022	Dublin 4	17 Mespil Road	
Malaysia	Embassy	2001	Ballsbridge	5A, Shelbourne House, Shelbourne Road	
Malta	Embassy	2005	St. Stephen's Green	15 Leeson Street Lower	
Mexico	Embassy	1991	Ballsbridge	19 Raglan Road	
Moldova	Embassy	2019	Merrion Square	2 Upper Mount Street	
Morocco	Embassy	1992	Ballsbridge	39 Raglan Road	
Netherlands	Embassy	1961	Merrion	160 Merrion Road	
New Zealand	Embassy	2018	St. Stephen's Green	Level 3, 2–4 Merrion Row	
Nigeria	Embassy	1963	Ranelagh	56 Leeson Park	
Norway	Embassy	1983	Merrion Square	48–53 Mount Street Lower	
Pakistan	Embassy	2001	Ballsbridge	14 Clyde Road	
Palestine	Embassy	2024	Fitzwilliam	8 Upper Leeson Street	
Peru	Embassy	2017	Fitzwilliam	46 Fitzwilliam Square West	
Philippines	Embassy	2009 (Note: Closed between 2012 and 2024)	Merrion Square	37 Mount Street Upper	-
Poland	Embassy	1991	Merrion	5 Ailesbury Road	
Portugal	Embassy	1951	Donnybrook	70 Upper Leeson Street	
Romania	Embassy	1994	Ballsbridge	26 Waterloo Road	
Russia	Embassy	1973	Dartry	184–186 Orwell Road	-
Saudi Arabia	Embassy	2009	Fitzwilliam	12 Fitzwilliam Square East	
Sierra Leone	Embassy	2025	Merrion Square	14 Lower Mount Street	
Slovakia	Embassy	1997	Merrion Square	80 Merrion Square	
Slovenia	Embassy	2002 (Note: Closed from 2012 to 2020)	Merrion Square	12 Mount Street Upper	
South Africa	Embassy	1996	St. Stephen's Green	2nd Floor, Alexandra House, Earlsfort Centre, Earlsfort Terrace	
South Korea	Embassy	1987	Merrion Square	72 Merrion Square South	
Spain	Embassy	1935	Merrion	17A Merlyn Park	
Sudan	Embassy	2016	Fitzwilliam	72 Haddington Road	
Sweden	Embassy	1946 (Note: closed in 2010 reopened in 2023)	Kildress	Kildress House Floor 2 Kildress Road	
Switzerland	Embassy	1954	Merrion	6 Ailesbury Road	
Turkey	Embassy	1973	Ballsbridge	No 8 Raglan Road	
Ukraine	Embassy	2003	Ballsbridge	16 Elgin Road	
United Arab Emirates	Embassy	2010	Ballsbridge	45–47 Pembroke Road	
United Kingdom	Embassy	1923	Ballsbridge	29 Merrion Road	
United States	Embassy	1927	Ballsbridge	42 Raglan Road	
Vietnam	Embassy	2025	Ballsbridge	52 Northumberland Road	

== Other Missions ==
Sending country	Mission	Opened	Place	Address	Photo
Republic of China (Taiwan)	Taipei Representative Office	1989	Fitzwilliam	8 Hatch Street Lower	

== Official Residences ==
Sending country	Address	Photo
Algeria	184 Rathgar Road	-
Argentina	31 Whitebeam Avenue	-
Australia	Killiney Hill road	-
Austria	77 Ailesbury Road	-
Barbados		-
Belgium	46 Ailesbury Road	-
Brazil	41 Wellington Road	-
Bulgaria	Glenamuck Road	-
Canada	22 Oakley Road	-
Chile	77 Wellington Road	-
China	6 Raglan Road	-
Colombia		-
Croatia	68 Morehampton Road	-
Cuba	319 Orwell Park Glen	-
Cyprus	3 Shrewsbury Road	-
Czech Republic		-
Denmark	4 Argyle Road	-
Egypt	Brennanstown Road	-
Estonia		-
Finland	17 Shrewsbury Road	-
France	53 Ailesbury Road	-
Georgia		-
Germany	4 Nutley Road	-
Greece	Marino Avenue West	-
Hungary	32 Leeson Park	-
India	Knocksinna	-
Iran		-
Iraq		-
Israel		-
Italy	Lucan House	-
Japan	Brighton Road	-
Kenya	Kerrymount Avenue	-
Kuwait		-
Latvia		-
Lesotho		-
Lithuania		-
Luxembourg	26 Palmerston Park	-
Malaysia	16A Raglan Lane	-
Malta		-
Mexico	13 Leeson Park	-
Moldova		-
Morocco	Otranto Place	-
Netherlands	5 Brighton Road	-
New Zealand		-
Nigeria	15 Temple Road	-
Norway	48 Ailesbury Road	-
Pakistan		-
Palestine		-
Peru		-
Philippines		-
Poland	12 Ailesbury Road	-
Portugal	Knocksinna	-
Romania		-
Russia	75 Ailesbury Road	-
Saudi Arabia		-
Slovakia		-
Slovenia		-
South Africa	16 Ailesbury Road	-
South Korea	Brennanstown Road	-
Spain	Ailesbury Road	-
Sudan		-
Sweden		-
Switzerland		-
Turkey		-
Ukraine		-
United Arab Emirates		-
United Kingdom	Woodward Avenue	-
United States	Acres Road	-

== Former Missions ==
Sending country	Mission	Opened	Closed	Place	Address	Current Accreditation	Photo
Ethiopia	Embassy	2003	2021	Fitzwilliam	93 Baggot Street Lower	London	
Ghana	Embassy	2008	2009	Ballsbridge	13 Clyde Road	London	-
Israel	Embassy	1996	2024	Ballsbridge	Fifth Floor, 23 Shelbourne Road	Jerusalem	

== Honorary consulates ==
Sending country	Mission	Place	Address	Diplomatic relations handled by mission in	Photo
Armenia	Honorary Consul	Sutton	8 Sutton Castle	London	-
Azerbaijan	Honorary Consul	Fitzwilliam	93 Baggot street	London	-
Belize	Honorary Consul	The Point	Ulysses House Foley Street	London	-
Cameroon	Honorary Consul	Castleknock	21 Castleknock Lodge	London	-
Timor-Leste	Honorary Consul	Ballyfermot	210 La Fanu Road	Lisbon	-
Ghana	Honorary Consul	Ballsbridge	74 Haddington Road	London	-
Iceland	Honorary Consul	Dun Laoghaire	21 Carnegie Drive	London	-
Indonesia	Honorary Consul	Dundrum	13 Classon House Dundrum Business Park	London	-
Ivory Coast	Honorary Consul	Adamstown	16 Stratton Walk	London	-
Jamaica	Honorary Consul	Caslteknock	8 Homeleige Porterstown	London	-
Jordan	Honorary Consul	Ballsbridge	84 Ardoyne Road Pembroke Road	London	-
Oman	Honorary Consul	Dalkey	9A Dalkey Avenue	London	-
San Marino	Honorary Consul	Donnycarney	23 Howth Road	San Marino	-
Serbia	Honorary Consul	Rathfarmhan	12 Hermitage Lawn	London	-
Singapore	Honorary Consul	Fitzwilliam	26 Fitzwilliam Square	London	-
Thailand	Honorary Consul	Nangor Road	Unit 43 Parkwest O’Casey Ave	London	-
Tunisia	Honorary Consul	Rathfanham	26 Crannagh Road	London	-
Uganda	Honorary Consul	Terenure	17 Rathfarnhan Road	London	-
Uruguay	Honorary Consul	Donabate	36 The Drive Semple Woods	London	-
Vietnam	Honorary Consul	St. Stephen's Green	5 St. Stephen's Green	London	-

== See also ==
List of diplomatic missions in Ireland
