= Joseph Walsh =

Joseph or Joe Walsh may refer to:

== Public officials ==
- Joseph Charles Walsh (1868–1960), Canadian lawyer, judge, journalist and legislator from Quebec
- Joseph Walsh (Massachusetts politician) (1875–1946), American jurist and congressman, 1915–1922
- Joseph T. Walsh (1930–2014), American jurist from Delaware
- Joe Walsh (Irish politician) (1943–2014), Irish legislator and cabinet member
- Joe Walsh (Illinois politician) (born 1961), American congressman

== Sportsmen ==
- Joe Walsh (AA infielder) (1864–1911), American baseball shortstop/second baseman
- Joe Walsh (catcher) (1886–1967), American baseball catcher
- Joe Walsh (NL infielder) (1917–1996), American baseball shortstop
- Joseph Walsh (rugby league) (1944–2008), English footballer at wing for Leigh and Great Britain
- Joe Walsh (rugby league, born 1988), English rugby league player for Huddersfield Giants
- Joe Walsh (Australian rugby league) (1945/1946–2025)
- Joe Walsh (footballer, born 1992), Welsh footballer for Lincoln City
- Joe Walsh (rugby union) (born 1993), New Zealand rugby union player for Blues and Southland
- Joe Walsh (footballer, born 2002), English football goalkeeper for Queens Park Rangers
- Joey Walsh (rugby league) (born 2006), Australian halfback for the Manly Sea Eagles

== Others ==
- Joseph Walsh (bishop) (1888–1972), Irish Roman Catholic prelate
- Joseph L. Walsh (1895–1973), American mathematician
- Joe Walsh (born 1947), American singer, songwriter and guitarist
- Joseph Walsh (designer) (born 1979), Irish designer and furniture maker

== See also ==
- Walsh (surname)
- Joseph Walshe (1886–1956), Irish Minister for Foreign Affairs
- Joseph N. Welch (1890–1960), American lawyer in Army–McCarthy hearings
