= Faye Toogood =

British artist and designer (born 1977)

Faye Toogood MBE
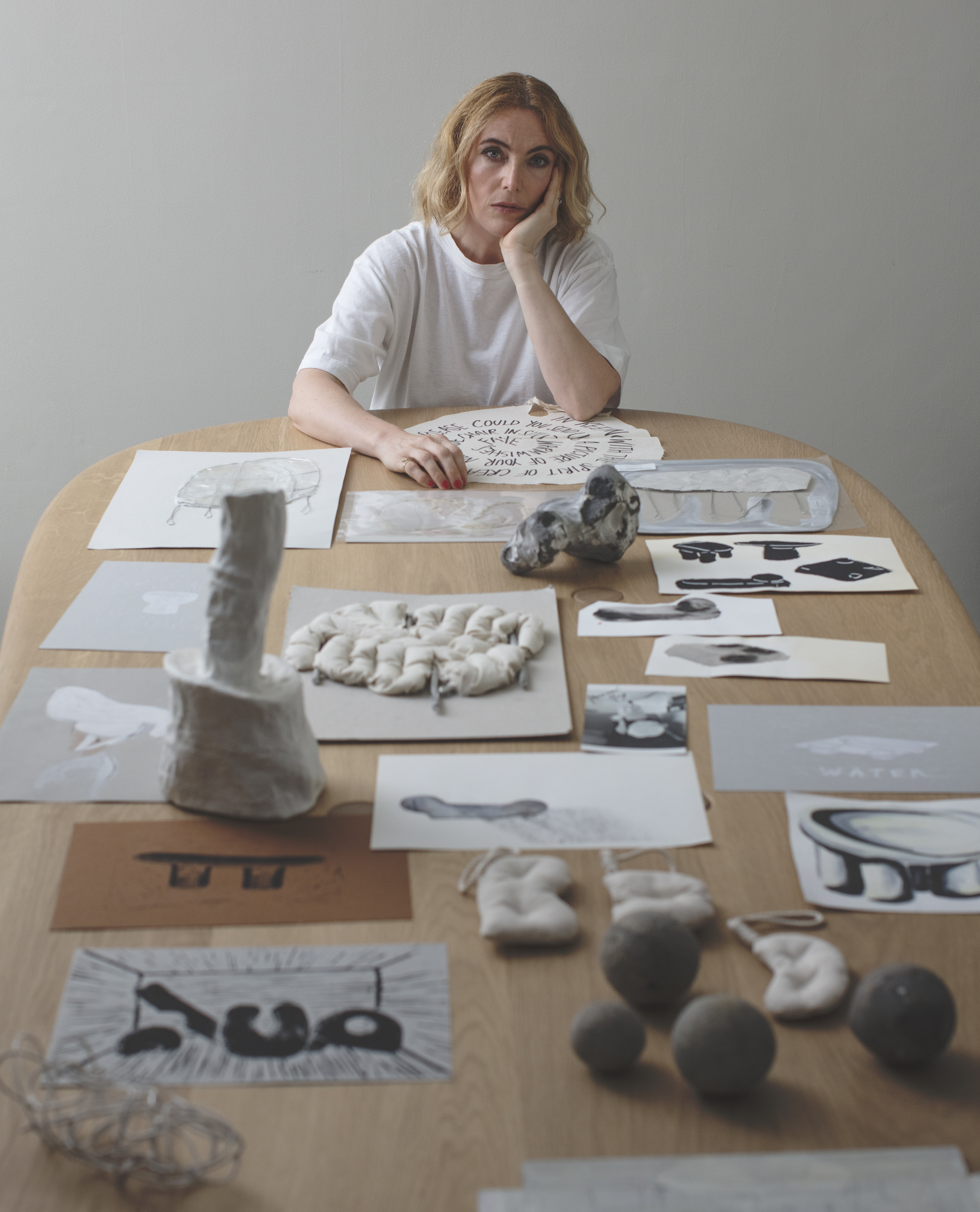
- Toogood pictured in 2026
- Born: 1977
- Education: University of Bristol
- Notable work: Roly Poly Chair
- Partner: Matt Gibberd
- Website: fayetoogood.com

Faye Toogood (born 1977) is a British artist and designer. She is known for her minimal, sculptural furniture designs. Speaking about her work, she said that "the world doesn't necessarily need any more chairs, but if I'm going to do something, then I hope that it will help push down barriers".

== Work and career ==
Toogood is based in London and works internationally. After taking a degree in Art History at the University of Bristol, she worked as an editor and stylist at The World of Interiors before founding Studio Toogood in 2008. She has collaborated with companies such as Bitossi Ceramiche, Birkenstock, Carhartt, Driade, Hermès, Hem, and Poltrona Frau.

She is known for minimal, sculptural furniture designs such as the Roly-Poly Chair, a piece which is held in several museum collections. The chair consists of a scooped seat with four plinth legs. In recent years, Toogood has diversified her style, methodology and medium. Her 2020 exhibition Assemblage 6: Unlearning included maquettes to illustrate the process of developing her work.

Her practice is rooted in the shapes and materials of the English countryside, from gnarled oak trees to ancient standing stones. It resists categorisation and is driven by contradictions: soft and hard, practical and poetic, handmade and industrial. Toogood begins with a hands-on process making small models with simple materials such as cardboard and clay to test and rework form, before scaling up to the point of abstraction. Whether making a chair, a large-scale installation, or a piece of public art, the results often have a sense of playfulness and a directness of touch.

Toogood's work has been exhibited at the Milan Furniture Fair, London Design Festival, and other trade fairs. She has also been exhibited at the Victoria and Albert Museum and Somerset House in London, and international venues such as the National Theatre of Qatar in Doha, as well as a number of commercial art galleries. The Freidman Benda gallery in New York has held several solo exhibitions of her work, and she was included in the 2023 exhibition at Chatsworth House titled Mirror Mirror: Reflections on Design at Chatsworth. The exhibition, which was curated by Glenn Adamson, featured pieces by Toogood alongside works by artists and designers such as Michael Anastassiades, Andile Dyalvane, Joris Laarman, Ndidi Ekubia, Ettore Sottsass, Formafantasma, Max Lamb, Samuel Ross, Joseph Walsh, and Najla El Zein.

A monograph about her work, Faye Toogood: Drawing, Material, Sculpture, Landscape, was published by Phaidon Press in 2022.

=== The Roly Poly Chair ===
Among Toogood's most recognised works is her Roly Poly Chair, first created in 2014. It is a sculptural piece that has an exaggerated rounded form and is an example of Toogood's interest in objects that exist simultaneously as furniture and sculpture.

== Personal life ==
Toogood lives in Highgate, London, with her partner Matt Gibberd. They have also restored a 19th-century manor near Winchester.

== Museum collections ==
Her work is held in museum collections including:

- Baltimore Museum of Art
- Columbus Museum of Art
- Corning Museum of Glass
- Dallas Museum of Art
- Denver Art Museum
- High Museum of Art
- National Gallery of Victoria
- Philadelphia Museum of Art
- Rhode Island School of Design Museum
- Vitra Design Museum

== Selected solo exhibitions ==
- 2010: Assemblage 1: Supernatural, London Design Festival, London, UK
- 2011: Assemblage 2: Natura Morta, Salone del Mobile, Milan, Italy
- 2012: Assemblage 3: Delicate Interference, Phillips de Pury, London, UK, and New York, US
- 2012: 7 x 7, 7 Dials, London, UK
- 2012: La Cura, Salone del Mobile, Milan, Italy
- 2014: Assemblage 4: Roly Poly, Milan, Italy
- 2015: The Drawing Room, Somerset House, London, UK
- 2015: The Cloakroom, V&A, London, UK
- 2017: Assemblage 5: Earth, Moon, Friedman Benda, New York, US
- 2017: Family Busts, Family Triptych Tapestry and Tools for Life Mobile 2, Friedman Benda, New York, US
- 2020: Downtime, National Gallery of Victoria, Melbourne, Australia
- 2020: Assemblage 6: Unlearning, Friedman Benda, New York, US
- 2022: Clay Court, National Theatre, Doha, Qatar
- 2024: Assemblage 7: Lost and Found II, Friedman Benda, New York, US

== Publications ==
- O'Neill, Alistair; Toogood, Faye (2022). Faye Toogood: Drawing, Material, Sculpture, Landscape. Phaidon Press. ISBN 978-1-83866-404-6.
