= Irish embassy =

Irish embassy may refer to:

- List of diplomatic missions of Ireland
- List of diplomatic missions in Ireland
- the Irish language embassy on the Irish Wikipedia
