= Embassy of France, Dublin =

Diplomatic mission of the french republic in Ireland

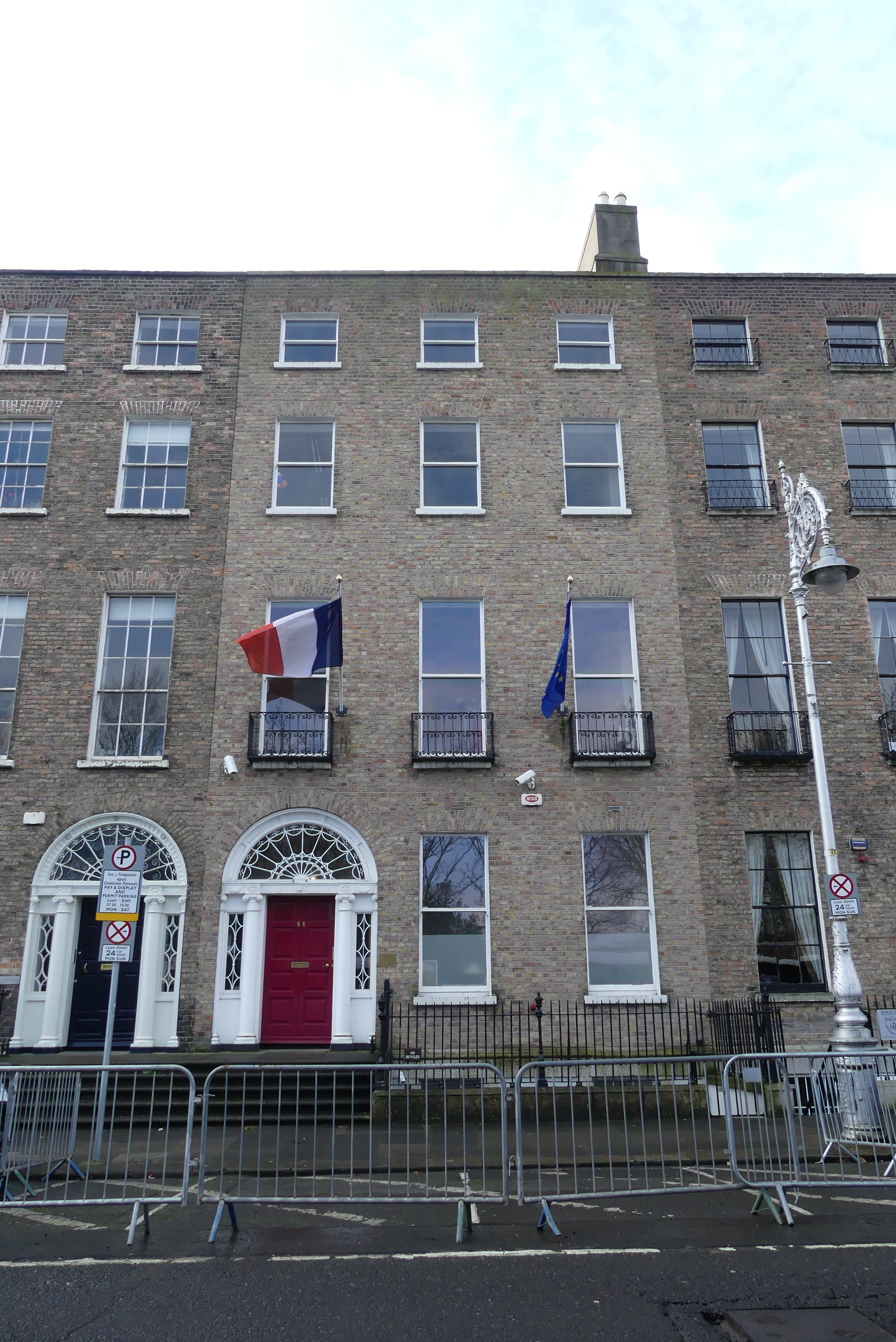
- Location: Merrion Square, Dublin
- Address: 66 Fitzwilliam Lane, Dublin, Ireland
- Coordinates: 53°20′19.34″N 6°14′58.27″W
- Ambassador: Céline Place
- Website: French Embassy, Ireland

The Embassy of France in Ireland (French: L'ambassade de France en Irlande) is the diplomatic mission of the French Republic in Ireland. It is located in Dublin.

As of January 2024, the current ambassador to Ireland is Céline Place. She was Deputy Director of the private office of the Minister for Europe and Foreign Affairs, Catherine Colonna (May 2022-January 2024). At the end of her post, she coordinated the international humanitarian aid conference for Sudan and neighbouring countries, which was held in Paris in April 2024.

She had previously held management positions in multilateral affairs and the United Nations, as Head of the Economic and Budgetary Affairs Department at the United Nations Directorate (2020-2022) and as Deputy Head of Department in charge of human development at the Sustainable Development Directorate (2018-2020).

She has been an adviser on the Arab world at the Ministry (2009-2011) and in embassies. At the French Embassy in Lebanon (2011-2015), she more specifically coordinated asylum issues and French humanitarian cooperation on behalf of Syrian and Palestinian refugees, in liaison with the United Nations and NGOs in Tunisia (2015-2018), she worked in particular on governance and human rights cooperation.

She has also worked as an adviser in field of European affairs and on strategic and security issues at the Ministry (2003-2006) and at France’s Permanent Representation to the European Union in Brussels (2006-2009). There she represented France on the PSC working group on civilian crisis management (CIVCOM), which she co-chaired during the French Presidency of the EU Council in 2008. https://ie.ambafrance.org/H-E-Celine-Place-Ambassador-of-France-in-Ireland

== Embassy ==
The embassy is located at 66 Merrion Square. The public entrance is located towards the rear of the building at 66 Fitzwilliam Lane.

== Former Embassy Building ==
In 1930, 53 Ailesbury Road was acquired by the French government for the French legation to the Irish Free State. It also housed the official residence of the first French Minister to the Irish Free State, Charles Alphand.

Initially known as Mytilene, the building was designed by Irish architect Alfred Gresham Jones and was completed over two years between 1883 and 1885.

The French legation was transferred from its original location in Leixlip Castle, to the newly renovated Ailesbury Road address on 7 April 1931.

In 2015, the French Embassy moved to its current location in Merrion Square and the original building continues to serve as the official residence of the French Ambassador.

== Gallery ==
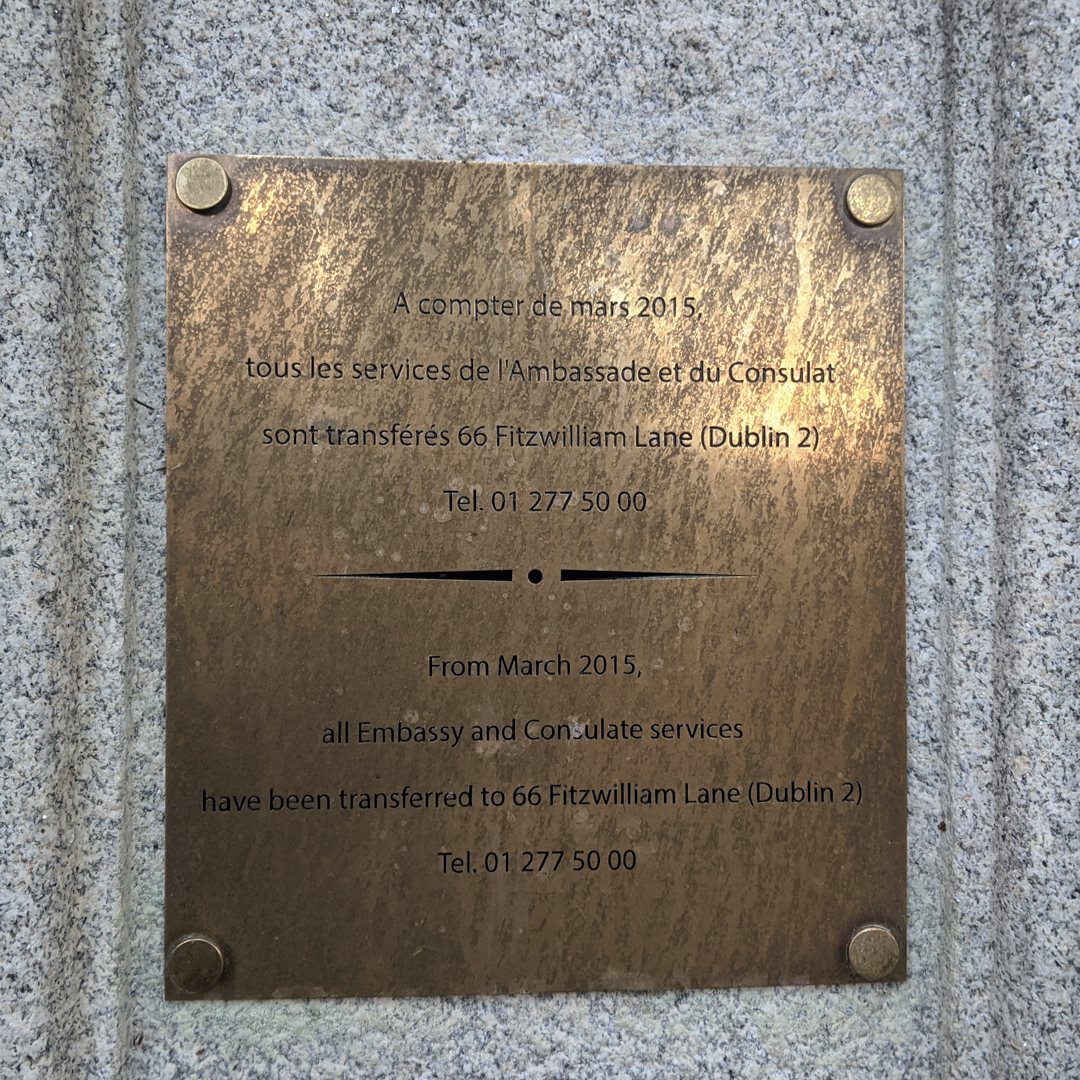
Plaque located outside 53 Ailesbury Road

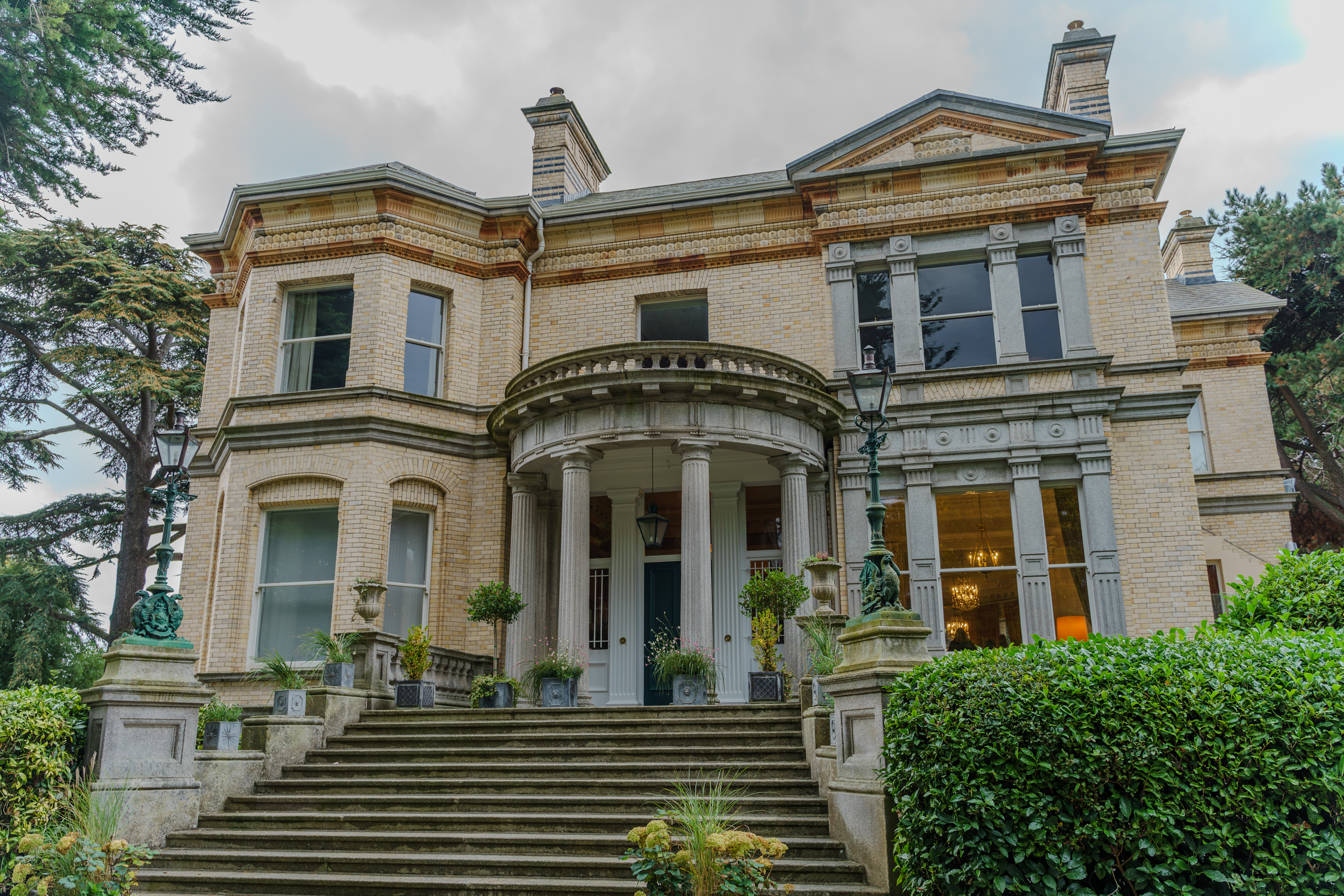
Mytilene, 53 Ailesbury Road

== See also ==
- France–Ireland relations
- Foreign relations of Ireland
- List of diplomatic missions in Ireland
