= Embassy of Greece, Dublin =

Embassy of Greece in Ireland

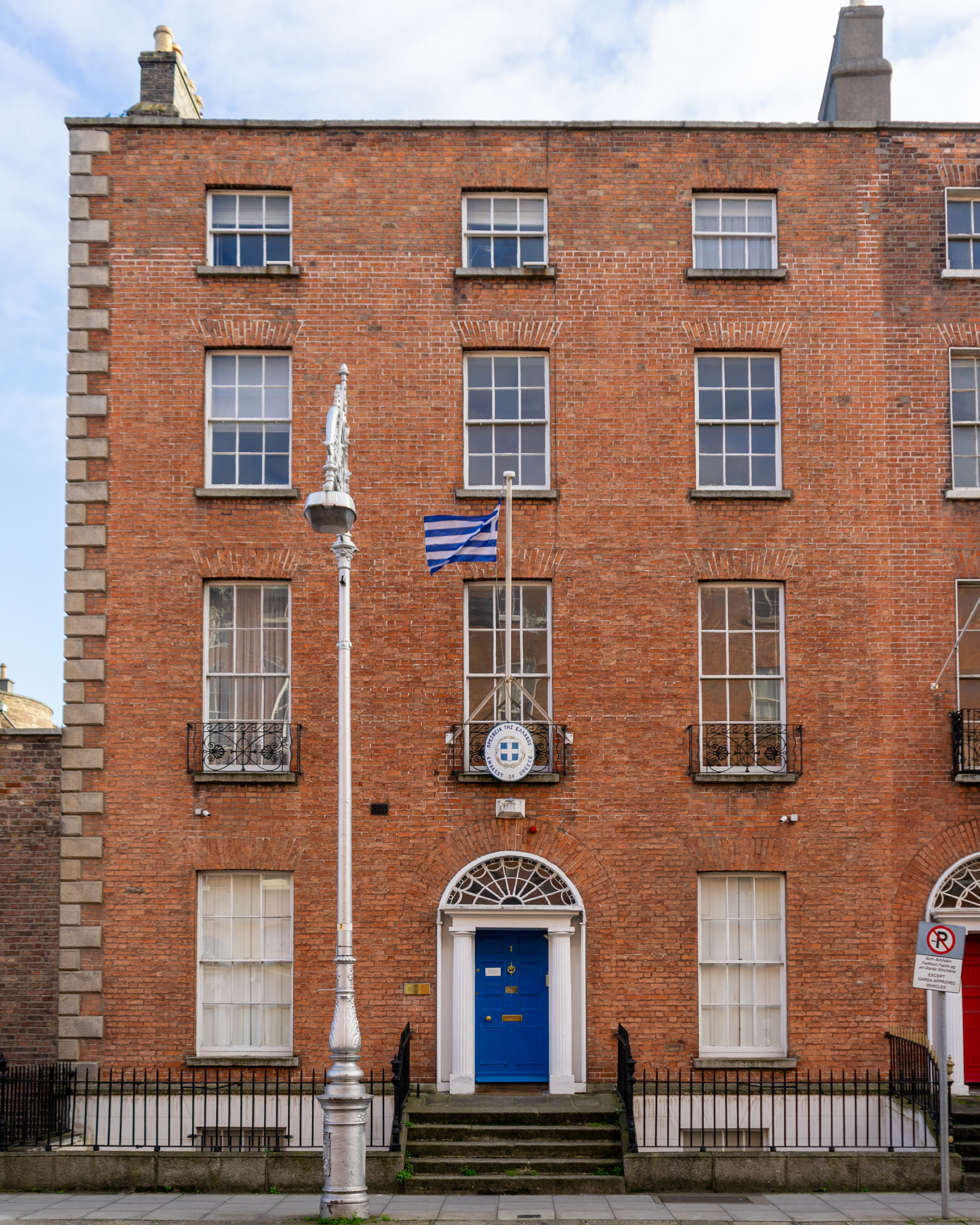
- Location: Fitzwilliam Square, Dublin
- Address: 1 Pembroke Street Upper, Dublin 2, D02 V250
- Opening: 1977
- Ambassador: Georgios Stilianopoulos
- Website: Embassy of Greece in Ireland

The Embassy of Greece in Ireland is the diplomatic mission of Greece in Ireland. It is located in the capital of Ireland, Dublin.

== History ==
Greece established diplomatic relations with Ireland in 1975, and opened its embassy in Dublin in 1977.

== Building ==
The Greek embassy is located within Dublin's Georgian core on Pembroke Road, close to Fitzwilliam Square, one of Dublin's Georgian Garden squares.

The embassy is situated in a four-storey over basement terraced-townhouse, which was built c. 1825, and retains its original redbrick façade.

== See also ==
- Foreign relations of Ireland
- List of diplomatic missions in Ireland
