= France–Ireland relations =

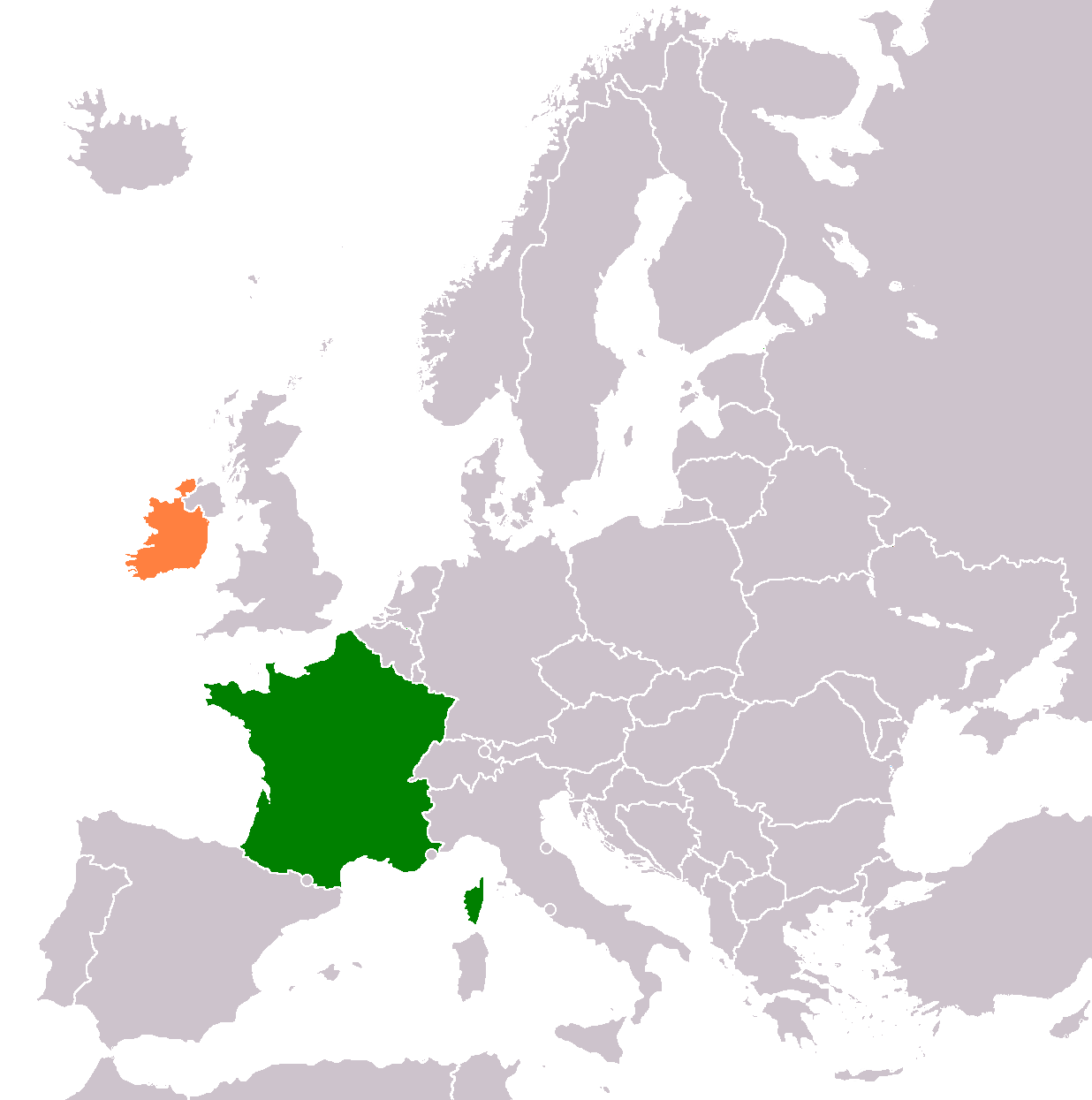

- France: Ireland

Diplomatic mission
- Embassy of France, Dublin: Embassy of Ireland, Paris

France and Ireland maintain bilateral relations. France has an embassy in Dublin, while Ireland has an embassy in Paris and a consulate-general in Lyon. France and Ireland are both members of the Council of Europe, European Union and the Organisation for Economic Co-operation and Development. Ireland is an associate member of La Francophonie.

== History ==
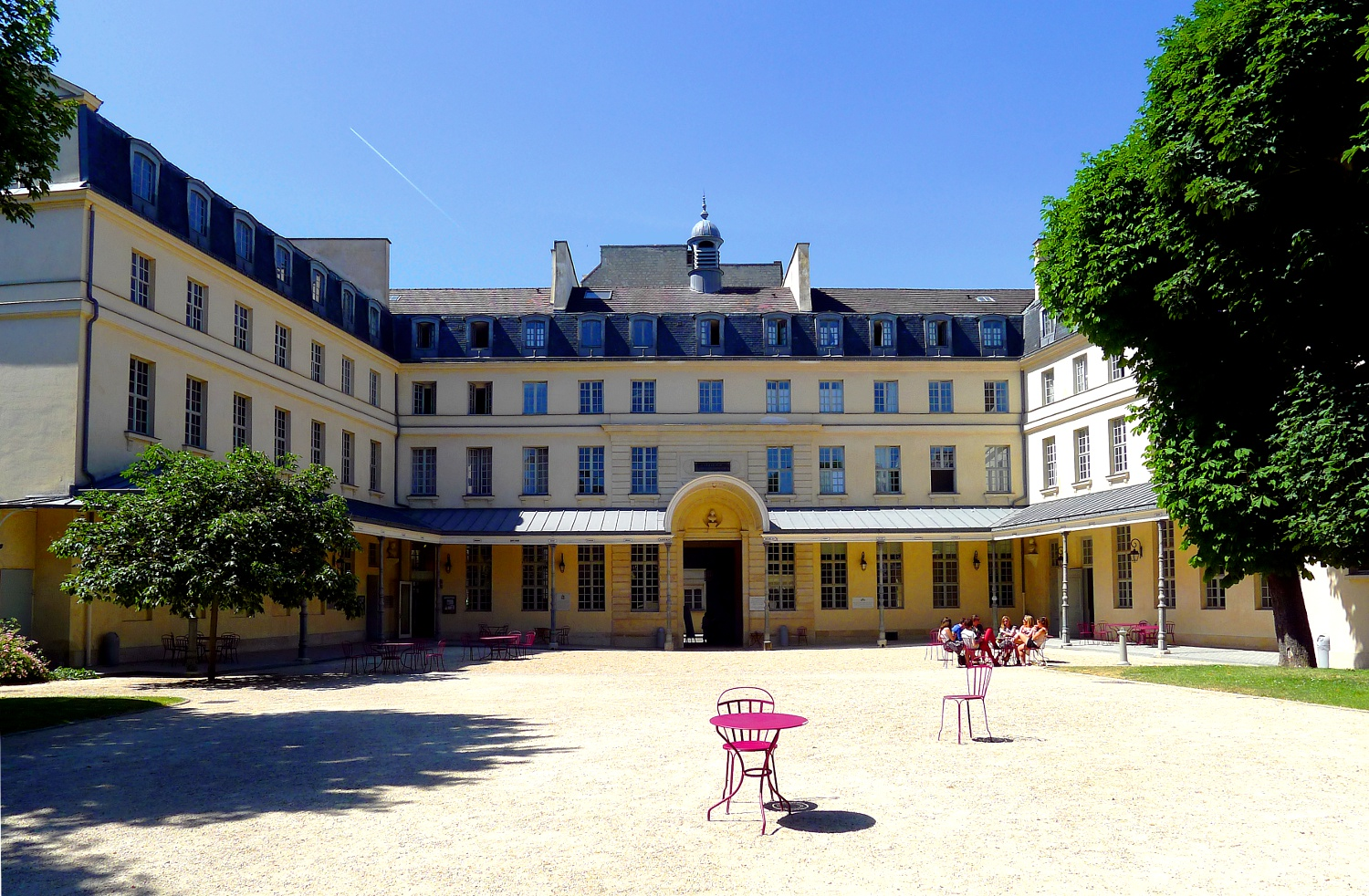
Former Irish College in Paris (Present day Irish Cultural Centre)

France and Ireland have a long history of relations given the proximity between Ireland and France.

During the early medieval period, Ireland and Francia maintained trade, religious, and diplomatic relations. In the late sixth and seventh centuries, Ireland imported wheel-made pottery, wine, grain, and beer from Gaul. An intriguing record from the 640s describes a ship at the Frankish port of Nantes laden with 100 measures of wine, 200 of grain, and 100 of beer bound for Ireland. In exchange, the Irish exported surplus agricultural and manufactured goods. The seventh-century Life of St Philibert of Noirmoutier records the arrival of an Irish ship off the north-western coast of France laden with shoes and clothing. By the twelfth century, this trade included luxury animal pelts, with ships sailing from Ireland to Rouen paying a toll in marten skins. Slaves were also traded; records from the sixth century note Irish slaves sold in Marseilles, and Rouen later served as a market for captives brought from the Irish Sea region..

Religious connections began in the late sixth century when Irish monks travelled to the Continent. Around 590, St Columbanus arrived in the Frankish kingdom of Austrasia, where he founded monasteries at Annegray, Fontaine, and Luxeuil under Merovingian patronage. His monastic rules influenced the Frankish nobility and led to new monastic foundations across Francia.

During the ninth-century Carolingian Renaissance, Irish scholars such as the poet Sedulius Scottus and the philosopher John Scottus Eriugena were hosted at the court of King Charles the Bald in West Francia. In the twelfth century, St Malachy of Armagh travelled through France and befriended St Bernard of Clairvaux, a relationship that led to the introduction of the Continental Cistercian and Augustinian orders to Ireland.

Diplomatic contact was established in 848 following Irish military victories against the Vikings. According to the Annals of St-Bertin, an Irish embassy was dispatched to the court of Charles the Bald. The envoys brought gifts to announce their victory, establish a peace treaty, and request safe passage for Irish pilgrims travelling through Francia to Rome.

There has always been migration back and forth between the two since ancient times. In 1578, the Irish College in Paris was established as a Catholic school to train Irish students. In 1689, France supported Ireland during the Williamite War to restore King James II of England to the throne. After the Treaty of Limerick, for the next hundred years, the French Army would include an Irish Brigade in its army. The Irish who fought for France (and other foreign nations) would come to be known as Wild Geese. Many Irish soldiers also traveled and served with the French in the exploration and colonization of New France.

In 1796, inspired by the French Revolution, the Society of United Irishmen began an uprising against British rule in Ireland which became known as the Irish Rebellion of 1798 and was led by Irish revolutionary fighter Wolfe Tone. France supported the Irish rebellion and, in December 1796, sent its Expédition d'Irlande of 12,000 soldiers to Bantry Bay, County Cork; however, the soldiers were not able to land as there were 40,000 British troops in the area waiting for them. In August 1798, a French fleet landed in Killala Bay, County Mayo with 1,060 soldiers under the command of General Jean Joseph Amable Humbert. Irish rebels joined the French against the British but lost at the Battle of Ballinamuck in September 1798. The Irish rebels were executed while the surviving French soldiers were repatriated. The aftermath of the fight became known as Bliain na bhFrancach (The Year of the French). In 1803, Napoléon Bonaparte created the Irish Legion which fought for France in the Walcheren Campaign and Peninsular War. The legion was disbanded in 1815. In 1873, Patrice de MacMahon became the first French President of Irish descent.

As part of the British Empire, Irish soldiers fought in France during World War I (1914–1918) and Irish troops fought in the Battle of the Somme. In 1922, the Irish Free State obtained its independence from the United Kingdom. In 1929, Ireland opened a diplomatic legation in Paris and appointed Gerald Edward O'Kelly de Gallagh et Tycooly as the first Irish Minister to France. In 1930, France opened its first diplomatic legation in Dublin. During World War II (1939–1945) Ireland remained officially neutral. Approximately 50 Irish men and women joined the French Resistance, such as Irish writer Samuel Beckett. After the war, both nations upgraded their diplomatic legations to embassies.

In 1969, French President Charles de Gaulle paid an official visit to Ireland and met with Irish President Éamon de Valera. Since the establishment of diplomatic relations, relations between France and Ireland have been close and both nations have worked together within the European Union. France is Ireland's fourth largest tourism market. 9,000 French citizens reside in Ireland and 15,000 Irish citizens reside in France. Ireland is an observer member of La Francophonie.

== High-level visits ==
Presidential visits from France to Ireland

- President Charles de Gaulle (1969)
- President François Mitterrand (1984, 1988)
- President Jacques Chirac (2000)
- President Nicolas Sarkozy (2008)
- President François Hollande (2016)
- President Emmanuel Macron (2021)

Presidential and Prime Ministerial (Taoiseach) visits from Ireland to France

- President Patrick Hillery (1985, 1986, 1988)
- President Mary Robinson (1996)
- President Mary McAleese (2005)
- President Michael D. Higgins (2014, 2015)
- Taoiseach Enda Kenny (2015)
- Taoiseach Leo Varadkar (2017)

== Bilateral relations ==
France and Ireland have signed numerous bilateral agreements such as a Trade Agreement (1959); Agreement for the Avoidance of Double Taxation and the Prevention of Fiscal Evasion with respect to Taxes on Income (1968); Agreement on International Road Freight Transport (1976); Agreement on the establishment in France of stocks of crude oil and/or finished petroleum products on behalf of undertakings established in Ireland (1985) and an Agreement on reciprocal holding of stocks of crude oil and/or petroleum products (2015).

== Trade ==
In 2018, trade between France and Ireland totaled €9.8 billion. France's main exports to Ireland include chemical based products and pharmaceuticals products. Ireland's main exports to France are pharmaceuticals products. In 2015, French investments in Ireland totaled 17 billion Euros with 350 French companies operating in Ireland. Irish investments in France totaled €5 billion with 200 Irish companies operating in France, making France Ireland's 9th largest foreign investment destination.

== International organizations ==
While France is a founding member of the EU and NATO, Ireland joined the EU in 1973 but did not become a member of NATO.

== Resident diplomatic missions ==
- France has an embassy in Dublin.
- Ireland has an embassy in Paris and a consulate-general in Lyon.
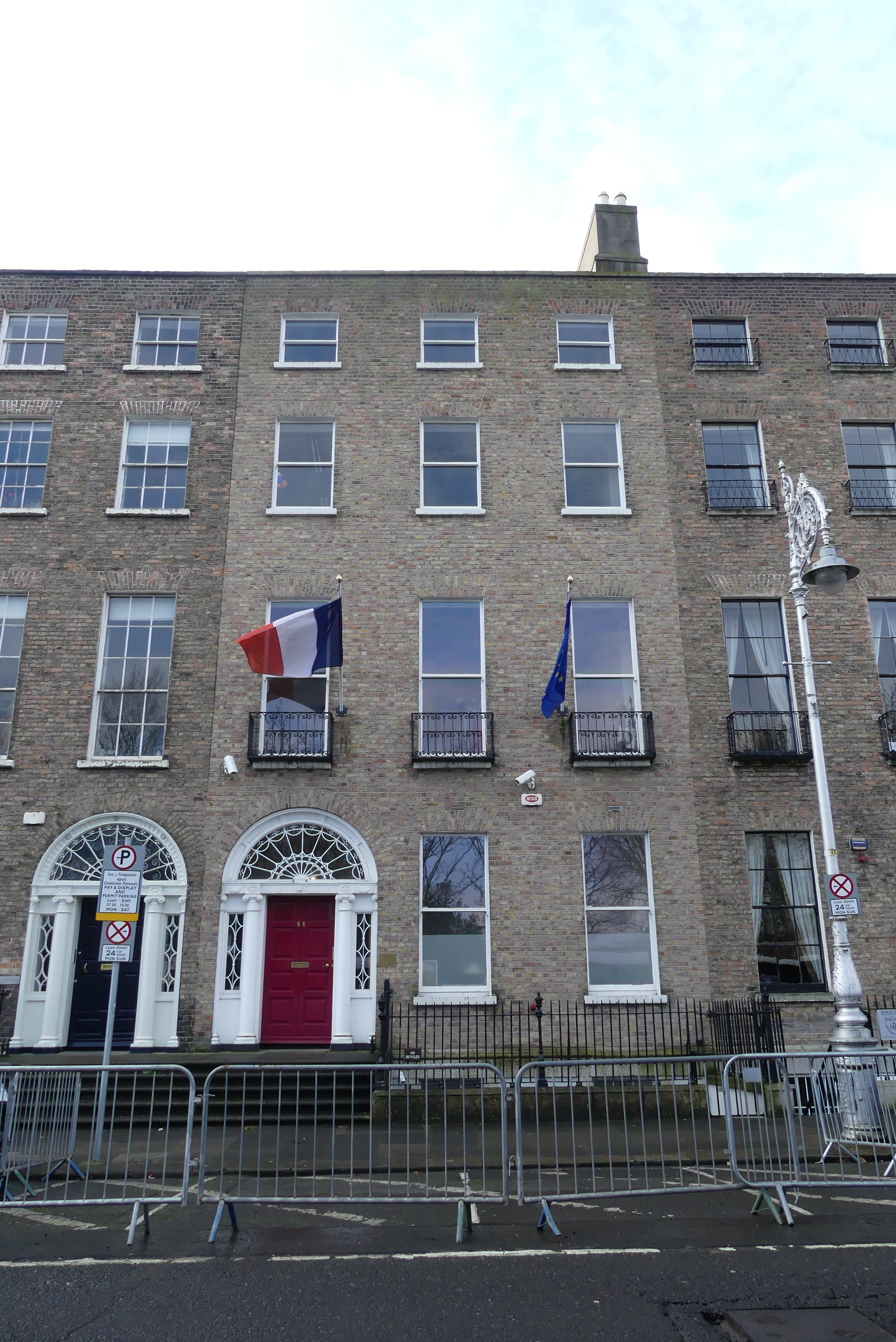
Embassy of France in Dublin

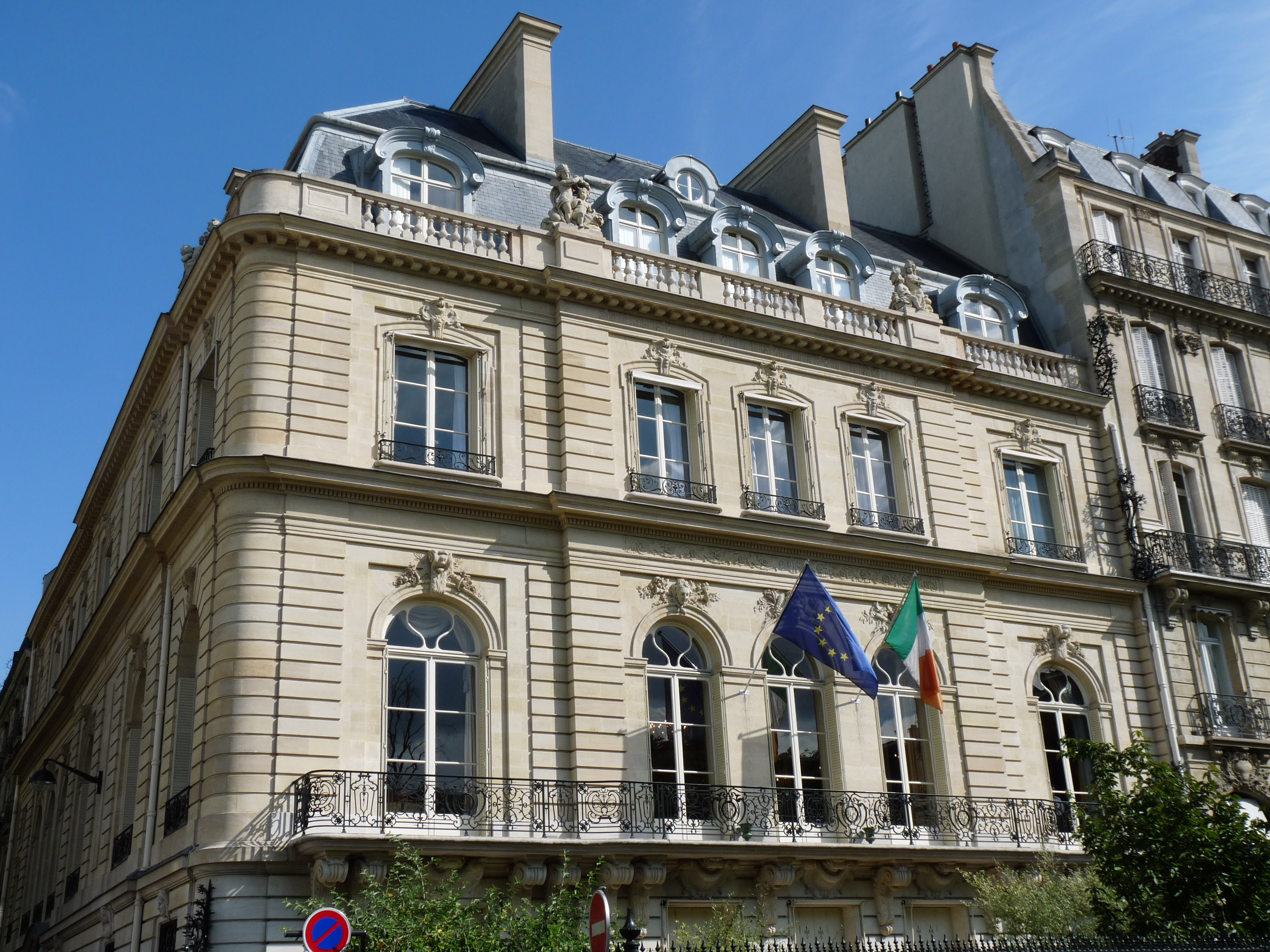
Embassy of Ireland in Paris

== See also ==
- Foreign relations of France
- Foreign relations of Ireland
- Expédition d'Irlande
- Irish Brigade (France)
- Irish of Nantes
- List of Royal French foreign regiments
- France–United Kingdom relations
