= Ireland–Japan relations =

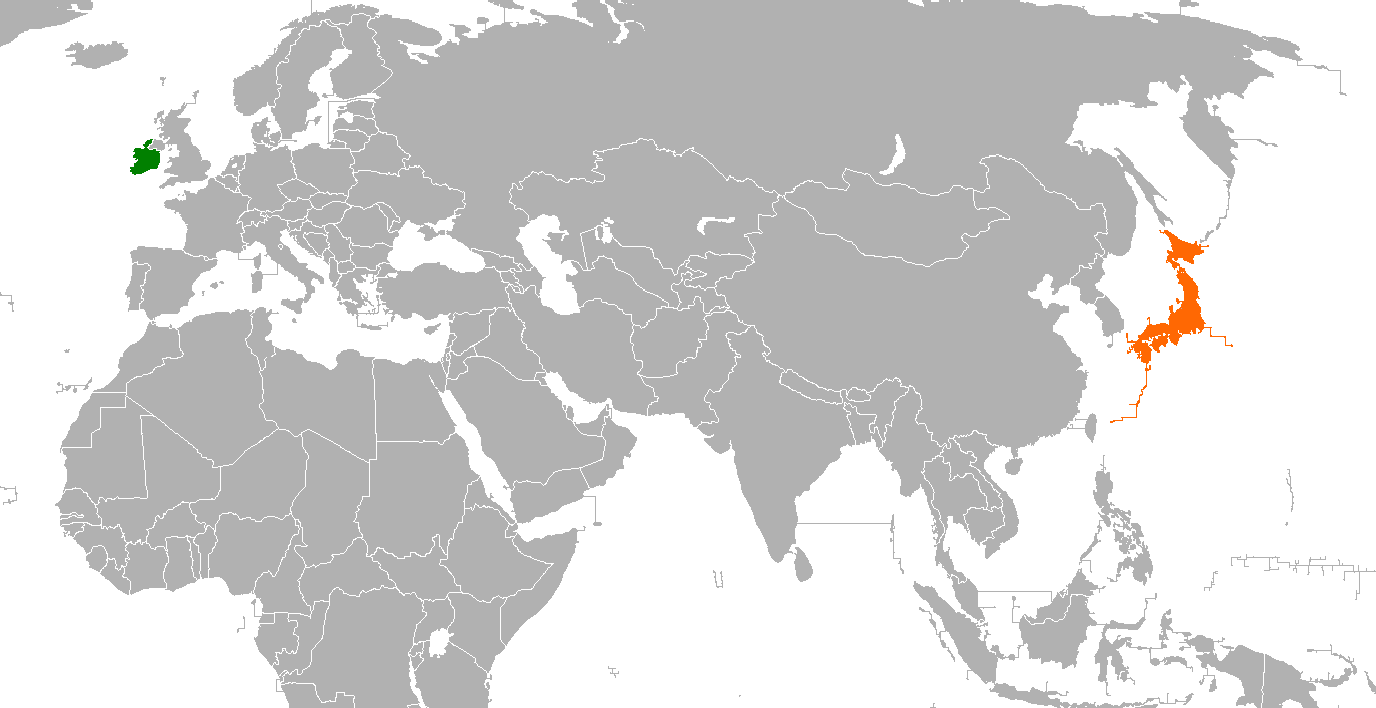

- Ireland: Japan

Diplomatic mission
- Irish Embassy, Tokyo: Japanese Embassy, Dublin

Ireland and Japan maintain bilateral relations. Both nations are members of the Organisation for Economic Co-operation and Development. Relations between the two countries are regarded as friendly.

== History ==
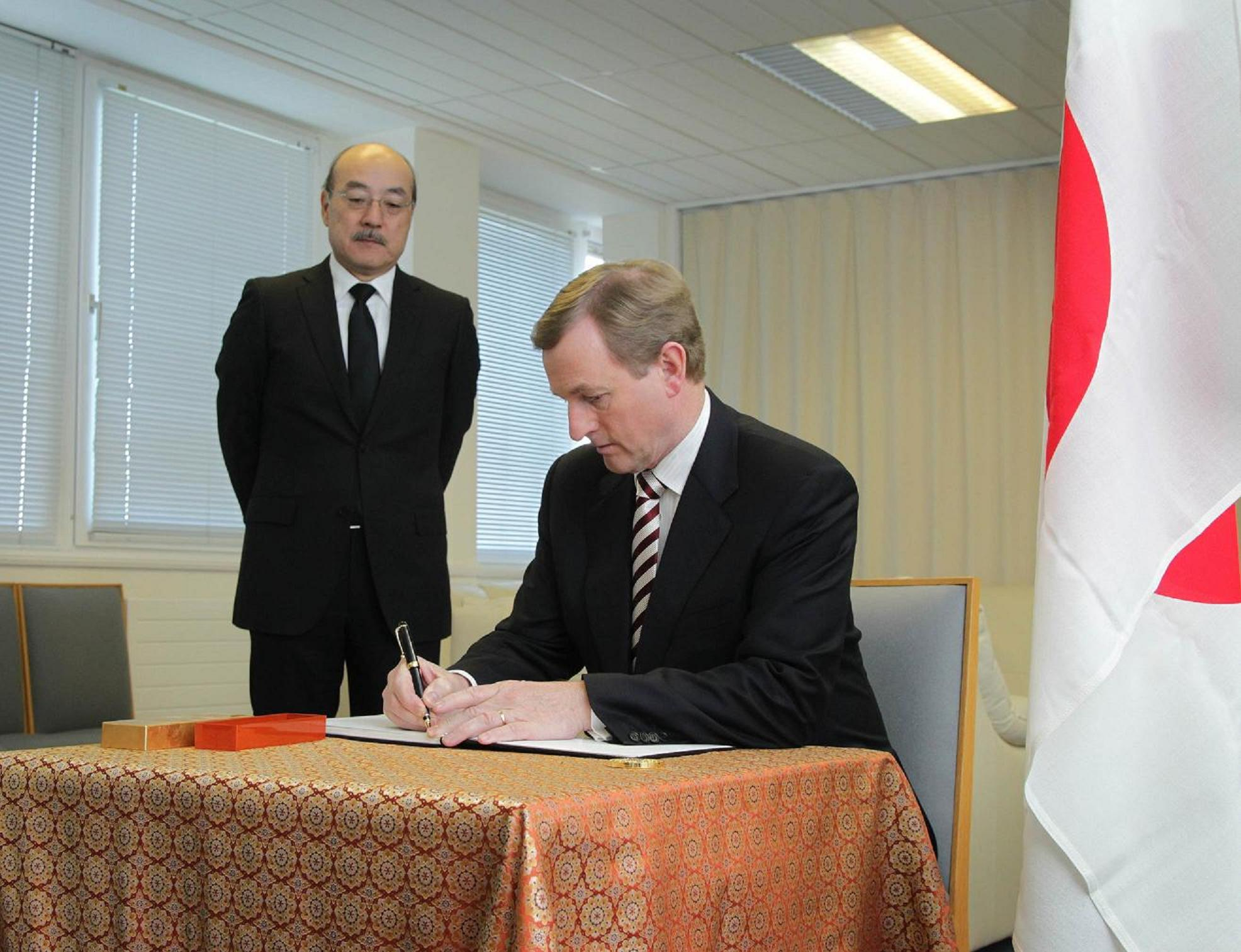
Taoiseach Enda Kenny signing a book of condolence for the victims of the Tōhoku earthquake and tsunami at the Japanese Embassy in Dublin on 22 March 2011.

The oldest record of an Irish person visiting Japan dates back to July 1704, when an Irish sailor, Robert Jansen, was seized off the coast of Kyushu. Jansen and five companions had escaped from the Dutch East India Company in the Philippines and set sail in a small boat hoping to reach Canton (present day Guangzhou). Initially, Jansen and the others were suspected of being Portuguese missionaries and were held until November 1704 before they were finally released and allowed to join a Dutch ship bound for the city of Batavia (present day Jakarta) in the Dutch East Indies.

The first contact between Ireland and Japan took place in December 1872 when members of the Iwakura Mission (while visiting England) traveled to Dublin which became a symbolically significant moment in the development of relations between the two countries. Following the Meiji Restoration (1868), Irish men and women emigrated to Japan, making their mark in a variety of fields. Irish writer Lafcadio Hearn (a.k.a. Koizumi Yakumo) immigrated to Japan and wrote several books about Japan. In 1873, brothers John and Cornelius Collins (who originated from Carrigaline, County Cork) helped found the Imperial Japanese Navy. During the Meiji period, hundreds of Irish nuns and priests have lived, work and taught in Japan since they first arrived during that period. Many Irish nuns and priests also chose to remain in Japan during World War II.

In March 1957, Ireland and Japan officially established diplomatic relations. Japan was the first east-Asian country with which Ireland established diplomatic links. That same year, both nations accredited ambassadors to each other capitals. In 1964, Japan upgraded its diplomatic legation in Dublin to an embassy. In 1973, Ireland opened a resident embassy in Tokyo. In September 1983, Irish President Patrick Hillery became the first Irish head of state to visit Japan. In 1985, Japanese Crown Prince Akihito and Crown Princess Michiko paid a visit to Ireland. The Royal couple would later return to Ireland as Emperor and Empress of Japan in 2005. In June 2013, Shinzō Abe became the first Japanese Prime Minister to visit Ireland.

Both nations work closely together in the United Nations and have a shared commitment to democracy, human rights, freedom and justice, peace, the rule of law, and the eradication of poverty. In 2017, both nations celebrated 60 years of diplomatic relations.

== High-level visits ==
High-level visits from Ireland to Japan

- President Patrick Hillery (1983, 1989, 1990)
- Taoiseach Charles Haughey (1989)
- President Mary Robinson (1995)
- Taoiseach Bertie Ahern (2004)
- President Mary McAleese (2005)
- Taoiseach Brian Cowen (2009)
- Taoiseach Enda Kenny (2013)
- Taoiseach Micheál Martin (2022)
- Taoiseach Micheál Martin (2025)

High-level visits from Japan to Ireland

- Crown Prince Akihito and Crown Princess Michiko (1985)
- Princess Sayako (2000)
- Princess Takamado (2003, 2017)
- Emperor Akihito and Empress Michiko (2005)
- Prime Minister Shinzō Abe (2013)

== Agreements ==
Both nations have signed several bilateral agreements, such as an agreement on the avoidance of double taxation and the prevention of fiscal evasion with respect to taxes on income (1974); an agreement on a working holiday visa (2007); an agreement to further consolidate bilateral political, economic and cultural ties, and also to promote mutual understanding by strengthening contact and exchange between both peoples (2007); an agreement on social security (2011), and an agreement on visa exemption of 6 months for citizens of both countries (2016).

== Trade ==
In 2016, trade between Ireland and Japan totaled US$6.9 billion. Ireland's main exports to Japan are optical instruments and medicines. Japan's main exports to Ireland are medicines and cars. Japan's investment to Ireland is in areas such as ICT, pharmaceutical, life-science and financial services. There are currently 80 Japanese companies investing and operating in Ireland. There are currently 32 Irish companies operating in Japan. In July 2018, the European Union (which includes Ireland) signed a free trade agreement with Japan.

== Resident diplomatic missions ==
- Ireland has an embassy in Tokyo.
- Japan has an embassy in Dublin.
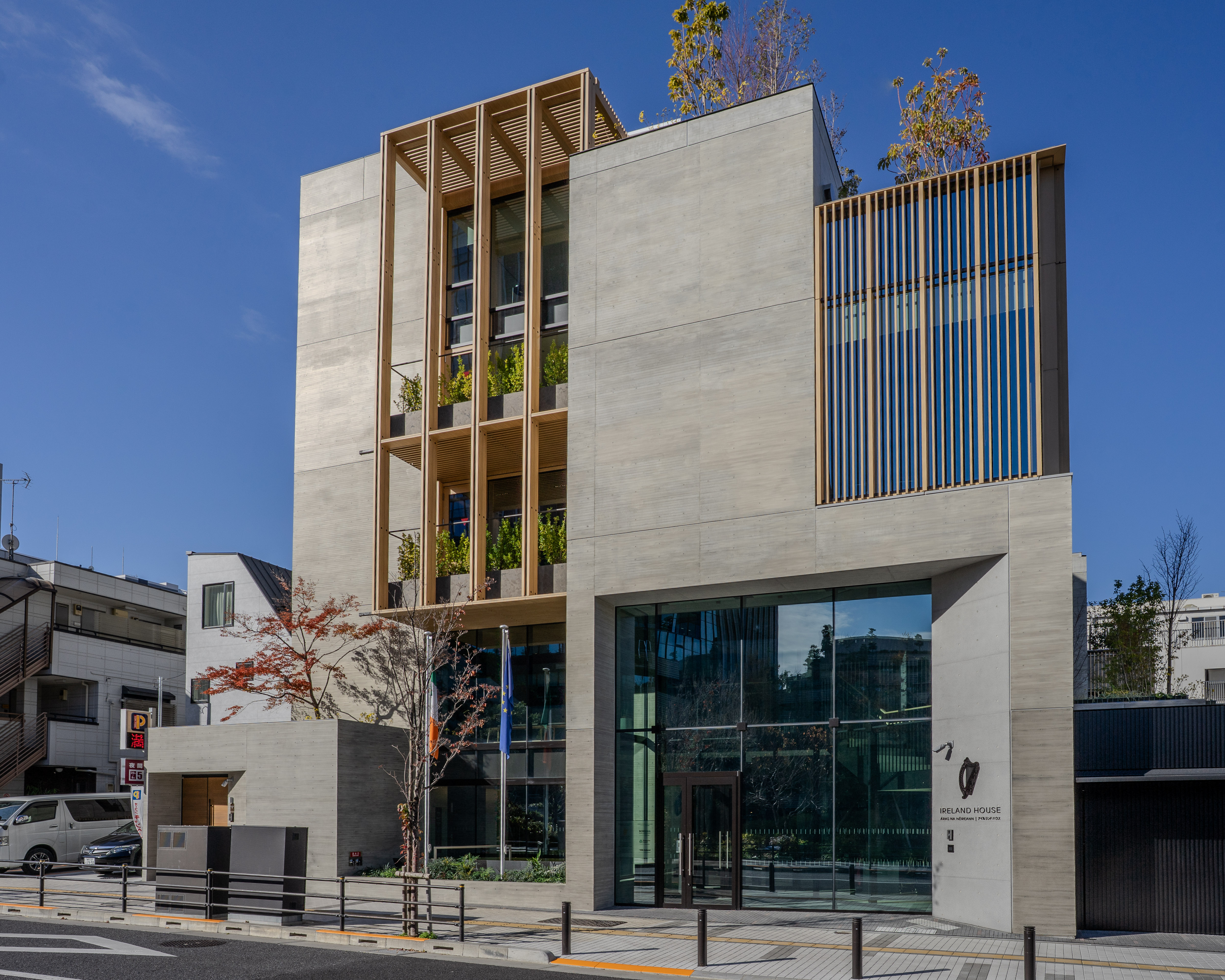
Embassy of Ireland in Tokyo

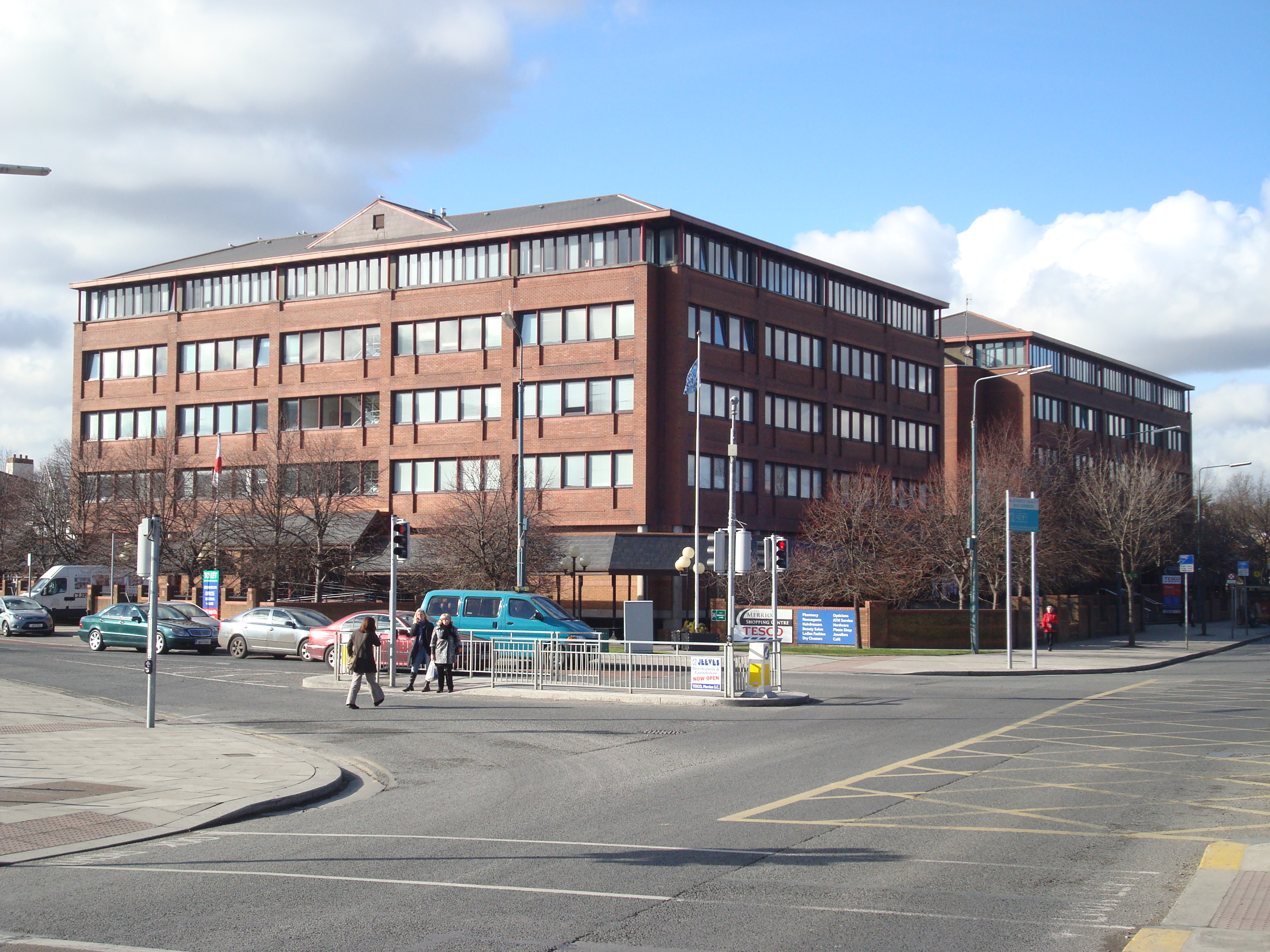
Embassy of Japan in Dublin

== See also ==
- Foreign relations of Ireland
- Foreign relations of Japan
- Irish people in Japan
