= Thomas Bonaventure Lawler =

American author and teacher (1864–1945)

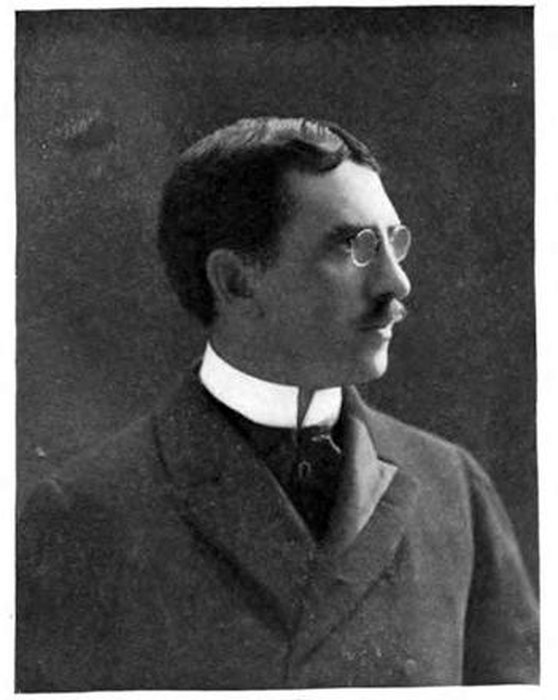
- Born: July 14, 1864; Worcester
- Died: July 20, 1945 (aged 81); New York City
- Education: College of the Holy Cross
- Occupations: Historian, author, publisher, educator, lecturer
- Employer: Ginn & Company

Thomas Bonaventure Lawler (July 14, 1864 – July 20, 1945) was an American author, publisher, lecturer, and educational historian in the late nineteenth and early twentieth centuries.

He was a director of the publishing firm Ginn and Company, a founder of the American Irish Historical Society, and the author of several books, including Essentials of American History and Gateway to American History.

== Early life and education ==
Lawler was born in Worcester, Massachusetts, on July 14, 1864. He was the son of Thomas Lawler and Eliza L. Lawler. He graduated from College of the Holy Cross in 1885 and earned a Master of Arts degree in classical philology from the institution in 1893. Holy Cross awarded him an honorary LL.D. degree in 1910.

== Career ==
Lawler joined Ginn and Company after graduating college in 1885. He took charge of its foreign sales in 1895. He supervised the distribution of American-authored schoolbooks in Russia, China, Japan and South America. He traveled around the world numerously in connection with his work. He also taught himself languages using duplicate Bibles.

On June 19, 1906, he became a partner in Ginn and Company, and became director of its educational publications. In 1939, he became a member of the firm's board of directors upon its incorporation.

Lawler had an interest in history, which developed while he was working toward an A.M. in classical philology at Holy Cross in 1893. His first interests was the literature and history of India, but his travels and business contacts later led him to focus on the Philippines, Spanish America and the United States. He had an appreciation for Spanish culture and translated a number of works from Spanish. Lawyer was also widely known as a lecturer.

Lawler authored several books, including Essentials of American History, The Story of Columbus and Magellan, Gateway to American History, Builders of America, and Standard History of America.

In 1932 Lawler was appointed delegate for Puerto Rico at a meeting of the Democratic National Committee in Washington, D.C.

Lawler was a founder of the American Irish Historical Society. He was credited as co-editor of the first volume of The Journal of the American-Irish Historical Society, published in 1898, alongside Thomas Hamilton Murray. He was identified on the title page as the society's Librarian-Archivist.

Lawler was elected to membership in the American Antiquarian Society in 1925. He was also part clubs such as the Century Club, the Friendly Sons of St. Patrick, the Salamagundi Club, and the Hudson River Country Club.

== Personal life and death ==
Lawler married Margaret Brennan of New York City in 1899. She died in 1943.

Lawler died in his home at 81 in 1945. He was survived by his children Muriel Lawler, Thomas Newman Lawler, Arthur Lawler, and Mrs. James K. Crimmins, as well as a nephew, Charles Kelley of Brooklyn, and eight grandchildren. At his death, he was also identified as the last surviving founder of the American Irish Historical Society.

== Selected works ==
- Essentials of American History. Boston: Ginn and Company. 1902. LCCN 02020874. OCLC 5224525 – via Internet Archive. Reprinted in 2023 ISBN 978-1-175-53359-3
  - Essentials of American History. With illustrations in colors by N. C. Wyeth (Revised ed.). Boston: Ginn and Company. 1918. OCLC 1402341865 – via HathiTrust.
- The Story of Columbus and Magellan. Boston: Ginn and Company. 1904. OCLC 877386835 – via Internet Archive. Reprinted in 2018: ISBN 978-0-484-23430-6
- Gateway to American History. Boston and New York: Ginn and Company. 1924. OCLC 692342930.
- Builders of America. Boston: Ginn and Company. 1927. LCCN 27024033. OCLC 795676.
- Standard History of America. Boston and New York: Ginn and Company. 1933. OCLC 17395741.
- Seventy Years of Textbook Publishing. Boston: Ginn and Company. 1938. OCLC 1468569672.
