= Embassy of Ireland, Tokyo =

Embassy of Ireland in Tokyo
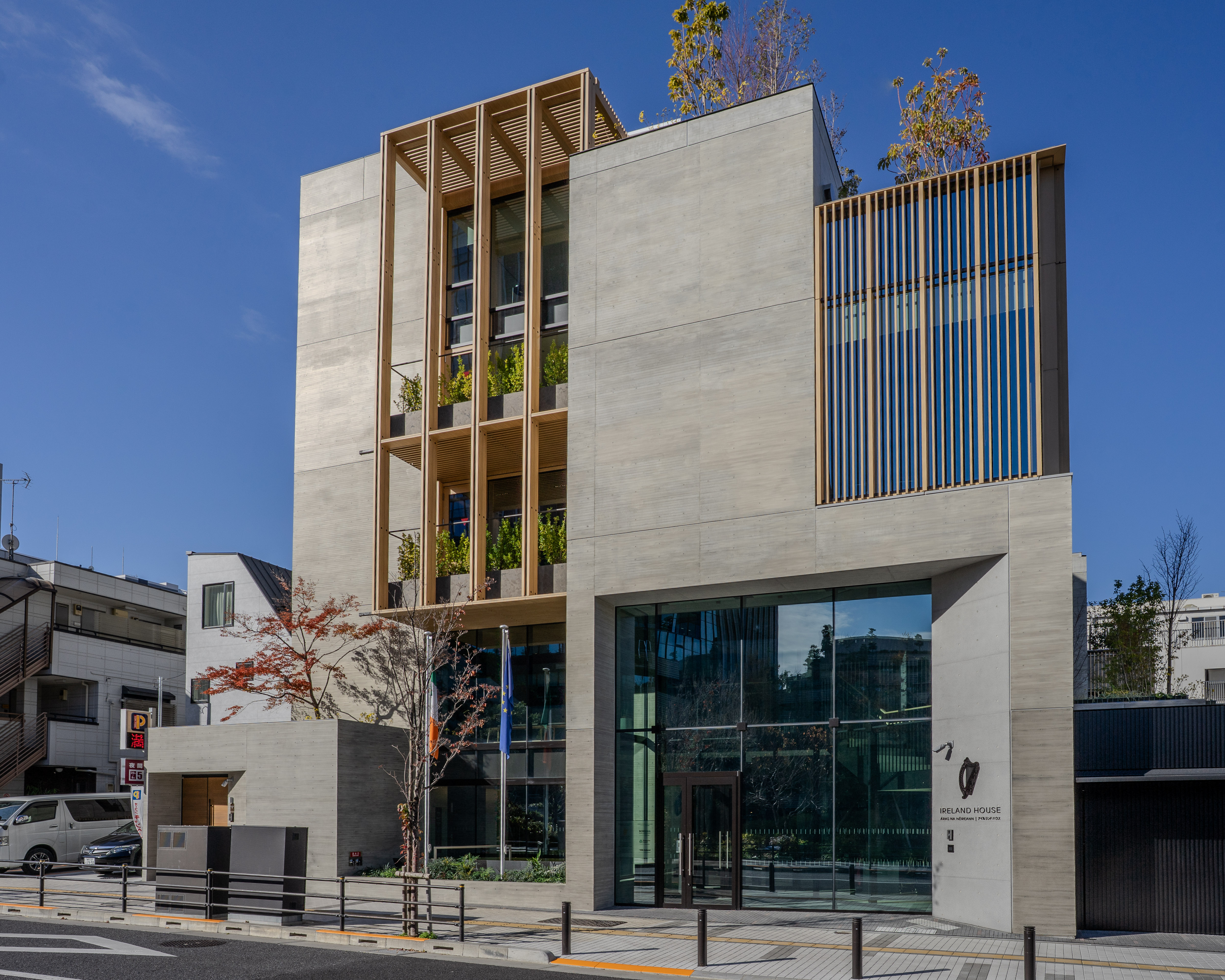
- Location: Shinjuku-ku, Tokyo, Japan
- Address: Ireland House, Yotsuya Honshiochō 1-6, Shinjuku-ku, Tokyo
- Coordinates: 35°41′08.5″N 139°44′26.1″E
- Relocated: 7 April 2025
- Ambassador: Damien Cole
- Website: Irish Embassy, Japan

The Embassy of Ireland in Japan (Irish: Ambasáid na hÉireann, An tSeapáin) is the diplomatic mission of Ireland in Japan.

The embassy is also represented by an Honorary Consul in Sapporo, Hokkaido prefecture.

== New chancellery building ==
In 2019, the Department of Foreign Affairs, in conjunction with the Royal Institute of the Architects of Ireland, announced a competition to create the architectural design for a new Irish embassy in Tokyo. The winning design by the Dublin based architectural firm Henry J Lyons was announced in September 2020.

Construction of the new building was scheduled to begin in March 2023, and was expected to be completed by 2025. The building would be based in the Yotsuya district of Shinjuku, and was expected to cost a total of €23 million. As initially planned, the embassy moved within Tokyo from Kōjimachi to Yotsuya Honshiochō on 7 April 2025.

Around three months later, on 2 July 2025, on the occasion of Irish Prime Minister Micheál Martin’s visit to Japan, an inauguration ceremony and reception for the new Ireland House Tokyo was held to celebrate the opening of the new building, attended by Prime Minister Martin, Japanese State Minister for Foreign Affairs Hisayuki Fujii.

== Gallery ==
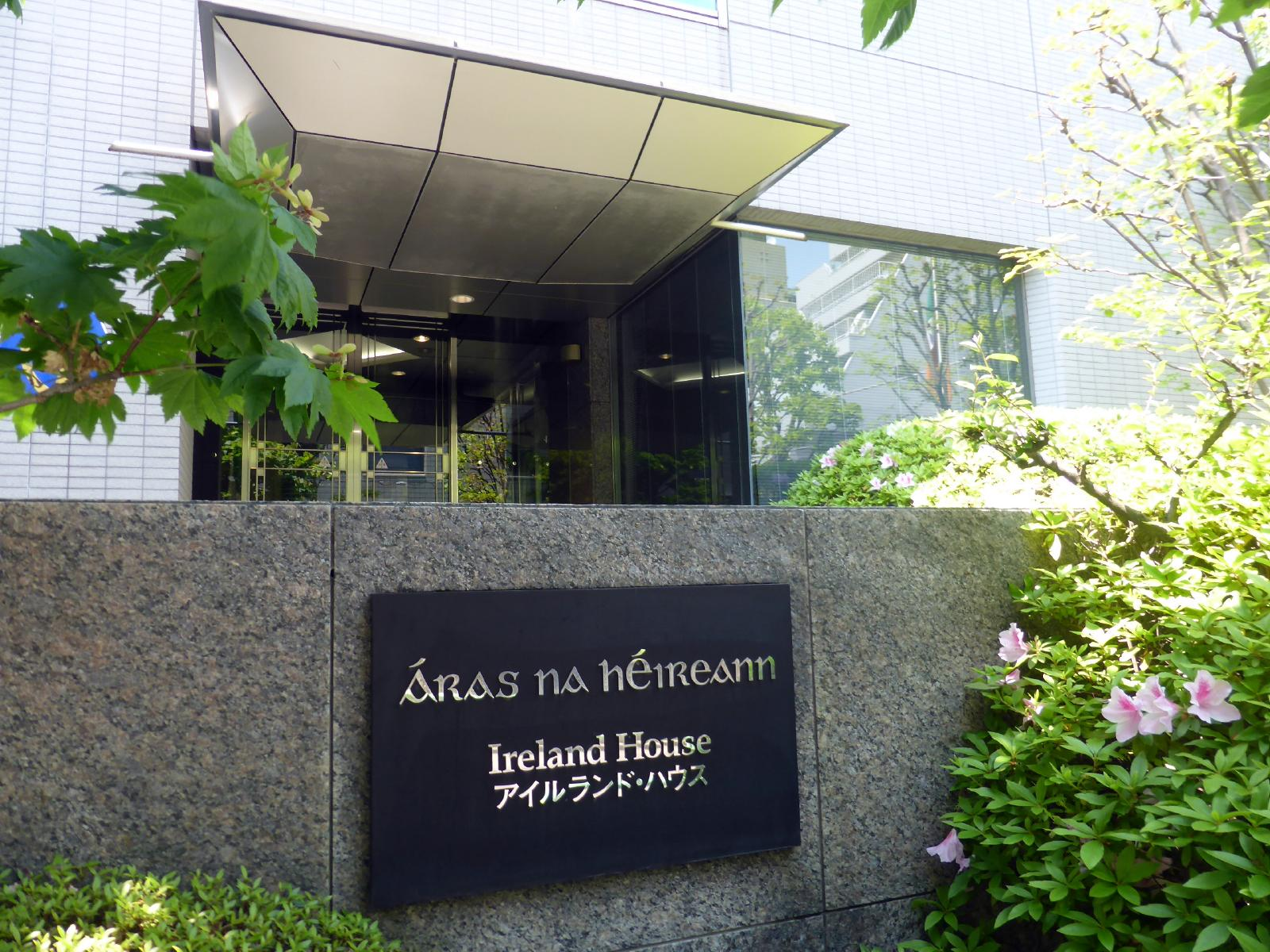
A plaque outside the entrance at the former embassy building in Kōjimachi

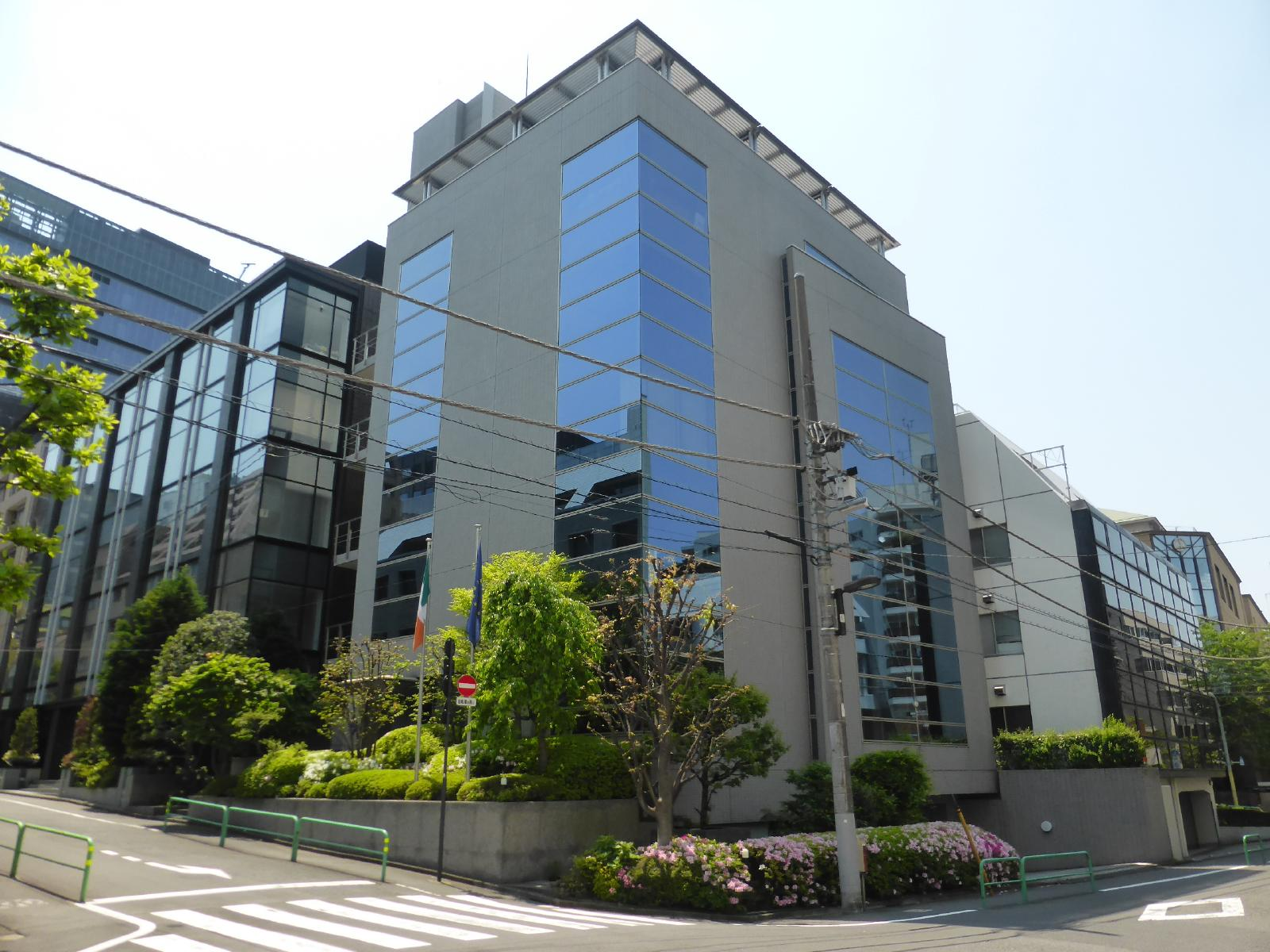
Exterior of the former embassy building in Kōjimachi

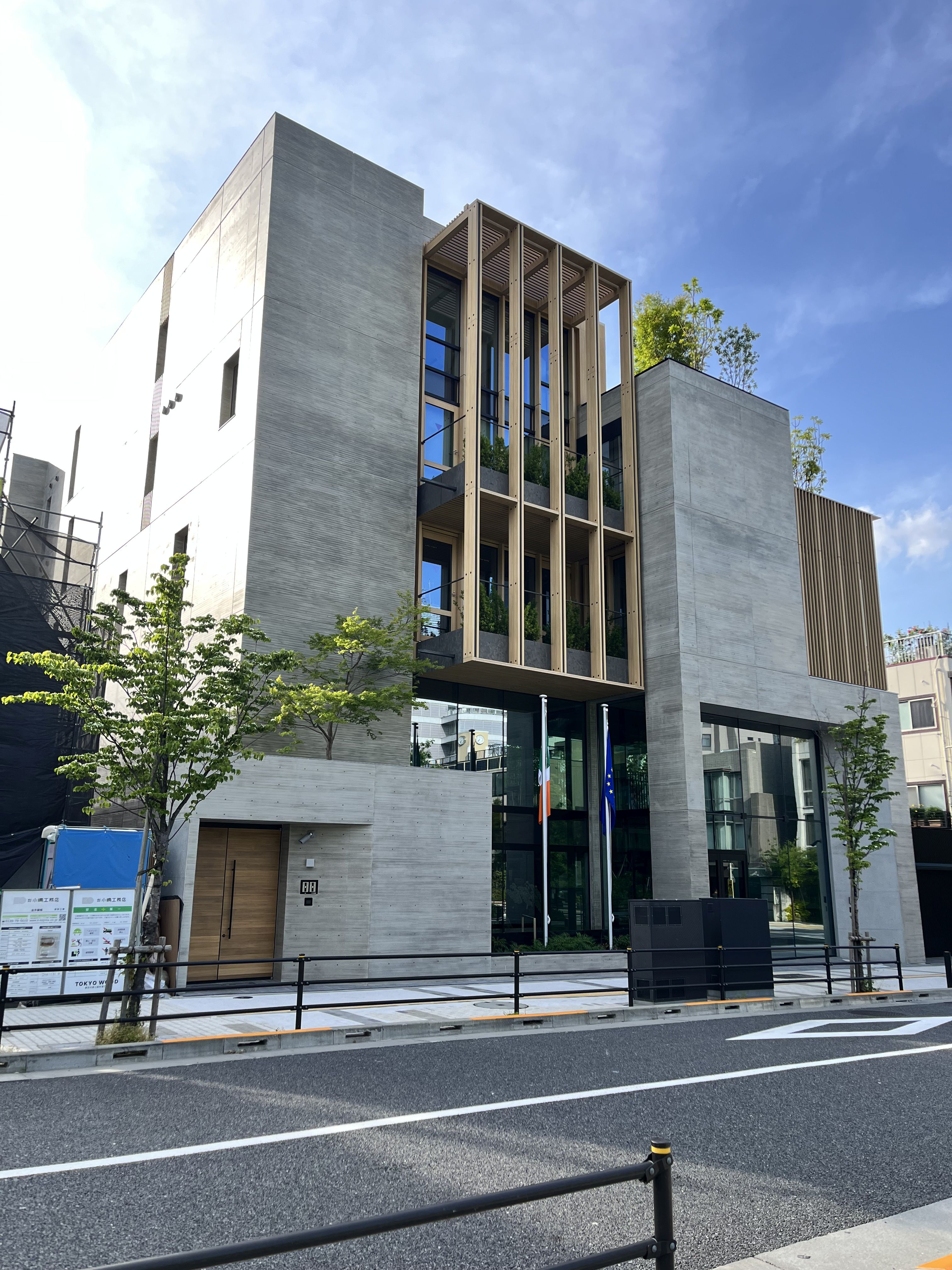
Ireland House, Yotsuya

== See also ==
- Ireland–Japan relations
- List of diplomatic missions of Ireland
