= Joseph Walsh (designer) =

Irish designer

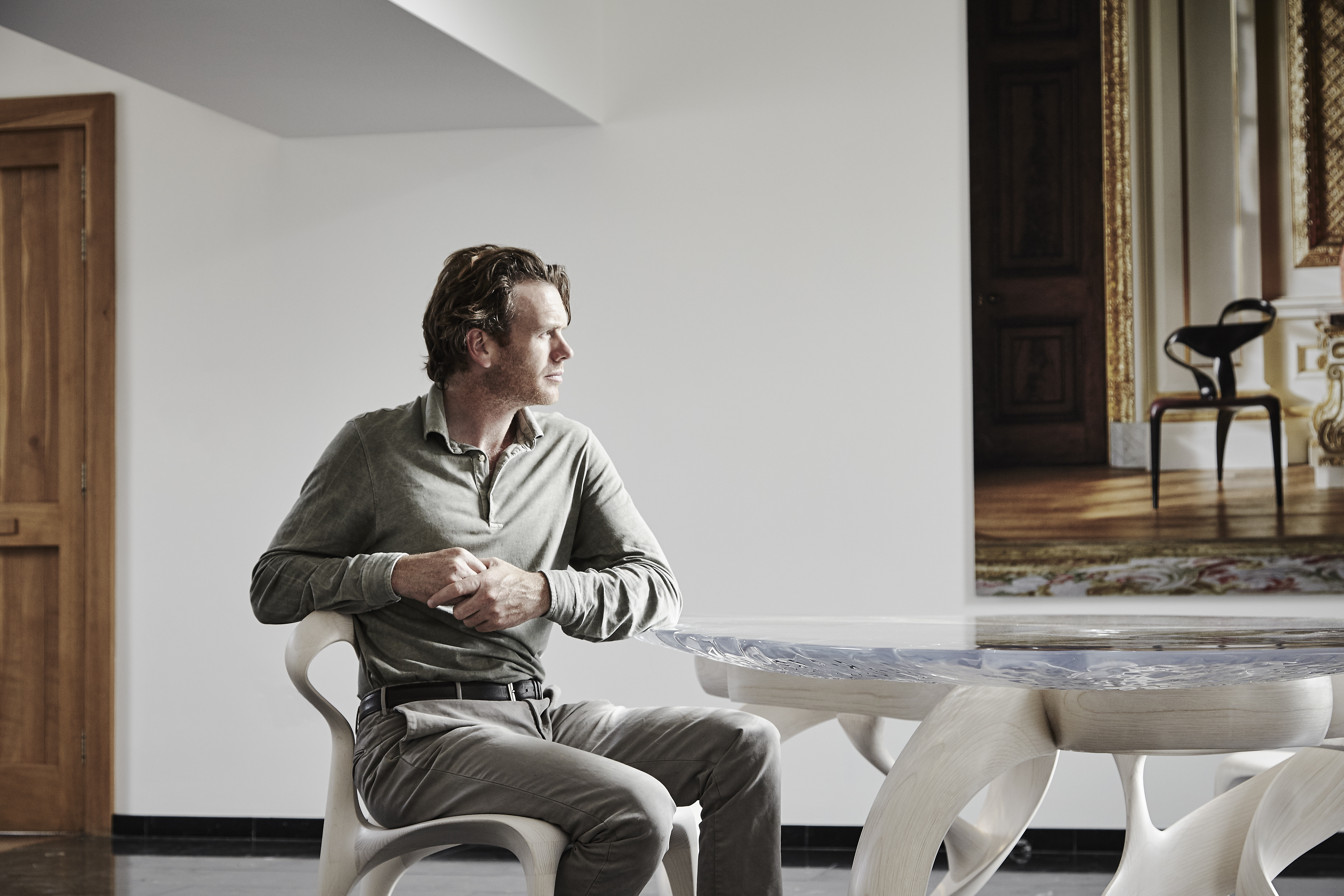
- Joseph Walsh, 2018
- Born: 1979 (age 46–47); County Cork, Ireland
- Known for: Lamination, woodworking, sculpture, furniture design
- Notable work: Magnus Modus, 2017 (French Ash, Limestone, 7.5m x 2.6 m) National Gallery of Ireland
- Awards: Honorary Doctorate of Arts; University College Cork 2015
- Website: www.josephwalshstudio.com

Joseph Walsh (born 1979) is a self-taught Irish furniture maker and designer. He was born in County Cork, where he established his studio and workshop in 1999. From the outset, he pursued innovation in making through traditional techniques, often from other craft forms, which enabled new making methods and forms. This led to significant early commissions including various ecclesiastical clients, the Embassy of Japan and the National Museum of Ireland.

From these early years of experimentation and development, Joseph Walsh began to break the traditional rules of making in order to create the truly bold and expressive forms for which he is known today, realised in an ever-widening range of materials, including wood, resin, marble and bronze. His achievements in design have been recognised by an honorary doctorate from University College Cork, a major commission for the National Gallery of Ireland and the acquisition of works for many major international collections, including most recently the Musée des Arts Décoratifs in Paris.

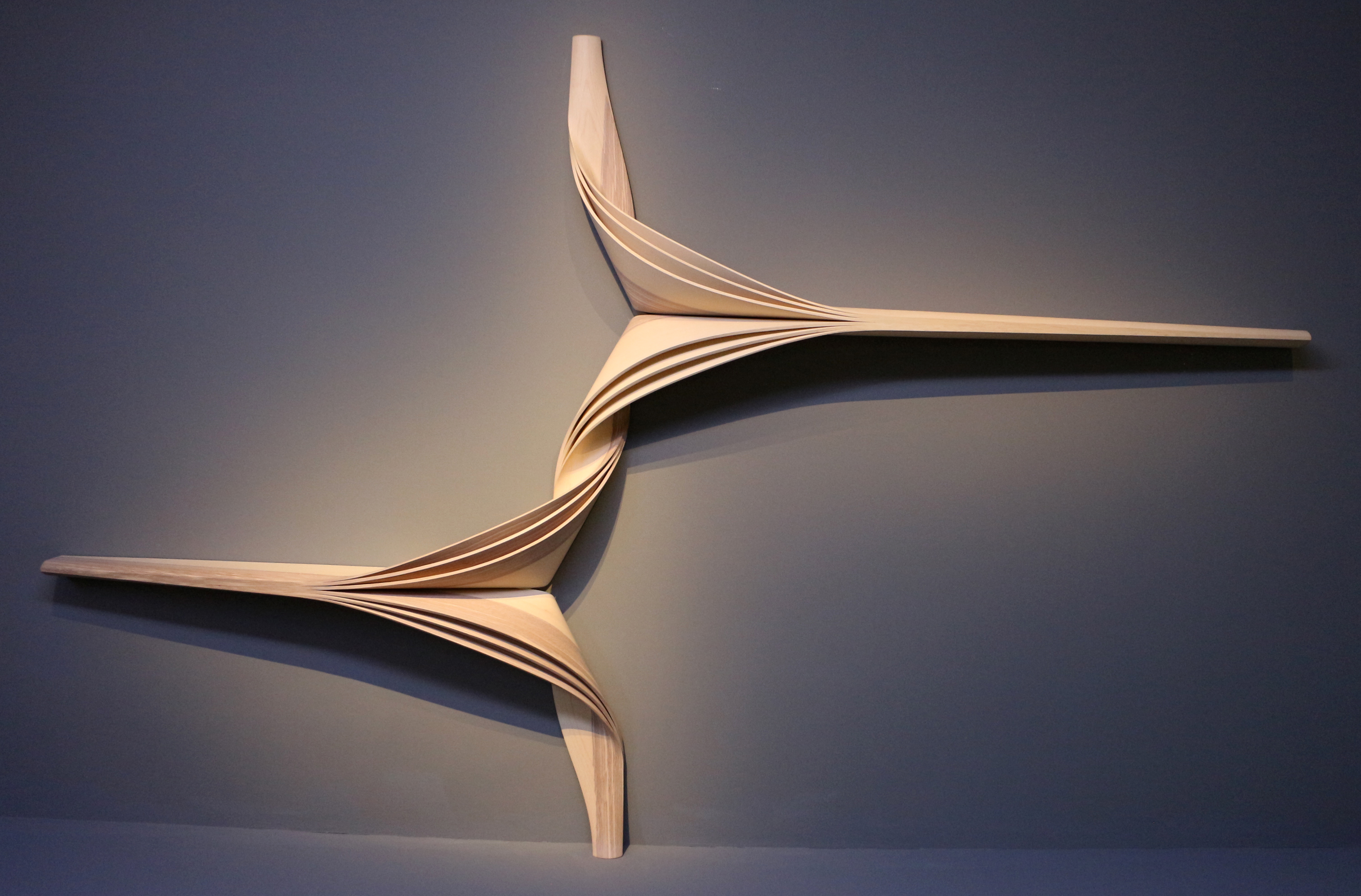
Enignum XV shelf (2014)

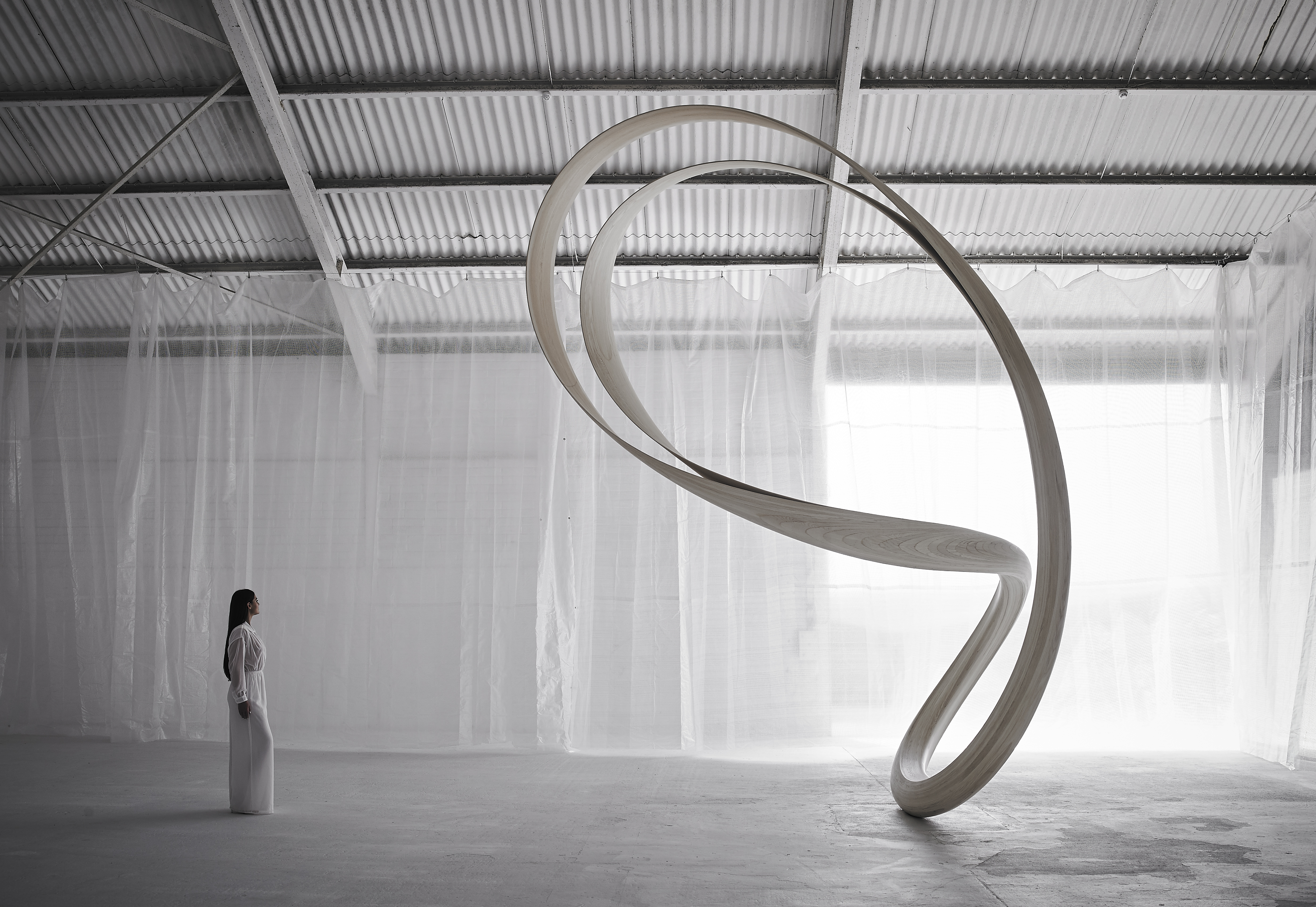
Magnus V IPUT sculpture (2018)

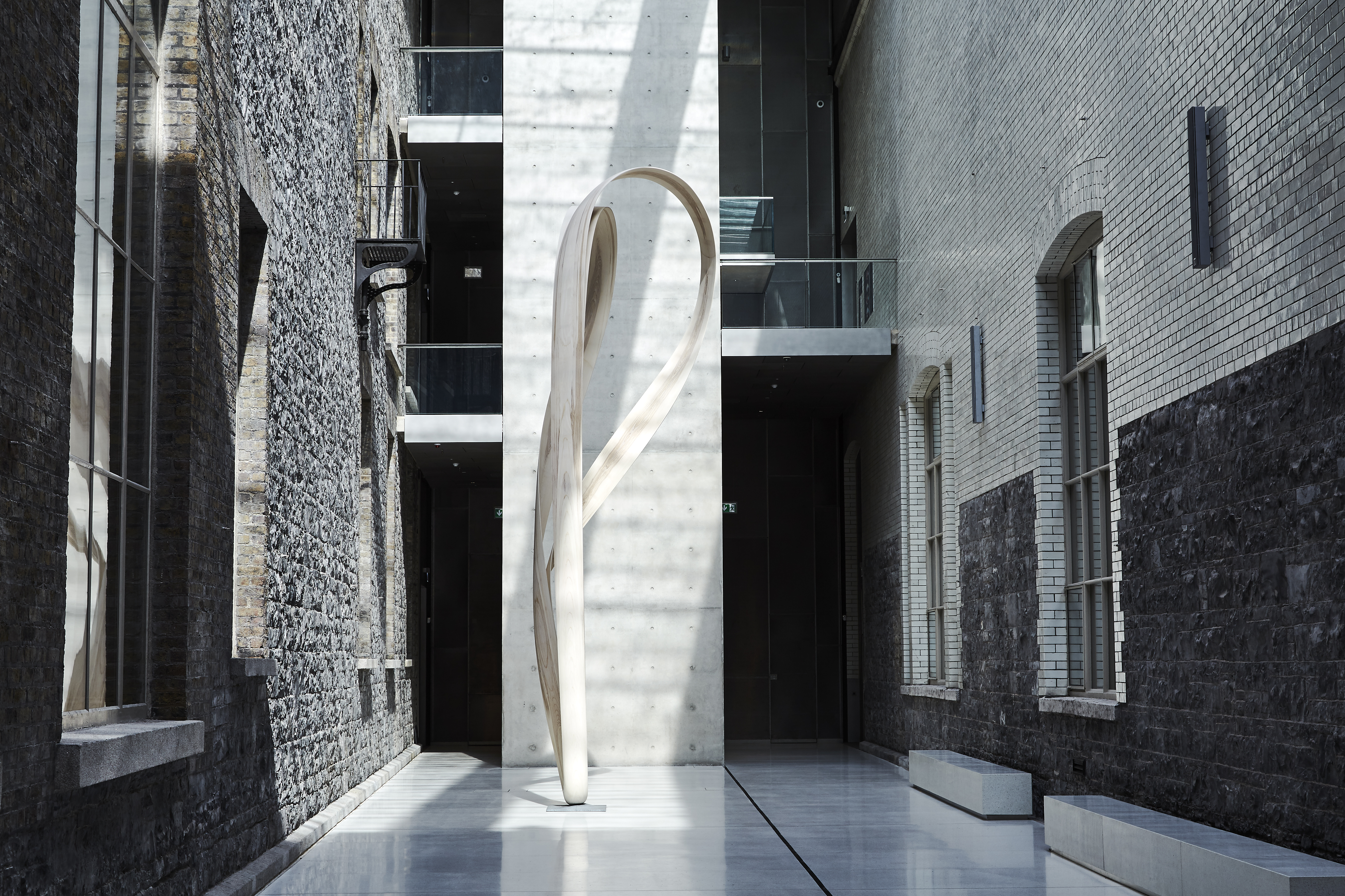
Magnus Modus, National Gallery of Ireland, Dublin (2017)

== Solo exhibitions ==
- Joseph Walsh, Paris, XXIII, Le Domus Maubourg, Paris, France, 2023
- Joseph Walsh, Gestures, London 2022, Sotheby's, London, UK, 2022
- RINN, Sogetsu Arts Centre, Japan, 2018
- LOCUS, Tsubaki Grand Shrine, Japan, 2017
- Reveal, American Irish Historical Society New York, USA, 2017
- Lilium, Oliver Sears Gallery, Dublin, Ireland, 2014
- ENIGNUM and other stories, Oliver Sears Gallery, Dublin, Ireland, 2011
- Realisations, American Irish Historical Society, New York, USA, 2008

== Select group exhibitions ==
- Mirror Mirror: Reflections on Design at Chatsworth, Chatsworth House, Chatsworth, UK, 2023
- Living With Art We Love, Chatsworth House, Chatsworth, UK, 2022
- Mimèsis. Un design vivant, Centre Pompidou-Metz, Metz, France, 2022
- Centre Pompidou x West Bund, Shanghai, China, 2020
- Earth, Wind and Fire: Made in Cork Contemporary, Crawford Art Gallery, Cork, Ireland, 2018
- Making|Breaking: New Arrivals, Cooper Hewitt, Smithsonian Design Museum, New York, USA, 2017
- Narratives in Making, PORTFOLIO: Critical Selection, National Design & Craft Gallery, Kilkenny, Ireland, 2017
- Master Works, LongHouse Reserve, East Hampton, New York, USA, 2016
- Crafted: Objects in Flux, Museum of Fine Arts, Boston, USA
- Side by Side, PORTFOLIO: Critical Selection, National Design & Craft Gallery, Kilkenny, Ireland; Centre Culturel Irlandais, Paris, France; ID2015 Design Hub, Coach House, Dublin, Ireland, 2015
- Design Show: Joseph Walsh, Daniel Naude and Johannes Nagel, Artist House, The Roche Court Educational Trust, New Art Centre, UK, 2014
- Against the Grain: Wood in Contemporary Art and Craft, Museum of Arts and Design, New York, USA, 2013
- Against the Grain: Wood in Contemporary Art and Craft, Mint Museum Uptown, Charlotte, North Carolina, USA, 2012
- Dubh / Dialogues In Black, American Irish Historical Society, New York, USA, 2011
- MATERIALpoetry, American Irish Historical Society, New York, USA, 2010
- Irish Craft Portfolio 2010, National Design & Craft Gallery, Kilkenny, Ireland, 2010

== Permanent collections ==
- Musée des Arts Décoratifs, Paris, France
- The Metropolitan Museum of Art, New York, USA
- National Gallery of Ireland, Dublin, Ireland
- Tsubaki Grand Shrine, Japan
- Cooper Hewitt, Smithsonian Design Museum, New York, USA
- Centre Pompidou, Paris, France
- Museum of Arts and Design, New York, USA
- The Mint Museum of Craft & Design, Charlotte, North Carolina, USA
- The National Museum of Ireland - Decorative Arts & History, Dublin, Ireland
- Devonshire Collection, Chatsworth House, Chatsworth, UK
- Ulster Museum, Ireland
- Embassy of Japan, Dublin, Ireland
- Private collection, Mumbai, India
- Sacred Heart Church, Minane Bridge, Ireland

== Critical reception ==
Ayesha Sohail Shehmir Shaikh, "Design Miami/Basel 2019: Highlights From The Collectible Design Fair", June 11, 2019 "Elemental Design", Aesthetica, 23 May 2019 Mozez Singh, "This incredible cottage perched on Mumbai’s Juhu Beach speaks volumes with its design", Architectural Digest, January 14, 2019 Mitchell Owens, "HOT SEATS", Architectural Digest, March 2018 Mitchell Owens, "Joseph Walsh Gives Derbyshire Palace A Modern Update", Architecture + Design, February 27, 2018 Raul Barrenche, "The Magical World of Joseph Walsh’s Wood Furnishings", Galerie, Winter 2017 Mirror Mirror: Reflections on Design at Chatsworth House, 2023
