= American Irish Historical Society =

Established in 1897, largest curation of Irish identity outside of Ireland

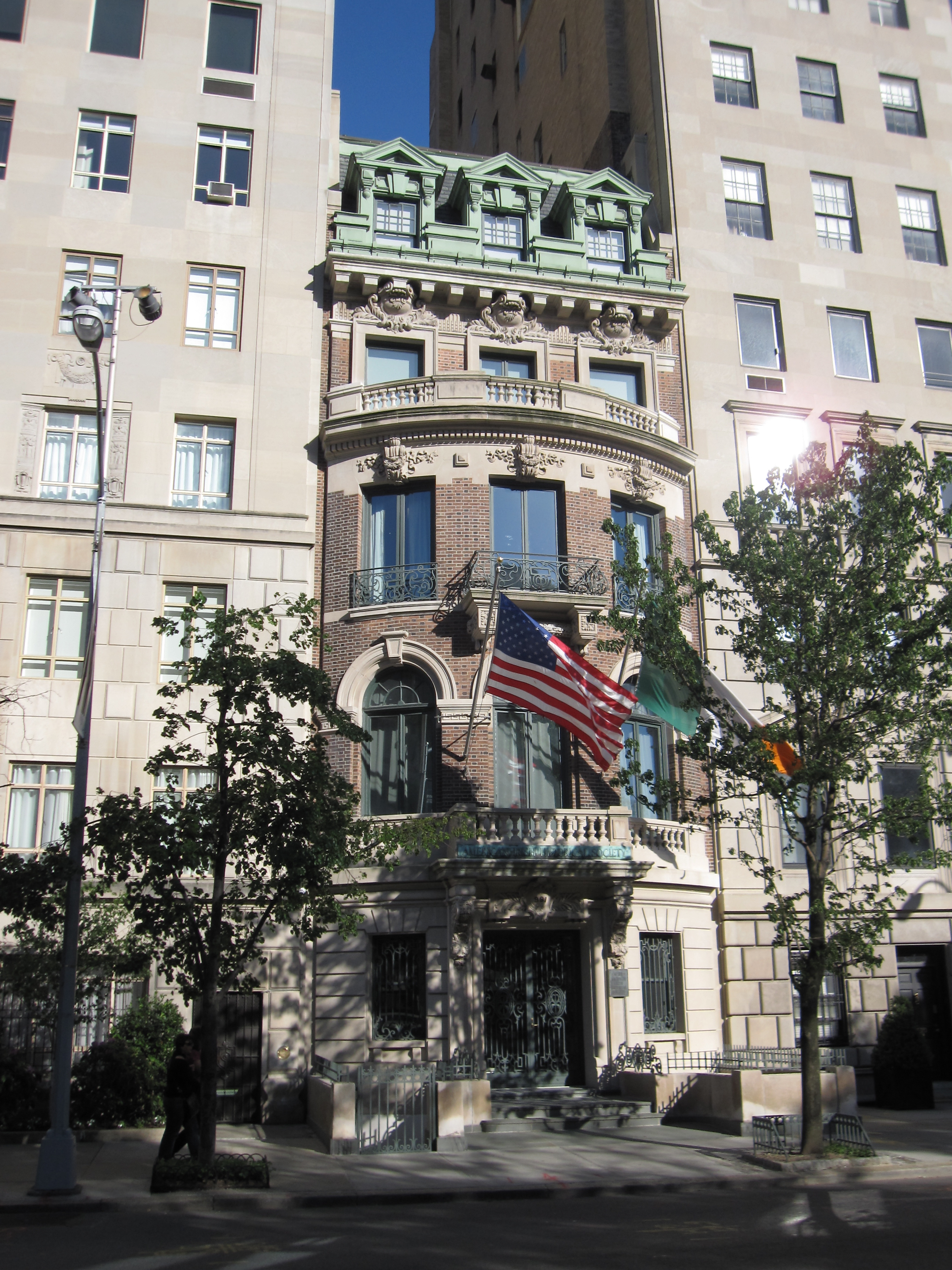
- Headquarters in Manhattan
- Abbreviation: AIHS
- Established: 1897; 129 years ago
- Founders: Thomas Bonaventure Lawler
- Legal status: Private, non-profit
- Purpose: Educational and cultural
- Headquarters: 991 Fifth Avenue, Manhattan, New York City
- Chairman: James Normile
- Publication: The Recorder
- Website: aihsny.org

The American Irish Historical Society (AIHS) is a historical society devoted to Irish American history that was founded in Boston in the late 19th century. Non-partisan and non-sectarian since its inception in 1897, it maintains the most complete private collection of Irish and Irish-American literature and history in the United States, and it publishes a journal entitled The Recorder. The society also holds various cultural events at its headquarters at 991 Fifth Avenue in New York City.

== Locations ==
Founded in Boston, Massachusetts, in the late 19th century and in continuous operation since 1897, the society has been non-partisan and non-sectarian since its inception. It was founded as a response to the establishment of the Scotch-Irish Society, which was founded in 1889. The society was relocated to New York City in 1904 by T. H. Murray, then serving as the society's Secretary-General. Perhaps the most notable member of the society at the time was President Theodore Roosevelt.

The society's formal purpose is "to place permanently on record the story of the Irish in America from the earliest settlement to the present day, justly, impartially, fully, and sympathetically correcting neglect and misrepresentation by certain historians of the part taken in the founding, upbuilding and safeguarding of the Nation by persons of Irish birth and descent." Notable members through the years have included politician William Bourke Cockran, tenor John McCormack, New York Governor Hugh Carey, and performer/composer George M. Cohan.

In 1939, the society bought a Beaux-Arts townhouse on Fifth Avenue in New York City, which it still occupies. The society's headquarters is at 991 Fifth Avenue, opposite the Metropolitan Museum of Art.

== 21st century ==
As of 2011, members included "prominent doctors, writers, lawyers and even some boldface names like Liam Neeson." It continued to hold a "vast collection of rare books" and hold various cultural events such as poetry readings and concerts. In early 2011, New York Mayor Michael Bloomberg apologized publicly after joking at a dinner that he'd seen a bunch of people "totally inebriated” hanging from the society's balcony on St. Patrick's Day. The comment spurred complaints about Irish stereotyping. The New York Times published an article stating Bloomberg "could hardly have picked a more unlikely [stereotyping] target," with locals feeling "surprise and puzzlement that the carefully preserved building and its staid crowd had been singled out as an emblem for, of all things, rowdiness."

Kevin M. Cahill (1936–2022) was president-general emeritus of the society. He died in 2022. The current chairman of the board is James Normile. With around 10,000 volumes, it "maintains the most complete private collection of Irish-American and Irish literature and history in the United States." The society publishes a journal entitled The Recorder and hosts cultural and historical events.

During the holiday seasons of 2016 and 2017, AIHS was home to the Irish Repertory Theatre's production of The Dead, 1904. The show was an adaptation of James Joyce's "The Dead", adapted by novelist Jean Hanff Korelitz and her husband, Irish poet Paul Muldoon. For The Dead, 1904, the building had 57 guests at a time, who for part of the performance joined the cast for a holiday feast drawn from the original novella. The Dead, 1904, continued to run until 2018.

In January 2021, the headquarters was placed on sale for $52 million "to best enable the Society to pursue its cultural and scholarly mission in a sustainable manner." However, The New York Times subsequently reported that AIHS had encountered organizational and financial difficulties in the preceding years, exacerbated by restrictions related to the COVID-19 pandemic during 2020. Among those who objected to the proposed sale was Simon Coveney, the Foreign Affairs and Defence minister for Ireland's parliament. After lowering the price several times, the building was ultimately taken off the market.

In December 2022, New York Attorney General Letitia James announced a plan to revitalize the Society in collaboration with the Consulate General of Ireland, SeaChange Capital Partners, and an interim Board of Directors. In September 2023, a permanent Board of Directors was appointed, alongside a new executive director in November 2023, structuring an optimistic path forward for the Society's future. ″Dr. Elizabeth Stack, a native of Kerry, is the former executive director of the Irish American Heritage Museum in Albany and took up her role in the AIHS at the beginning of February. (Dr. Stack)... has promised full transparency as the society attempts to rebuild public trust following a turbulent and controversial period in its history. Speaking from a makeshift office on the ground floor of the stunning townhouse, Stack said there were dozens of small jobs to be completed before the Society could open to academics and the general public.

== AIHS Gold Medal ==
The American Irish Historical Society annually awards the AIHS Gold Medal to an Irish-American or Irish national of significant accomplishment. Past honorees have included Bono, George J. Mitchell, Mary Higgins Clark, Wilbur Ross, Robert M. Devlin, Michael J. Dowling, and Robert McCann.
