= Embassy of Japan, Dublin =

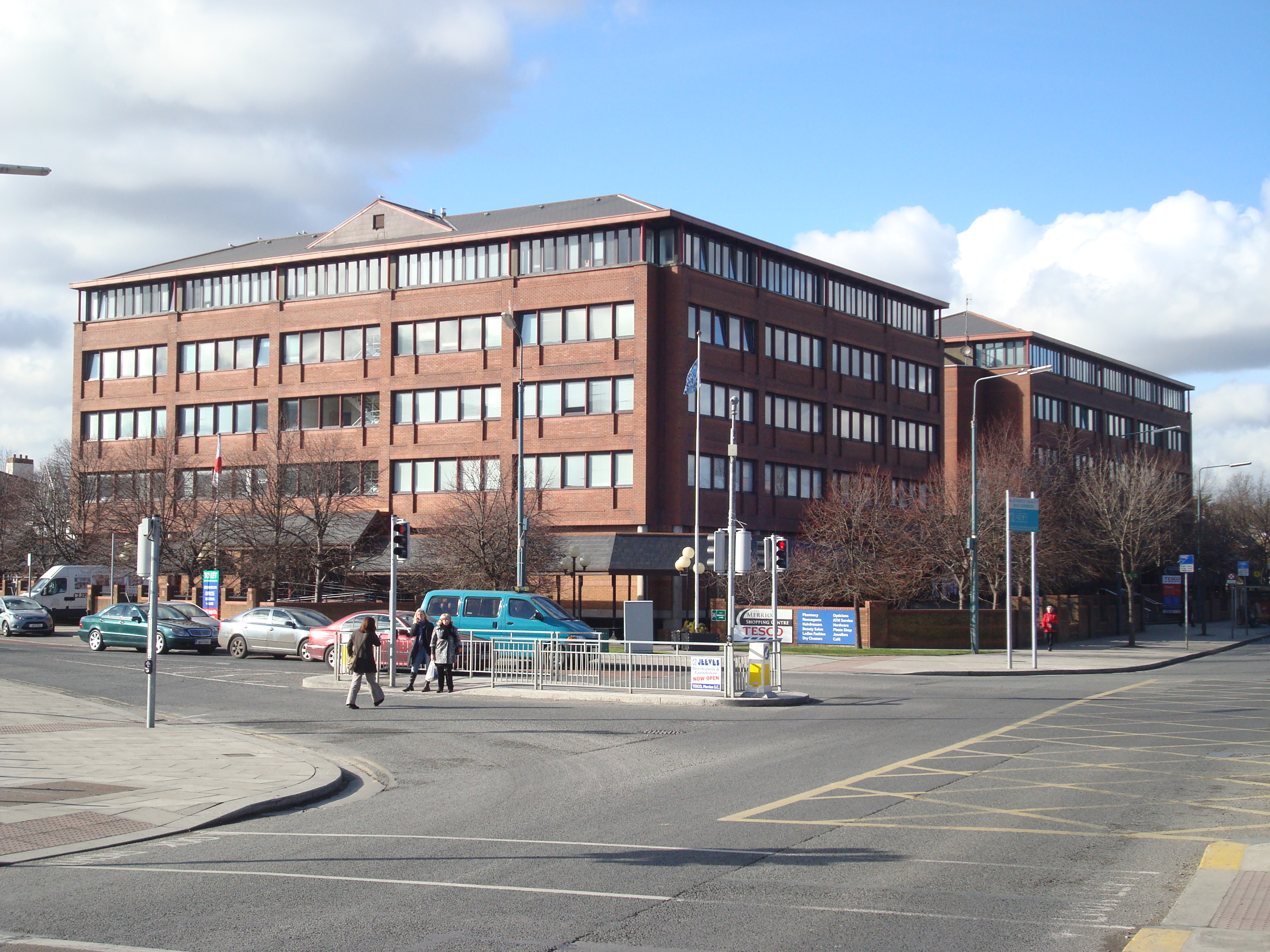
- The building containing the Japanese Embassy.
- Location: (Republic of Ireland) Merrion, Dublin
- Address: Nutley Building, Merrion Centre, Nutley Lane, Dublin 4
- Coordinates: 53°19′7.2″N 6°12′48.5″W
- Ambassador: Norio Maruyama
- Website: Embassy of Japan in Ireland

The Embassy of Japan in Dublin (Japanese: 在アイルランド日本国大使館) is the diplomatic mission of Japan in Ireland. It is located in the capital city of Ireland, Dublin.

As of February 2026, the current Japanese Ambassador to Ireland is Miyagawa Manabu.

== Diplomatic relations ==
Relations between Japan and Ireland were formally formed in 1957 when Japan established a legation in Dublin after Ireland's separation from the British Commonwealth in 1949.

This legation was promoted to an embassy in 1964.

== See also ==
- Ireland–Japan relations
- Foreign relations of Ireland
- List of diplomatic missions in Ireland
