= List of diplomatic missions in Ireland =

This article lists embassies accredited in Ireland. There are currently 71 embassies in Dublin.

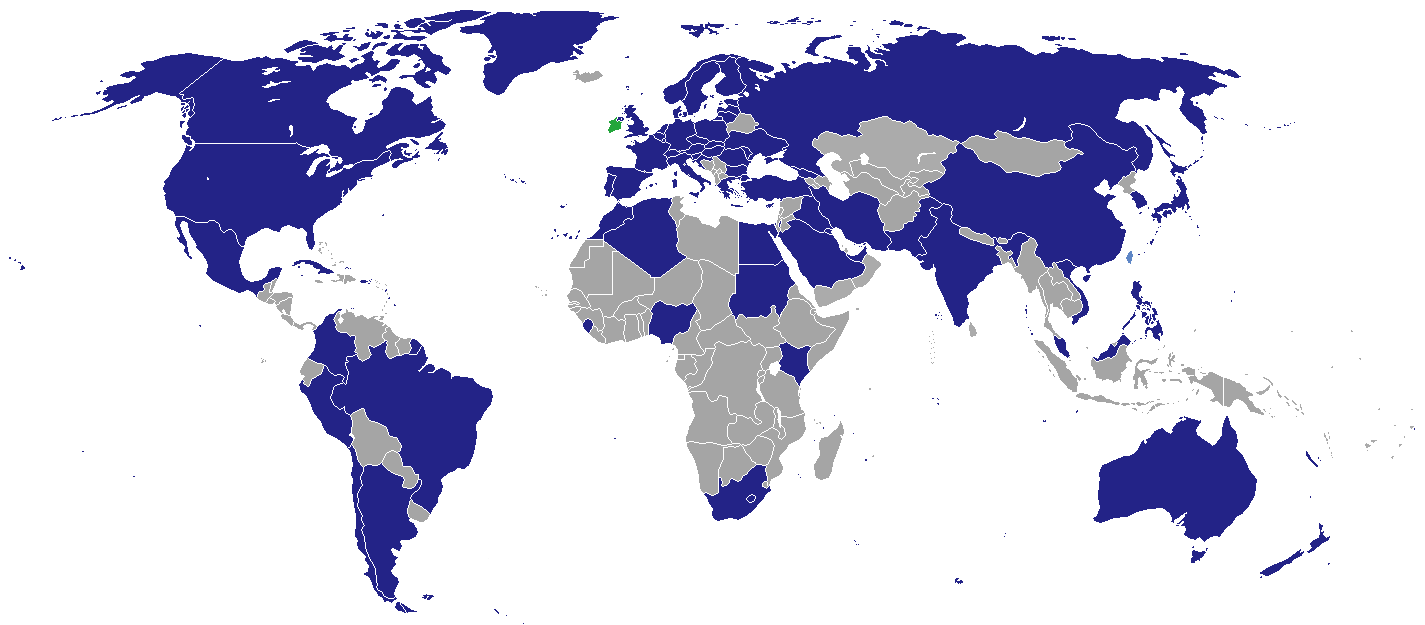
Diplomatic missions in Ireland

== Diplomatic missions in Dublin ==
=== Embassies ===
1. Algeria
2. Argentina
3. Australia
4. Austria
5. Bangladesh
6. Barbados
7. Belgium
8. Brazil
9. Bulgaria
10. Canada
11. Chile
12. China
13. Colombia
14. Croatia
15. Cuba
16. Cyprus
17. Czech Republic
18. Denmark
19. Egypt
20. Estonia
21. Finland
22. France
23. Georgia
24. Germany
25. Greece
26. Holy See
27. Hungary
28. India
29. Iran
30. Iraq
31. Italy
32. Japan
33. Kenya
34. Kuwait
35. Latvia
36. Lesotho
37. Lithuania
38. Luxembourg
39. Malaysia
40. Malta
41. Mexico
42. Moldova
43. Morocco
44. Netherlands
45. New Zealand
46. Nigeria
47. Norway
48. Pakistan
49. Palestine
50. Peru
51. Philippines
52. Poland
53. Portugal
54. Romania
55. Russia
56. Saudi Arabia
57. Sierra Leone
58. Slovakia
59. Slovenia
60. South Africa
61. South Korea
62. Spain
63. Sudan
64. Sweden
65. Switzerland
66. Turkey
67. Ukraine
68. United Arab Emirates
69. United Kingdom
70. United States
71. Vietnam

=== Other missions ===
1. Republic of China (Taiwan) (representative office)

== Non-resident embassies accredited to Ireland ==
=== Resident in London, United Kingdom ===
1. Afghanistan
2. Angola
3. Albania
4. Angola
5. Antigua and Barbuda
6. Armenia
7. Azerbaijan
8. Bahamas
9. Bahrain
10. Belarus
11. Belize
12. Bolivia
13. Bosnia and Herzegovina
14. Botswana
15. Brunei
16. Burundi
17. Cambodia
18. Costa Rica
19. Congo-Brazzaville
20. Congo-Kinshasa
21. Dominican Republic
22. Ecuador
23. El Salvador
24. Eritrea
25. Ethiopia
26. Fiji
27. Gabon
28. Gambia
29. Ghana
30. Grenada
31. Guatemala
32. Guinea
33. Guyana
34. Honduras
35. Iceland
36. Indonesia
37. Ivory Coast
38. Jamaica
39. Jordan
40. Kazakhstan
41. Kosovo
42. Laos
43. Lebanon
44. Liberia
45. Libya
46. Madagascar
47. Malawi
48. Maldives
49. Mauritius
50. Mongolia
51. Montenegro
52. Mozambique
53. Myanmar
54. Namibia
55. Nepal
56. North Korea
57. North Macedonia
58. Oman
59. Panama
60. Paraguay
61. Qatar
62. Rwanda
63. Saint Kitts and Nevis
64. Saint Vincent and the Grenadines
65. Senegal
66. Serbia
67. Seychelles
68. Singapore
69. Sri Lanka
70. Syria
71. Tajikistan
72. Tanzania
73. Thailand
74. Timor-Leste
75. Togo
76. Trinidad and Tobago
77. Tunisia
78. Uganda
79. Uruguay
80. Uzbekistan
81. Venezuela
82. Zambia
83. Zimbabwe

=== Resident elsewhere ===
1. Andorra (Andorra la Vella)
2. Benin (Paris)
3. Burkina Faso (Brussels)
4. San Marino (City of San Marino)
5. Somalia (Brussels)

== Closed embassies ==
Host city	Sending country	Mission	Year closed	Ref.
Dublin	Ethiopia	Embassy	2021	
Dublin	Ghana	Embassy	2009	
Dublin	Israel	Embassy	2024	

== Embassies to open ==
- Libya
- Qatar

== See also ==
- Foreign relations of Ireland
- List of diplomatic missions of Ireland
- Visa requirements for Irish citizens
