= Embassy of the United Kingdom, Dublin =

Chief diplomatic mission of the United Kingdom in Ireland

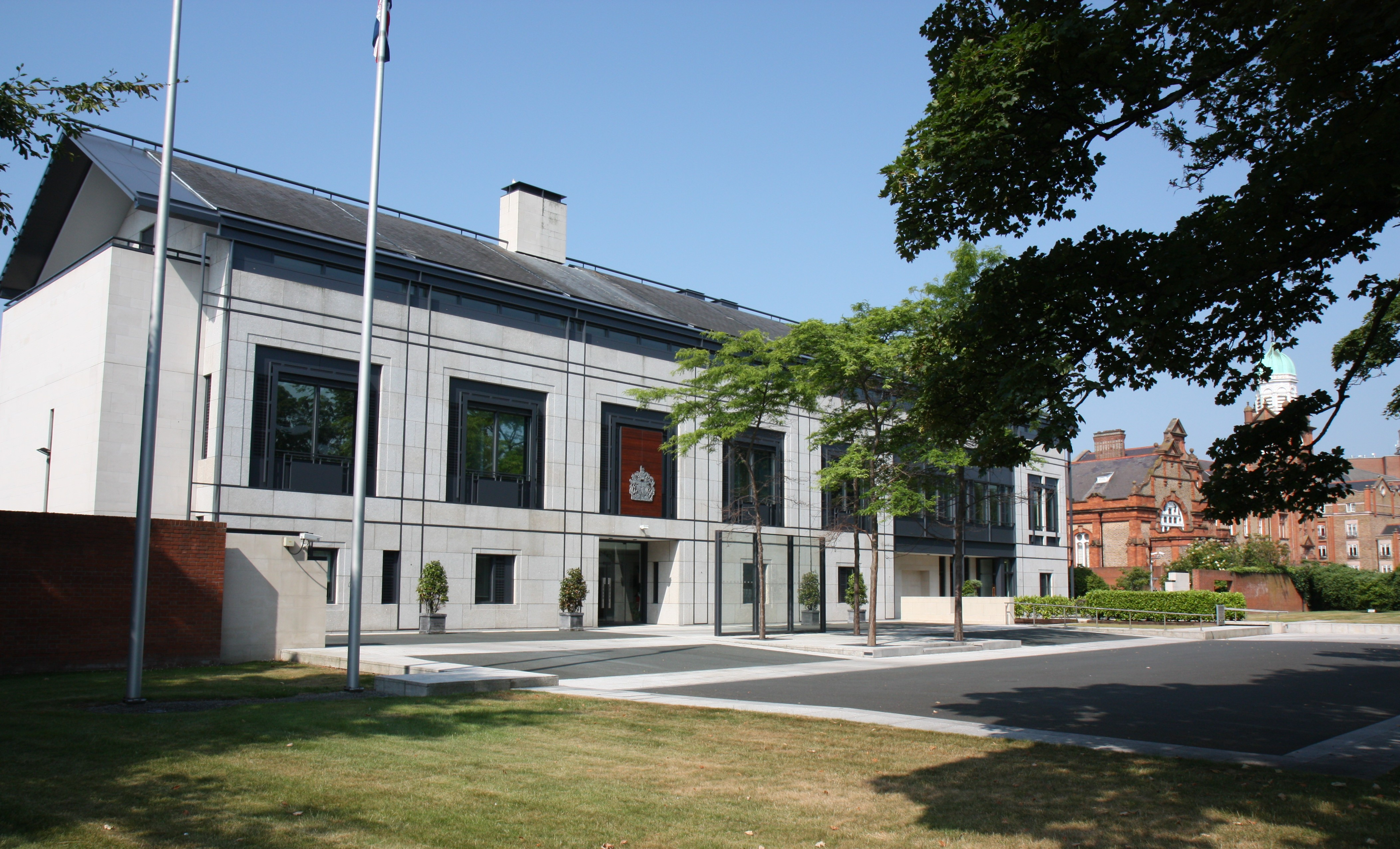
Embassy of the United Kingdom, Dublin
- Location: Ballsbridge, Dublin
- Address: 29 Merrion Road, Ballsbridge, Dublin 4, D04 P272, Ireland
- Coordinates: 53.3251°N 6.2238°W
- Ambassador: Kara Owen
- Website: British Embassy, Dublin

The Embassy of the United Kingdom in Dublin is the chief diplomatic mission of the United Kingdom of Great Britain and Northern Ireland in Ireland. Its chancery is located on Merrion Road in the Ballsbridge area of the city. The current British Ambassador to Ireland is Kara Owen.

== History ==
Although the Irish Free State was established in 1922, the United Kingdom did not have a diplomatic mission of its own. The only British representation in the State was that of the Trade Commissioner, first appointed in 1929.

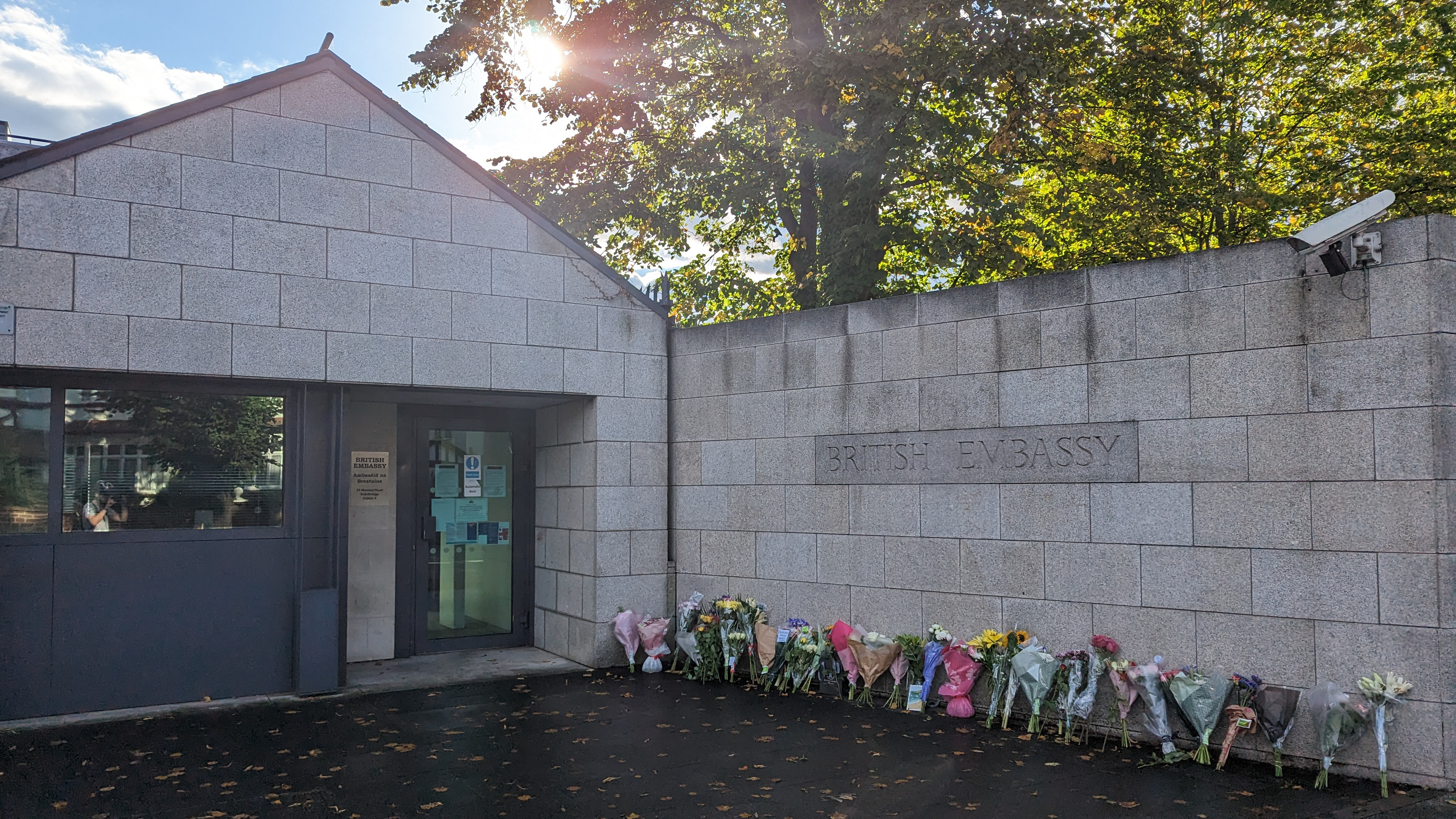
The British Embassy's front gate, as seen from Merrion Road.

By contrast, the Irish High Commission (now the Embassy of Ireland) in London was established as early as 1923.

It was not until 1939 that a separate mission, known as the British Representative's Office, was finally established. Following the passing of the Republic of Ireland Act by the Oireachtas in 1948, under which Ireland withdrew from the Commonwealth the following year, the mission was renamed the British Embassy, with its head restyled Ambassador.

Until 1972, the embassy was located at 39 Merrion Square, on the southside of Dublin city centre. On 2 February of that year, it was burnt to the ground with petrol bombs during demonstrations by large crowds of people. This occurred following the Bloody Sunday massacre in Derry on 30 January, where the British Army's Parachute Regiment shot and killed fourteen unarmed Catholic civilians during a civil rights demonstration.

In 1981, protesters tried to storm the British Embassy in response to the IRA hunger strikes of that year.

The current embassy building on Merrion Road was built in 1995 and designed by Allies and Morrison. It is built around a central courtyard, a cloister-like space.

Following the death of Queen Elizabeth II on 8 September 2022, the President of Ireland Michael D. Higgins, accompanied by Taoiseach Micheál Martin and Foreign Affairs Minister Simon Coveney, attended the British Embassy in Dublin to sign their condolences.

== Ambassador's residence ==
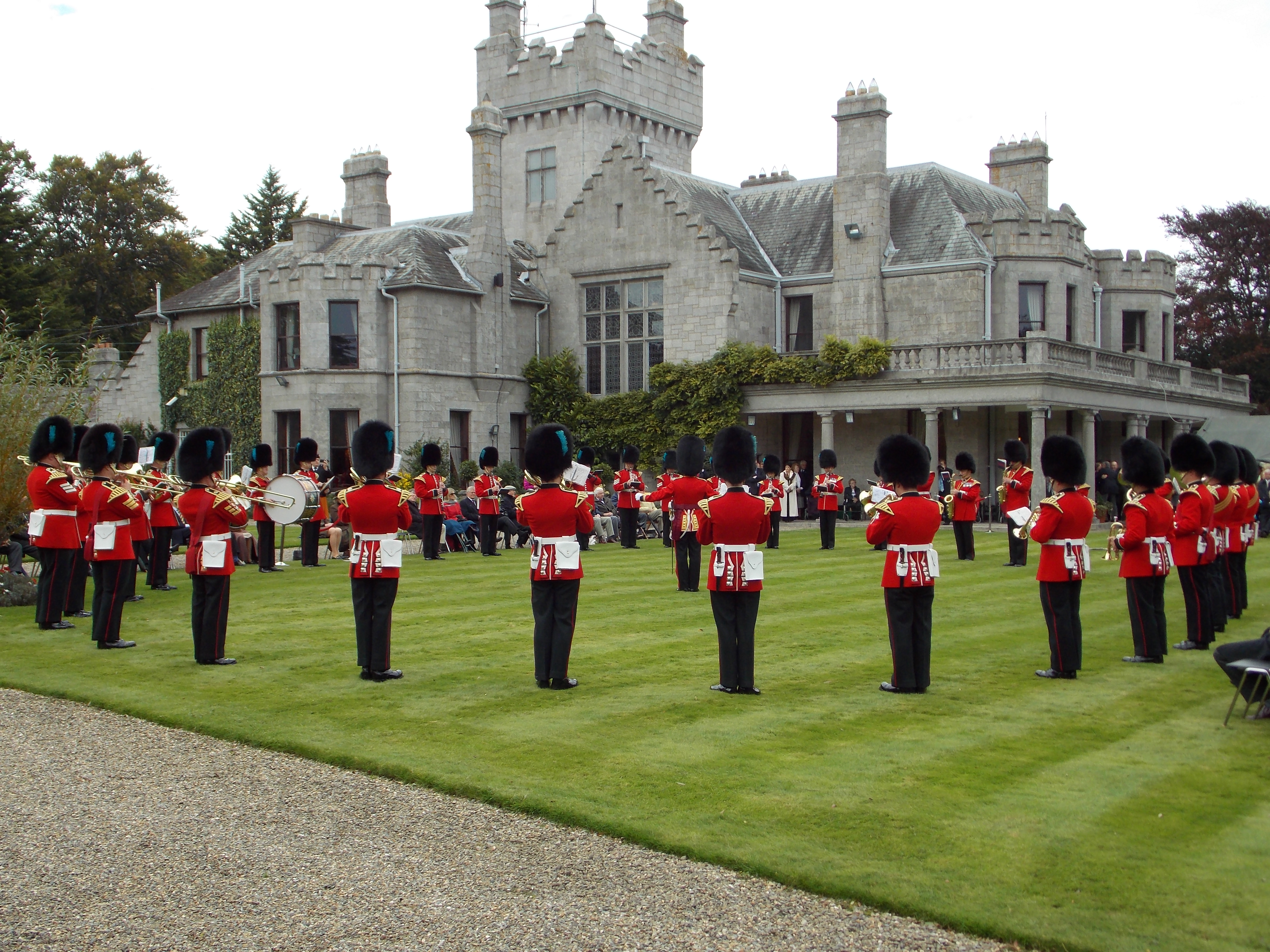
British Ambassador's residence, Glencairn House

The British Ambassador's official residence in Dublin is Glencairn House, located on Murphystown Road. Glencairn House has been the official residence of successive British Ambassadors to Ireland since the 1950s.

== See also ==
- Burning of British Embassy
- Ireland–United Kingdom relations
- List of diplomatic missions in Ireland
- List of Ambassadors of the United Kingdom to Ireland
