= Ireland–United Kingdom relations =

Ireland–United Kingdom Relations
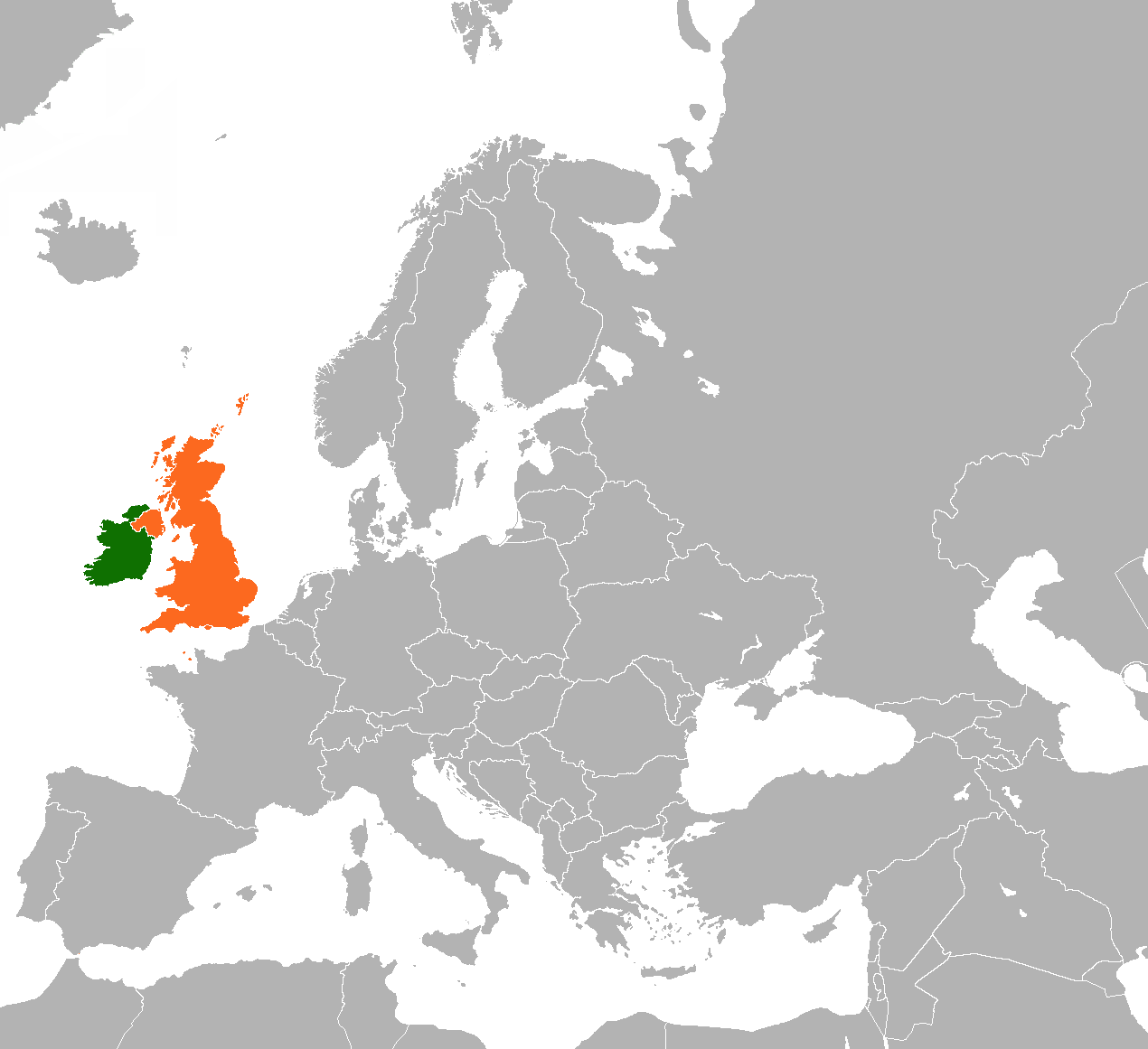

- Ireland: United Kingdom

Diplomatic mission
- Irish Embassy, London: British Embassy, Dublin

Envoy
- Ambassador Martin Fraser: Ambassador Kara Owen

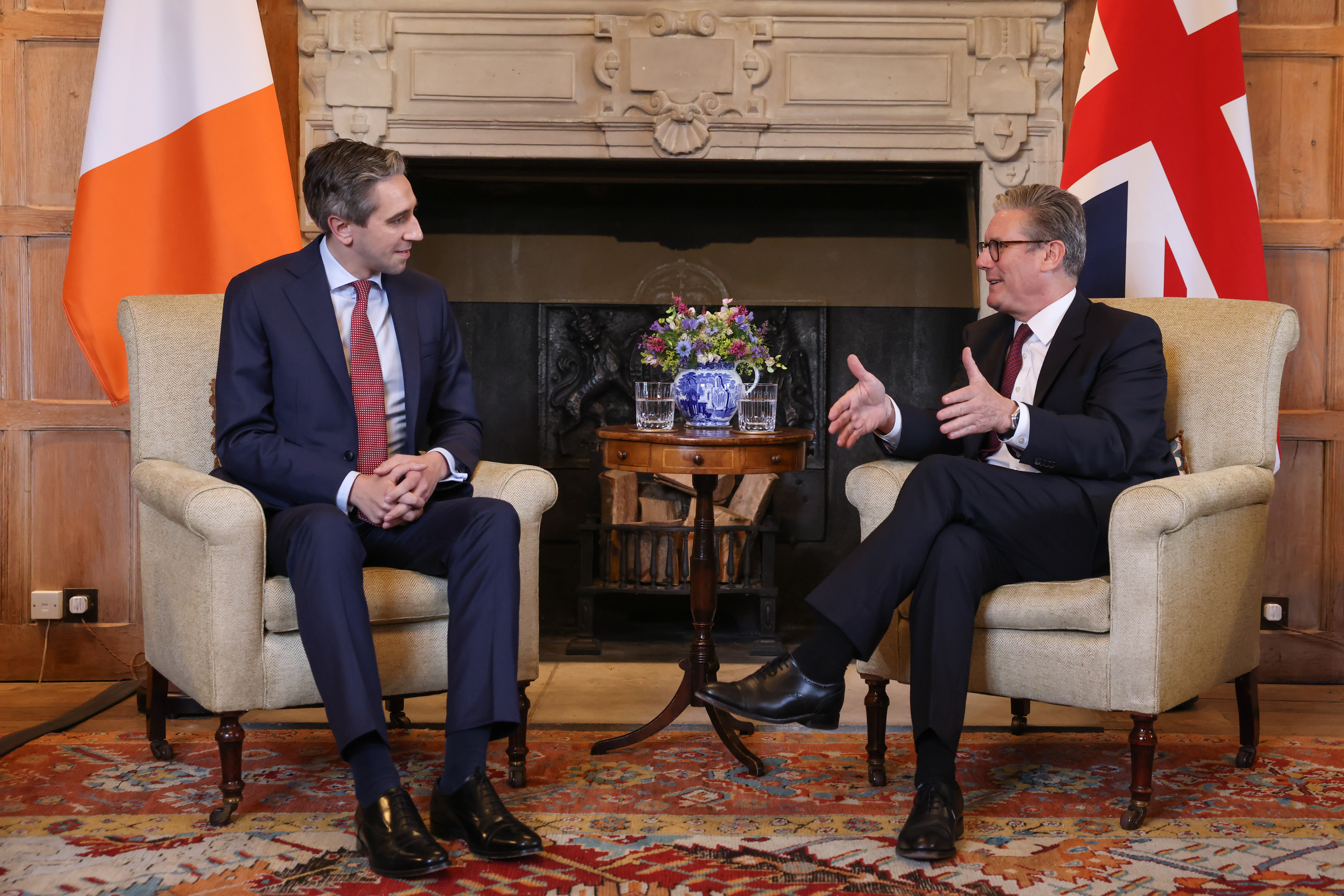
Irish Taoiseach Simon Harris and UK Prime Minister Keir Starmer in July 2024

The Republic of Ireland and the United Kingdom of Great Britain and Northern Ireland maintain international relations. British rule in Ireland dates back to the Anglo-Norman invasion on behalf of the English king in the 12th century. Most of Ireland gained independence from the United Kingdom following the Anglo-Irish War in the early 20th century.

Historically, relations between the two states have been influenced heavily by issues arising from the partition of Ireland and the terms of Ireland's secession, its constitutional relationship with and obligations to the UK after independence, and the outbreak of political violence in Northern Ireland. Additionally, the high level of trade between the two states, their proximate geographic location, their common status as islands in the European Union until Britain's departure, common language and close cultural and personal links mean political developments in both states often closely follow each other.

Irish and British citizens are accorded equivalent reciprocal rights and entitlements (with a small number of minor exceptions), and a Common Travel Area exists between Ireland, the United Kingdom, and the Crown Dependencies. The British–Irish Intergovernmental Conference acts as an official forum for co-operation between the Government of Ireland and the Government of the United Kingdom on matters of mutual interest generally, and with respect to Northern Ireland in particular. Two other bodies, the British–Irish Council and the British–Irish Parliamentary Assembly act as a forum for discussion between the executives and assemblies, respectively, of the region, including the devolved nations and regions in the UK and the three Crown dependencies. Co-operation between Northern Ireland and Ireland, including the execution of common policies in certain areas, occurs through the North/South Ministerial Council. In 2014, the UK Prime Minister David Cameron, and the Irish Taoiseach Enda Kenny described the relationship between the two countries as being at 'an all time high'.

Both Ireland and the United Kingdom joined the European Union (then the European Communities) in 1973. However, the three Crown dependencies remained outside of the EU. In June 2016, the UK held a referendum in which a majority voted to leave the EU. Brexit became effective on 31 January 2020, with a deal being reached on 24 December, keeping Northern Ireland in the European Union Single Market for goods and keeping a free border between the Republic of Ireland and Northern Ireland. Relations between both sides became strained after the requested implementation of the Northern Ireland Protocol on 1 January 2021, which is strongly opposed by British citizens in Northern Ireland, the EU and the Irish government. Many Irish citizens in Northern Ireland saw Britain's withdrawal from the EU as a threat to the peace process and cross-border relations, especially as a majority of the NI electorate voted to remain in the EU. As a result of the tensions over the protocol, in February 2022, the DUP collapsed the Northern Ireland Assembly and Executive in protest, seeking a renegotiation of the deal. Consequently, Northern Ireland was left without a devolved executive government until February 2024, when the DUP re-entered following modifications to the protocol. This allowed a new NI Executive to be elected, with Michelle O'Neill of Sinn Fein becoming First Minister, alongside Emma Little-Pengelly of the DUP as deputy First Minister.

The three devolved governments of Scotland, Wales and Northern Ireland, and the three dependencies of the British Crown, the Isle of Man, Jersey and Guernsey, also participate in multilateral bodies created between the two states, such as the British Irish Council and the British-Irish Parliamentary Assembly.

== Country comparison ==
Official Name	Ireland / Éire	United Kingdom of Great Britain and Northern Ireland
Common Name	Ireland	United Kingdom / Britain
Flag	Republic of Ireland	United Kingdom
Coat of Arms		
Anthem	Amhrán na bhFiann	God Save the King
Capital	Dublin	London
Official languages	Irish (36%); English (99%) (Both de facto and de jure)	English (98%) (de facto)
Ethnic groups	91.7% White (82.2% White Irish, 9.5% Other White), 1.7% Asian, 1.3% Black, 1.5% Other, 2.6% Not Stated, 0.7% Irish Traveller, 0.4% Chinese (2016 Census)	87% White (81.9% White British), 7% Asian, 3% Black, 2% Mixed Race, 1% Others (2011 Census)
Main religions	78.3% Catholic, 10.1% Non-religious, 4.2% Protestant; 1.3% Islam, 6.1% Other Christians and other religions.	59.3% Christianity, 25.1% Non-religious, 7.2% Unstated, 4.8% Islam, 1.5% Hinduism, 0.8% Sikhism, 0.5% Judaism, 0.4% Buddhism
Government	Unitary parliamentary constitutional republic	Unitary parliamentary constitutional monarchy
Legislature	Oireachtas	Parliament of the United Kingdom
Head of state	Catherine Connolly, President	Charles III, King
Head of government	Micheál Martin, Taoiseach	Andy Burnham, Prime Minister
Population	5,148,139 (2022 census)	65,110,000 (2016 estimate)
Area	70,273 km^{2} (27,133 sq mi)	243,610 km^{2} (94,060 sq mi )
Population density	67.7/km^{2} (175.3/sq mi)	255.6/km^{2} (662.0/sq mi)
Largest city	Dublin – 553,165 (1,904,806 Metro)	London – 8,673,713 (13,879,757 Metro)
GDP (PPP)	$848 billion, $159,129 per capita	$4.720 trillion, $67,585 per capita
GDP (nominal)	$779 billion, $140,186 per capita	$4.264 trillion, $61,056 per capita
Expatriate populations	503,288 Irish born people live in the UK (2015 UN Estimate)	250,000 British-born people live in Ireland (2015)
Military	Defence Forces (Ireland)	British Armed Forces
Military expenditures	$1.35 billion	$62.7 billion

== History ==
There have been relations between the people inhabiting the British Isles since the earliest recorded history of the region. A Romano-Briton, Patricius, later known as Saint Patrick, brought Christianity to Ireland and, following the Fall of the Western Roman Empire, missionaries from Ireland re-introduced Christianity to Britain.

The expansion of Gaelic culture into what became known as Scotland (after the Latin Scoti, meaning Gaels) brought close political and familial ties between people in Ireland and people in Great Britain, lasting from the Early Middle Ages to the 17th century, including a common Gaelic language spoken on both islands. Norse-Gaels in the Kingdom of Dublin and Norman invasion of Ireland added religious, political, economic and social ties between Northumbria and Wales with Leinster in the Pale, the Isle of Man and Galloway, including Hiberno-English.

During the Tudor dynasty, the English regained control and in 1541 Henry VIII was crowned King of Ireland. The English Reformation in the 16th century increased the antagonism between England and Ireland, as the Irish remained Catholic, which became a justification for the English to oppress the Irish. In Ireland, during the Tudor and Stuart eras, the English Crown initiated a large-scale colonization of Ireland with Protestant settlers from Britain, particularly in the province of Ulster. These settlers became the economically and politically dominant land-owning class that would dominate Ireland for centuries. In reaction, there were a number of anti-English rebellions, such as the Desmond Rebellions and the Nine Years' War.

=== 17th century ===
War and colonisation made Ireland completely subject to growing British colonial powers in the early 17th century. Forced settlement of newly conquered land and inequitable laws defined life for the Irish under British rule. England had previously conquered Scotland and Wales, leaving many people from western Scotland to seek opportunity in settling about 500,000 acres of newly seized land in Ireland. Some Irish people were displaced to an attempted "reservation". This resulted in Gaelic ties between Scotland and Ireland withering dramatically over the course of the 17th century, including a divergence in the Gaelic language into two distinct languages.

In 1641, the Irish were finally able to drive out the English for a short time through a successful rebellion and proclaim the Irish Catholic Confederation, which was allied with the Royalists in the English Civil War. Oliver Cromwell succeeded in reconquering Ireland by brutal methods and by 1652 all of Ireland was under English control. Cromwell then granted land in Ireland to his followers and the Catholic aristocracy in Ireland was increasingly dispossessed. Cromwell exiled numerous Catholics to Connacht and up to 40 percent of Ireland's population died as a result of the English invasion. The defeat of the Jacobites at the Battle of the Boyne in 1690 further reinforced the Protestant Ascendancy in Ireland.

=== 1782–1918 ===
Although Ireland gained near-independence from Great Britain in 1782, there were revolutionary movements in the 1790s that favoured France, Britain's great enemy. Secret societies staged the failed 1798 Rebellion. Therefore the kingdoms of Great Britain and Ireland were merged in 1801 to form the United Kingdom of Great Britain and Ireland.

On 1 January 1801, Great Britain and Ireland joined to form the United Kingdom of Great Britain and Ireland. The Act of Union 1800 was passed in both the Parliament of Great Britain and the Parliament of Ireland, dominated by the Protestant Ascendancy and lacking representation of the country's Roman Catholic population. Substantial majorities were achieved, and according to contemporary documents this was assisted by bribery in the form of the awarding of peerages and honours to opponents to gain their votes.

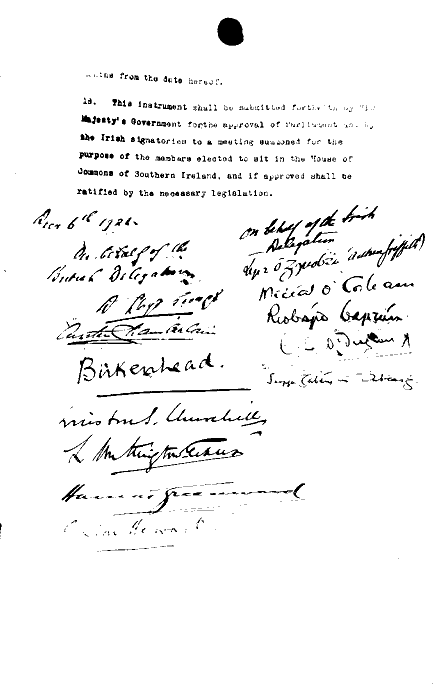
The signatures page of the 1922 Anglo-Irish Treaty, signed showing the signatures of the British and Irish delegation

The separate Parliaments of Great Britain and Ireland were now abolished, and replaced by a united Parliament of the United Kingdom. Ireland thus became an integral part of the United Kingdom, sending around 100 MPs to the House of Commons at Westminster and 28 Irish representative peers to the House of Lords, elected from among their number by the Irish peers themselves, except that Roman Catholic peers were not permitted to take their seats in the Lords. Part of the trade-off for the Irish Catholics was to be the granting of Catholic emancipation, which had been fiercely resisted by the all-Anglican Irish Parliament. However, this was blocked by King George III, who argued that emancipating the Roman Catholics would breach his Coronation Oath. The Catholic hierarchy had endorsed the Union. However the decision to block Catholic emancipation fatally undermined the appeal of the Union. The slow emancipation of Catholics in Ireland began later the early 1800s.

British oppression led to increasing impoverishment and depopulation of Ireland (the island had still not returned to its 1800 population by the early 21st century). Between 1845 and 1849, Ireland experienced the Great Famine. While some have described British actions as deliberate, most historians view it as a catastrophe made worse by government inaction and harmful policies. However, the British government, in keeping with its laissez-faire ideology, refused to intervene and help the Irish. Also, grain from Ireland continued to be exported abroad, exacerbating the famine. One million Irish died and many emigrated. Ireland's demographics never recovered from this, as large numbers of Irish continued to move away (mainly to the US). The famine and its aftermath led to lasting bitterness in Ireland and increased the desire for self-determination.

In 1873, the Home Rule League was formed, which sought Irish Home Rule. After another famine in 1879, the Irish Land League was formed, which opposed the oppression of the Irish peasantry. The struggle for Irish self-determination was also supported by the Irish diaspora in the United States, where the militant Fenian Brotherhood attacked British North America. Irish nationalists in the House of Commons exerted increasing pressure on British policy. In 1886 and 1893, two Irish Home Rule Bills were defeated in Parliament because British conservatives, together with Anglo-Irish Protestants, rejected Irish self-determination. Some concessions had to be made, however, such as land reforms in 1903 and 1909. Irish nationalism only strengthened as a result and in 1905 the militant Sinn Féin was founded by Arthur Griffith, which advocated secession from the British Empire by any means necessary.

In the 1910s, a political crisis arose in Ireland between supporters of Home Rule and its opponents, consisting of the Protestants in Ulster (Northern Ireland). In 1914, the Government of Ireland Act was finally passed, promising self-government for Ireland, but implementation had to be postponed with the start of World War I. In 1916, the Easter Rising in Ireland saw an attempt to enact Irish independence by force. The uprising was violently put down by the British, with Dublin devastated.

=== Independence 1919–1922 ===
After World War I, violent and constitutional campaigns for autonomy or independence culminated in the 1918 general election returning 73 of 105 Irish seats to Sinn Féin, who declared Irish independence from Britain and set up a parliament in Dublin, and declared the independence of Ireland from the United Kingdom. A war of independence followed that ended with the Anglo-Irish Treaty of 1921, which partitioned Ireland between the Irish Free State, which gained dominion status within the British Empire, and a devolved administration in Northern Ireland, which remained part of the UK. In 1937, Ireland declared itself fully independent of the United Kingdom and became a Republic.

== Post-independence conflicts ==
=== Boundary commission ===
The day after the establishment of the Irish Free State, the Houses of the Parliament of Northern Ireland resolved to make an address to the King so as to opt out of the Irish Free State Immediately afterwards, the need to settle an agreed border between the Irish Free State and Northern Ireland arose. In response to this issue a commission was set up involving representatives from the Government of the Irish Free State, the Government of Northern Ireland, and the Government of the United Kingdom which would chair the Commission. Ultimately and after some controversy, the present border was fixed, not by the Commission but by agreement between the United Kingdom (including Northern Ireland) and the Irish Free State.

=== Anglo-Irish Trade War ===
A further dispute arose in 1930 over the issue of the Irish government's refusal to reimburse the United Kingdom with "land annuities". These annuities were derived from government financed soft loans given to Irish tenant farmers before independence to allow them to buy out their farms from landlords (see Irish Land Acts). These loans were intended to redress the issue of landownership in Ireland arising from the wars of the 17th century. The refusal of the Irish government to pass on monies it collected from these loans to the British government led to a retaliatory and escalating trade war between the two states from 1932 until 1938, a period known as the Anglo-Irish Trade War or the Economic War.

While the UK was less affected by the Economic War, the Irish economy was virtually crippled by the resulting capital flight. Unemployment was extremely high and the effects of the Great Depression compounded the difficulties. The government urged people to support the confrontation with the UK as a national hardship to be shared by every citizen. Pressures, especially from agricultural producers in Ireland and exporters in the UK, led to an agreement between the two governments in 1938 resolving the dispute.

Many infant industries were established during this "economic war". Almost complete import substitution was achieved in many sectors behind a protective tariff barrier. These industries proved valuable during the war years as they reduced the need for imports. Under the terms of resulting Anglo-Irish Trade Agreement, all duties imposed during the previous five years were lifted but Ireland was still entitled to impose tariffs on British imports to protect new Irish "infant" industries. Ireland was to pay a one-off £10 million sum to the United Kingdom (as opposed to annual repayments of £250,000 over 47 more years). Arguably the most significant outcome, however, was the return of so-called "Treaty Ports", three ports in Ireland maintained by the UK as sovereign bases under the terms of the Anglo-Irish Treaty. The handover of these ports made it harder for Britain to ensure the safety of the Atlantic Conveys.

=== Articles 2 and 3 and the name Ireland ===
Ireland adopted a new constitution in 1937. This declared Ireland to be a sovereign, independent state, but did not explicitly declare Ireland to be a republic. However, it did change the name of the state from Irish Free State to Ireland (or Éire in the Irish language). It also contained irredentist claims on Northern Ireland, stating that the "national territory [of the Irish state] consists of the whole island of Ireland" (Article 2). This was measured in some way by Article 3, which stated that, "Pending the re-integration of the national territory ... the laws enacted by the parliament [of Ireland] shall have the like area and extent of application as the laws of Saorstat Éireann" (Saorstát Éireann is the Irish language name of the Irish Free State).

The United Kingdom initially accepted the change in the name to Ireland. However, it subsequently changed its practice and passed legislation providing that the Irish state could be called Eire (notably without a fada) in British law. For some time, the United Kingdom was supported by some other Commonwealth countries. However, by the mid-1960s, Ireland was the accepted diplomatic name of the Irish state.

As a consequence of the Northern Ireland peace process, Articles 2 and 3 were changed in 1999 formalising shared Irish and British citizenship in Northern Ireland, removing the irredentist claim and making provisions for common "[institutions] with executive powers and functions ... in respect of all or any part of the island."

=== Abdication crisis and the Republic of Ireland Act ===
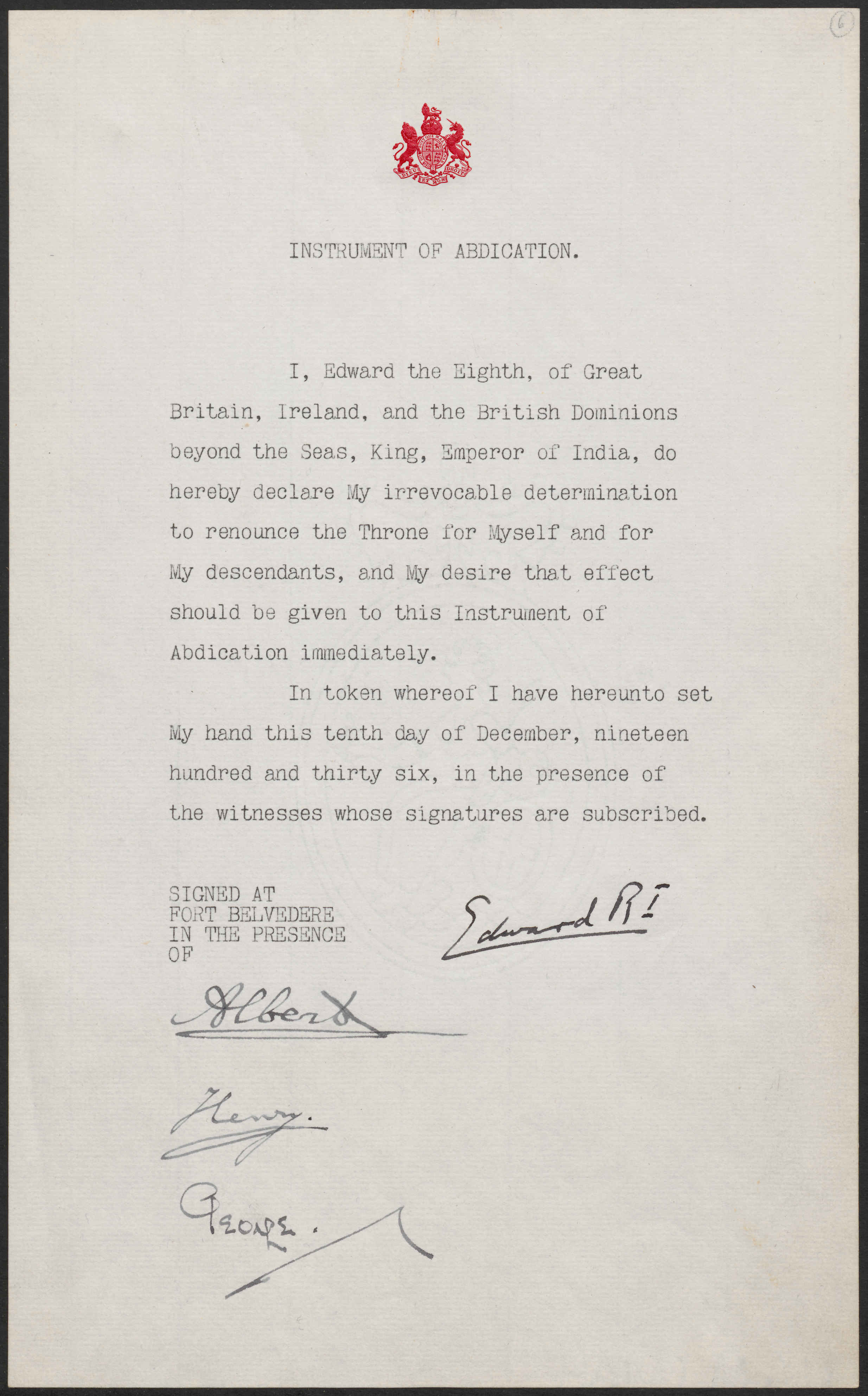
The Instrument of Abdication signed by Edward VIII and his three brothers

The Irish Free State had been governed, at least until 1936, under a form of constitutional monarchy linked to the United Kingdom. The King had a number of symbolically important duties, including exercising the executive authority of the state, appointing the cabinet and promulgating the law. However, when Edward VIII proposed to marry Wallis Simpson, an American socialite and divorcée, in 1936, it caused a constitutional crisis across the British Empire. In the chaos that ensued his abdication, the Irish Free State took the opportunity to amend its constitution and remove all of the functions of the King except one: that of representing the state abroad.

In 1937, a new constitution was adopted which entrenched the monarch's diminished role by transferring many of the functions performed by the King until 1936 to a new office of the President of Ireland, who was declared to "take precedence over all other persons in the State". However, the 1937 constitution did not explicitly declare that the state was a republic, nor that the President was head of state. Without explicit mention, the King continued to retain his role in external relations and the Irish Free State continued to be regarded as a member of the British Commonwealth and to be associated with the United Kingdom.

During the period from December 1936 to April 1949, it was unclear whether or not the Irish state was a republic or a form of constitutional monarchy and (from 1937) whether its head of state was the President of Ireland (Douglas Hyde until 1945, and Seán T. O'Kelly afterwards) or the King of Ireland (George VI). The exact constitutional status of the state during this period has been a matter of scholarly and political dispute.

The state's ambiguous status ended in 1949, when the Republic of Ireland Act stripped the King of his role in external relations and declared that the state may be described as the Republic of Ireland. The decision to do so was sudden and unilateral. However, it did not result in greatly strained relations between Ireland and the United Kingdom. The question of the head of the Irish state from 1936 to 1949 was largely a matter of symbolism and had little practical significance. The UK response was to legislate that it would not grant Northern Ireland to the Irish state without the consent of the Parliament of Northern Ireland (which was unlikely to happen in unionist-majority Northern Ireland).

One practical implication of explicitly declaring the state to be a republic in 1949 was that it automatically terminated the state's membership of the British Commonwealth, in accordance with the rules in operation at the time. However, despite this, the United Kingdom legislated that Irish citizens would retain similar rights to Commonwealth subjects and were not to be regarded as foreigners.

The Republic of Ireland Act came into force on 18 April 1949. Ten days later, 28 April 1949, the rules of the Commonwealth of Nations were changed through the London Declaration so that, when India declared itself a republic, it would not have to leave. The prospect of Ireland rejoining the Commonwealth, even today, is still occasionally raised but has never been formally considered by the Irish government.

=== Toponyms ===
A minor, though recurring, source of antagonism between Britain and Ireland is the name of the archipelago in which they both are located. Known as the British Isles in Britain, this name is opposed by most in Ireland and its use is objected to by the Irish Government.

A spokesman for the Irish Embassy in London recently said, "The British Isles has a dated ring to it, as if we are still part of the Empire. We are independent, we are not part of Britain, not even in geographical terms. We would discourage its usage [sic].".

No consensus on another name for the islands exists. In practice, the two Governments and the shared institutions of the archipelago avoid use of the term, frequently using the more appropriate term these islands in place of any term.

=== The Troubles ===
1970 US newsreel about the background of the Troubles

Political violence broke out in Northern Ireland in 1968 following clashes over a civil rights campaign. The civil rights campaign demanding an end to institutionalised discrimination against nationalists by the unionist Government of Northern Ireland. As the violence escalated, rioting and attacks by nationalist and unionist groups began to de-stabilise the province and required the presence of British troops on the ground.

In the wake of the riots, the Republic of Ireland expressed its concern about the situation. In a televised broadcast, Taoiseach Jack Lynch stated that the Irish Government could "no longer stand by" while hundreds of people were being injured. This was interpreted as a threat of military intervention.

Angry crowds burned down the British Embassy in Dublin in protest at the shooting by British troops of 13 civilians in Derry, Northern Ireland on Bloody Sunday (1972) and in 1981 protesters tried to storm the British Embassy in response to the IRA hunger strikes of that year. In 1978, the European Court of Human Rights (ECHR) trial Ireland v. the United Kingdom ruled that the techniques used in interrogating prisoners in Northern Ireland "amounted to a practice of inhuman and degrading treatment", in breach of the European Convention on Human Rights.

Throughout the conflict, the Republic of Ireland was primarily crucial for the IRA campaign against British troops and loyalist paramilitaries. (Note: "The sheer level of sympathy and support that existed for militant republicanism [in the Republic of Ireland] demonstrates that the longevity of the 'Troubles' was due in large part to this widespread tolerance and aid. Former IRA volunteers attest to in interviews and previously unpublished accounts of training camps in the Republic. Juried courts for IRA suspects were phased out as both juries and judges were regularly acquitting republicans in cases of blatant IRA activity.") Irish historian Gearóid Ó Faoleán wrote for The Irish Times that "[t]hroughout the country, republicans were as much a part of their communities as any others. Many were involved in the GAA or other local organisations and their neighbours could, to paraphrase [Irish writer Tim Pat] Coogan, quietly and approvingly mutter about the 'boys' – and then go off without a qualm the next day to vote for a political party aggressively opposed to the IRA." Shannon Airport and Cork and Cobh harbours were used extensively by the IRA for arms importation overseas during the early 1970s aided by sympathetic workers on-site. Most IRA training camps were located in the republic, as did safe houses and arms factories. The vast majority of the finances used in the IRA campaign came from criminal and legitimate activities in the Republic of Ireland rather than overseas sources. Large numbers of improvised explosive devices and firearms were manufactured by IRA members and supporters in Southern Ireland and then transported into Northern Ireland and England for use against targets in these regions. For example, one IRA arms factory near Stannaway Road, Dublin, was producing six firearms a day in 1973. An arms factory in the County Dublin village of Donabate in 1975 was described as "a centre for the manufacture of grenades, rockets and mortars." Gelignite stolen from quarries, farms and construction sites in the Republic was behind the 48,000lbs of explosives detonated in Northern Ireland in the first six months of 1973 alone. IRA training ranged from basic small arms and explosives manufacturing to heavy machine guns, overseen by Southern Irish citizens, including a former member of the Irish Defence Forces. Thousands of Irish citizens in the Republic joined the IRA throughout the conflict; for example, the assassination of Louis Mountbatten in August 1979 was carried out by IRA member Thomas McMahon from Monaghan.

An attempt by the two governments to resolve the conflict in Northern Ireland politically in 1972 through the Sunningdale Agreement failed due to opposition by hard-line factions in Northern Ireland. With no resolution to the conflict in sight, the Irish government established the New Ireland Forum in 1984 to look into solutions. While the British Prime Minister of the United Kingdom Margaret Thatcher rejected the forum's proposals, it informed the British government's opinion and it is said to have given the Irish Taoiseach Garret FitzGerald a mandate during the negotiation of the 1985 Anglo-Irish Agreement, which was directed at resolving the conflict. The 1992 Downing Street Declaration further consolidated the views of the two Governments and the 1998 Good Friday Agreement eventually formed the basis for peace in the province.

The Irish Department of Foreign Affairs established a "Reconciliation Fund" in 1982 to support organisations whose work tends to improve cross-community or North–South relations. Since 2006, the Minister for Foreign Affairs has hosted an annual "Reconciliation Networking Forum" (sometimes called the "Reconciliation Forum"; not to be confused with the Forum for Peace and Reconciliation) in Dublin to which such groups are invited.

=== Brexit ===
There is a controversy about the impact that Britain's withdrawal from the European Union will have at the end of the transition period on the border between the Republic of Ireland and Northern Ireland, in particular the impact it may have on the economy and people of the island were customs or immigration checks to be put in place at the border. It was prioritized as one of the three most important areas to resolve in order to reach the Agreement on the withdrawal of the United Kingdom from the European Union.

The people of the UK voted to leave the European Union in a non-binding referendum on 23 June 2016, an act which would effectively make the Republic of Ireland-Northern Ireland border an external EU border. Due to the lack of supporting legislation, all referendums in the UK are not legally binding, which was confirmed by a Supreme Court judge in November 2016. Nevertheless, the UK government chose to proceed with the departure from the European Union. All parties have stated that they want to avoid a hard border in Ireland particularly due to the sensitive nature of the border. The border issue is concerned by a protocol related to the withdrawal agreement, known as the Protocol on Ireland and Northern Ireland.

== Good Friday Agreement ==
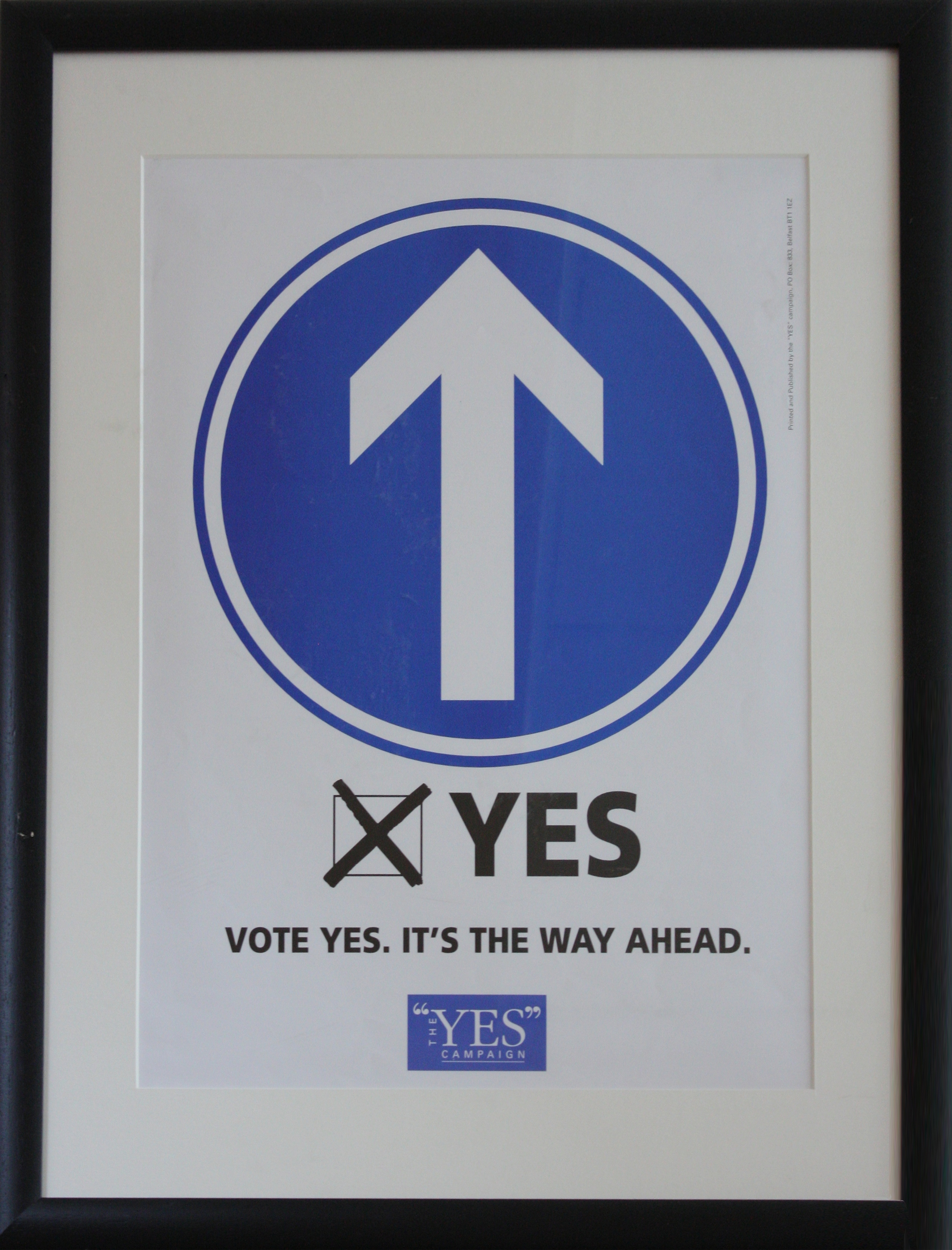
A 'Yes' campaign poster for the Good Friday Agreement during simultaneous referendums in Northern Ireland and in the Republic of Ireland

The conflict in Northern Ireland, as well as dividing both Governments, paradoxically also led to increasingly closer co-operation and improved relations between Ireland and the United Kingdom. A 1981 meeting between the two governments established the Anglo-Irish Intergovernmental Council. This was further developed in 1985 under the Anglo-Irish Agreement whereby the two governments created the Anglo-Irish Intergovernmental Conference, under the Anglo-Irish Intergovernmental Council, as a regular forum for the two Governments to reach agreement on, "(i) political matters; (ii) security and related matters; (iii) legal matters, including the administration of justice; (iv) the promotion of cross-border co-operation." The Conference was "mainly concerned with Northern Ireland; but some of the matters under consideration will involve cooperative action in both parts of the island of Ireland, and possibly also in Great Britain." The Agreement also recommended the establishment of the Anglo-Irish Interparliamentary Body, a body where parliamentarians from the Houses of the Oireachtas (Ireland) and Houses of Parliament (United Kingdom) would regularly meet to share views and ideas. This was created in 1990 as the British–Irish Inter-Parliamentary Body.

The Northern Ireland peace process culminated in the Good Friday Agreement of 1998 that further developed the institutions established under these Anglo-Irish Agreement. New institutions were established interlocking across "strands":

- Strand I: an Assembly and Executive for Northern Ireland based on the D'Hondt method;
- Strand II: a North/South Ministerial Council to develop co-operation and common policies within the island of Ireland;
- Strand III:
  1. a British–Irish Council "to promote the harmonious and mutually beneficial development of the totality of relationships among the peoples of these islands"
  2. a new British–Irish Intergovernmental Conference, established under the British–Irish Agreement, replaced the Anglo-Irish Intergovernmental Council and the Anglo-Irish Intergovernmental Conference.

The scope of the British–Irish Intergovernmental Conference is broader that the original Conference, and is intended to "bring together the British and Irish Governments to promote bilateral co-operation at all levels on all matters of mutual interest within the competence of both Governments." The Conference also provides a joint institution for the government of Northern Ireland on non-devolved matters (or all matters when the Northern Ireland Assembly is suspended). However, the United Kingdom retains ultimate sovereignty over Northern Ireland. Representatives from Northern Ireland participate in the Conference when matters relating to Northern Ireland are concerned.

The members of the British–Irish Council (sometimes called the Council of the Isles) are representatives of the Irish and British Governments, the devolved administrations in Northern Ireland, Scotland and Wales, together with representatives of the Isle of Man and the Channel Islands. It meets regularly to discuss matters of mutual interest divided into work areas (such as energy, environment or housing) allocated to individual members to work and report on.

The Anglo-Irish Interparliamentary Body developed independently over the same period, eventually becoming known as the British–Irish Parliamentary Assembly and including members from the devolved administrations of the UK and the Crown Dependencies.

The development of these institutions was supported by acts such the visit of efforts by Mary Robinson (as President of Ireland) to the Queen Elizabeth II (Queen of the United Kingdom), an apology by Tony Blair (as Prime Minister of the United Kingdom) to Irish people for the failures of the British Government during the Great Famine of 1845—1852 and the creation of the Island of Ireland Peace Park. A state visit of Queen Elizabeth II to Ireland in May 2011 – including the laying of a wreath at a memorial to IRA fighters in the Anglo-Irish war – symbolically sealed the change in relationships between the two states following the transfer of police and justice powers to Northern Ireland. The visit came a century after her grandfather, King George V, was the last monarch of the United Kingdom to pay a state visit to Ireland in July 1911, while it was still part of the United Kingdom.

== Political landscape ==
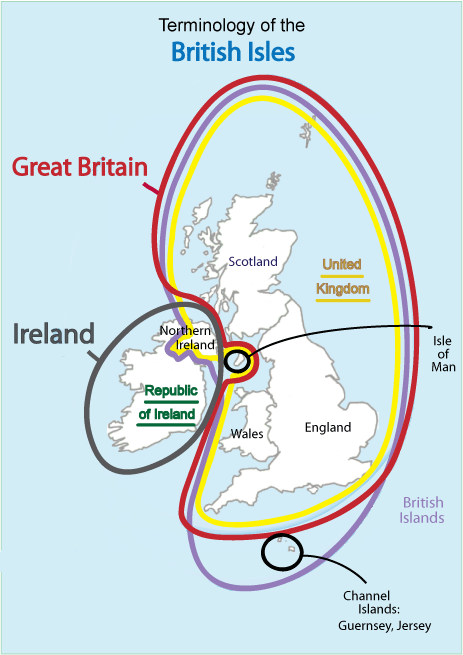
A political map of Ireland, the United Kingdom and the Crown Dependencies - The Irish state's official name is "Ireland" but the description "Republic of Ireland" is used for it in the map. The term British Isles to refer to the entire archipelago is an officially disputed term by Ireland as, by definition, not all the isles are "British".

Today, the islands of Great Britain and Ireland contain two sovereign states: Ireland (alternatively described as the Republic of Ireland) and the United Kingdom. The United Kingdom comprises four countries of the United Kingdom. All but Northern Ireland have been independent states at one point.

There are also three Crown dependencies, Guernsey, Jersey and the Isle of Man, in the archipelago which are not part of the United Kingdom, although the United Kingdom maintains responsibility for certain affairs such as international affairs and ensuring good governance, on behalf of the British crown, and can legislate directly for them. These participate in the shared institutions created between Ireland and the United Kingdom under the Good Friday Agreement. The United Kingdom and the Crown dependencies are called the British Islands.

The devolved administrations of the United Kingdom and the three Crown Dependencies also participate in the shared institutions established under the Good Friday Agreement.

The British monarch was head of state of all of these states and countries of the archipelago from the Union of the Crowns in 1603 until their role in Ireland became ambiguous with the enactment of the Constitution of Ireland in 1937. The remaining functions of the monarch in Ireland were transferred to the President of Ireland, with coming into effect of the Republic of Ireland Act in 1949.

== Co-operation ==
The British–Irish Intergovernmental Conference provides for co-operation between the Government of Ireland and the Government of the United Kingdom on all matters of mutual interest for which they have competence. Meetings take the form of summits between the Prime Minister of the United Kingdom and the Irish Taoiseach, on an "as required" basis. Otherwise, the two governments are represented by the appropriate ministers. In light of Ireland's particular interest in the governance of Northern Ireland, "regular and frequent" meetings co-chaired by the Irish Minister for Foreign Affairs and the UK Secretary of State for Northern Ireland, dealing with non-devolved matters to do with Northern Ireland and non-devolved all-Ireland issues, are required to take place under the establishing treaty.

At these meetings, the Irish government may put forward views and proposals, however sovereignty over Northern Ireland remains with the United Kingdom. In all of the work of the Conference, "All decisions will be by agreement between both Governments [who] will make determined efforts to resolve disagreements between them." The Conference is supported by a standing secretariat located at Belfast, Northern Ireland, dealing with non-devolved matters affecting Northern Ireland.

=== 'All-islands' institutions ===
An Euler diagram showing the major political entities of the British Isles

The British–Irish Council (BIC) is an international organisation laid out under the Belfast Agreement in 1998 and created by the established by the two Governments in 1999. Its members are:

- the two sovereign governments of Ireland and the United Kingdom;
- the three devolved administrations in Northern Ireland, Scotland and Wales
- the three governments of the Crown dependencies of Guernsey, the Isle of Man and Jersey.

The Council formally came into being on 2 December 1999. Its stated aim is to "promote the harmonious and mutually beneficial development of the totality of relationships among the peoples of these islands". The BIC has a standing secretariat, located in Edinburgh, Scotland, and meets in bi-annual summits and regular sectoral meetings. Summit meetings are attended by the heads of each administrations (e.g. the Prime Minister of the United Kingdom) whereas sectoral meetings are attended by the relevant ministers form each administration.

While the Council is made up of representatives from the executive of the various administrations in the region, it does not have executive power itself. Instead, its decisions, so far as they exist, are implemented separately by each administration on the basis of consensus. Given this – that the Council has no means to force its member administrations into implementing programmes of action – the Council has been dismissed as a "talking shop" and its current role appears to be one mainly of "information exchange and consultation".

In addition to the Council, the British–Irish Parliamentary Assembly (BIPA) is composed of members of the legislative bodies in the United Kingdom, including the devolved legislatures, Ireland, and the British Crown dependencies. It is the older of the two 'all-islands' institutions (BIC and BIPA) having been founded in 1990 as the British–Irish Inter-Parliamentary Body. Its purpose is to foster common understanding between elected representatives from these jurisdictions and, while having no legislative power, it conducts parliamentary activities such as receiving oral submissions, preparing reports and debating topical issues. The Assembly meets in plenary on a bi-annual basis, alternating in venue between Britain and Ireland, and maintains on-going work in committee.

These institutions have been described as part of a confederal approach to the government of the British–Irish archipelago.

=== All-Ireland institutions ===
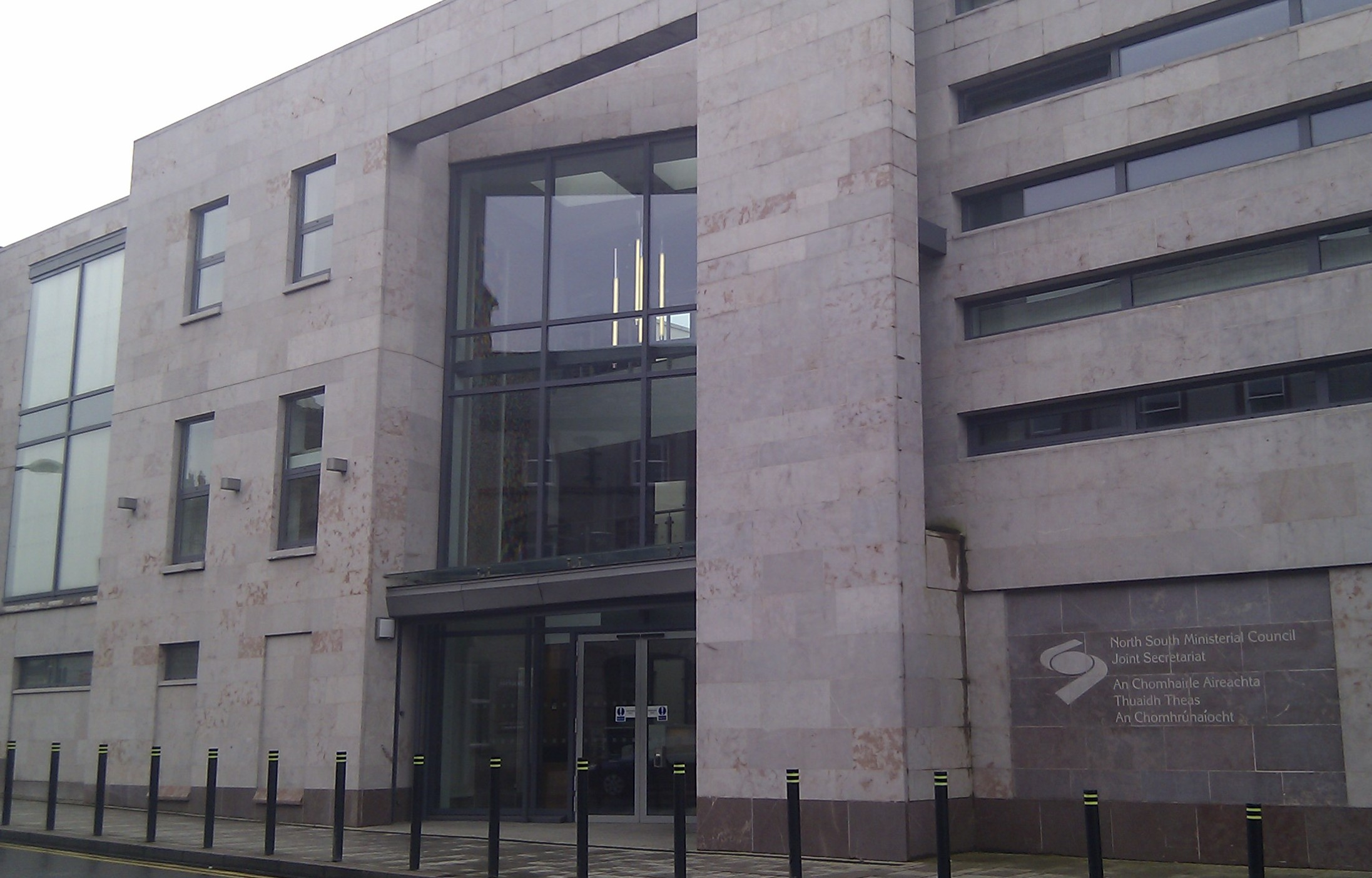
The offices of the North/South Ministerial Council on Upper English Street, Armagh

The North/South Ministerial Council (NSMC) coordinates activity and exercises certain governmental functions across the island of Ireland. The Council is responsible for developing and executing policy in at least twelve areas of co-operation, of which:

- at least six are executed separately in each jurisdiction
- at least six are executed by an all-Ireland "implementation body"

Further development of the role and function of the Council are possible "with the specific endorsement of the Northern Ireland Assembly and Oireachtas, subject to the extent of the competences and responsibility of the two Administrations."

The North/South Ministerial Council and the Northern Ireland Assembly are defined in the Good Friday Agreement as being "mutually inter-dependent, and that one cannot successfully function without the other." Participation in the Council is a requisite for the operation of the Northern Ireland Assembly and participation in the Northern Ireland Executive. When devolution in Northern Ireland is suspended, the powers of the Northern Ireland Executive revert to the British–Irish Intergovernmental Conference.

Meetings of the Council take the form of "regular and frequent" sectoral meetings between ministers from the Government of Ireland and the Northern Ireland Executive. Plenary meetings, attended by all ministers and led by the First Minister and deputy First Minister and the Taoiseach, take place twice a year. Institutional and cross-sectoral meetings, including matters in relation to the EU or to resolved disagreements, happen "in an appropriate format" on a ad hoc basis. The Council has a permanent office located in Armagh, Northern Ireland, staffed by a standing secretariat.

There is no joint parliamentary forum for the island of Ireland. However, under the Good Friday Agreement, the Oireachtas and Northern Ireland Assembly are asked to consider developing one. The Agreement also contains a suggestion for the creation of a consultative forum composed of members of civil society from Northern Ireland and the Republic of Ireland. Under the 2007, St. Andrew's Agreement, the Northern Ireland Executive agreed to support the establishment of a North/South Consultative Forum and to encourage parties in the Northern Ireland Assembly to support the creation of a North/South parliamentary forum.

=== Inter-regional relationships ===
Independent of the direct involvement of Government of the United Kingdom, the devolved administrations of Scotland, Northern Ireland and Wales, as well as the Crown dependencies, have relationships and with Ireland.

For example, the Irish and Welsh governments collaborate on various economic development projects through the Ireland Wales Programme, under the Interreg initiative of the European Union. The governments of Ireland and Scotland, together with the Northern Ireland Executive, also collaborated on the ISLES project under the aegis of the Special EU Programmes Body, set up under the Good Friday Agreement. The project was to facilitate the development of offshore renewable energy sources, such as wind, wave and tidal energy, and trade in renewable energy between Scotland, the Republic of Ireland and Northern Ireland.

==== Scotland ====
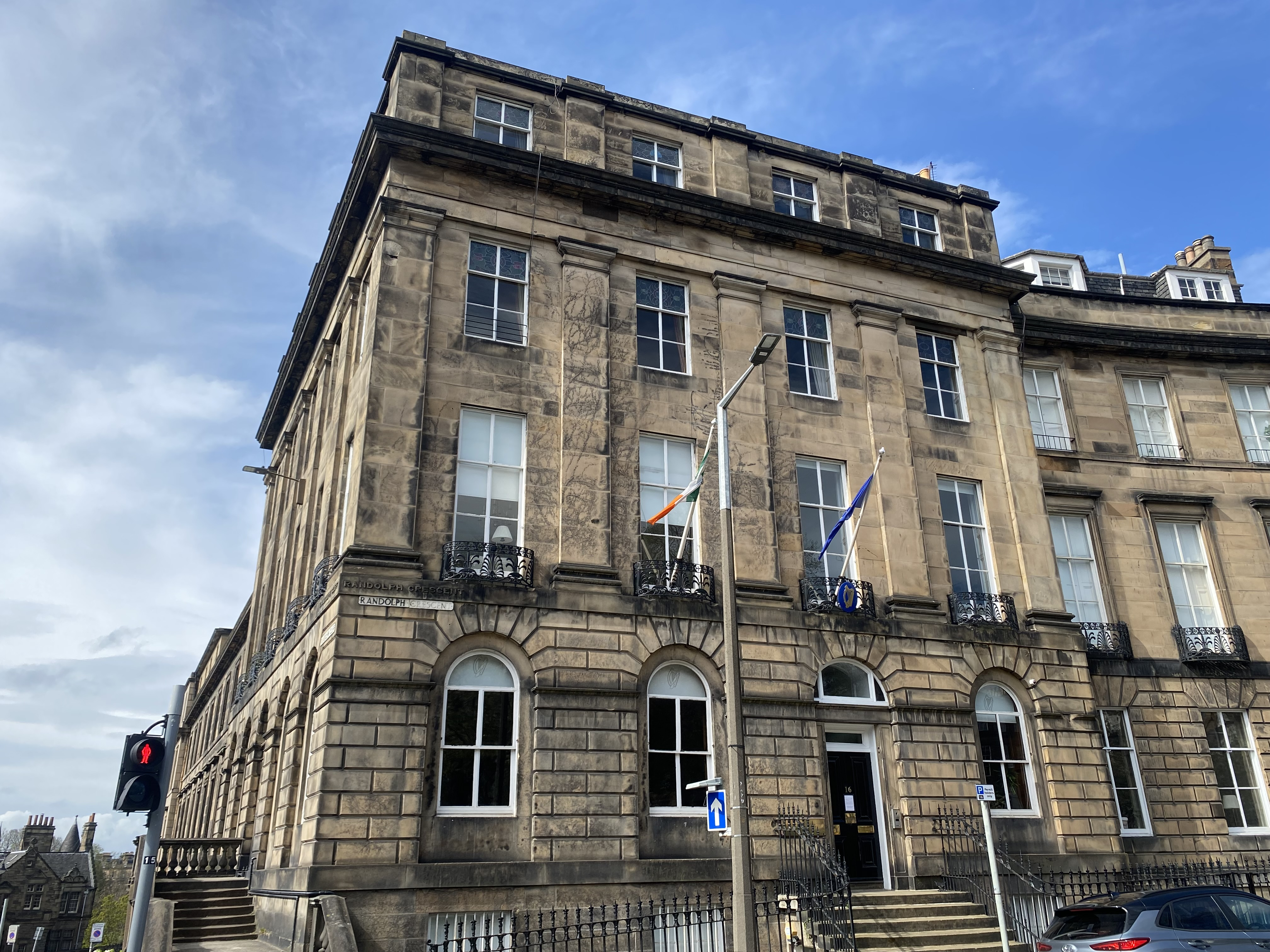
Consulate General of Ireland in Edinburgh

Scottish First Minister John Swinney meets with Irish President Catherine Connolly, September 2026

Relations between Ireland and Scotland are supported by geographical proximity across the Irish Sea, longstanding cultural and historical connections, trade and cooperation in areas of shared policy interest. Both governments participate in the British–Irish Council, which provides a formal mechanism for consultation on matters affecting their respective communities. Economic relations include trade in goods and services, tourism, investment and connections between businesses and educational institutions. The Irish government identifies the wider relationship between Ireland and the United Kingdom as an important economic partnership, while also maintaining engagement with Scotland through bilateral contacts and the British–Irish Council.

Relations between Ireland and Scotland have been maintained through regular meetings between the Taoiseach, the President of Ireland, Irish government ministers and Scotland's First Minister and cabinet secretaries. In November 2025, John Swinney, the First Minister of Scotland, visited Dublin, where he met representatives of the Irish government and launched the Ireland–Scotland Bilateral Cooperation Framework 2030 with Neale Richmond, Ireland's Minister of State for International Development and Diaspora. The visit reaffirmed both governments' intention to strengthen bilateral relations and establish priorities for cooperation through the end of the decade. In September 2026, Catherine Connolly, President of Ireland, undertook a four-day official visit to Scotland. The visit began with a meeting with First Minister John Swinney and Stephen Gethins, the Scottish Minister for Europe, External Relations and Energy, at Bute House in Edinburgh.

==== Northern Ireland ====
Relations between the Republic of Ireland and Northern Ireland are distinct from those with Scotland and Wales because they involve cross-border cooperation on the same island and are directly connected to the constitutional arrangements established by the Good Friday Agreement. The 1998 agreement established a framework for relations between the Irish and British governments, institutions within Northern Ireland and cooperation between Northern Ireland and Ireland. It recognised the principle of consent concerning Northern Ireland's constitutional status and provided for institutional cooperation on matters of mutual interest.

==== Wales ====
Relations between Ireland and Wales are characterised by geographical proximity, historical connections, cultural exchange and participation in common intergovernmental institutions. Both administrations are members of the British–Irish Council, through which they can discuss shared policy challenges and cooperate in areas of mutual interest.

=== Common Travel Area ===
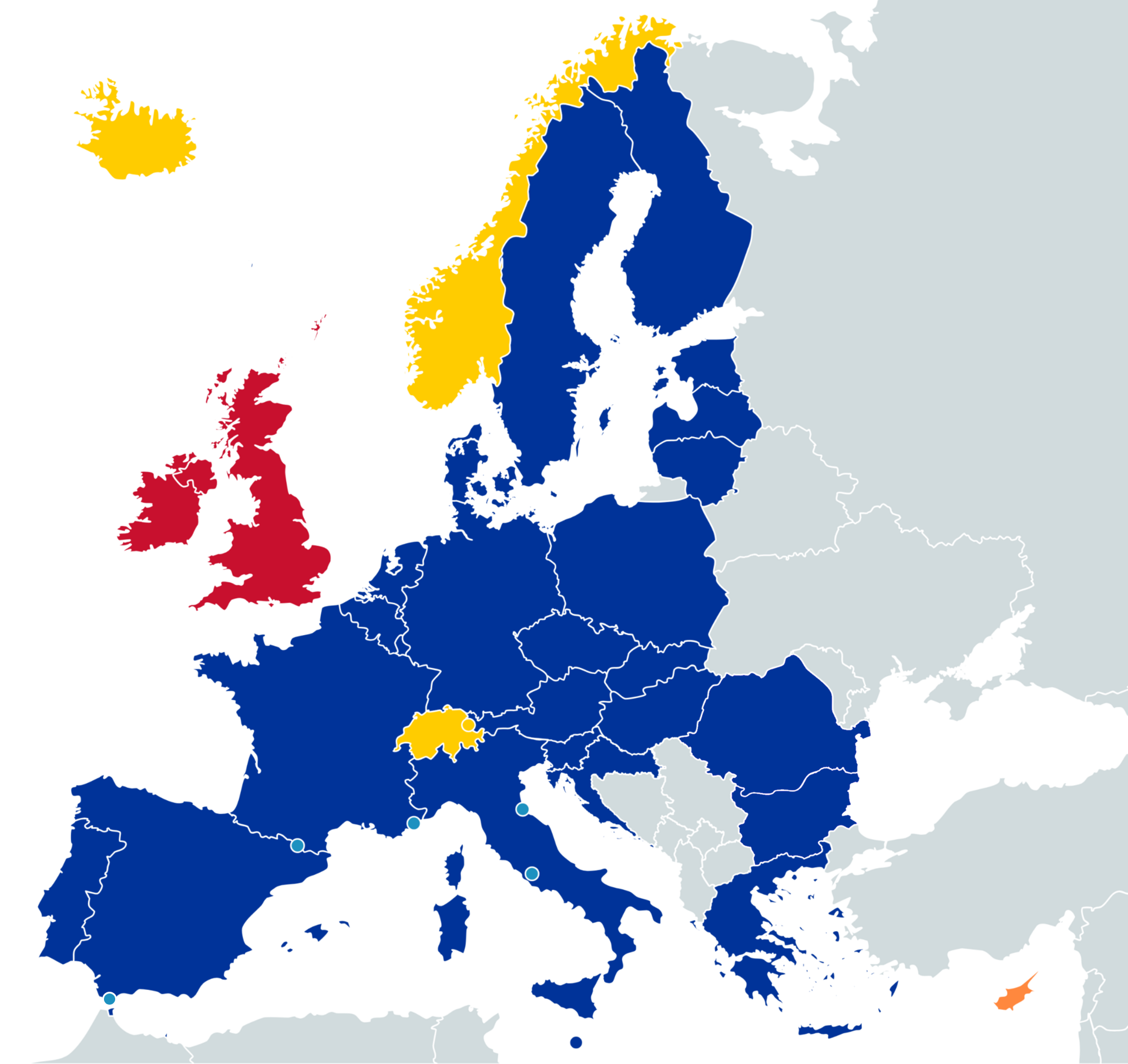
The Common Travel Area Schengen Area (EU) Schengen Area (non-EU) States due to join the Schengen Area

Ireland is the only member state in the European Union not obliged to join the Schengen free-travel area (the United Kingdom also had an opt out from joining prior to its withdrawal from the bloc in 2020). Instead, a Common Travel Area exists between the two states and the Crown Dependencies (which were never part of the EU, thus never obliged to join Schengen).

The Common Travel Areas is not founded on any formal agreement between Ireland and the United Kingdom and is not provided for in legislation. Instead, it is an informal arrangement between the states. When the Schengen Area was incorporated into the European Union through the 1992 Amsterdam Treaty, the first formal recognition of the Common Travel areas was made though an annexed protocol exempting their obligations to join.

The UK's previous reluctance to join the Schengen Area when it was a member state, was mainly centred around concerns over loss of independent border controls, is usually cited as the reason for not joining. Britain argued that, for an island, frontier controls are a better and less intrusive way to prevent illegal immigration than other measures, such as identity cards, residence permits, and registration with the police. Consequent difficulties for Ireland, given its location and shared border with the UK (at which border points would have to be set up), would then make it very difficult for Ireland to join without the UK.

Except for a period during and in the years after World War II, neither Ireland nor the UK have placed restrictions on travel between each other for citizens resident in each others states since Irish independence. Even during wartime, when Ireland remained neutral and the UK was a belligerent during World War II, the only significant restrictions on travel between the states were an Irish prohibition on the wearing of military uniforms by British citizens when in Irish territory and the instatement of passport controls between Great Britain and the island of Ireland. When Ireland declared itself a republic in 1949, thus making it impossible at the time to remain in the British Commonwealth, the British government legislated that even though the Republic of Ireland was no longer a British dominion, British law would not treat Ireland as a foreign state. Irish citizens have automatic indefinite leave to remain in the United Kingdom, are not considered foreigners, and can vote and stand elections for the House of Commons and local councils. In principle, nothing would prevent an Irish citizen from being a Westminster MP or even a government minister.

Prior to World War II, both states mutually recognised each other's entry visas for foreigners. However, in 1952 changes to UK law rescinded this arrangement. In 2011, the first public agreement between the British and Irish governments concerning the maintenance of the Common Travel Area (CTA) was published.

The agreement, which is non-binding, envisions increased co-ordination between Irish and British immigration arrangements and that, from July 2011 Ireland would recognise UK short-term visas on an 18-month pilot basis for nationals of 16 countries. The agreement also mooted the possibility of "Common Travel Area visit visa" including the possibility of a pilot project.

The CTA applies only to Irish and British citizens. As such, residents of either state (or any of the Crown Dependencies) who do not hold one of those nationalities do not have an automatic right to enter Ireland from the UK, or vice versa, including over the land border. As a result of this, there was some controversy when the British government announced an electronic authorisation system for tourists to the UK, which would have meant non-citizen residents of the Republic of Ireland, including EU nationals, would need to apply for an authorisation to cross the land border. This would include many who live near the border and cross regularly for leisure trips. In March 2024, the British government updated guidance to exempt residents of the Republic of Ireland from the scheme.

There are no special arrangements for travel between the Common Travel Area and the Schengen Area and a Schengen visa entitle entry. However, citizens of the European Union, Norway, Iceland, Liechtenstein and Switzerland may enter as a right using only their passports.

=== Citizenship and citizens rights ===
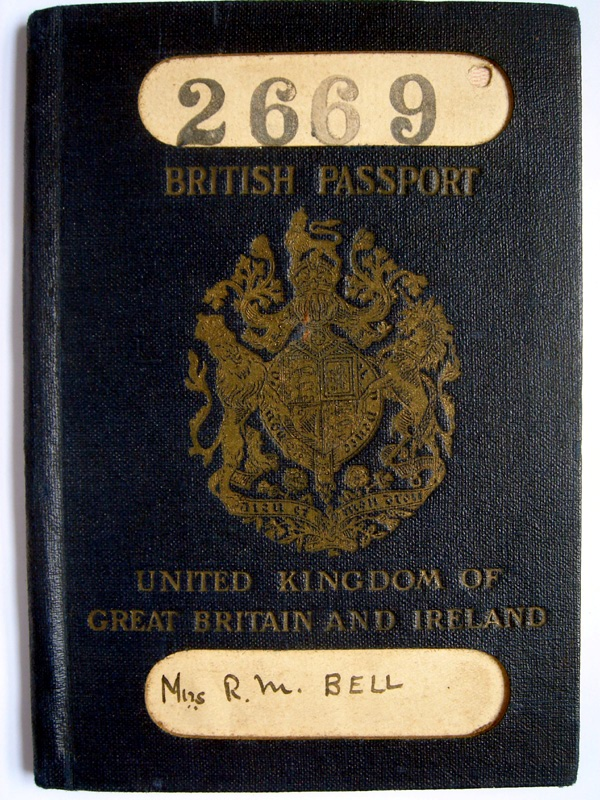
A 1924 passport, issued after the secession of the Irish Free State, bearing the name United Kingdom of Great Britain and Ireland. The Irish Free State also issued passports from 1924 onwards.

As a dominion of the British Empire, citizens of the Irish Free State were regarded as British subjects in common with all other members of the Empire. Historically, as late as 1942, British jurisprudence was that Irish citizenship "did no more than confer ... a national character as an Irish citizen within the wider British nationality". Indeed, for some years, the British authorities refused to accept Irish passports.

Starting from the basis of common citizenship, the two states to this day provide reciprocal recognition to each others' citizens. British and Irish citizens resident in the opposite jurisdiction have access to public healthcare and social welfare on equal terms, and can vote in each national and local elections (save that British citizens cannot vote for the President of Ireland and Irish referendums). Due to the peace agreement which ended the Northern Ireland conflict, Northern Irish people have the right to choose to be citizens of the United Kingdom, Ireland, or both.

=== Energy ===
A single wholesale electricity market exists on the island of Ireland since 2007. Work towards common arrangements for the transmission and distributions of natural gas, including a common retail market arrangements by 2014, on the island are also underway.

In 2004, a natural gas interconnection agreement was signed between the United Kingdom and Ireland, linking Ireland with Scotland via the Isle of Man.

In 2011, the members of the British–Irish Council agreed an "All Islands Approach (AIA)" to electricity grid infrastructure and have launched a programme of joint work examining renewable energy trading as well as interconnection and market integration.

=== Shared bodies ===
The United Kingdom and Ireland share a number of civic bodies such as the Royal National Lifeboat Institution, that provides sea-rescue across the islands of Great Britain and Ireland.

The three lighthouse authorities in the archipelago (the Northern Lighthouse Board, Trinity House Lighthouse Service and the Commissioners of Irish Lights) are funded by a single General Lighthouse Fund managed by the UK Department for Transport and paid for by light dues levied on ships calling at British and Irish ports. While this broad arrangement will continue, the total cost of the Commissioners of Irish Lights' work in Ireland (not Northern Ireland) will be met from income raised domestically as from 2015—16.

=== Military cooperation ===
Ireland and the UK normalised military cooperation with the signing of a Memorandum of Understanding between the Irish Department of Defence and the British Ministry of Defence in January 2015:

The Memorandum of Understanding (MOU) provides a framework for developing and furthering bilateral co-operation and relations between the Department of Defence and the UK Ministry of Defence. The MOU takes into account matters such as military forces training; exercises and military education; exchange of views on EU Common Security and Defence Policy; potential for joint contributions to UN Crisis Management Operations; joint procurement initiatives; pooling and sharing resources; general sharing of reform in defence services; potential for staff exchanges; sharing of information, and joint contribution to Security Sector Reform and capacity building in crisis locations. It envisages cooperation and exchanges involving both civil and military personnel. The signing of the MoU places already existing co-operation arrangements in the Defence area between Ireland and the UK on a more formal and transparent footing, while fully respecting the differing policy positions and security arrangements of both States.

To date, I have not been requested to appear before the Committee on Justice, Defence and Equality to discuss the Agreement. However, I would welcome the opportunity to brief the Committee should the opportunity arise.

Dáil approval was not required for the Memorandum of Understanding. However, in the interests of transparency and good administrative practices, the Document has been laid before Dáil Éireann by lodging it to the Dáil Library on 21 January 2015.

— Simon Coveney, "Dáil Written Answers Nos. 354-370"

Ireland and the UK reportedly have, since 1952, a secret memorandum of understanding to allow the Royal Air Force to intercept aircraft in Irish airspace, including lethal force if necessary. Any action requires prior Irish authorisation. Michael Smith said in 2003 as Minister of Defence that if a foreign attack on Ireland occurred "it is clear that outside assistance would be required". He refused to say which country would assist, but likely referred to the United Kingdom. James Heappey, a British Minister of State for the Armed Forces, alluded to the agreement when he stated in November 2022 that RAF aircraft "deployed into Irish airspace on occasion", referring to interceptions of Russian Air Force bombers.

=== Summits ===
On 7 September 2024, British Prime Minister Starmer and Taoiseach Simon Harris agreed to reinstate regular bilateral Ireland-UK summits during a trip by Starmer to Dublin.

Ireland–United Kingdom Summits
#	Date	Country	City	Location	Host Leader	Ref	Image
1	6 March 2025	United Kingdom	Liverpool	Inglewood Manor	Prime Minister Keir Starmer		
2	13 March 2026	Ireland	Cork	Fota House	Taoiseach Micheál Martin		

== Political movements ==
An important political movement in several countries in the Isles is British unionism, an ideology favouring the continued union of the United Kingdom. It is most prevalent in Scotland, Wales, England, and Northern Ireland. British unionism has close ties to British nationalism. Another movement is Loyalism, which manifests itself as loyalism to the British Crown.

The converse of unionism, nationalism, is also an important factor for politics in the Isles. Nationalism can take the form of Welsh nationalism, Cornish nationalism, English nationalism, Scottish nationalism, Northern Ireland nationalism, Irish nationalism in Northern Ireland or independence movements in the Isle of Man or Channel Islands.

Several Irish parties are organised on both sides of the Irish border. In recent years, Sinn Féin and the Green Party have won seats in Dáil and Assembly elections in the Republic of Ireland and Northern Ireland, respectively. Fianna Fáil won a seat in the 1933 general election to the former Parliament of Northern Ireland but refused to take the seat.

There are movements aimed at unifying the Irish island into 1 country under the Republic of Ireland.

Pan-Celticism is also a movement which is present in several countries which have a Celtic heritage.

== Immigration and emigration ==
Irish migration to Great Britain is an important factor in the politics and labour markets of the Isles. Irish people have been the largest ethnic minority group in Britain for centuries, regularly migrating across the Irish Sea. From the earliest recorded history to the present, there has been a continuous movement of people between the islands of Ireland and Great Britain due to their proximity. This tide has ebbed and flowed in response to politics, economics and social conditions of both places. At the 2011 census, there were 869,000 Irish-born residents in the United Kingdom.

As of 2013, the Britons represent the largest immigrant minority of European origin in the Republic of Ireland.

== Culture ==
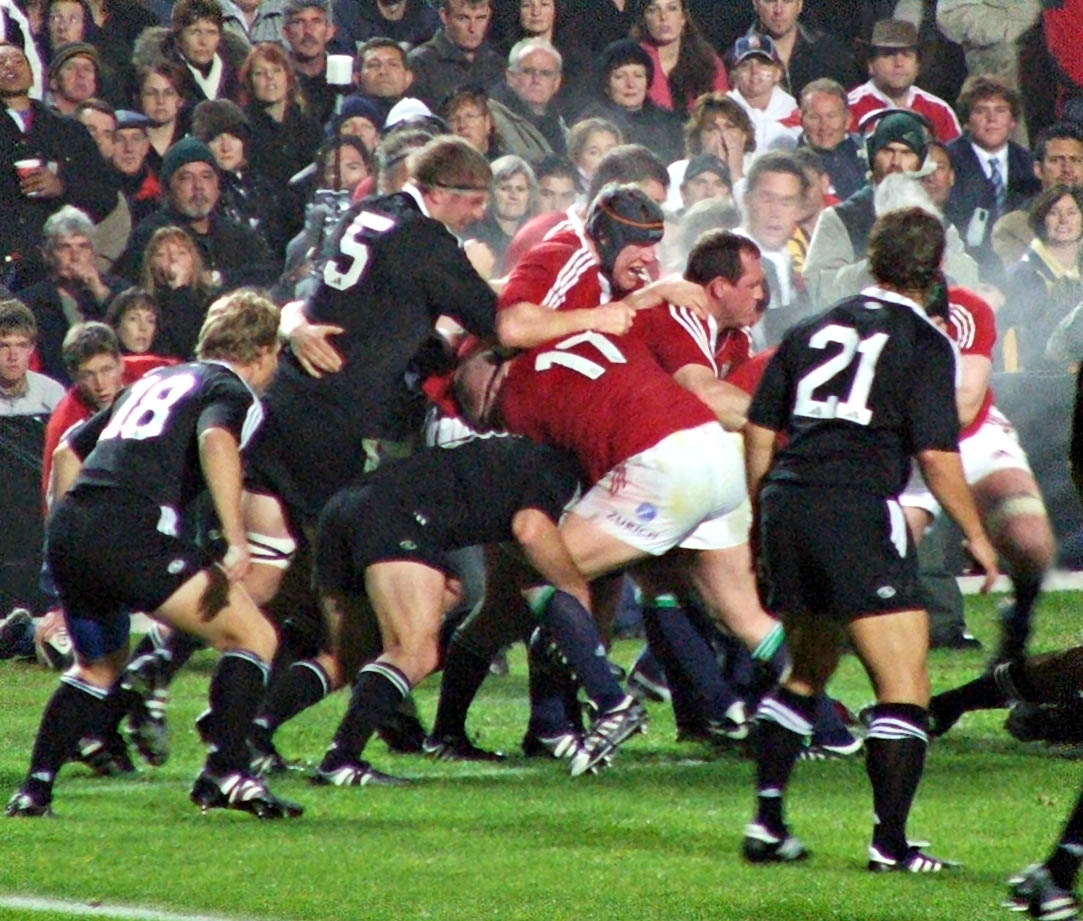
The British and Irish Lions rugby union team (red) against the New Zealand Maoris (black) in 2005

Many of the countries and regions of the isles, especially Ireland, Wales, Cornwall, Isle of Man, and Scotland share a common Celtic heritage, and all of these countries have branches of the Celtic league.

=== Media ===
The United Kingdom and Ireland have separate media, although British television, newspapers and magazines are widely available in Ireland, giving people in Ireland a high level of familiarity with cultural matters in the United Kingdom. Republic of Ireland newspapers and magazines are commonly available in Northern Ireland, and the two main Irish broadsheets, The Irish Times and the Irish Independent are frequently available to the diaspora in Great Britain. Certain reality TV shows have embraced the whole of the islands, for example The X Factor, seasons 3, 4 and 7 of which featured auditions in Dublin, were open to voters in the Republic, while the show previously known as Britain's Next Top Model became Britain and Ireland's Next Top Model in 2011.

Ireland and the United Kingdom have agreed to a deal on the digital broadcast of BBC Northern Ireland and Channel 4 into the Republic of Ireland and of RTÉ and TG4 into Northern Ireland. Tara Television, which broadcast Irish programming into Great Britain, was wound up in 2002. A replacement, under the working title of RTÉ International, was postponed due to financial conditions. Instead, RTÉ Player provides a subset of programming for audiences outside Ireland.

Some cultural events are organised for the island group as a whole. For example, the Costa Book Awards are awarded to authors resident in the UK or Ireland. The Booker Prize is awarded to authors from the Commonwealth of Nations and Ireland. The Mercury Music Prize is handed out every year to the best album from an Irish or British musician or group.

=== Sport ===
The British and Irish Lions is a team made up of players from England, Ireland, Scotland and Wales that undertakes tours of the Southern Hemisphere rugby playing nations every four years. The Ryder Cup in golf was originally played between a United States team and a team representing Great Britain and Ireland. From 1979 onwards this was expanded to include the whole of Europe.

In 2012, the Olympic torch visited Dublin on a tour of the UK ahead of the 2012 Olympic Games in London. Dublin was the only place outside of the UK (apart from the traditional lighting ceremony in Greece) that the torch visited. UK Secretary of State for Culture, Olympics, Media and Sport, Jeremy Hunt, said: "The Republic of Ireland is the only country outside the UK to be visited by the torch and rightly so, given the unique and deep ties between Ireland and the UK."

== Economic relations ==
Due to the linguistic, cultural and legal (both as common law countries) similarities between the UK and Ireland, many businesses in both countries have operations in each other country. Both countries have each other as their biggest business partner, and both in the same trade organisations include the European Union and World Trade Organization.

Examples of notable British companies that have an Irish operations come as diverse as the supermarket chain Tesco (Tesco Ireland), the department store Marks & Spencer, telecoms company BT (BT Ireland) and electric company SSE plc (Airtricity). Notable Irish companies that work in the UK includes the airline Ryanair, fashion retailer Primark (founded in Dublin but now owned by Associated British Foods), food processor Kerry Group, dairy company Ornua, Irish Stout Brewery Guinness (owned by Diageo) and electric management company ESB.

Due to the closeness, some businesses often treat both countries of trade, finance and marketing as a single unit as quoting for "UK and Ireland" rather than two separate countries.

British Prime Minister Keir Starmer visited Dublin, signalling improved relations between Britain and Ireland. Both he and Irish Prime Minister Simon Harris emphasised moving from post-Brexit "friction back to friendship," aiming to strengthen diplomatic and trade ties.

=== Trade agreements ===
After both nations' bids to join the European Economic Community were rejected, Ireland and the UK signed the Ireland–UK Free Trade Area agreement on 19 December 1965. The bilateral free trade area was legally in force from 1 July 1966 until 1 January 1973. Both countries joined the European Economic Community on 1 January 1973. The European Economic Community was incorporated into the European Union on the 1 November 1993.

Following the result of the Brexit referendum, the UK invoked Article 50 in March 2017. The UK officially withdrew from the EU on the 1 January 2021. Trade between the United Kingdom and Ireland is governed by the EU–UK Trade and Cooperation Agreement since 1 January 2021.

== Resident diplomatic missions ==
- Ireland has an embassy in London and consulates-general in Cardiff, Edinburgh and Manchester.
- The United Kingdom has an embassy in Dublin.
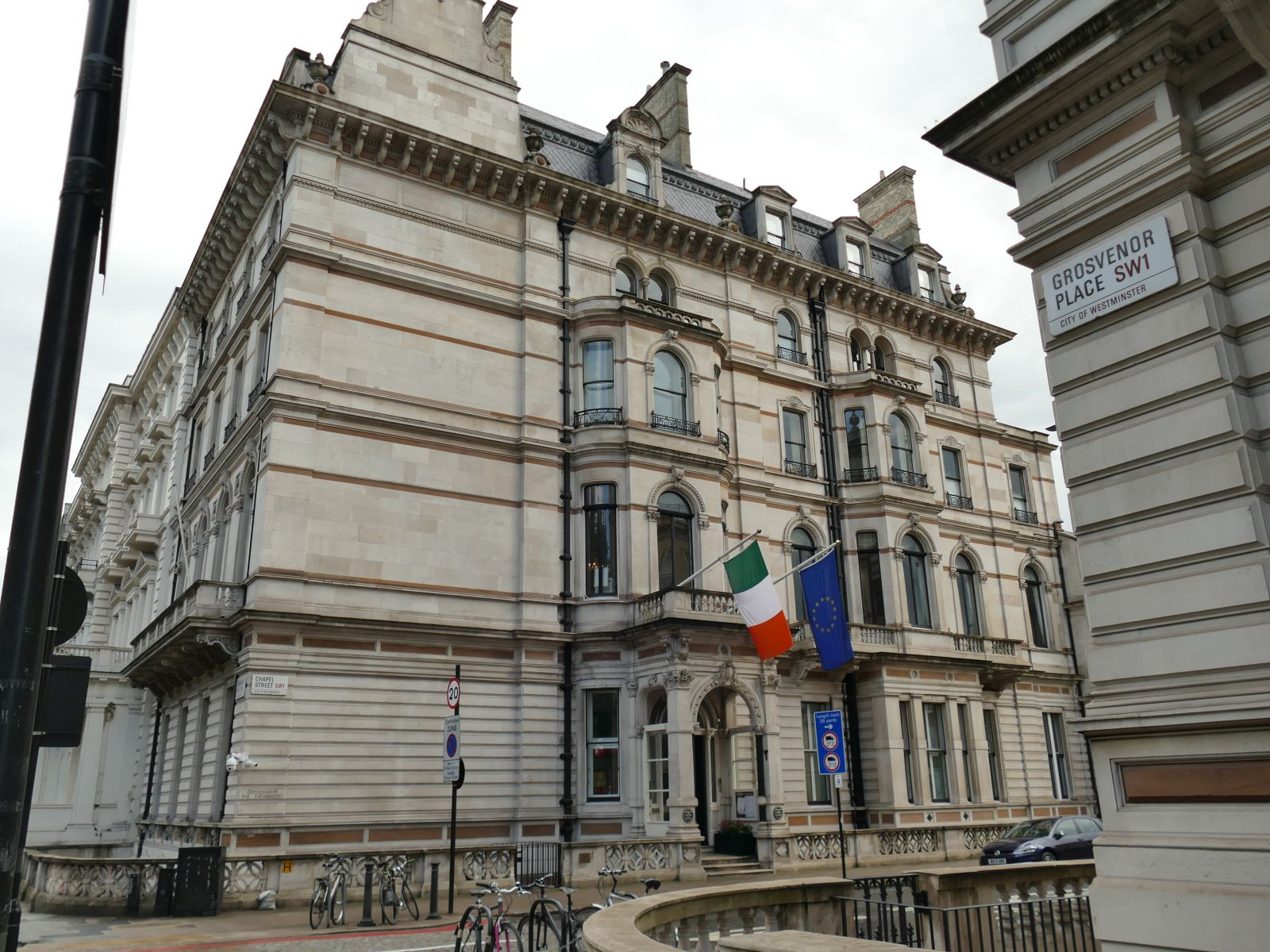
Embassy of Ireland in London

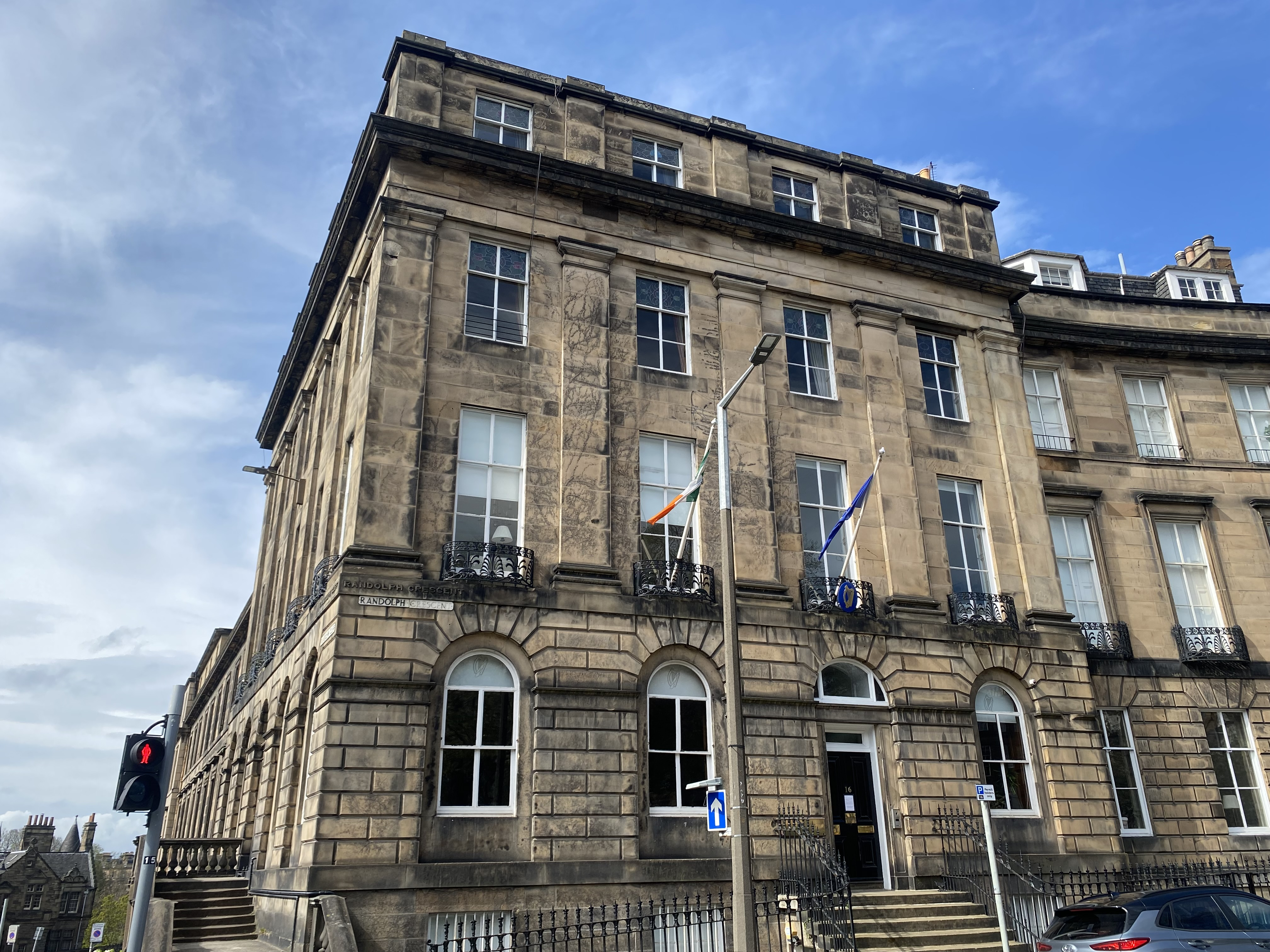
Consulate General of Ireland in Edinburgh

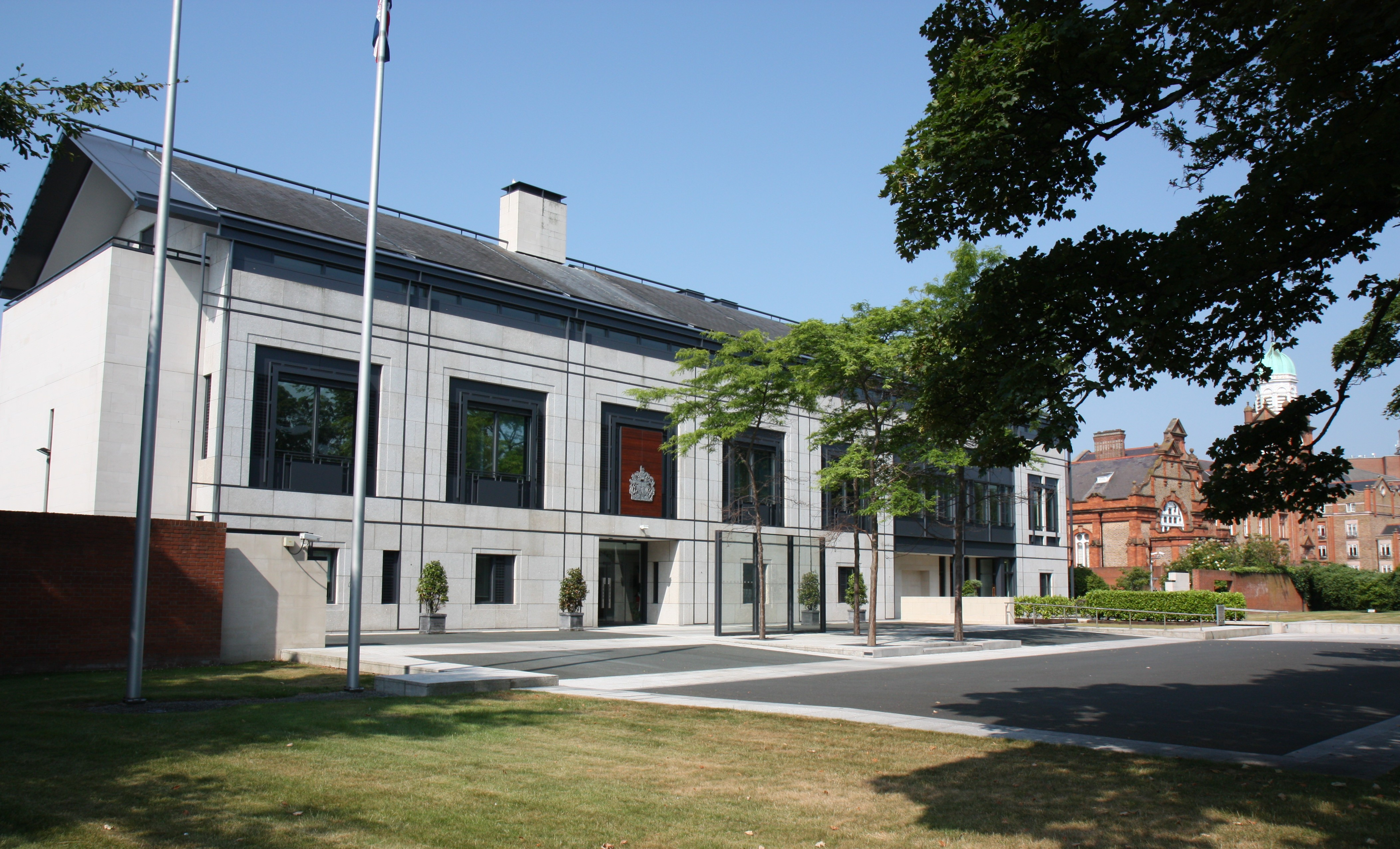
Embassy of the United Kingdom in Dublin

== See also ==
- Anglo-Irish
- Foreign relations of Ireland
- Foreign relations of the United Kingdom
- Ireland–United Kingdom border
- Irish community in Britain
- Ireland–NATO relations
- List of ambassadors of the United Kingdom to Ireland
- List of armed conflicts involving Ireland against the United Kingdom
- United Kingdom–European Union relations
