= List of armed conflicts involving Ireland against the United Kingdom =

Wars involving Ireland against the United Kingdom

This is a chronological list of armed conflicts involving Ireland and the United Kingdom. Both sides have fought many armed conflicts against each other.

Irish victory
British victory
Another result

== Irish rebels versus England/United Kingdom ==
Date	Conflict	Irish side	British side	Result
1169-1177	Anglo-Norman invasion of Ireland	Gaelic Ireland	Angevin Empire	Anglo-Norman victory: Most of Ireland absorbed into the Lordship of Ireland
1185	John's first expedition to Ireland	Lordship of Meath; Gaelic Ireland	Kingdom of England: Lordship of Ireland	Irish Victory: John returns to England; Hugh de Lacy falls out of royal favour
1210	John's second expedition to Ireland	Lordship of Meath; Gaelic Ireland	Kingdom of England: Lordship of Ireland	English victory
1315-1318	Bruce campaign in Ireland	Gaelic Ireland Kingdom of Scotland	Kingdom of England: Lordship of Ireland	English victory
1534-1537	Kildare Rebellion	FitzGerald of Kildare: Allied Gaelic and Norman clans	Kingdom of England: Lordship of Ireland	English victory
1569-1573	First Desmond Rebellion	Fitzmaurice of Desmond FitzGerald of Desmond Allied clans	Kingdom of England: (Kingdom of Ireland) Irish loyalists	English victory: Second Desmond Rebellion
1579-1583	Second Desmond Rebellion	FitzGeralds of Desmond O'Byrnes Spain and Papal troops	Kingdom of England and Irish allies	English victory: Famine throughout Munster; Plantations of Munster
1593-1603	Nine Years' War (Ireland)	Irish alliance Spain	Kingdom of England and loyalists	English victory: Treaty of Mellifont (1603); Flight of the Earls (1607)
1641-1653	Eleven Years' War	Irish Catholic Confederates Royalists Scottish Covenanters	Kingdom of Ireland Laggan Army Kingdom of England Scottish Covenanters English Parliamentarians	English Parliamentarian victory: English conquest of Ireland
1689-1691	Williamite War in Ireland	Jacobites	Kingdom of England Kingdom of Scotland	Anglo-Scottish victory: Treaty of Limerick (1691)
1798	Irish Rebellion of 1798	United Irishmen Defenders France	Great Britain: Ireland	British victory (Suppression by Crown forces): Abolition of the Irish Parliament and creation of the United Kingdom of Great Britain and Ireland in 1801
1798-1803	Michael Dwyer's guerrilla campaign	United Irishmen	Great Britain: Ireland; (1798-1800) United Kingdom (1801-1803)	British victory: Michael Dwyer capitulates
1803	Irish Rebellion of 1803	United Irishmen	United Kingdom	British victory (Rebellion suppressed)
1848	Young Ireland rebellion	Young Irelanders	(United Kingdom of Great Britain and Ireland) Irish Constabulary	British victory: Rebels besiege a police unit, but retreat after police reinforcements arrive
1867	Fenian Rising	Irish Republican Brotherhood: Fenian Brotherhood	United Kingdom of Great Britain and Ireland	British victory: Political reorganisation
1916	Easter Rising	(Irish Republic) Irish rebel forces	(United Kingdom of Great Britain and Ireland) British forces	British victory: Unconditional surrender of Rebel forces; Execution of most leaders
1919-1921	Irish War of Independence	Irish Republic	United Kingdom	Inconclusive: Military stalemate; Anglo-Irish Treaty (1921); Ensuring Irish Civil War

== See also ==
- Ireland–United Kingdom relations
