= Burning of the British Embassy in Dublin =

Burning of the British Embassy
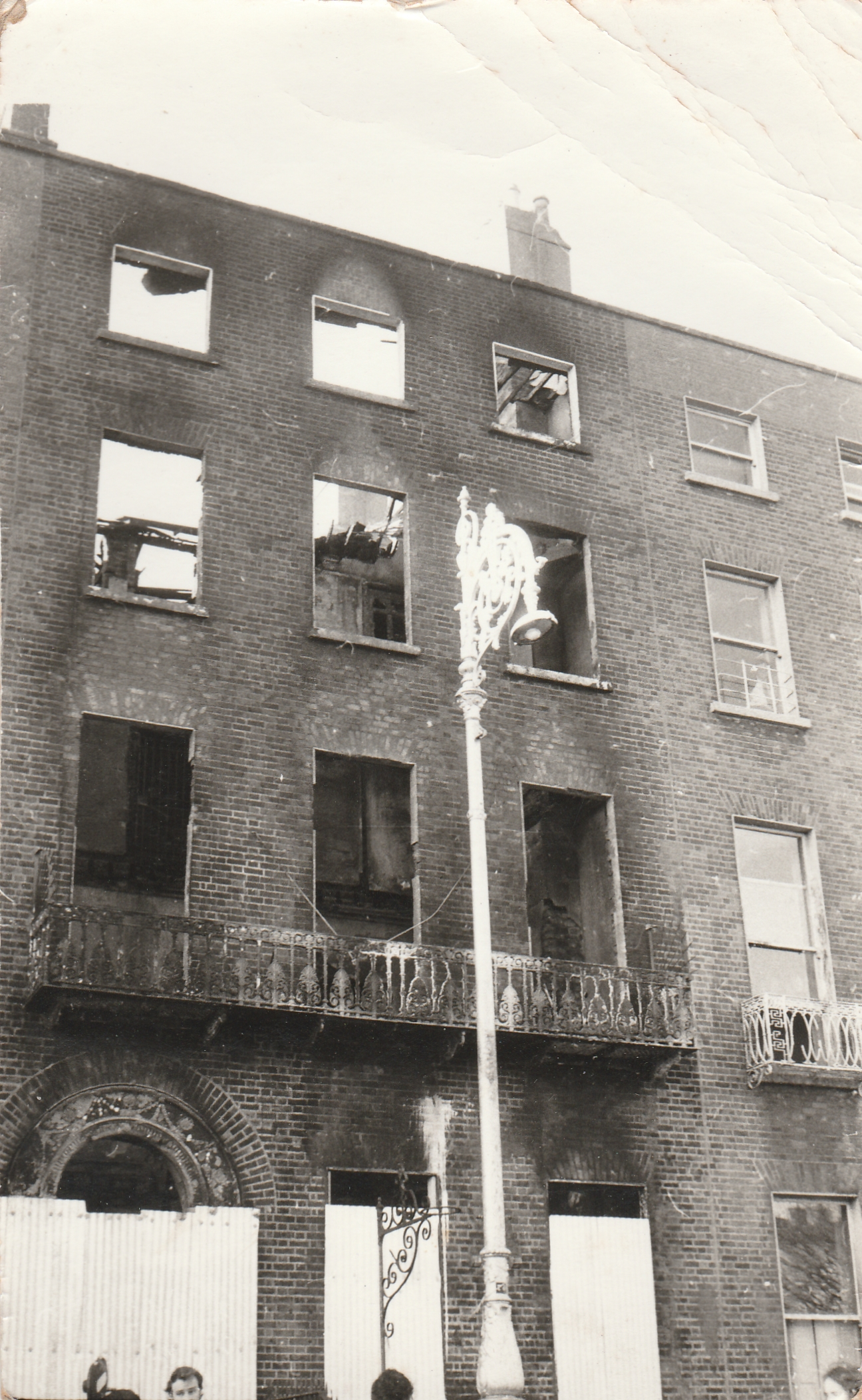
- The building pictured on the morning after the fire
- Date: 2 February 1972
- Time: 16:00–19:00 (GMT)
- Venue: 39 Merrion Square
- Location: Dublin, Ireland; 53.33910°N 6.24655°W
- Motive: Bloody Sunday (1972)
- Injuries: 30

The British Embassy in Dublin at 39 Merrion Square was destroyed by arson on 2 February 1972. This occurred during demonstrations outside the chancery by a large crowd (estimates vary between 20,000 and 100,000 people), due to their outrage and animosity against the British government following the Bloody Sunday massacre in Derry on 30 January 1972, when the British Army's Parachute Regiment shot dead 14 unarmed Catholic civilians during a civil rights demonstration.

== Timeline ==
=== Sunday 30 January ===
A protest against internment without trial in Northern Ireland, organised by the Northern Ireland Civil Rights Association on 30 January 1972, ended in a massacre by members of the first battalion of the Parachute Regiment of the British Army.

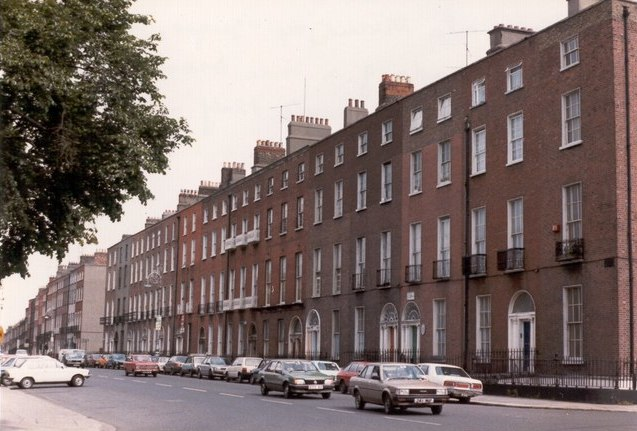
Merrion Square, Dublin in 1985

A telephone conversation was held in the evening between Prime Minister Edward Heath and Taoiseach Jack Lynch. In the tense call, Heath never expressed any shock or horror at what had happened and told Lynch that the IRA were "bound to intervene" at the march and that the organizers of the demonstration carried a "heavy responsibility" for what happened.

Lynch addressed the Irish public on national television, saying "The government is satisfied that British soldiers recklessly fired on unarmed civilians in Derry yesterday and that any denial of this continues and increases the provocation offered by present British policies both with the minority in Northern Ireland and to us here".

=== Monday 31 January ===
On Monday 31 January, angry protests began throughout Ireland, with some walk-outs from places of employment and boycotts of British services at Dublin airport and port.

The UK Home Secretary, Reginald Maudling, gave a statement in the House of Commons affirming:

"A large number of trouble-makers refused to accept the instructions of the march stewards and attacked the Army with stones, bottles, steel bars and canisters of CS gas. The Army met this assault with two water cannons, CS, and rubber bullets only. The G.O.C. has further reported that when the Army advanced to make arrests among the trouble-makers they came under fire from a block of flats and other quarters. At this stage the members of the orderly, although illegal, march were no longer in the near vicinity. The Army returned the fire directed at them with aimed shots and inflicted a number of casualties on those who were attacking them with firearms and with bombs."

Heath made no substantial comments, in or outside of Parliament.

=== Tuesday 1 February ===
In the morning, Heath spoke in the House of Commons about the terms of the Widgery inquiry. He stated "I do not wish to comment now on the events of last Sunday" but later added "The security forces are under very strict orders. It is, of course, the responsibility of Her Majesty's Government, and of the Secretary of State for Defence in particular, to see that those orders are appropriate and are carried out."

=== Wednesday 2 February ===
In the afternoon, a large protest march was held in the Dublin city centre, followed by a protest march towards the nearby chancery of the British Embassy. Then RTÉ security correspondent Tom McCaughren estimated there were eight to ten thousand people, in the confined space immediately outside the building (estimates of the size of the earlier marches vary between 20,000 and 100,000). The large crowds outside, and in the vicinity, made it hard for the security forces, and later the fire brigade, to intervene. Protesters carried black flags, tricolours and placards condemning the British government. Black coffins painted with "Bloody Sunday" and "13" were carried by the crowd and placed at the chancery door.

Gardaí tried at first to keep the protestors away from the chancery but were very largely outnumbered. The press reported 30 injuries as the police charged at the crowds.

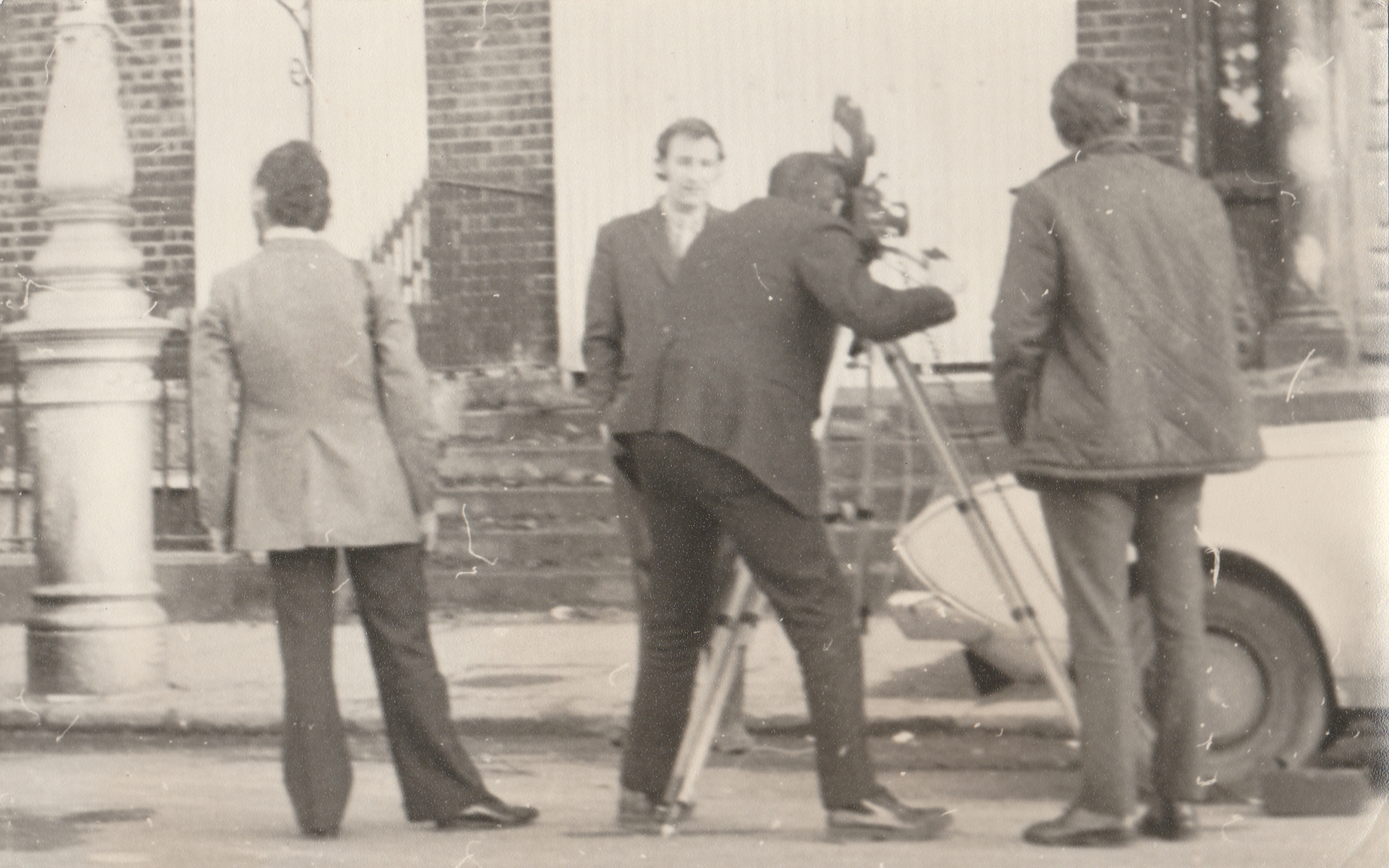
A film crew outside the embassy the morning after the fire

Embassy staff had been evacuated by the afternoon. Around 4 pm petrol bombs began to be thrown, without much effect. Finally, a man climbed a neighbouring building, and then across to an upper floor of the chancery, setting it alight, with the interior fire underway by 7pm (and by which time night had fallen). Dublin Fire Brigade could not reach the chancery, and the building was gutted.

Reflecting on the event 50 years later, the RTÉ correspondent Tom McCaughren felt the demonstration had been allowed to proceed as an "expression of anger".

A British insurance company's branch office in Dún Laoghaire was also destroyed. The Royal Air Force Club was attacked and several other British-owned shops around the country were vandalised.

== Subsequent history of Merrion Square building ==
The Electricity Supply Board bought the building in 1973 and then restored it. The row of houses 39-43 was offered for sale in 2019.
