= Embassy of Ireland, London =

Irish diplomatic mission to the United Kingdom

Embassy of Ireland in London
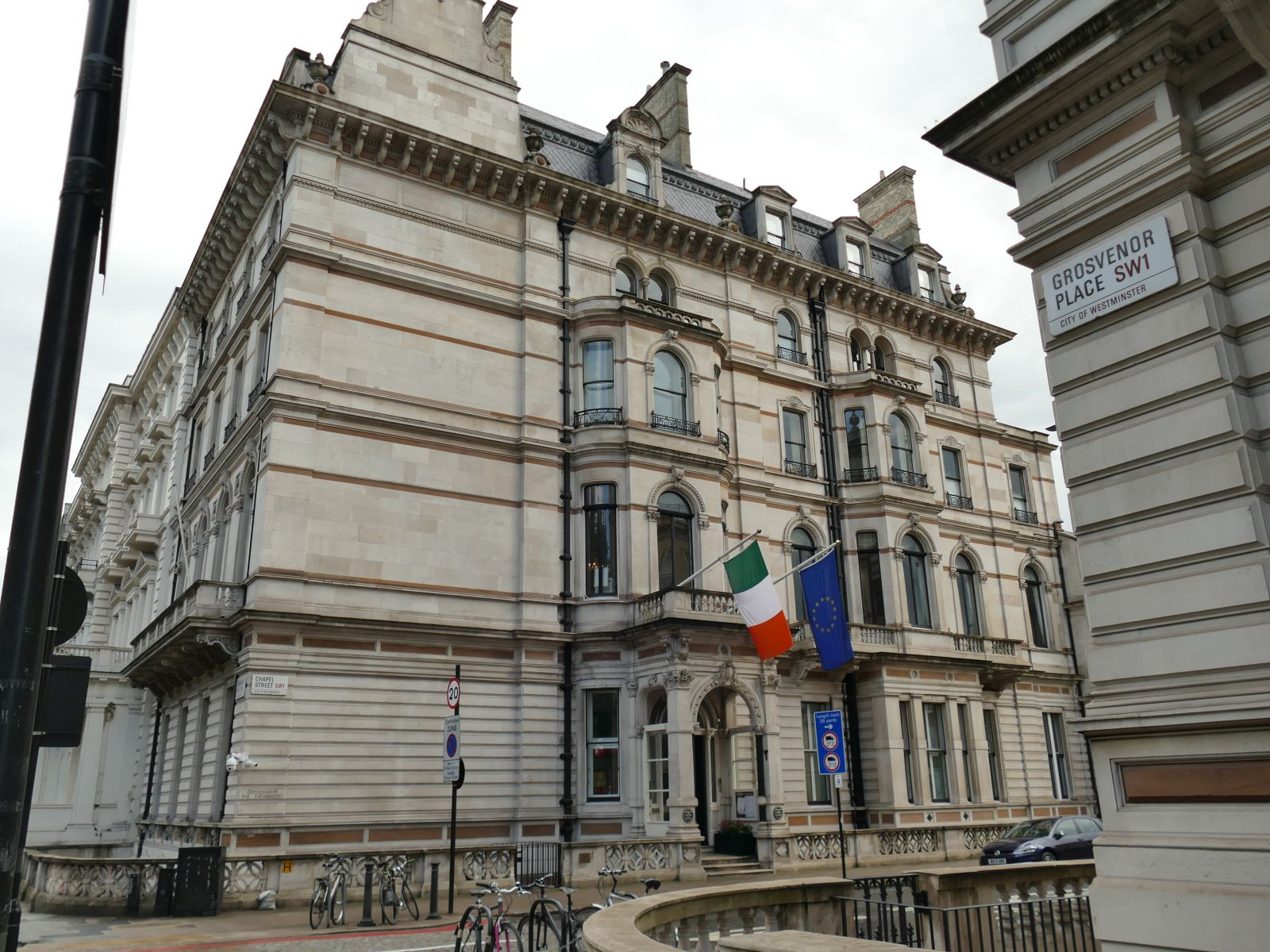
- Location: Belgravia, London
- Address: 17 Grosvenor Place, London SW1X 7HR
- Coordinates: 51°30′1.5″N 0°8′59.2″W
- Ambassador: Martin Fraser

The Embassy of Ireland in London is the diplomatic mission of Ireland in the United Kingdom. Ireland also maintains a Passport and Visa Office at 114A Cromwell Road, South Kensington.

== Building ==
The embassy is located in 17 Grosvenor Place, a Grade II listed building.

Built in 1868, this terraced town mansion is owned by the Duke of Westminster and was designed by British architect Thomas Cundy III. The building is designed in the eclectic "French Renaissance" style.

In exchange for the construction of the building, the Duke of Westminster leased the building to Robert John Waller for a period of 90 years until 1957. Waller leased the building to Arthur Wilson, who lived in the building until his death in 1909.

Upon Waller's death, the lease was passed to Ernest Guinness, a member of the Guinness family. Guinness surrendered the lease to the Duke of Westminster in 1948, who in turn leased the building to the Commissioners of Public Works in Ireland.

== See also ==
- Ireland–United Kingdom relations
- List of Ambassadors of Ireland to the United Kingdom

== Gallery ==
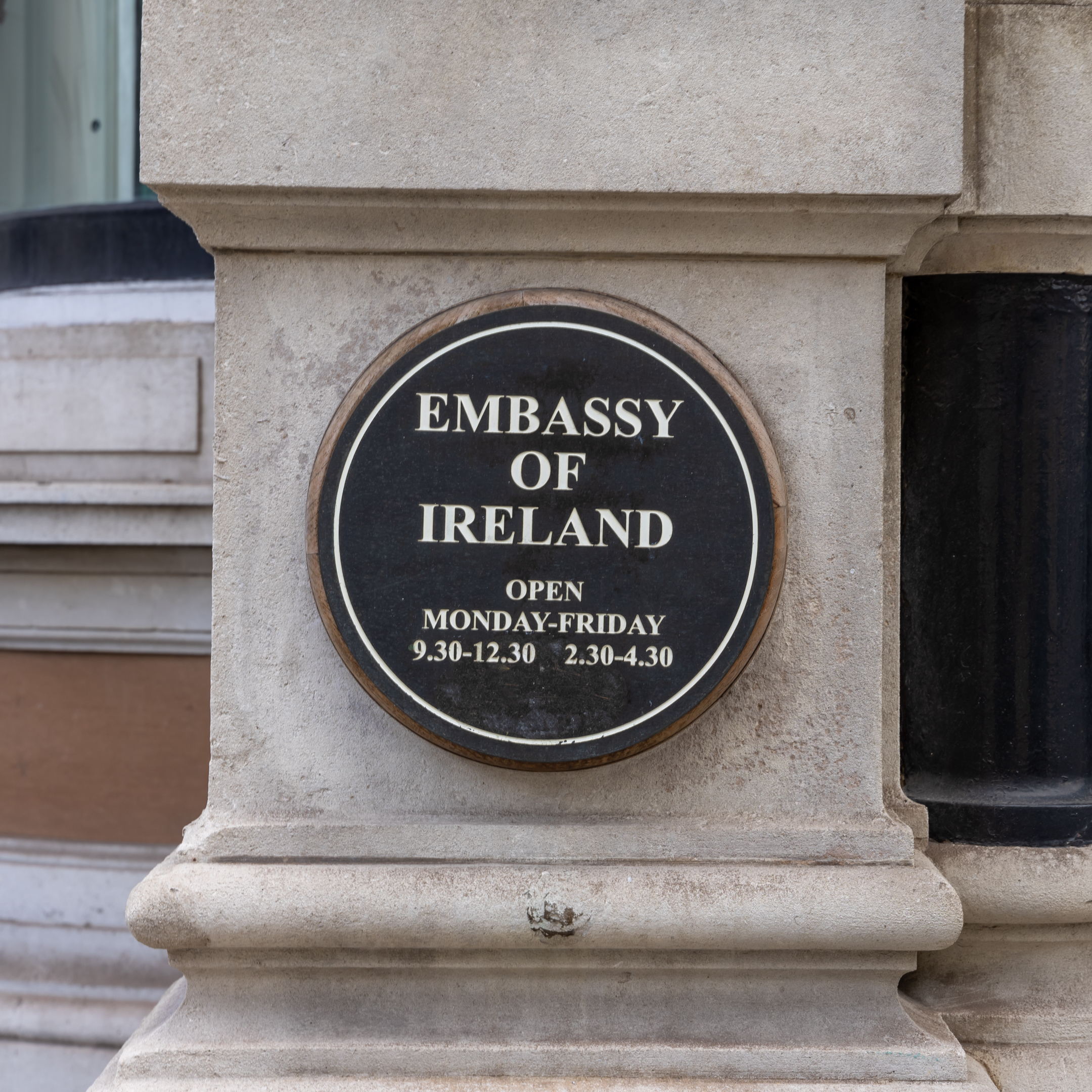
Plaque outside the embassy in English

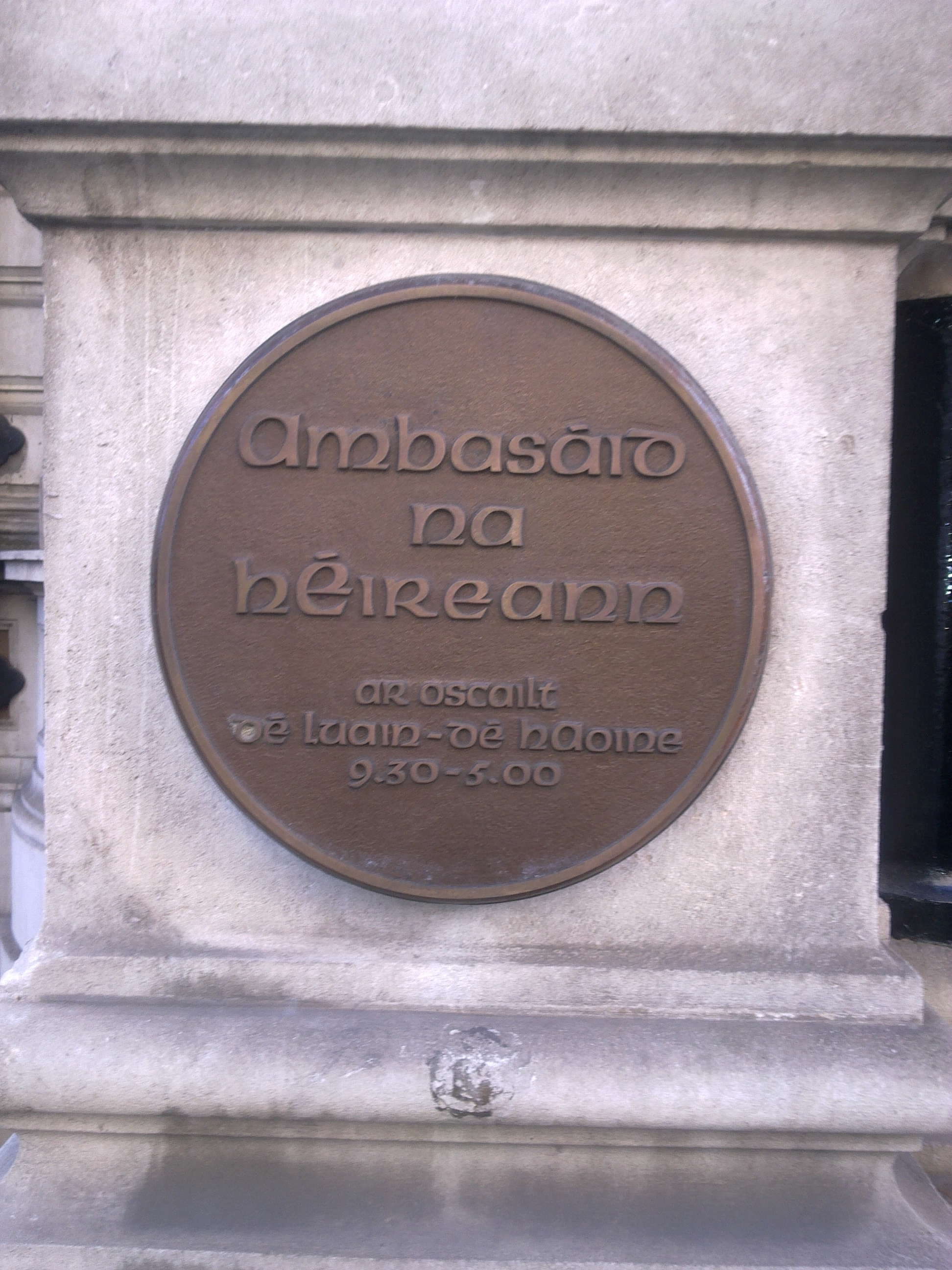
Plaque outside the embassy in Irish

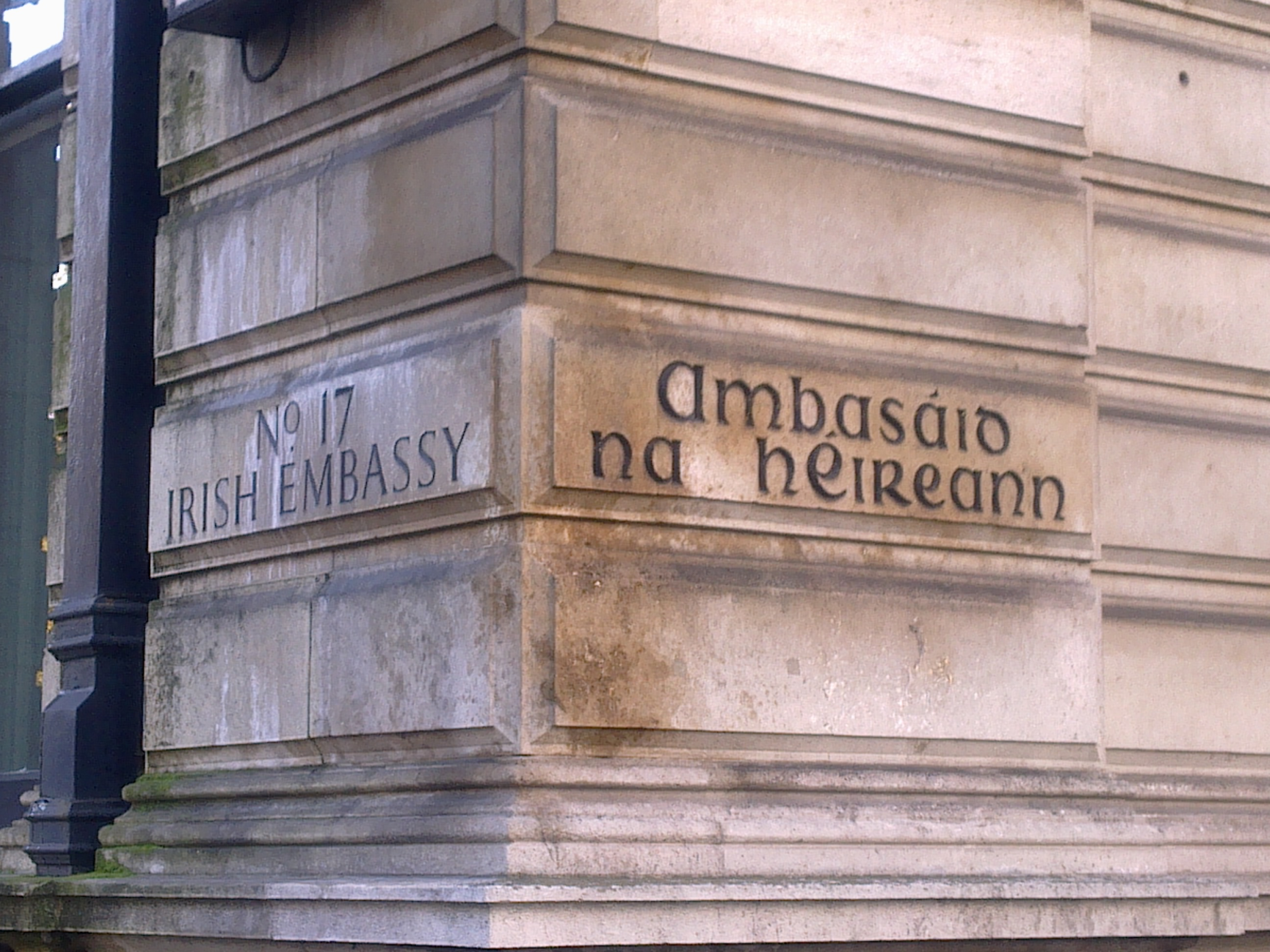
The address chiselled onto the embassy
