= Greece–Ireland relations =

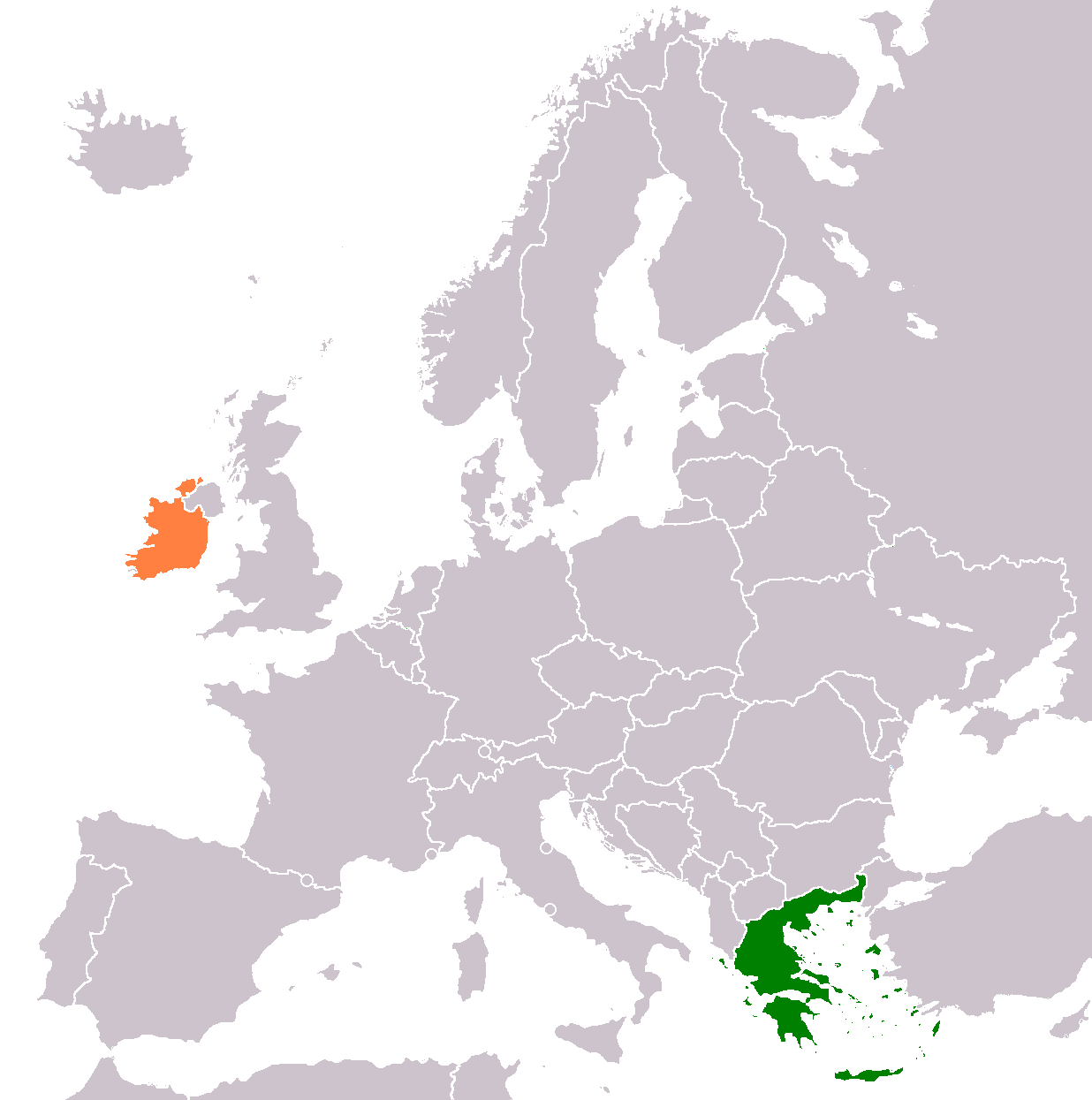

- Greece: Ireland

Greece and Ireland established diplomatic relations on 22 January 1975. Since 1977, Greece has an embassy in Dublin. Since 1978, Ireland has an embassy in Athens. The Irish Institute of Hellenic Studies at Athens opened in 1995, and is one of 17 foreign archaeological institutes in Athens. Both countries are full members of the Council of Europe, of the Organisation for Economic Co-operation and Development, of the European Union and of the Eurozone.

== List of recent bilateral visits ==
- In 2000, President of Greece Konstantinos Stephanopoulos visited Dublin.
- In 2002, President of Ireland Mary McAleese visited Athens.
- In May 2003, the Prime Minister of Greece Kostas Simitis visited Dublin
- In May 2004, the Prime Minister of Greece Kostas Karamanlis visited Dublin
- On 16 January 2006, the Prime Minister of Greece Kostas Karamanlis and Greek Foreign Minister Dora Bakoyannis visited Dublin.

== Bilateral agreements ==
- the Educational Agreement of 1980,
- the Agreement on the Avoidance of Double Taxation, put in force on 1 January 2005.

Most of the treaties and regulations between both countries are now done through the European union.

== Resident diplomatic missions ==
Greece has an embassy in Dublin, and Ireland has an embassy in Athens.

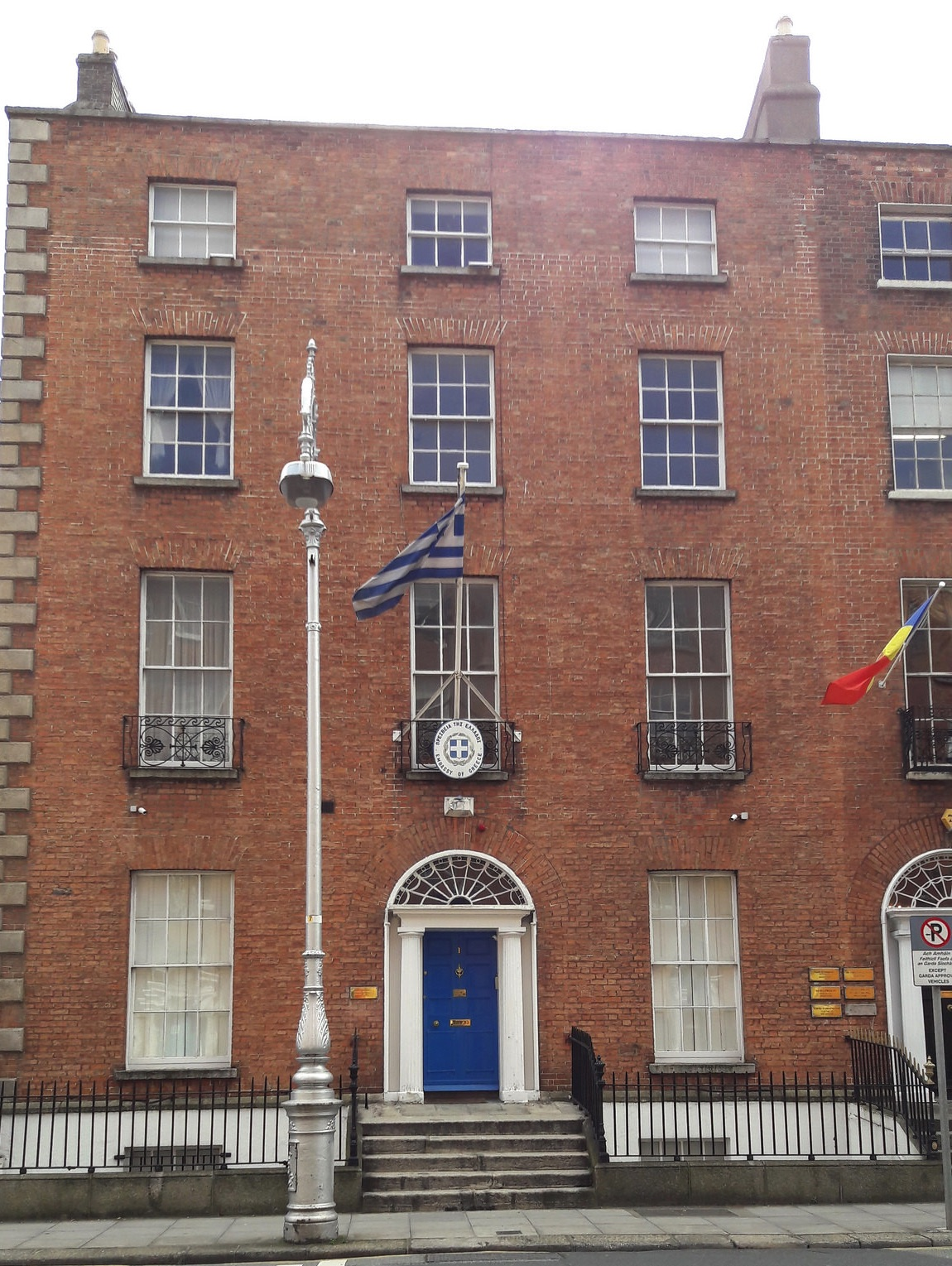
Embassy of Greece in Dublin

Embassy of Ireland in Athens

== See also ==
- Foreign relations of Greece
- Foreign relations of the Republic of Ireland
- Ireland-NATO relations
