= Ireland–Poland relations =

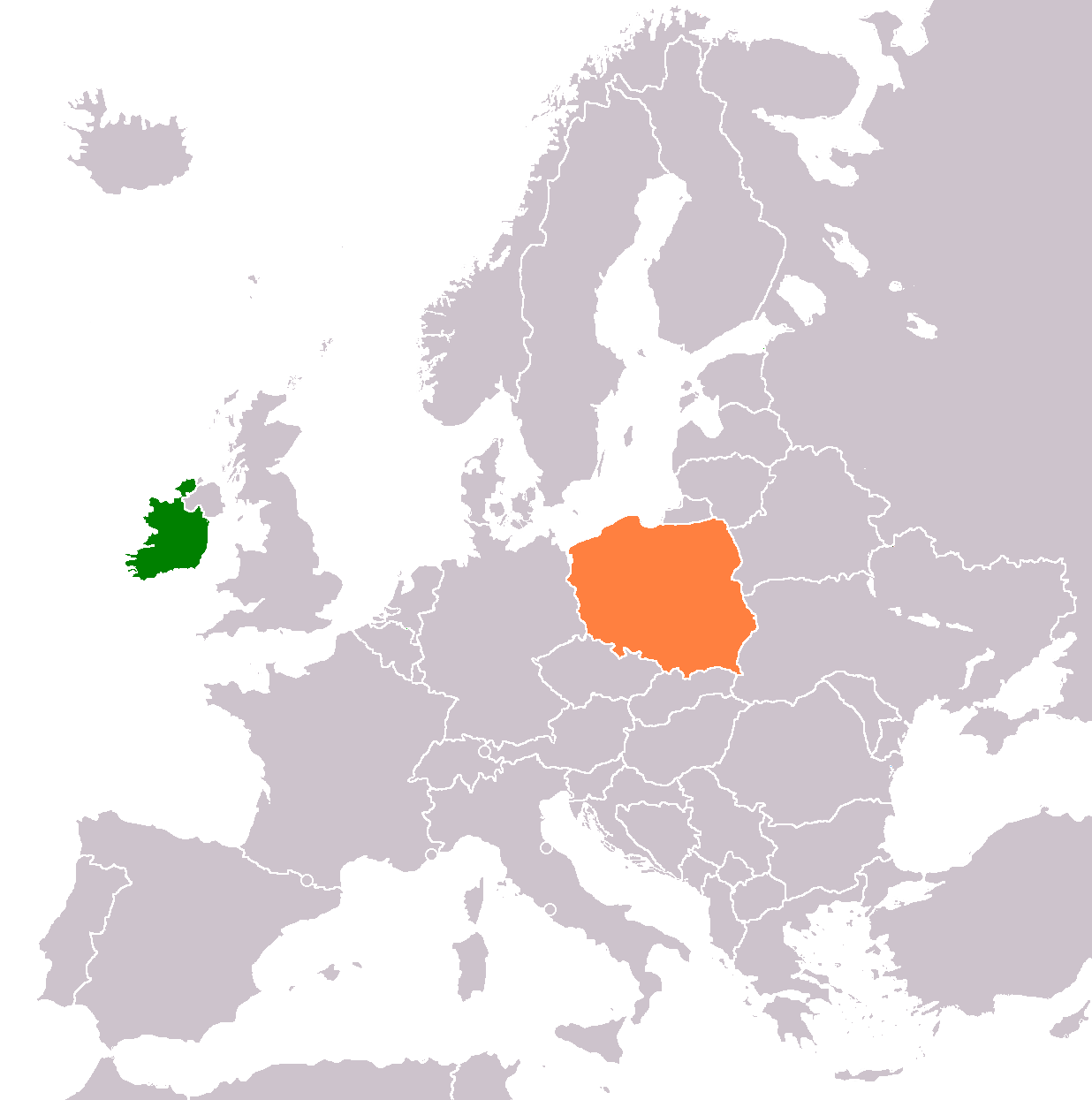

- Ireland: Poland

Both nations are members of the Council of Europe, European Union, OECD and OSCE.

== History ==
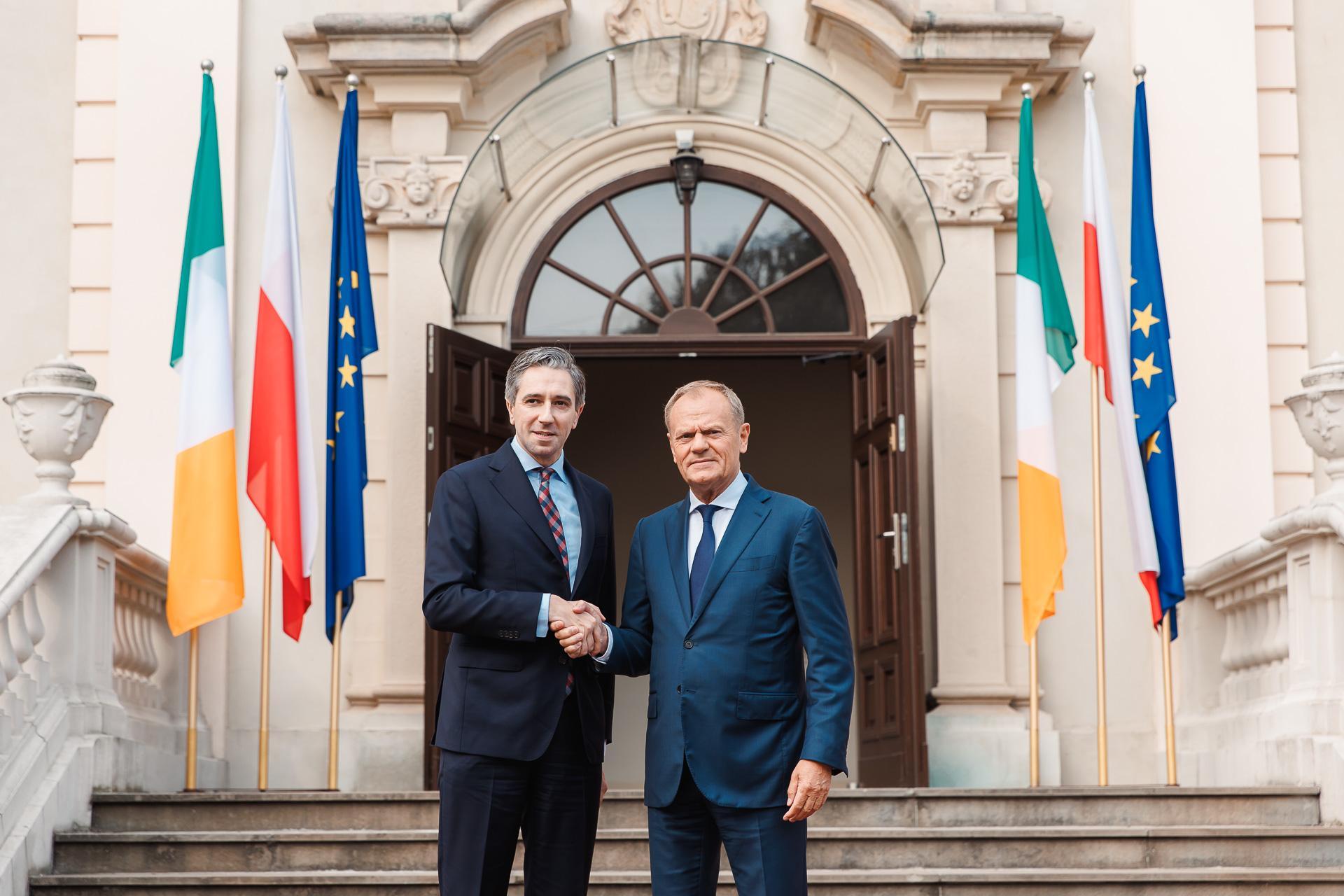
Irish Taoiseach Simon Harris with Polish Prime Minister Donald Tusk in Rzeszów, 5 September 2024

One of the first known contacts between Ireland and Poland took place in the late 17th century when Irishman Bernard Connor was appointed physician at the court of Polish King John III Sobieski. In 1694, Connor wrote a book titled History of Poland in the English language. In 1922, Ireland obtained its independence from the United Kingdom. Poland was among the first group of states to establish diplomatic relations with the independent Irish State, sending a Consul-General in 1929.

Official diplomatic relations between Ireland and Poland were established in 1976. During the Cold War, relations between both nations were limited. Ireland supported the Polish Solidarity movement. In 1981, the Irish Polish Society sent 20 containers of medicines, powdered milk, baby food and clothes to Poland, valued at more than £250,000. After the fall of communism in Poland, relations between both nations strengthened. In 1990, Ireland opened its embassy in Warsaw and in 1991, Poland opened its embassy in Dublin. In 1997, Polish President Aleksander Kwaśniewski paid an official visit to Ireland. In 2003 Irish President Mary McAleese paid a visit to Poland. In 2004, Poland joined the European Union and Ireland immediately opened its borders and labor market to Polish workers.

Although Ireland is not a member of NATO, Irish forces have fought alongside Polish forces in the War in Afghanistan and in peacekeeping missions in Kosovo and with EUFOR (Chad).

== High-level visits ==
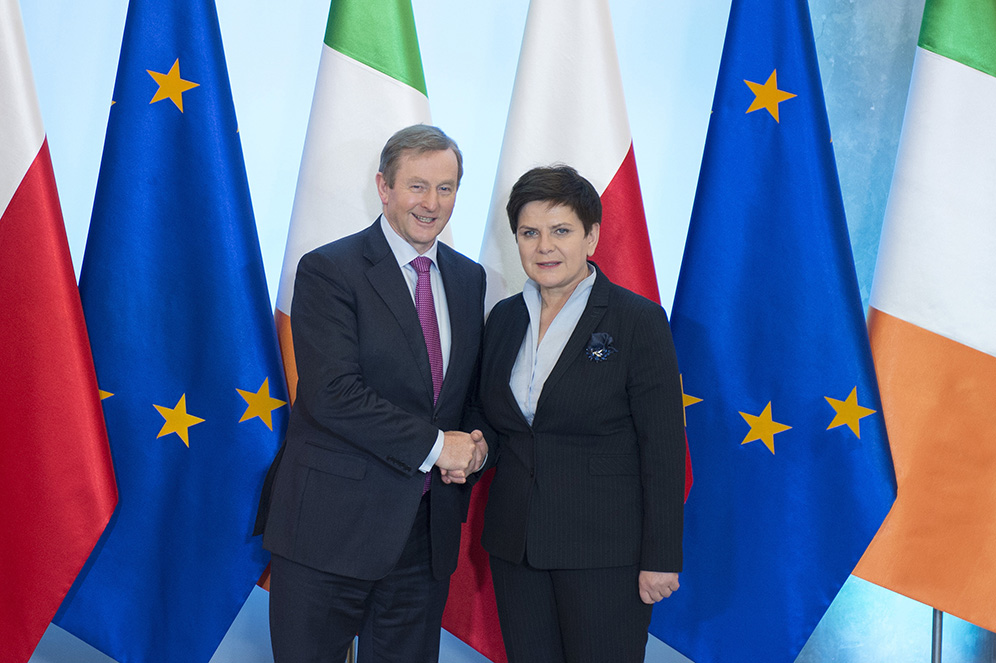
Enda Kenny visiting with Polish Prime Minister Beata Szydło in Warsaw, 2017.

Presidential and Prime Ministerial (Taoiseach) visits from Ireland to Poland

- President Mary McAleese (2003)
- Taoiseach Bertie Ahern (2005, 2008)
- President Michael D. Higgins (2012)
- Taoiseach Enda Kenny (2017)

Prime Ministerial and Presidential visits from Poland to Ireland

- President Aleksander Kwaśniewski (1997)
- President Lech Kaczyński (2007)

== Agreements ==
Throughout the years, both nations have signed several bilateral agreements such as an Agreement on the development of economic, industrial, scientific and technological cooperation (1977); Agreement for the avoidance of double taxation and the prevention of fiscal evasion with respect to taxes on income (1995) and an Accession Treaty (2003).

== Transport ==
There are direct flights between Ireland and Poland with Ryanair. There are over 60 flights per week between both nations.

== Diaspora ==
Ireland is home to a Polish community totaling approximately 100,000 people. The Polish language is the most spoken foreign language in Ireland.

== Trade ==
In 2018, trade between Ireland and Poland totaled US$2.7 billion. Irish exports to Poland include: prepared food, dairy products, beef and drinks (mainly alcohol such as Irish whiskey). Polish exports to Ireland include: ale of grain, poultry meat and beef, cakes, meat products, furs, computers, furniture, vans, juices, dairy products, confectionery and glassware. More than fifty Irish companies have factories or development facilities in Poland in sectors such as ICT, print and packaging, construction and client services. Poland is Ireland's 12th-largest exports market.

== International organizations ==
Ireland joined the EU in 1973. Poland joined the EU in 2004. While Poland became a member of NATO in 1999, Ireland has never been a member of NATO.

== Resident diplomatic missions ==
- Ireland has an embassy in Warsaw.
- Poland has an embassy in Dublin.
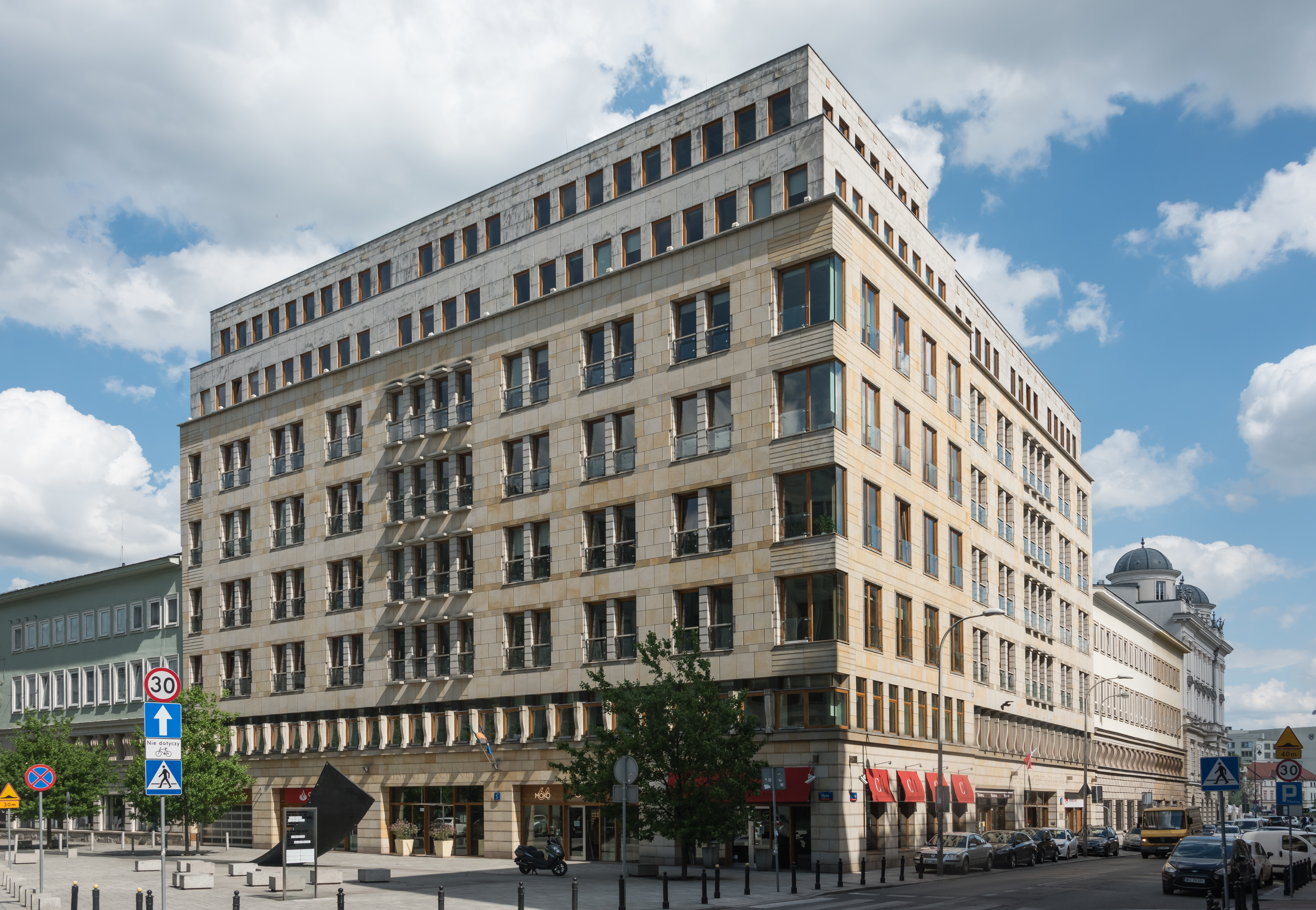
Embassy of Ireland in Warsaw

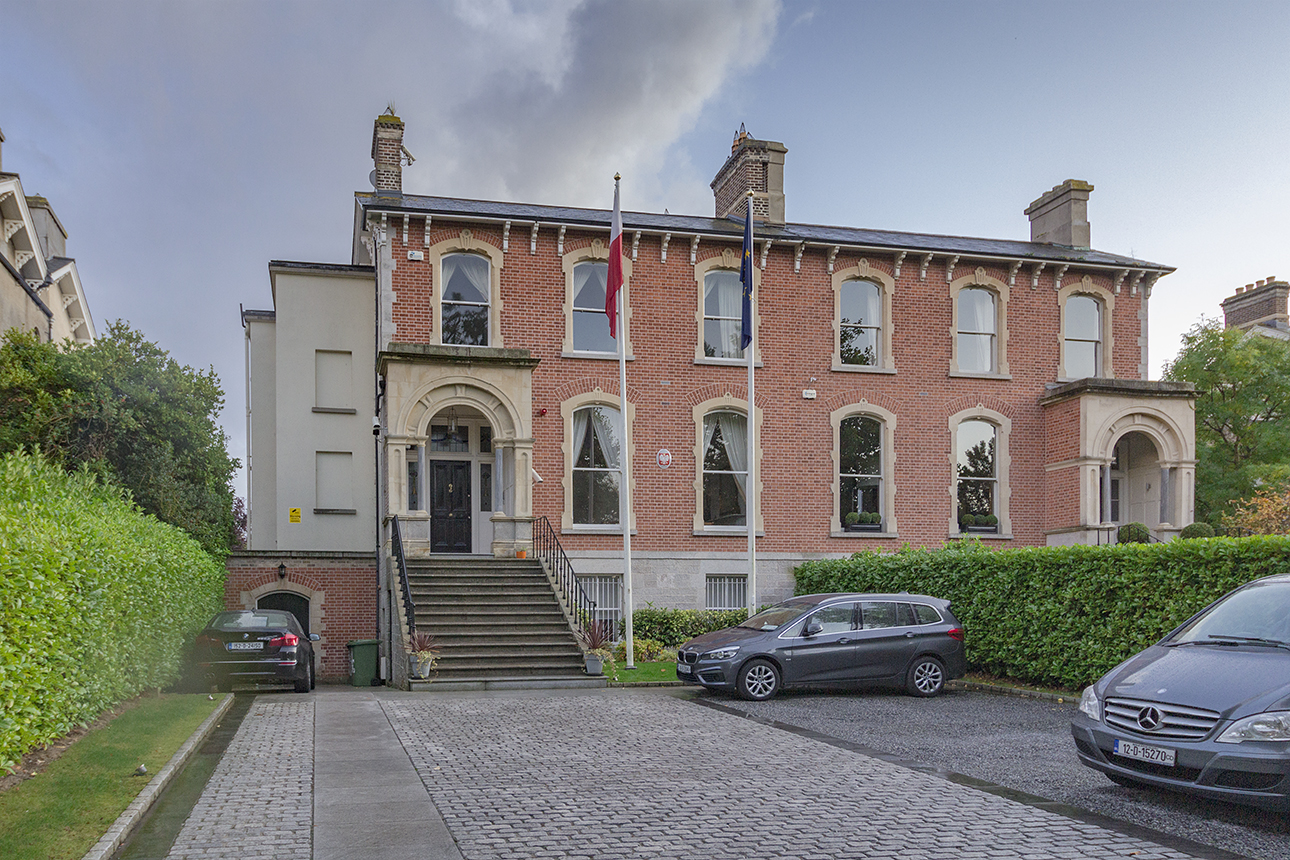
Embassy of Poland in Dublin

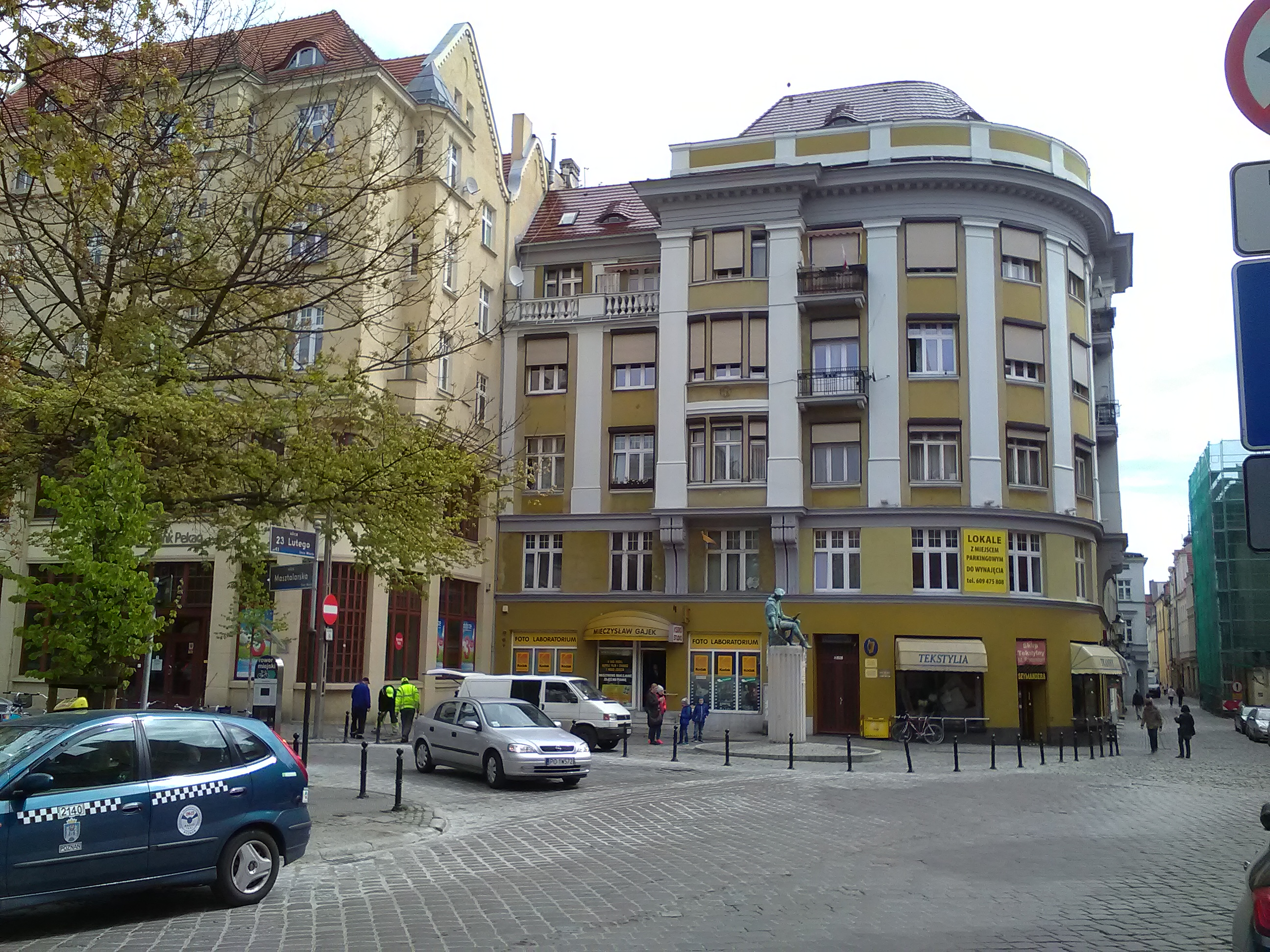
Honorary Consulate of Ireland in Poznań

== See also ==
- Foreign relations of Ireland
- Foreign relations of Poland
- Ireland-NATO relations
- NATO-EU relations
- Polish minority in the Republic of Ireland
