= Ireland–NATO relations =

- NATO: Ireland

The Republic of Ireland and the North Atlantic Treaty Organization (NATO) have had a formal relationship since 1999, when Ireland joined as a member of the NATO Partnership for Peace (PfP) program and signed up to NATO's Euro-Atlantic Partnership Council (EAPC). To date, Ireland has not sought to become a member of NATO due to its traditional policy of military neutrality. In 2024, the Republic of Ireland joined NATO's Individually Tailored Partnership Programme (ITPP) in order to increase its capabilities at countering potential threats to undersea infrastructure.

Ireland, Austria, Cyprus and Malta are the only members of the European Union that are not members of NATO.

== History ==
=== Background: Irish stance on military alliances prior to NATO's founding ===
Following the Irish War of Independence with the United Kingdom, the Irish Free State was established in 1922. Its constitution stated, "Save in the case of actual invasion, the Irish Free State ... shall not be committed to active participation in any war without the assent of the Oireachtas [parliament]".

Many countries made neutrality declarations during World War II. However, Ireland (which refers to the period as the emergency) was one of a handful of European states to remain neutral to the end of the war. For Taoiseach Éamon de Valera, the emphasis of Irish neutrality was on the preservation of Irish sovereignty. The Irish government had good reason to be concerned that supporting either side in the conflict could reignite grievances of the Irish Civil War, as there were pro- and anti-fascist movements in Ireland. The possibility that the Irish Republican Army might link up with German agents (in line with the Irish republican tradition of courting allies in Europe against the colonial power of the UK to secure their full independence), and thereby compromising Irish non-involvement, was considered. Additionally, there were fears that the United Kingdom, eager to secure Irish ports for their air and naval forces, might use the attacks as a pretext for an invasion of Ireland. It was believed that Ireland would take the German side if the United Kingdom attempted to invade Ireland, but would take the British side if invaded by Nazi Germany. In 1940, British envoy Malcolm MacDonald proposed an end to the partition of Ireland and acceptance of "the principle of a United Ireland" if the independent Irish state abandoned its neutrality and immediately joined the war against Germany and Italy. However De Valera rejected the proposals, as he worried that since unification would need to be agreed upon by "representatives of the government of Éire and the government of Northern Ireland" which distrusted the other intensely, there was "no guarantee that in the end we would have a united Ireland" and that it "would commit us definitely to an immediate abandonment of our neutrality".

Ireland's fulfillment to the letter of the rules of neutrality has been questioned. Ireland supplied important secret intelligence to the Allies, for instance, the date of D-Day was decided on the basis of incoming Atlantic weather information, some of it supplied by Ireland but kept from Germany. Ireland also secretly allowed Allied aircraft to use the Donegal Corridor, making it possible for British planes to attack German U-boats in the mid-Atlantic. While both Axis and Allied pilots who crash landed in Ireland were interned, downed Royal Air Force airmen were repatriated.

=== 1949–1973: Early relations ===
Ireland had been willing in 1949 to negotiate a bilateral defence pact with the United States, but opposed joining NATO until the question of Northern Ireland was resolved with the United Kingdom (see The Troubles 1968–1998).

During the negotiations to establish NATO in 1949, the Irish government was consulted on potentially becoming a member. A representative of the US State Department informed Irish ambassador Seán Nunan that the states founding NATO wanted Ireland to join, and that if the Irish government was supportive it would be formally invited by the other parties. While the Irish government expressed its support for the goals of NATO, it opposed joining as it did not wish to be in an alliance with the United Kingdom (who was a signatory to the agreement founding NATO) with which it disputed the sovereignty over Northern Ireland. Thus Irish reunification became a condition for Ireland joining NATO, which was not acceptable to the UK. Ireland offered to set up a separate alliance with the United States but this was refused. This offer was linked in part to the $133 million received from the Marshall Aid Plan. Subsequently, Irish neutrality became more established and the country never applied to join NATO as a full member.

=== 1973–1999: Initial European co-operation ===
EC members in 1973 New EC members admitted in 1973

Ireland continued their policy of military neutrality during the Cold War, though the country aligned economically and politically with the west and joined the European Communities (EC) in 1973. Following the end of the Cold War the EC was transformed into the European Union, and a Common Foreign and Security Policy was adopted.

=== 1999–present: Partnership for Peace, EU defence co-operation ===
Official NATO–Ireland relations began in 1999 when Ireland became a signatory to NATO's Partnership for Peace programme and the alliance's Euro-Atlantic Partnership Council. Since then, NATO and Ireland have actively cooperated on peacekeeping, humanitarian, rescue, and crisis management issues and have developed practical cooperation in other military areas of mutual interest, under Ireland's Individual Partnership Programme (IPP) and Individual Partnership and Cooperation Programme (IPCP), which is jointly agreed every two years. Irish cooperation with NATO is centred around the country's historic policy of neutrality in armed conflicts, which allows the Irish military to deploy on peacekeeping and humanitarian missions where there is a mandate from the United Nations (UN Security Council resolution or UN General Assembly resolution), subject to cabinet and Dáil Éireann (Irish lower house of parliament) approval. This is known as Ireland's "triple-lock" policy.

Ireland participates in the Partnership for Peace (PfP) Planning and Review Process (PARP), which aims to increase the interoperability of the Irish armed forces, the Defence Forces, with other NATO member states and bring them into line with accepted international military standards so as to successfully deploy with other professional forces on peace operations overseas.

Ireland supports the ongoing NATO-led Kosovo Force (KFOR) and has done so since 1999, and supplied a limited number of troops to the NATO-led International Security Assistance Force (ISAF) in Afghanistan (2001–2014), as these were sanctioned by UN Security Council resolutions. The ISAF counter-IED programme in Afghanistan was largely developed by senior officers from the Irish Army Ordnance Corps. Previously in 1997, before Ireland had a formal relationship with the alliance, it deployed personnel in support of the NATO-led peacekeeping operation in Bosnia and Herzegovina where much of its forces formed part of an international military police company primarily operating in Sarajevo.

Ireland sought recognition for its neutrality in EU treaties, and argued that its neutrality did not mean that Ireland should avoid engagement in international affairs such as peacekeeping operations. Since the enactment of the Lisbon Treaty, EU members are bound by TEU, Article 42.7, which obliges states to assist a fellow member that is the victim of armed aggression. It accords "an obligation of aid and assistance by all the means in [other member states'] power" but would "not prejudice the specific character of the security and defence policy of certain Member States" (neutral policies), allowing members to respond with non-military aid. Ireland's constitution prohibits participating in such a common defence.

With the launch of Permanent Structured Cooperation (PESCO) in defence at the end of 2017, the EU's activity on military matters has increased. The policy was designed to be inclusive and allows states to opt in or out of specific forms of military cooperation. That has allowed most of the neutral states to participate, but opinions still vary. Some members of the Irish Parliament considered Ireland's joining PESCO as an abandonment of neutrality. It was passed with the government arguing that its opt-in nature allowed Ireland to "join elements of PESCO that were beneficial such as counter-terrorism, cybersecurity and peacekeeping... what we are not going to be doing is buying aircraft carriers and fighter jets".

Currently no major political party supports accession to NATO as their party line. There has been, and continues to be, a minority of individual politicians and groups of politicians who support Ireland joining NATO, mainly but not limited to the centre-right Fine Gael party (in 2013, the party's youth wing Young Fine Gael passed a motion calling on the Irish government to start accession talks with NATO). Though its stance was softened during the 2024 election campaign, the republican party Sinn Féin has long supported both withdrawal from PfP and passage of a constitutional amendment to prohibit the country from joining a military alliance like NATO. The Dáil Éireann has considered and defeated such an amendment in April 2019 and in November 2023.

It had been widely understood that a referendum would have to be held before any changes could be made to the policy of neutrality or to joining NATO. with Irish Constitutional lawyers pointed to the precedent set by the 1987 case Crotty v. An Taoiseach as suggesting it would be necessary, and that any attempt to join NATO without a referendum would likely be legally challenged in the country's courts in a similar way. However, in June 2022, after the Russian invasion of Ukraine had begun, Taoiseach Micheál Martin stated that there was no legal requirement for a referendum on the matter since it was "a policy decision of government”, though he later clarified that politically it would be necessary. Former Taoiseach Leo Varadkar has also highlighted the possibility that a United Ireland would likely have to reconsider defense arrangements, namely those with NATO, as the six counties of Northern Ireland are currently part of the alliance.

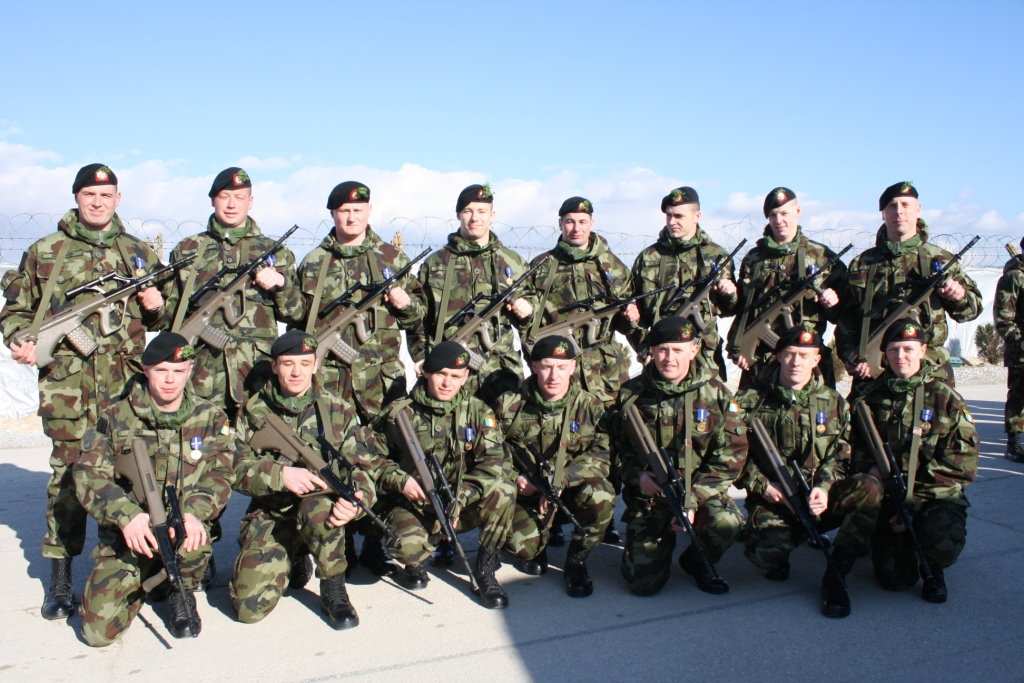
Irish Army soldiers as part of Kosovo Force receive the NATO Medal for Kosovo (March 2010)

Former Secretary General of NATO Anders Fogh Rasmussen said during a visit to Dublin in 2013 that the "door is open" for Ireland to join NATO at any time, saying that the country would be "warmly welcomed" and is already viewed as a "very important partner".

==== 2001–2005: US military stopovers in Ireland ====
Ireland's air facilities are regularly used by the United States military for the transit of military personnel overseas, mainly to the Middle East. The Irish government began supplying military and civilian air facilities in Ireland for use by the armed forces of the United States during the 1991 First Gulf War. Following the September 11 attacks in 2001, the Irish government offered the use of Irish airspace and airports to the US military in support of the war in Afghanistan and the 2003 invasion of Iraq, on the condition that aircraft be unarmed, with no cargo of arms, ammunition or explosives, and do not engage in intelligence gathering, and that the flights in question do not form part of military exercises or operations at the time. Casement Aerodrome, Baldonnel (military) and Shannon Airport (civil), used as stopover hubs, have seen more than 2.4 million American troops pass through from 2002 to 2014. An average of more than 500 US troops passed through Shannon every day during that period.

US use of Baldonnel and Shannon has been the subject of controversy in Ireland due to revelations in December 2005 by the BBC investigative television programme Newsnight that Shannon Airport was used on at least 33 occasions for secret Central Intelligence Agency (CIA) flights, operated by front companies, as part of a US government policy known as "extraordinary rendition". The New York Times also reported the number to be 33, though referring to "Ireland" as a whole rather than Shannon specifically, while Amnesty International alleged the number of flights to be over 50. Baldonnel has seen similar claims, but these are impossible to verify as it is a military airbase. Both the US and Irish authorities have denied the allegations. According to leaked American diplomatic cables (WikiLeaks) from the US Embassy in Dublin, the Irish Minister for Foreign Affairs at the time told the chief of mission that the Irish authorities suspected the CIA had on a number of occasions used aircraft disguised as commercial flights to transfer prisoners detained in Afghanistan to Guantanamo Bay, Cuba for interrogation and detention – using Shannon to refuel in the process – and warning of the legal implications for both Ireland and the United States as a result.

==== Agreements with the UK on air defence ====
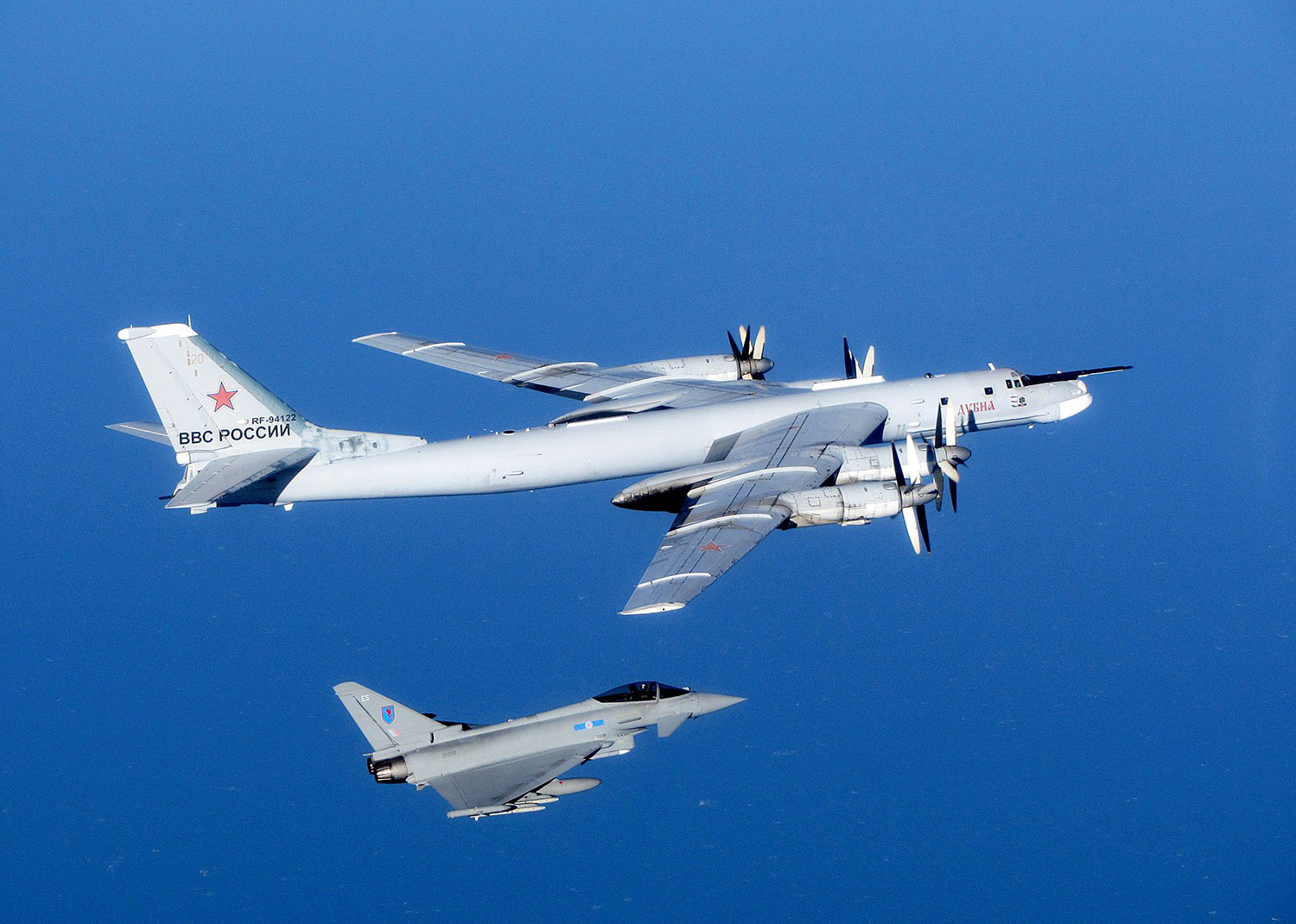
An RAF Typhoon intercepting a Russian Tupolev Tu-95 bomber in 2014

Since the 2014 Russian annexation of Crimea, Russian bomber aircraft have deliberately flown into Irish-controlled airspace several times, without warning or permission, and with their transponders switched off. This poses a safety threat to civilian airliners. In February 2015, two Russian Tupolev Tu-95 "Bear" bombers twice flew into Irish-controlled airspace, with their transponders switched off, causing serious concern at the Irish Aviation Authority (IAA), which was forced to divert civilian passenger aircraft out of the path of the bombers. Sources in the Norwegian and British militaries said that the bombers were carrying unarmed nuclear warheads. The bombers flew within 25 nautical miles of the Irish coast, close to Irish sovereign airspace, and were intercepted by RAF Eurofighter Typhoon jets.

In July 2015, the Irish government revealed plans to purchase a ground-based long-range air surveillance radar system for the Irish Aviation Authority and Defence Forces to keep track of covert aircraft flying in Irish-controlled airspace, including military aircraft that do not file a flight plan and have their transponders switched off. Minister for Defence Simon Coveney said the increased capability would give better coverage of the Atlantic airspace over which the IAA has responsibility. The long-range surveillance radar is reported to cost €10 million, and is seen as a priority purchase to provide the civilian and military authorities with an improved competency in monitoring aerial incursions. The decision was widely attributed directly to the Russian flights.

The possibility of a hijacked airliner in Irish airspace would most likely result in a Quick Reaction Alert (QRA) response by NATO aircraft. In 2016 it was reported in the Irish press that, several years earlier, confidential agreements were made between the Irish and British governments concerning the protection of Irish airspace from terrorist threats. The reports revealed that the Irish Department of Defence, Department of Foreign Affairs and Irish Aviation Authority entered into a bilateral agreement with the British RAF, Civil Aviation Authority, Ministry for Defence and Foreign and Commonwealth Office. This allows the British military to conduct armed operations inside Irish sovereign or Irish-controlled airspace in the event of an airborne terrorist attack.

== Opinion polling on Irish NATO membership ==
Polls on Irish membership of NATO
| Dates conducted | Pollster | Client | Sample size | Support | Opposed | Neutral or DK | Lead | Ref. |
|---|---|---|---|---|---|---|---|---|
| 7 March 2024 | Sweden accedes to NATO | | | | | | | |
| June 2023 | Red C | Business Post | ? | 34% | 38% | 28% | 4% | |
| 4 April 2023 | Finland accedes to NATO | | | | | | | |
| August 2022 | Behaviour Wise | | 1,845 | 52% | 48% | - | 4% | |
| April 2022 | Behaviors and Attitudes | The Sunday Times | 957 | 30% | 70% | - | 40% | |
| 26 March 2022 | Red C | Business Post | ? | 48% | 39% | 13% | 9% | |
| 4 March 2022 | Ireland Thinks | Sunday Independent | 1,011 | 37% | 52% | 11% | 15% | |
| 24 February 2022 | Russia invades Ukraine | | | | | | | |
| 16 March 2014 | Russia annexes Crimea | | | | | | | |
| 7 August 2008 | Russia invades Georgia | | | | | | | |
| 5 October 1996 | MRBI | Irish Times | ? | 13% | ? | ? | ? | |

== Ireland's foreign relations with NATO member states ==
- Albania
- Belgium
- Bulgaria
- Canada
- Croatia
- Czech Republic
- Denmark
- Estonia
- Finland
- France
- Germany
- Greece
- Hungary
- Iceland
- Italy
- Latvia
- Lithuania
- Luxembourg
- Montenegro
- Netherlands
- North Macedonia
- Norway
- Poland
- Portugal
- Romania
- Slovakia
- Slovenia
- Spain
- Sweden
- Turkey
- United Kingdom
- United States

== See also ==
- Foreign relations of Ireland
- Foreign relations of NATO
- Irish neutrality
- Neutral member states in the European Union
- Ireland–United States relations
- Ireland–United Kingdom relations
- Enlargement of NATO
- European Union–United Kingdom relations
- European Union–NATO relations
- Ireland–United Kingdom border
- NATO open door policy
- Partnership for Peace

=== NATO relations of other EU member states outside NATO ===
- Austria–NATO relations
- Cyprus–NATO relations
- Malta–NATO relations
