= Ireland–Turkey relations =

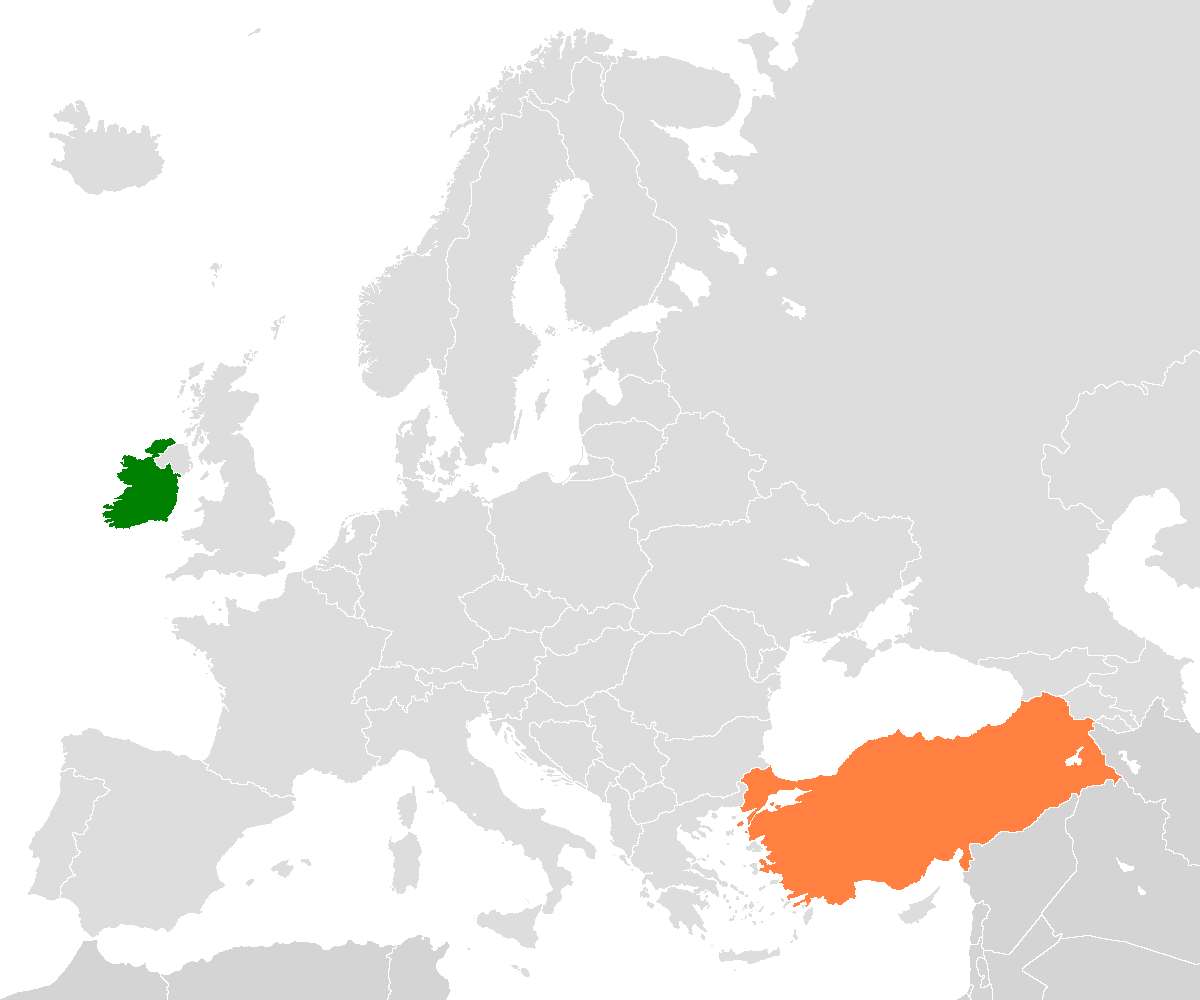

- Ireland: Turkey

Ireland and Turkey maintain bilateral relations. Formal relations were established in 1972. Ireland's embassy in Ankara was opened in 1998. Turkey has had an embassy in Dublin since 1973. Both countries are full members of the Council of Europe, the Organisation for Economic Co-operation and Development (OECD), the Organization for Security and Co-operation in Europe (OSCE), the Union for the Mediterranean and the World Trade Organization (WTO). Furthermore, Ireland is an EU member and Turkey is an EU candidate.

== History ==
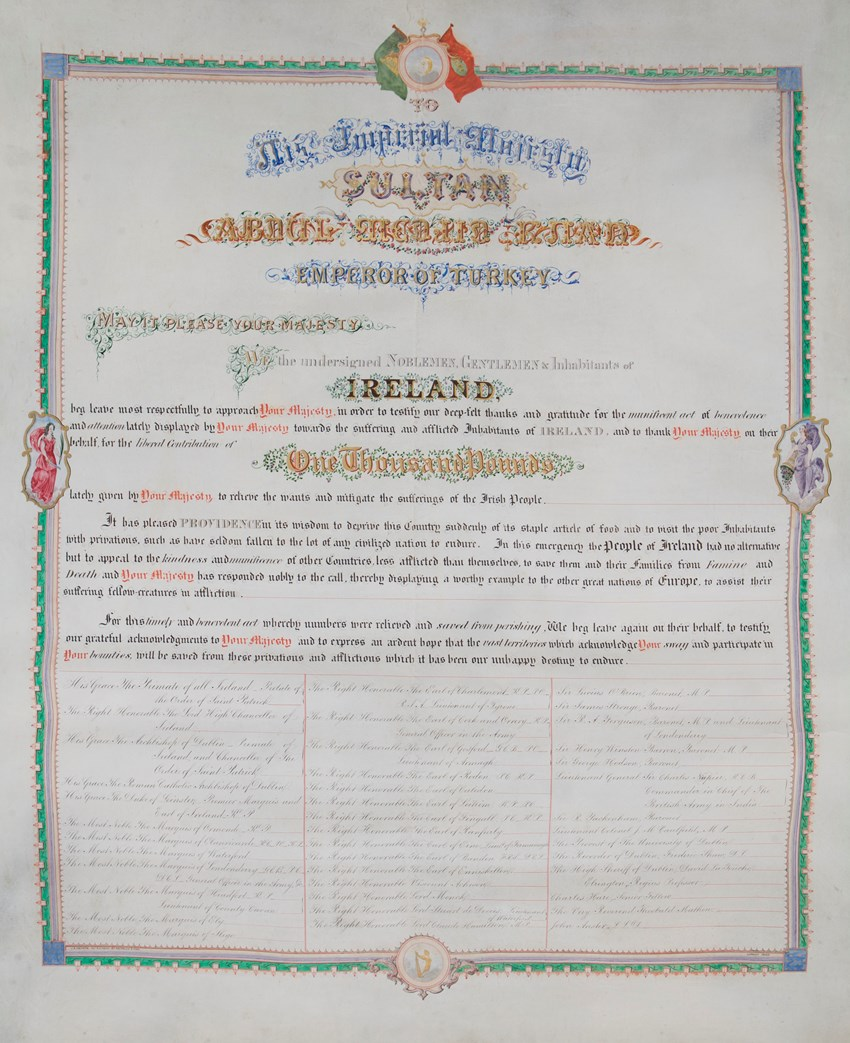
Letter of Gratitude to Ottoman Empire

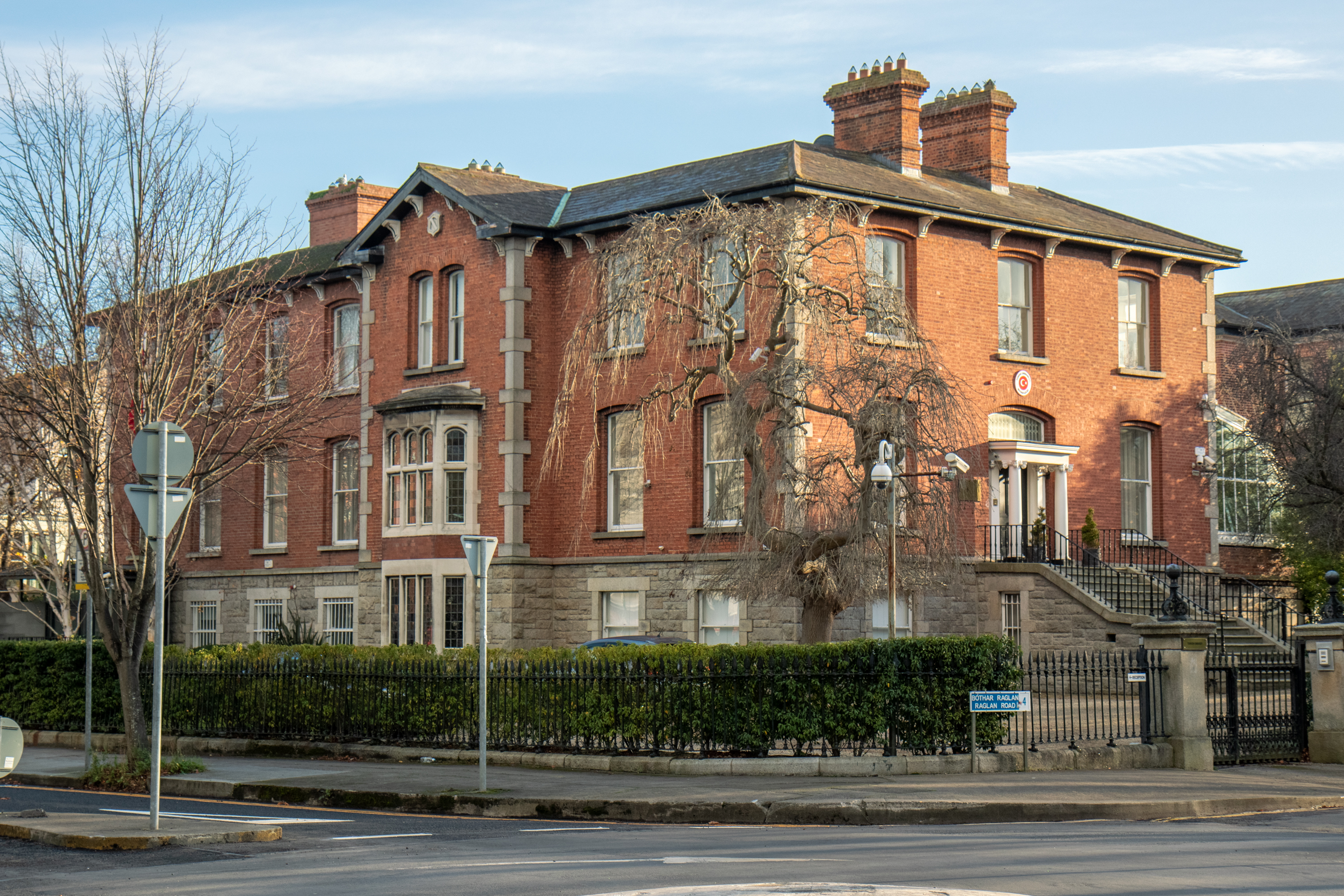
Embassy of Turkey in Dublin

During the Great Famine in Ireland of the 1840s, Ottoman Sultan Abdülmecid (pronounced Abdul Majid) donated £1,000 to famine relief (equivalent to between US$84,000 and US$216,000 in 2019). A letter written by Irish notables in the Ottoman archives explicitly thanks the Sultan for his help.

According to legend, the Sultan had originally intended to send £10,000, but either British diplomats or his own ministers requested that the Sultan send only £1,000, so as not to violate protocol by donating more than Queen Victoria, who had sent £2,000. He is also said to have sent three or five ships full of food. Shipping records relating to the port appear not to have survived. Newspaper reports suggest that ships from Thessaloniki (Selanik) in the Ottoman Empire sailed up the River Boyne in May 1847, although it has also been claimed that the river was dry at the time. In 1995, the Drogheda town hall erected a placard in commemoration. In 2012, plans were announced to produce a film on the subject, starring Colin Farrell and several Turkish stars.

The claim that he had wanted to give £10,000 first appears in Taylor & Mackay's Life and Times of Sir Robert Peel (1851), but the book is not referenced and no source is given. A second source, dating to 1894, is more explicit: the Irish nationalist William J. O'Neill Daunt claimed to have heard from the son of the sultan's personal physician that he "had intended to give £10,000 to the famine-stricken Irish, but was deterred by the British ambassador, Lord Cowley, as Her Majesty, who had only subscribed £1000, would have been annoyed had a foreign sovereign given a larger sum…"

== Economic relations ==
In 2011, bilateral trade volume reached 1,19 billion USD with an Irish surplus of US$485 million. By the end of March 2012, 289 companies with Irish capital were active in Turkey. Ireland's direct investment in Turkey reached US$337 million in 2011.

Turkish Airlines currently operate two daily flights between Dublin and Istanbul, with seasonal flights to Antalya. Aer Lingus, Ryanair and SunExpress also operate seasonal flights to some Mediterranean Turkish cities.

== Resident diplomatic missions ==
- Ireland has an embassy in Ankara.
- Turkey has an embassy in Dublin.

== See also ==
- Foreign relations of Ireland
- Foreign relations of Turkey
- Ireland-NATO relations
- Turkey-EU relations
  - Accession of Turkey to the EU
- NATO-EU relations
- Turks in Ireland
- Turks in Europe
- Town arms of Drogheda
