= Polish minority in Ireland =

Ethnic group located in the Republic of Ireland

Polish: Polska mniejszość w Irlandii
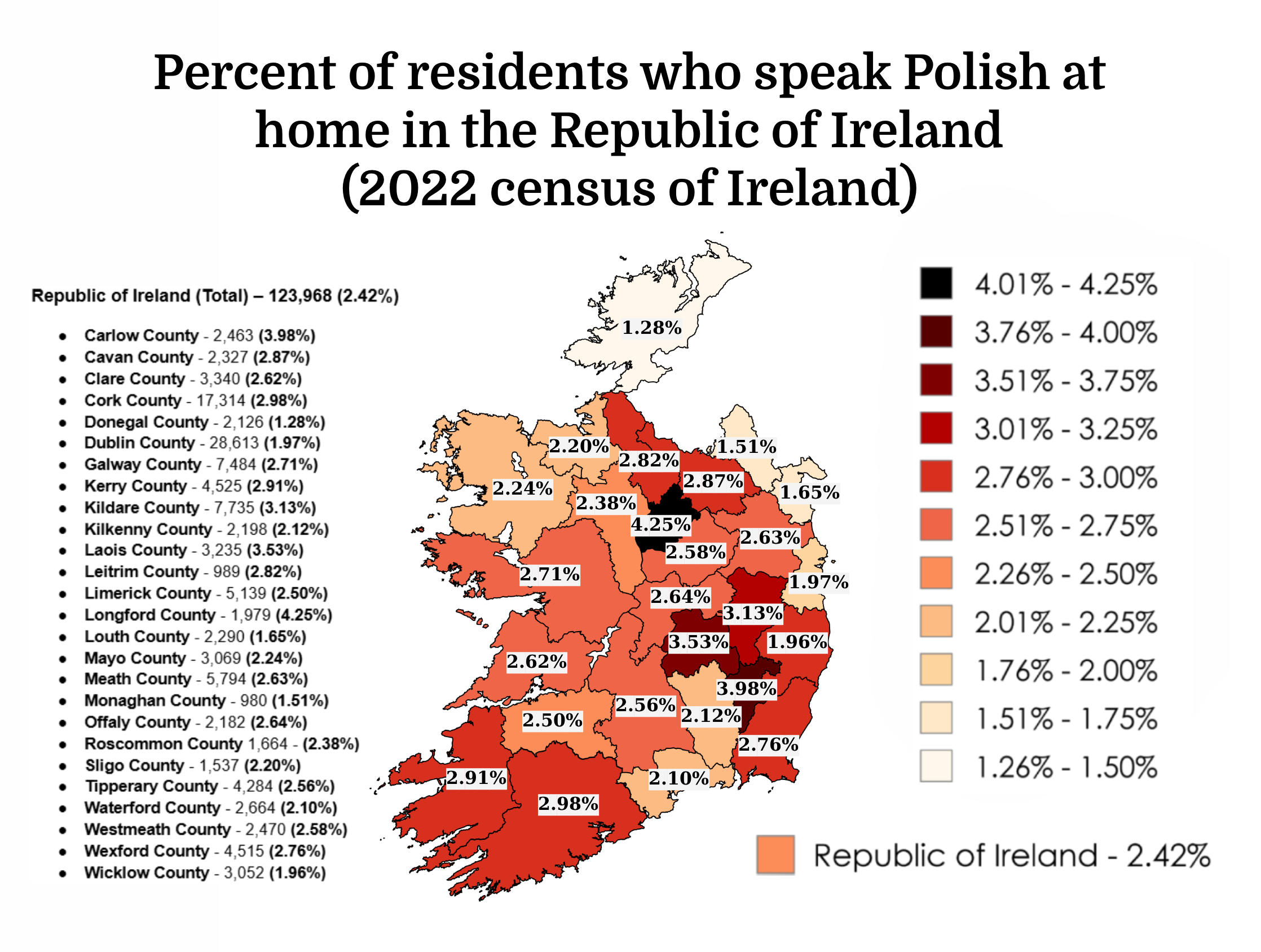
- Percentage of Polish speakers in the Republic of Ireland by county (2022 census of Ireland)

Total population
- 93,680

Regions with significant populations
- All over Ireland, especially Limerick, Dublin, Portlaoise, Cork, Waterford and Galway.

Languages
- Polish, English, sometimes Irish

Religion
- Catholic, Polish Orthodox, atheism

Related ethnic groups
- Polish diaspora

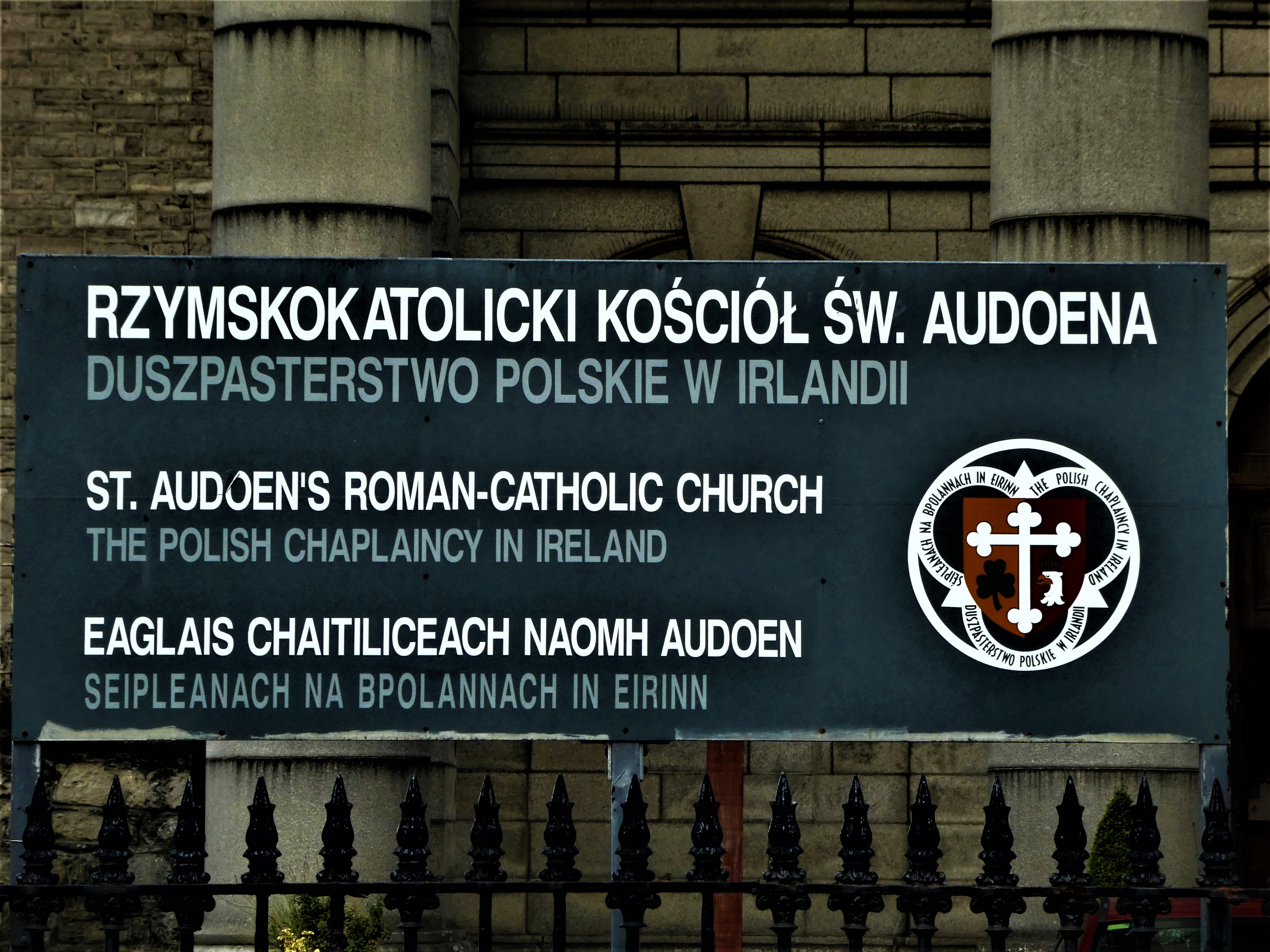
Trilingual sign at St Audoen's Church, Dublin (Roman Catholic)

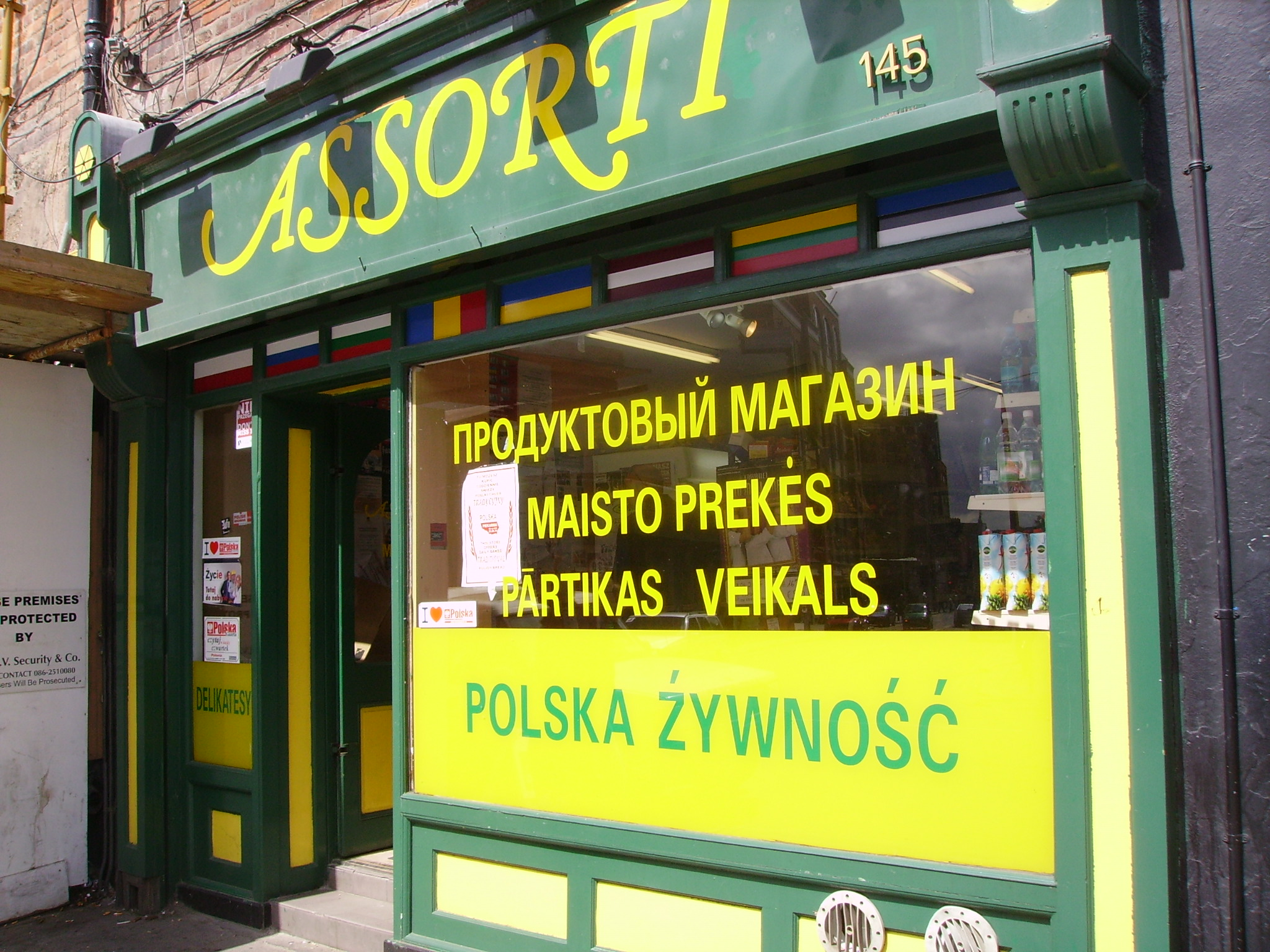
A Polish shop in Dublin

The Polish minority in Ireland is an ethnic, linguistic, cultural and national minority in the Republic of Ireland. While Poles have lived in Ireland for years, the population rose sharply after Poland's accession to the European Union. Polish citizens in Ireland numbered 93,680 (plus 17,152 people with dual Polish and Irish citizenship), according to 2022 census figures.

== History ==
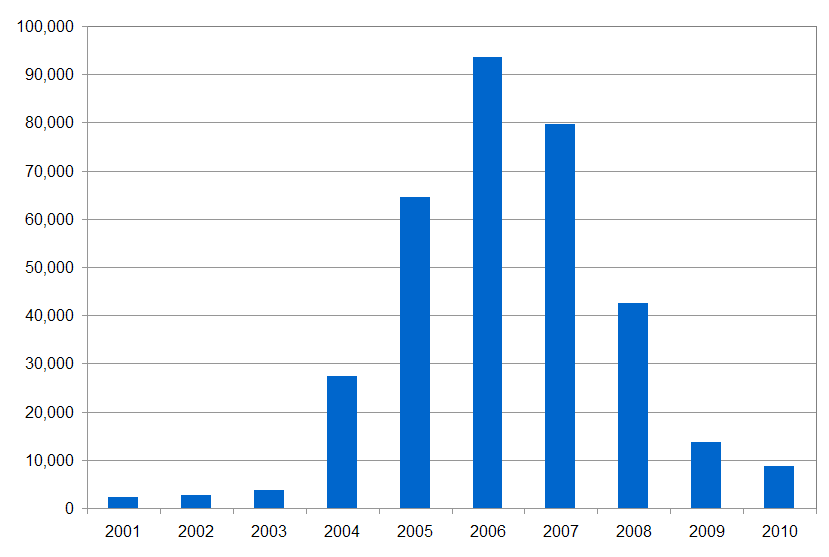
Chart tracking the number of Polish applicants for Irish PPS numbers between 2001 and 2010

After Poland joined the European Union in 2004, Ireland was one of three existing EU members to open its borders to Polish workers (the others being the United Kingdom and Sweden). Ireland quickly became a key destination for Poles wishing to work outside the country; in 2004 a website advertising Irish jobs in Polish received over 170,000 views on its first day.

In the period immediately following the 2008 economic downturn, the number of Polish people in Ireland declined, with some reports suggesting that 30,000 were leaving Ireland per year, and the Central Statistics Office reporting a decrease in the number of Polish people applying for PPS numbers.

Polish people living in Ireland can vote in Polish elections. On Election Day there are special ballot stations provided in Belfast, Cork, and Limerick as well as in the country's embassy in Dublin. Consequently, Polish political parties campaign in Ireland for electoral support.

Polish citizens, as with all other foreigners resident in Ireland, can vote and run as candidates in local Irish elections, even when they do not have Irish citizenship. Nine Polish candidates ran in the municipal election of 2009, nine in 2014, and three in 2019. None managed to win a mandate.

== Language and media ==
As of 2021, Polish is officially an established Senior Cycle subject in post-primary education and hence can be taken as part of the Irish Leaving Certificate examination.

The 2022 census of Ireland found that 123,968 people in Ireland identified as Polish speakers: 63% of these were Polish citizens and 35% were Irish citizens.

The biggest Polish umbrella organization is the Polish Educational Society in Ireland (PESI), a non-profit organisation established in 2012. PESI sponsors Polish supplementary schools in Ireland and widely cooperates with Polish government bodies and organisations working for the maintenance and promotion of the Polish language abroad.

The large number of Poles in Ireland led to the provision of a number of media outlets catering to them. Newspapers: Polska Gazeta and a section in Dublin's Evening Herald entitled "Polski Herald". Dublin cable television channel, City Channel, featured a programme aimed at Poles in Ireland entitled Oto Polska (This is Poland) until the channel closed in 2011.

For online media in Ireland see External links below.

== Population Distribution ==
The following table shows the distribution of Polish citizens across the Republic Ireland over three different censuses.

Distribution of Polish Citizens Across Ireland, 2011 - 2022
Local Authority	2011	2016	2022	
State	122585	122515	93680	Polish Chaplaincy in Ireland at St Audoen's Church, Dublin 2. Embassy of Poland public office on Eden Quay, Dublin 1. A Polish shop in Dublin, Ireland
Carlow	2275	2275	1875	Polish Chaplaincy in Ireland at St Audoen's Church, Dublin 2. Embassy of Poland public office on Eden Quay, Dublin 1. A Polish shop in Dublin, Ireland
Dublin City	13406	10704	7215	Polish Chaplaincy in Ireland at St Audoen's Church, Dublin 2. Embassy of Poland public office on Eden Quay, Dublin 1. A Polish shop in Dublin, Ireland
Dún Laoghaire-Rathdown	3541	3143	2088	Polish Chaplaincy in Ireland at St Audoen's Church, Dublin 2. Embassy of Poland public office on Eden Quay, Dublin 1. A Polish shop in Dublin, Ireland
Fingal	10604	11419	7881	Polish Chaplaincy in Ireland at St Audoen's Church, Dublin 2. Embassy of Poland public office on Eden Quay, Dublin 1. A Polish shop in Dublin, Ireland
South Dublin	8327	8485	5739	Polish Chaplaincy in Ireland at St Audoen's Church, Dublin 2. Embassy of Poland public office on Eden Quay, Dublin 1. A Polish shop in Dublin, Ireland
Kildare	7192	7205	5586	Polish Chaplaincy in Ireland at St Audoen's Church, Dublin 2. Embassy of Poland public office on Eden Quay, Dublin 1. A Polish shop in Dublin, Ireland
Kilkenny	2177	2310	1566	Polish Chaplaincy in Ireland at St Audoen's Church, Dublin 2. Embassy of Poland public office on Eden Quay, Dublin 1. A Polish shop in Dublin, Ireland
Laois	2300	2728	2298	Polish Chaplaincy in Ireland at St Audoen's Church, Dublin 2. Embassy of Poland public office on Eden Quay, Dublin 1. A Polish shop in Dublin, Ireland
Longford	1631	1907	1508	Polish Chaplaincy in Ireland at St Audoen's Church, Dublin 2. Embassy of Poland public office on Eden Quay, Dublin 1. A Polish shop in Dublin, Ireland
Louth	1875	2107	1734	Polish Chaplaincy in Ireland at St Audoen's Church, Dublin 2. Embassy of Poland public office on Eden Quay, Dublin 1. A Polish shop in Dublin, Ireland
Meath	3876	4470	3942	Polish Chaplaincy in Ireland at St Audoen's Church, Dublin 2. Embassy of Poland public office on Eden Quay, Dublin 1. A Polish shop in Dublin, Ireland
Offaly	1871	1931	1560	Polish Chaplaincy in Ireland at St Audoen's Church, Dublin 2. Embassy of Poland public office on Eden Quay, Dublin 1. A Polish shop in Dublin, Ireland
Westmeath	2357	2331	1832	Polish Chaplaincy in Ireland at St Audoen's Church, Dublin 2. Embassy of Poland public office on Eden Quay, Dublin 1. A Polish shop in Dublin, Ireland
Wexford	4015	3996	3356	Polish Chaplaincy in Ireland at St Audoen's Church, Dublin 2. Embassy of Poland public office on Eden Quay, Dublin 1. A Polish shop in Dublin, Ireland
Wicklow	2751	2905	2244	Polish Chaplaincy in Ireland at St Audoen's Church, Dublin 2. Embassy of Poland public office on Eden Quay, Dublin 1. A Polish shop in Dublin, Ireland
Clare	2660	2852	2462	Polish Chaplaincy in Ireland at St Audoen's Church, Dublin 2. Embassy of Poland public office on Eden Quay, Dublin 1. A Polish shop in Dublin, Ireland
Cork City and Cork County	15915	16276	13007	Polish Chaplaincy in Ireland at St Audoen's Church, Dublin 2. Embassy of Poland public office on Eden Quay, Dublin 1. A Polish shop in Dublin, Ireland
Kerry	4045	4234	3362	Polish Chaplaincy in Ireland at St Audoen's Church, Dublin 2. Embassy of Poland public office on Eden Quay, Dublin 1. A Polish shop in Dublin, Ireland
Limerick City and County	6088	5636	4384	Polish Chaplaincy in Ireland at St Audoen's Church, Dublin 2. Embassy of Poland public office on Eden Quay, Dublin 1. A Polish shop in Dublin, Ireland
Tipperary	4205	4071	3255	Polish Chaplaincy in Ireland at St Audoen's Church, Dublin 2. Embassy of Poland public office on Eden Quay, Dublin 1. A Polish shop in Dublin, Ireland
Waterford City and County	2250	2330	2058	Polish Chaplaincy in Ireland at St Audoen's Church, Dublin 2. Embassy of Poland public office on Eden Quay, Dublin 1. A Polish shop in Dublin, Ireland
Galway City	4099	3872	2597	Polish Chaplaincy in Ireland at St Audoen's Church, Dublin 2. Embassy of Poland public office on Eden Quay, Dublin 1. A Polish shop in Dublin, Ireland
Galway County	3434	3631	2914	Polish Chaplaincy in Ireland at St Audoen's Church, Dublin 2. Embassy of Poland public office on Eden Quay, Dublin 1. A Polish shop in Dublin, Ireland
Leitrim	763	831	698	Polish Chaplaincy in Ireland at St Audoen's Church, Dublin 2. Embassy of Poland public office on Eden Quay, Dublin 1. A Polish shop in Dublin, Ireland
Mayo	2934	2802	2131	Polish Chaplaincy in Ireland at St Audoen's Church, Dublin 2. Embassy of Poland public office on Eden Quay, Dublin 1. A Polish shop in Dublin, Ireland
Roscommon	1360	1367	1227	Polish Chaplaincy in Ireland at St Audoen's Church, Dublin 2. Embassy of Poland public office on Eden Quay, Dublin 1. A Polish shop in Dublin, Ireland
Sligo	1557	1521	1124	Polish Chaplaincy in Ireland at St Audoen's Church, Dublin 2. Embassy of Poland public office on Eden Quay, Dublin 1. A Polish shop in Dublin, Ireland
Cavan	1888	2190	1719	Polish Chaplaincy in Ireland at St Audoen's Church, Dublin 2. Embassy of Poland public office on Eden Quay, Dublin 1. A Polish shop in Dublin, Ireland
Donegal	2104	2003	1609	Polish Chaplaincy in Ireland at St Audoen's Church, Dublin 2. Embassy of Poland public office on Eden Quay, Dublin 1. A Polish shop in Dublin, Ireland
Monaghan	1085	983	709	Polish Chaplaincy in Ireland at St Audoen's Church, Dublin 2. Embassy of Poland public office on Eden Quay, Dublin 1. A Polish shop in Dublin, Ireland

== Notable people ==
- Stan Gebler Davies, journalist
- Paddy Ruschitzko, hurler

== See also ==
- Ireland–Poland relations
- Polish diaspora
- Soupy Norman
- Poles in the United Kingdom
