= Albania–Ireland relations =

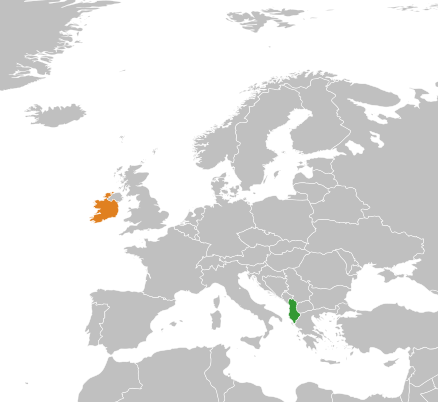

- Albania: Ireland

Albania and the Republic of Ireland have officially established diplomatic relations since 1995. Neither country has a resident ambassador. Ireland has a non resident ambassador based in Athens. Albania has a non resident ambassador in London. Both countries are members of the European Council of Foreign Relations, the Union for the Mediterranean and Organization for Security and Co-operation in Europe. Ireland fully supports Albania's accession process to the EU.

== History ==
The delegations from both countries have met after the end of the World War II in 1945 to seek establishing diplomatic relations with each other, and at this meeting an aid was made from the Government of Ireland for the countries of the Balkans during that time, due to the poor conditions of the Balkan countries after the end of the World War II. The diplomatic relations between Albania and Ireland are covered at the Albanian Embassy in the United Kingdom, while the diplomatic relations between Ireland and Albania are covered at the Irish Embassy in Greece. Ireland is seeking to open some diplomatic missions on the Western Balkans, due to its increase of the diplomatic missions around the world and its support of the European Union Enlargement agenda.

== High level visits ==
In February 2019, Irish Minister of State for European Affairs Helen McEntee visited Albania.

== Economic relations ==
Trade is relatively low. In 2022, Ireland exported US$12.2M to Albania and Albania exported US$3.13M to Ireland.

== See also ==
- Foreign relations of Albania
- Foreign relations of Ireland
- Ireland-NATO relations
- Accession of Albania to the EU
- NATO-EU relations
- Open Balkan
