= Ayla Peksoylu =

Ayla Peksoylu also known as ANGEL-I' is half Irish half Turkish Cypriot UK-born singer, songwriter, actress and professional model. Coming from an established musically backgrounded family, she began modelling/acting at around age 4 and has worked with, for and amongst actors and artists such as the Scottish actor Ewan McGregor – AEON commercial, Jeremy Healy – Peakin' music video, Texas – 'Inner smile' music video. She has also featured for brands such as Sony, Nike, Motorola and KFC.

Her singing career has taken her to many countries and she has worked with Turkish mega star Ajda Pekkan on the Gülen Paint Tour, Işın Karaca at a special mini concert night, Nükhet Duru on various occasions and the legendary Istanbul Gelisim Orchestra (Garo Mafyan, Atilla Özdemiroğlu, Ugur Başar. Ayla Peksoylu competed in the CYBC 'Performance' TV show in 2010 to be the first Turkish Cypriot to represent Cyprus in the Eurovision Song Contest 2011. Judged by a 4-person jury she received 39/40 which counted for 60% of the final vote. but did not win due to the public votes which counted for 40% of the total.

She has trained at many schools including The Anna Scher School of Acting, Dame Judi Dench's Mountview Academy of Theatre Arts and dance at the Italia Conti Academy of Theatre Arts.
