= Turks in Ireland =

Ethnic group in Ireland

İrlanda Türkleri

Total population
- Several thousand est. 2,000-3,000 (2007 estimate)

Regions with significant populations
- Cork, Dublin, Limerick

Languages
- Turkish, English

Religion
- Predominantly Sunni Islam; Minority Alevism, other religions, or irreligious

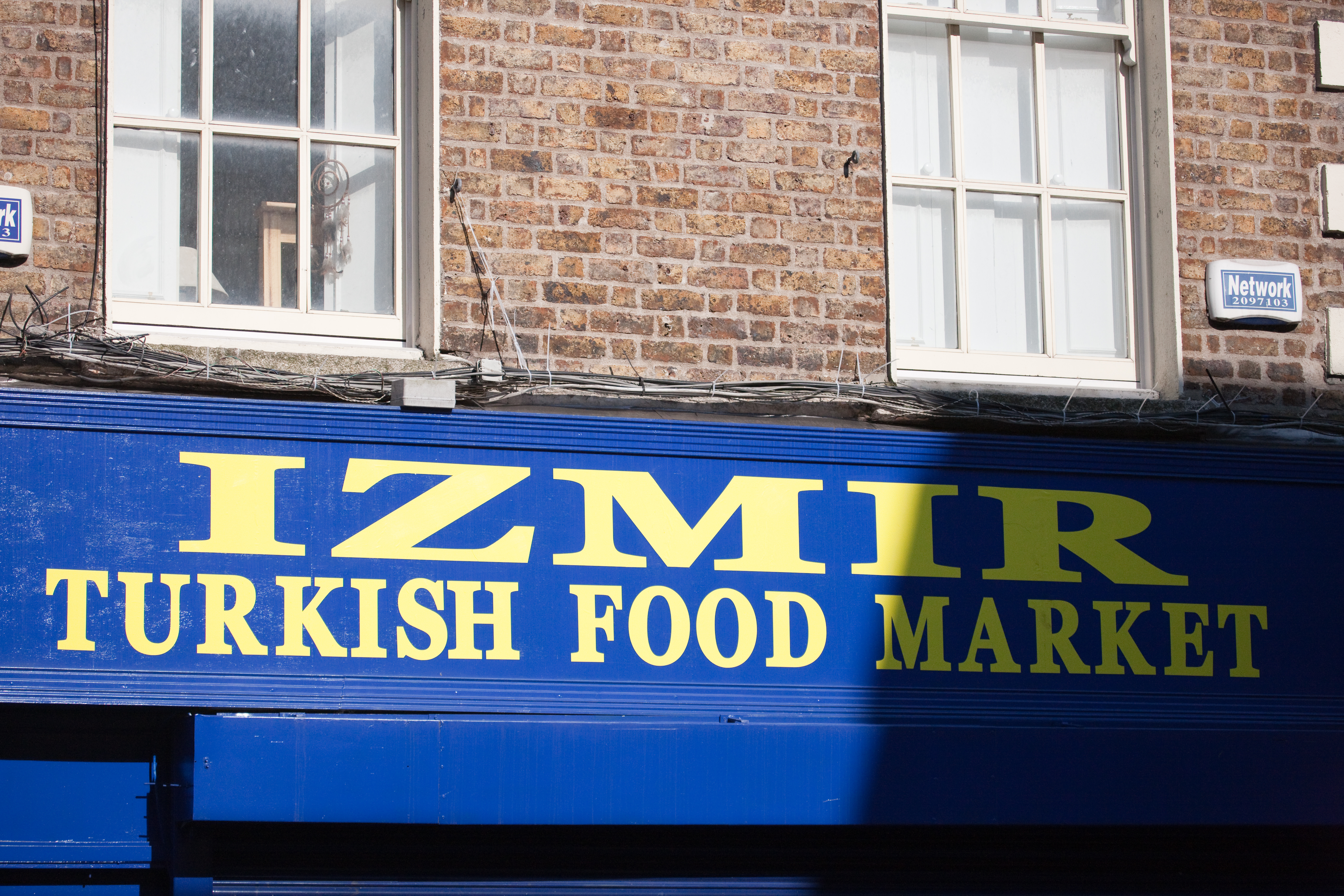
A Turkish food market in Capel Street, Dublin.

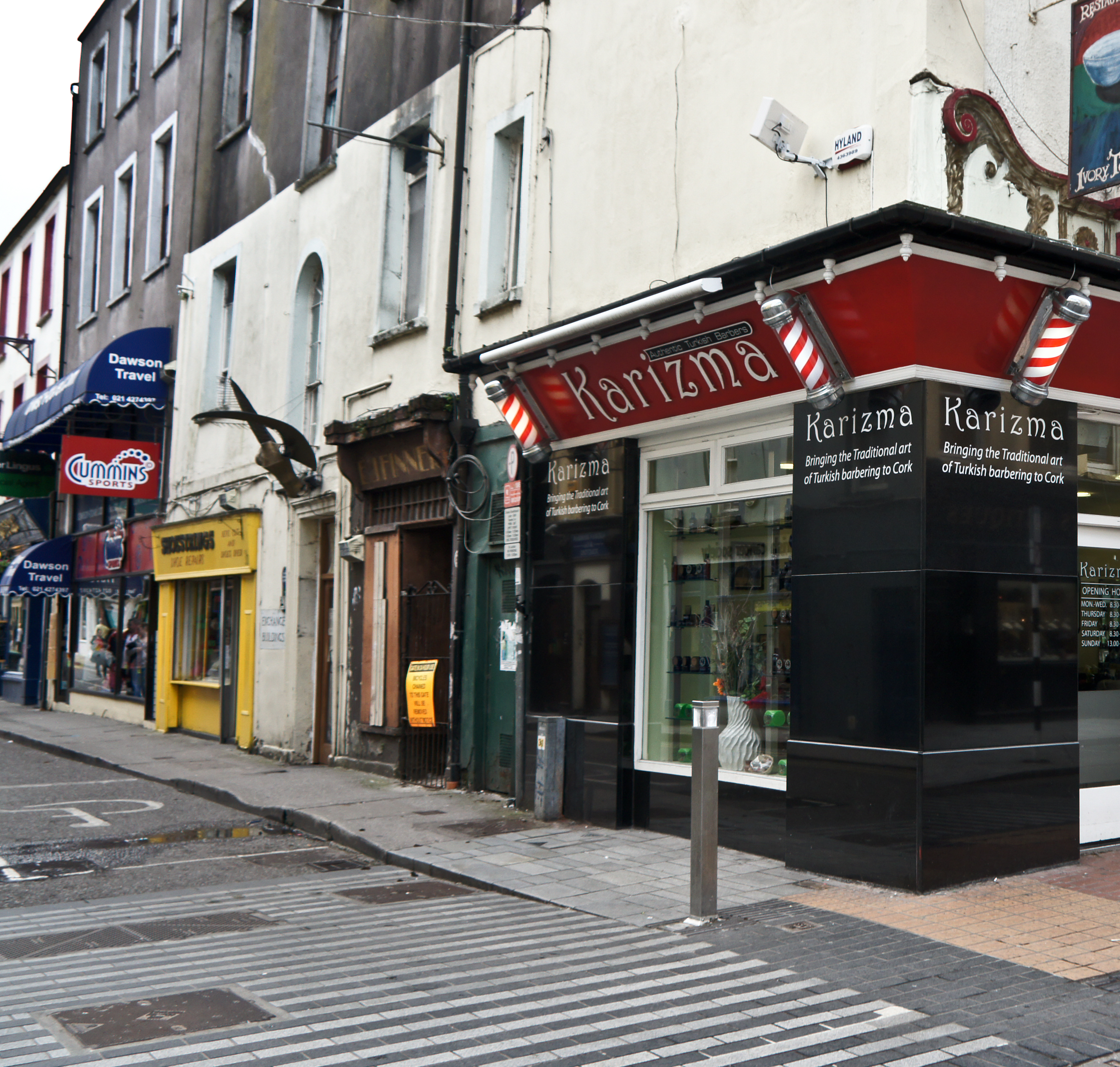
A Turkish barber shop in Cork.

Turks in Ireland (Turkish: İrlanda Türkleri, Irish: Turcaigh in Éirinn) are Turkish people who live in Ireland having been born elsewhere or are Irish-born but have Turkish roots. By Turkish roots, this could mean roots linking back to Turkey, the island of Cyprus, or the communities of the Turkish diaspora.

== History ==
Iberian descendants of people from Anatolia (ancient Turkey) arrived in Ireland during the Neolithic period about 6,000–7,000 years ago. These early people introduced farming to the island.

== Population ==
According to the 2016 Irish census, there were 1,043 Turkish nationals living in Ireland.

During a strike in 2005 against the GAMA Turkish Construction Company, socialist news websites reported that they alone employed 900 to 2,000 Turkish workers.

The Turkish embassy may have an investment in downplaying the number of Turks in Ireland given the negative reception of Turks in other European countries, such as German Turks, Dutch Turks, and French-Turks. Thus, the number of Turkish descendants living in Ireland in 2007 was estimated by Turkish immigrants themselves to be 2,000–3,000, according to sociologist Jonathan Lacey of Trinity College Dublin.

According to information from the Turkish Foreign Ministry in 2019, there were 4,500 Turkish citizens living in Ireland.

== Organisations and associations ==
- The Irish Turkish Business Association aims to promote the development of bilateral trade between Ireland and Turkey.
- The Turkish Association of Ireland aims to bring the Turkish community in Ireland together.
- The Turkish Irish Educational and Cultural Society (TIECS) aims to strengthen and advance the ties between the Turkish and Irish community.
- Democratic Türkiye Community in Ireland is a group which began protesting against political events in Turkey in March 2025.

== Notable people ==
- Ahmet Dede, celebrity chef (Turkish origin)
- Abs Breen, singer (Turkish father)
- Billy Mehmet, football player (Turkish Cypriot father)
- Joseph O'Neill, author (Turkish mother)
- Ayla Peksoylu, singer (Turkish Cypriot father)

== See also ==
- Ireland–Turkey relations
- Turks in Europe
  - Turks in the United Kingdom

== Bibliography ==
- Barry, Mick (2006), We are workers not slaves: the story of the GAMA struggle, Dublin: Socialist Party of Ireland, OCLC 71284523
- Dewhurst, Elaine (2009), "Access to justice and the impact of delay on migrant workers in Ireland" (PDF), Cork Online Law Review, 8, University College Cork Law Society
- Lacey, Jonathan (2007), "Exploring the Transnational Engagements of a Turkic Religio-Cultural Community in Ireland" (PDF), Translocations: The Irish Migration, Race and Social Transformation Review, 1 (2), archived from the original (PDF) on 21 July 2011
