= Iceland–Ireland relations =

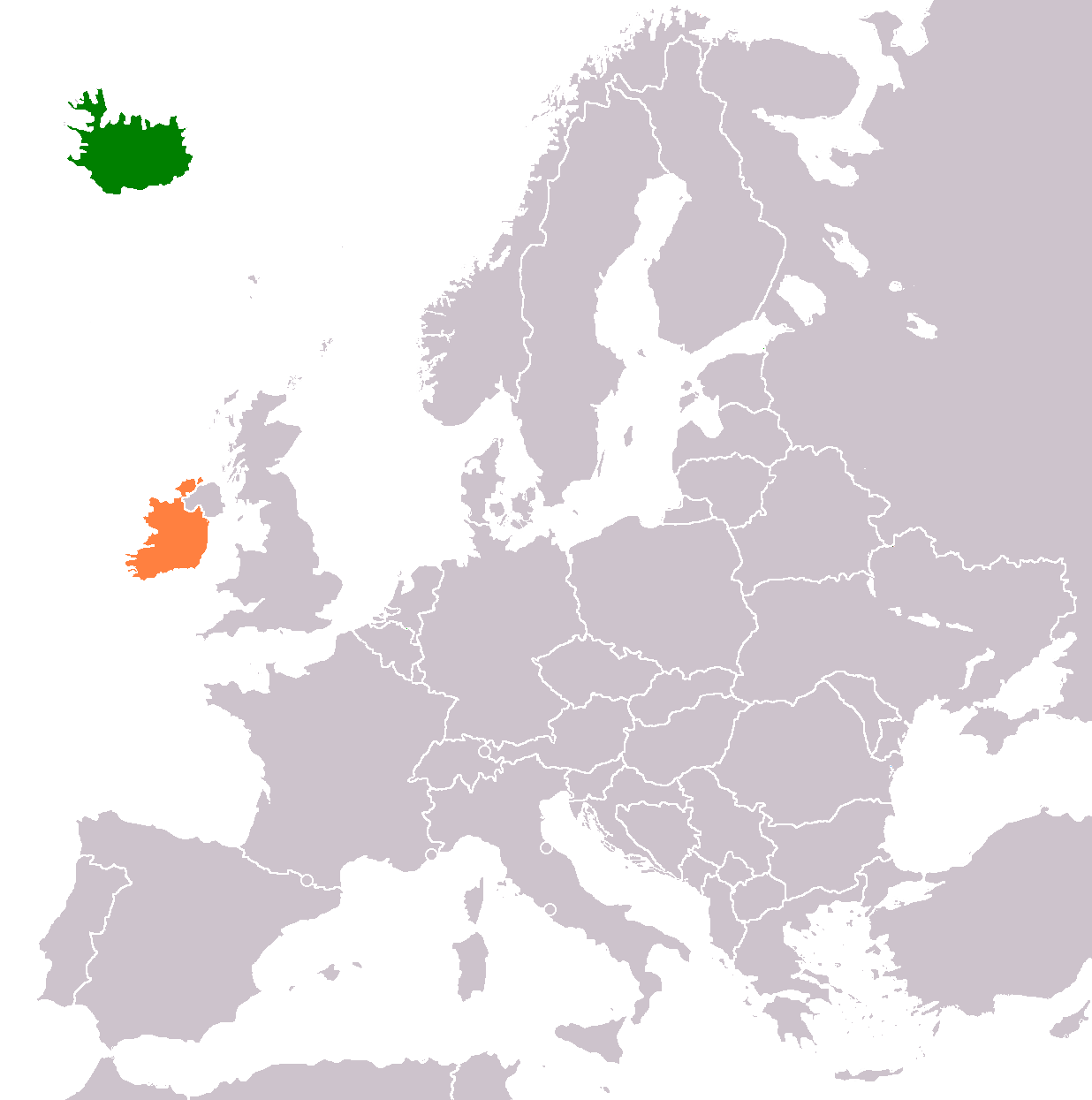

- Iceland: Ireland

Iceland–Ireland relations are the bilateral relations between Iceland and Ireland. Both nations are members of the European Economic Area, Organisation for Economic Co-operation and Development and the Organization for Security and Co-operation in Europe.

== History ==
Connections between Iceland and Ireland began circa 700s or 800s when Irish monks first explored Iceland as mentioned in the books by Irish monk and geographer Dicuil. When Norse explorers arrived to Iceland, many encountered the Irish monks on the island who they called "Papar" for the religious books they would leave behind on the island. When Norse settlers arrived, many of the Irish monks left Iceland because they would not inhabit a country of "pagans". During the following centuries, more Norse explorers would come to Iceland and bring with them Irish women who were slaves to Iceland producing Iceland's current genetic make-up among its population.

During World War II, both Iceland (in personal union with the Kingdom of Denmark) and Ireland remained neutral. Iceland became a republic in June 1944. On 11 March 1948, both Iceland and Ireland established diplomatic relations. In 1960, Iceland joined the European Free Trade Association while Ireland joined the European Union in 1973. In 2003, both nations signed a double taxation agreement. After the 2008 financial crisis that affected heavily the two nations, Iceland began the formal application process to join the EU; however, Ireland raised concerns over Iceland's over fishing of the mackerel which Ireland stated that Iceland fished more than its share of the fish. In 2013, Iceland pulled its application for joining the EU, wishing instead to remain outside the union.

== Transport ==
Both nations are served with direct flights provided by Icelandair.

== State visits ==
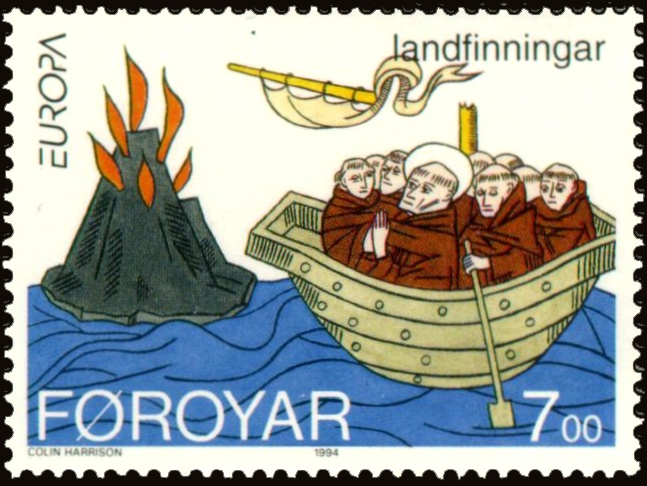
Stamp commemorating Irish monks arriving in Iceland

Presidential and Prime Ministerial visits from Iceland to Ireland

- President Vigdís Finnbogadóttir (1991)
- Prime Minister Geir Haarde (2007)

Presidential and Prime Ministerial (Taoiseach) visits from Ireland to Iceland

- President Mary Robinson (1991, 1996)
- Taoiseach Bertie Ahern (2001)

== Trade ==
Both Iceland and Ireland trade under the European Single Market with Iceland belonging to the EFTA and Ireland being a full member of the EU. In 2015, total trade between Iceland the European Union (which includes Ireland) totaled €5.7 billion.

== Diplomatic missions ==
- Iceland is accredited to Ireland from its embassy in London, United Kingdom.
- Ireland is accredited to Iceland from its embassy in Copenhagen, Denmark.

== See also ==
- Foreign relations of Iceland
- Foreign relations of Ireland
- Iceland-EU relations
- Ireland-NATO relations
- NATO-EU relations
- Brendan the Navigator
