= List of Irish ambassadors =

This is a list of Ambassadors born in or representing Ireland.

An ambassador is an official envoy, especially a highest ranking diplomat who represents a state and is usually accredited to state, or to an international organization as the representative of their own government or sovereign or appointed for a special and often temporary diplomatic assignment

== Ambassadors ==
- Anne Anderson
- Anne Barrington
- Ray Bassett
- Frederick Boland
- Niall Burgess
- Geraldine Byrne Nason
- Charles Bewley
- Daniel Binchy
- William Carlos (Philippines)
- Frances Collins
- Michael Collins
- David J. Cooney
- Gerard Corr
- Con Cremin
- Bernard Davenport
- Denis Devlin
- David Donoghue
- Noel Dorr
- John Whelan Dulanty
- Sean Farrell
- William Fay
- Frank Flood
- Eimear Friel
- Derek Hannon
- Justin Harman
- Mahon Hayes
- John Hearne
- Timothy Joseph Horan (Spain, Sweden)
- Sean Hoy
- Valentin Iremonger
- Alison Kelly
- Declan Kelly
- Kevin Kelly
- Leopold H. Kerney
- Thomas Joseph Kiernan
- Seán Lester
- Emma Madigan
- Bob McDonagh
- Bobby McDonagh
- Philip McDonagh
- Brian McElduff
- Eamonn McKee
- Pádraig MacKernan
- Josephine McNeill
- Michael MacWhite
- Daniel Mulhall
- Pádraig Murphy
- John Neary (diplomat)
- Bill Nolan (diplomat)
- Patricia O'Brien
- Dáithí O'Ceallaigh
- Colm Ó Floinn
- Orla O'Hanrahan
- Aidan O'Hara
- James O'Mara
- Breffni O’Reilly (Switzerland)
- Sean G. Ronan
- Richard Ryan
- James A. Sharkey
- Geraldine Skinner
- Joseph Small
- Mary Catherine Tinney (Sweden, Belgium, Kenya)
- Dermot Waldron (Italy, Denmark, Sweden, China)
- Joseph Walshe
- Patrick Walsh
- Brendan Ward
- Mary Whelan
- Colin Wrafter

== See also ==
- Lists of ambassadors
