= Hilary Reilly =

Irish diplomat

Her Excellency Hilary Reilly

7th Ambassador of Ireland to Malaysia
- Incumbent
- Assumed office 2 October 2019
- President: Michael D. Higgins
- Prime Minister: Leo Varadkar
- Preceded by: Eamon Hickey

Personal details
- Citizenship: Irish
- Occupation: Diplomat

Hilary Reilly is an Irish diplomat who is currently serving as the Ambassador of Ireland to Malaysia.

== Diplomatic career ==
Reilly's recommendation to succeed Eamon Hickey as Ambassador of Ireland to Malaysia was approved by the Government of Ireland on the 26 June 2019. She subsequently presented her diplomatic accreditation to the Yang di-Pertuan Agong (Head of state and King of Malaysia) on 2 October 2019.

Prior to her appointment as an ambassador, Reilly served as deputy head of mission at the Embassy of Ireland in Ottawa, Canada. In 2015, she was next posted to the Irish Embassy in Washington, D.C. as the political counsellor for EU & International Affairs, coincidentally serving under former Irish Ambassador to Malaysia and current Ambassador of Ireland to the United States, Daniel Mulhall.

Diplomatic posts
Preceded by Eamon Hickey	Ambassador of Ireland to Malaysia; 2019–present	Incumbent
