= List of ambassadors of Ireland to Canada =

Ambassador of Ireland to Canada
- Coat of Arms of Ireland
- Incumbent; John Concannon since November 14, 2023
- Style: His Excellency
- Inaugural holder: John Hearne (High Commissioner); Seán Murphy (Ambassador)
- Formation: 1939 (High Commissioner); 1950 (Ambassador)
- Website: Embassy of Ireland, Ottawa

The Ambassador of Ireland to Canada is the head of the Embassy of Ireland, Ottawa, and the official representative of the Government of Ireland to the Government of Canada.

The incumbent Ambassador is John Concannon who was appointed on 14 October .

== History ==
In 1929, the Irish Free State planned to open a diplomatic mission in Ottawa, but these plans were later shelved.

In 1939, Canada and Ireland opened High Commissions in each other's capital cities. The first and only High Commissioner of Ireland to the Dominion of Canada was John Hearne.

In 1949, the Republic of Ireland Act 1948 came into force and Ireland became a republic, leaving the Commonwealth. In 1950, Ireland appointed its first Ambassador of Ireland to Canada, Seán Murphy, as the High Commission was also converted into an embassy.

== List of representatives ==
=== High Commissioner from Ireland to Canada (1939-1949) ===
- 1939–1949: John Hearne

=== Ambassadors from Ireland to Canada (1950–present) ===
- 1950–1955: Seán Murphy
- 1955–1956: Leo McCauley
- 1956–1960: Thomas Kiernan
- 1960–1964: William Fay
- 1964–1967: John Aloysius Belton
- 1967–1970: William Warnock
- 1970–1973: Joseph Shields
- 1974–1978: Paddy Power
- 1978–1983: Sean Kennan
- 1983–1988: Sean Gaynor
- 1988–1991: Edward Brennan
- 1991–1995: Antóin MacUnfraidh
- 1995–2001: Paul Dempsey
- 2001–2006: Martin Burke
- 2006–2010: Declan Kelly
- 2010–2016: Ray Bassett
- 2016–2020: Jim Kelly
- 2020-2024: Eamonn McKee
- 2024- : John Concannon

== See also ==
- Canada-Ireland relations
