= List of ambassadors of Ireland to Spain =

Coordinates: 40.434218°N 3.687887°W

Ambassador of Ireland to the Kingdom of Spain
- Coat of Arms of Ireland
- Incumbent; Síle Maguire since September 2017
- Style: Her Excellency
- Inaugural holder: Leopold H. Kerney (Envoy Extraordinary and Minister Plenipotentiary); Leo McCauley (Ambassador)
- Formation: 1935 (Envoy); 1949 (Ambassador)
- Website: Embassy of Ireland, Spain

The Ambassador of Ireland to Spain is the head of the Embassy of Ireland, Madrid, and the official representative of the Government of Ireland to the Government of Spain. The official title is Ambassador of Ireland to the Kingdom of Spain.

The incumbent Ambassador is Frank Smyth, who was appointed in 2021.

== History ==
Leopold H. Kerney was the first Envoy Extraordinary and Minister Plenipotentiary and was appointed in September 1935. Kerney presented his credentials to the President of the Spanish Republic, Niceto Alcalá Zamora. The legation of the Irish Free State in Madrid was closed temporarily because of the Spanish Civil War. Kerney sought refuge in St Jean de Luz, on the French border with Spain.

In October 1950, the first Ambassador of Ireland was appointed following Ireland's departure from the Commonwealth.

== List of representatives ==
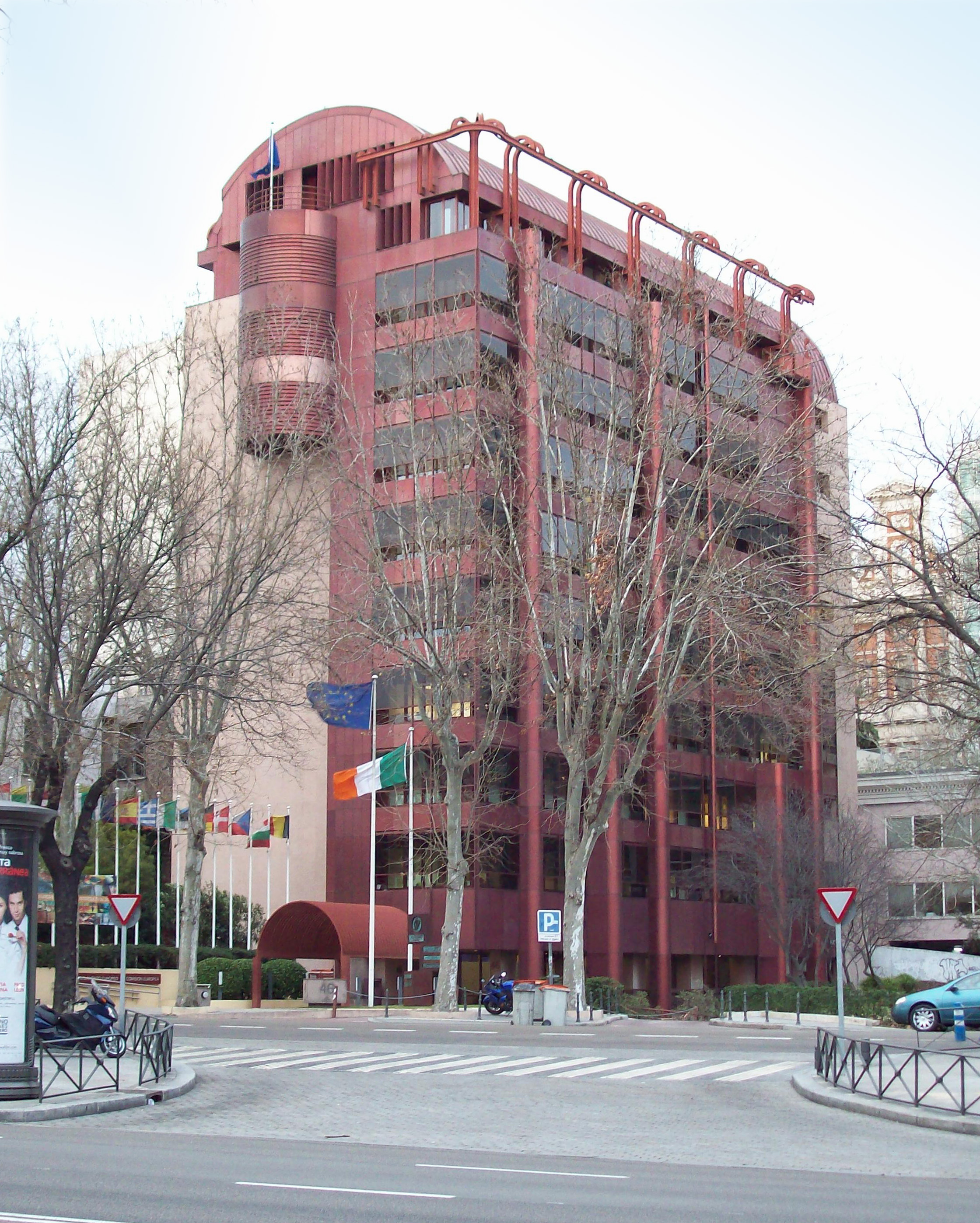
The Irish Embassy in Madrid

Designated/Diplomatic accreditation	Ambassador	Observations	Taoiseach	List of prime ministers of Spain	Term end
1935	Leopold H. Kerney		Éamon de Valera	Niceto Alcalá Zamora	1946
1946	John Aloysius Belton		Éamon de Valera	Francisco Franco	1949
1949	Leo McCauley		John A. Costello	Francisco Franco	1955
1955	Michael Andrew Lysaght Rynne	(1899-1981)	John A. Costello	Francisco Franco	1962
1962	Timothy Joseph Horan		Seán Lemass	Francisco Franco	1967
1967	James Wilfrid Lennon		Jack Lynch	Francisco Franco	1970
1970	Brian Gallagher (Irish diplomat)		Jack Lynch	Francisco Franco	1974
1974	Charles Whelan (Irish diplomat)		Liam Cosgrave	Carlos Arias Navarro	1978
1978	Denis Holmes		Jack Lynch	Adolfo Suárez	1983
1983	Gearóid O Clérigh		Charles Haughey	Felipe González	1988
1988	Patrick Walshe (Irish diplomat)		Charles Haughey	Felipe González	1994
1994	Richard Ryan (diplomat)		John Bruton	Felipe González	1998
1998	Pádraig Murphy		Bertie Ahern	José María Aznar	2001
2001	Declan O'Donovan		Bertie Ahern	José María Aznar	2005
2005	Peter Gunning (Irish diplomat)		Bertie Ahern	José Luis Rodríguez Zapatero	2009
2009	Justin Harman		Brian Cowen	José Luis Rodríguez Zapatero	2014
2014	David J. Cooney		Enda Kenny	Mariano Rajoy	2017
2017	Síle Maguire		Leo Varadkar	Mariano Rajoy	2021
2021	Frank Smyth		Micheál Martin	Pedro Sánchez	Incumbent

== See also ==
- Ireland–Spain relations
