= Holy See–Ireland relations =

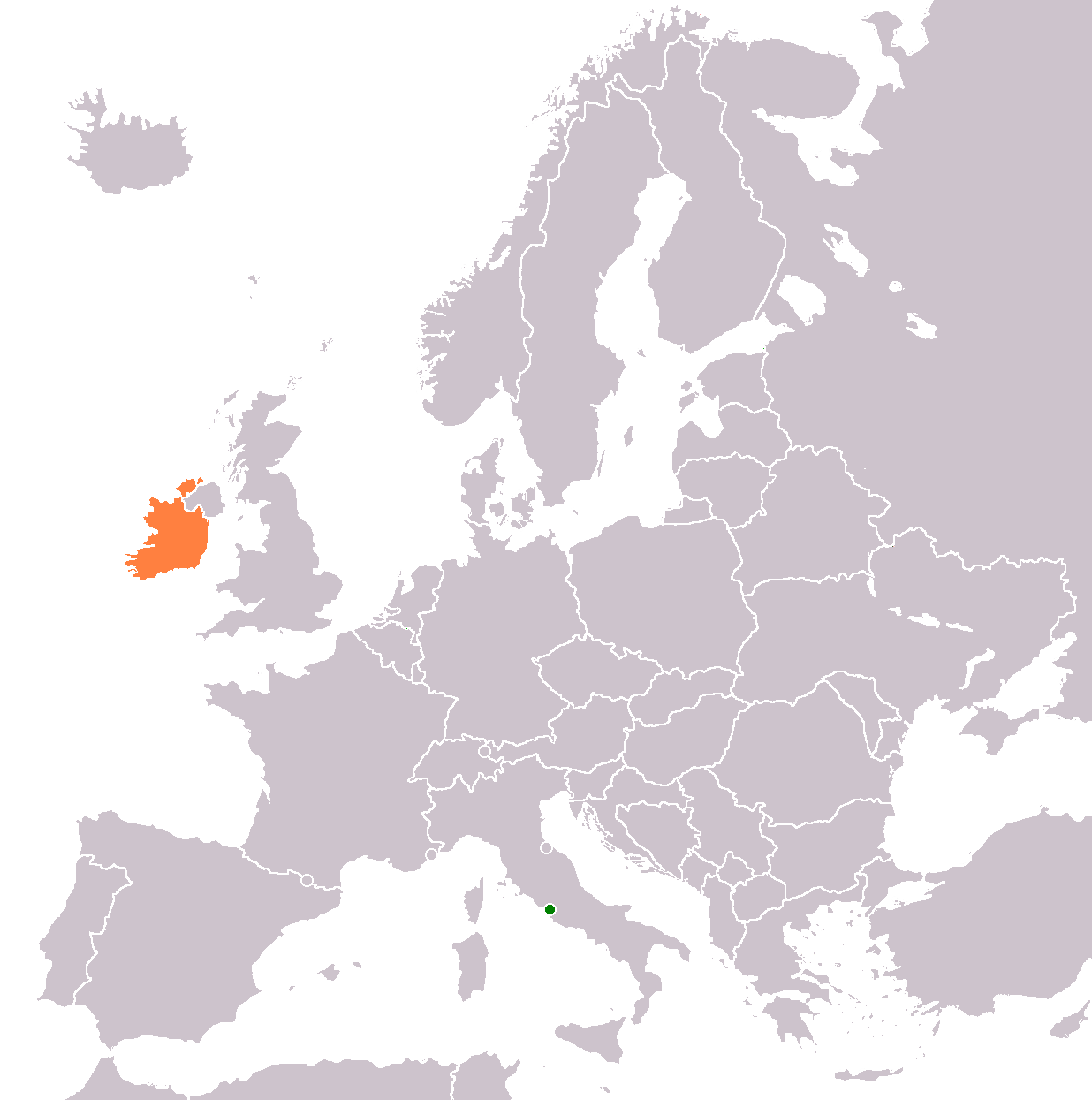

- Holy See: Ireland

Holy See–Ireland relations are foreign relations between the Holy See and Ireland. The majority of Irish people identify as Roman Catholic, according to census data. However, views on actual church dogma both on social and spiritual matters vary significantly, and weekly mass attendance is below 40%. The Holy See has an Apostolic Nunciature in Dublin.

Relations were strained in the 2000s after revelations of Catholic Church sexual abuse cases in Ireland.

== History ==
=== Ancient links ===
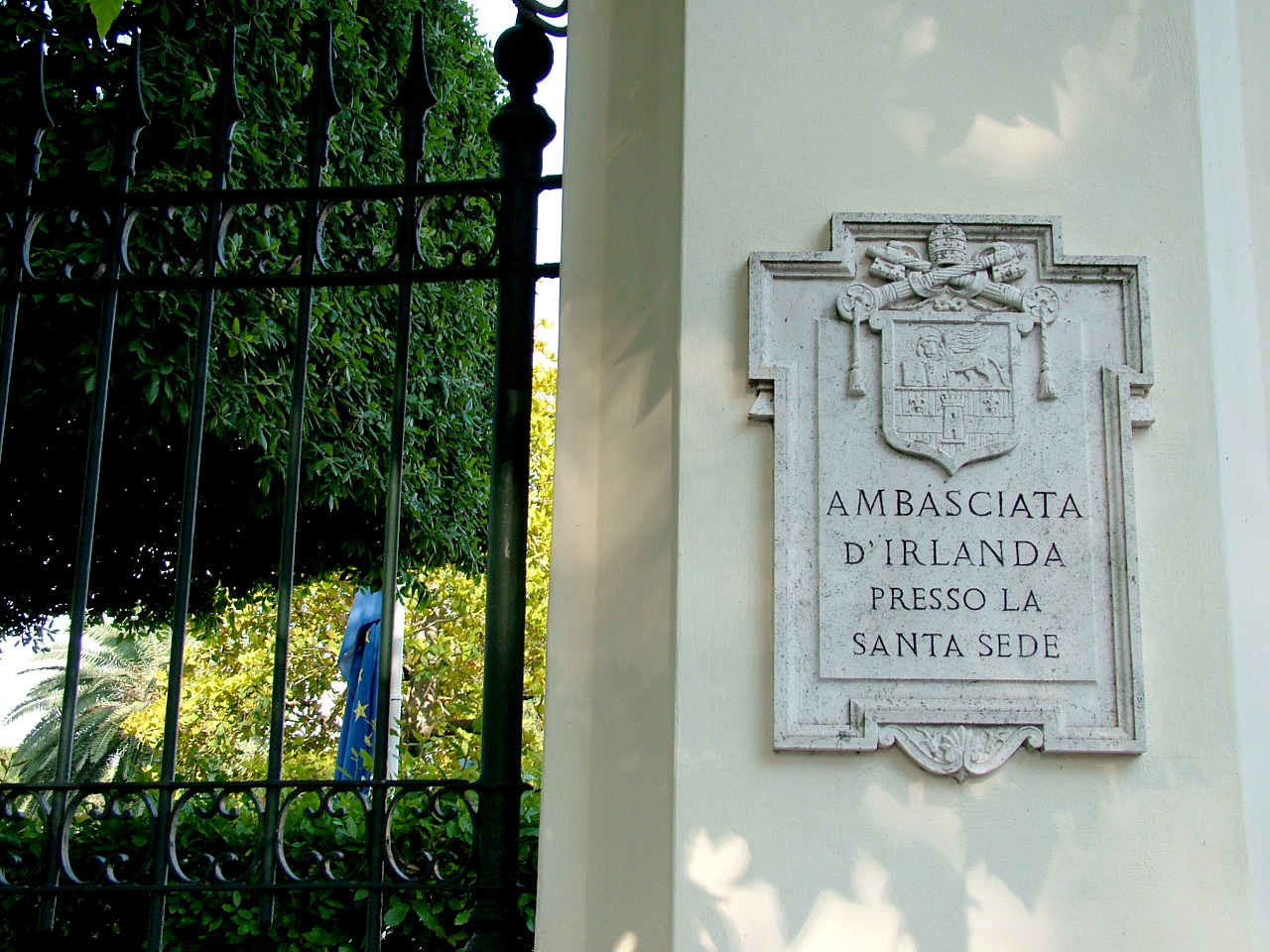
Embassy of Ireland to the Holy See, Rome

Ireland has had links with the Holy See since at least the time of Saint Patrick. Patrick being sent to Ireland by Pope Celestine I, a territory later regarded, by Rome, through an interpretation of the Donation of Constantine, as one of its Ecclesiastical fief. Relations between Ireland and the Holy See were intermittent, in the early medieval period, with a distinct and independent Celtic Christianity and church established, though Rome continued to appointment bishops, and papal legates were sent to preside over reforming synods, such as the Synod of Kells in 1152. Following the dispatch of Laudabiliter, and the subsequent Angevin invasion, and establishment of the reforming Lordship of Ireland, the Synod of Cashel (1172) was held to assert Roman authority, and align the local churches, with Roman custom, along with collect tithes and rent for Rome. The crown of the territory later formally gifted by Rome, in 1555, through Pope Paul IV's bull "Ilius, per quem Reges regnant", to Philip II of Spain and Mary I of England.

The Pontifical Irish College, the Roman Catholic seminary for the training and education of priests in Rome, was founded in 1628. Irish Catholics were the main promoters of Catholic emancipation that was achieved in 1829 in what was then the United Kingdom of Great Britain and Ireland. From 1850 the Irish Church followed Ultramontanism under Cardinal Cullen and it became a conservative element in the Irish nationalist movement.

=== Ireland ===
During the Irish War of Independence (1919–21) the Irish Republic hoped for recognition from the Holy See, which was not forthcoming. A memorandum from envoy Seán T. O'Kelly to Pope Benedict XV in May 1920 made the case for Vatican recognition of the Republic. The United Kingdom envoy at that time was the count de Salis, a Catholic landowner in County Limerick who was not a supporter of Irish nationalism. The Holy See withheld recognition until the war had ended with a treaty signed at the end of 1921 between the proposed Irish Free State and Britain, that allowed for international recognition of the new Irish state.

=== Irish Free State ===
During the 1922-23 Irish Civil War Irish prime minister W. T. Cosgrave asked the Holy See to recall its peace envoy, Monsignor Luzio, from "blundering around Ireland" and deplored that Luzio had met "with some of the persons in armed revolt against this Government and indeed against the social and moral order." His Minister for Foreign Affairs Desmond FitzGerald was sent to the Holy See to put forward the government's point of view and its opinion of Monsignor Luzio. In turn when Luzio returned to the Holy See he was reported to have said that when he came to Ireland to meet the 26 bishops in the country, he had instead "found 26 Popes". This was in part because the commencement of diplomatic relations after Ireland's War of Independence most Irish bishops felt that a nunciature would reduce their authority.

Following the 1929 Lateran Treaty between the Kingdom of Italy and the Holy See, other states including the Irish Free State exchanged envoys with the Holy See for the first time. Fianna Fáil deplored that the government had failed to consult the bishops about the diplomatic exchange. Éamon de Valera – together with a number of other senior clergymen – believed that the Holy See was pro-British and, therefore, opposed diplomatic relations with the Holy See. However, the first Nuncio, Paschal Robinson, who was appointed in January 1930, proved to be a popular choice with both the church and the state. Joseph Walshe became the first Irish ambassador to the Holy See in 1946. At the time, Giovanni Battista Montini, the future Pope Paul VI, told him that "you are the most Catholic country in the world." Walshe said that he believed Ireland's relationship with the Holy See was of "a very special character."

The relationship was cemented by the 1932 Eucharistic Congress in Dublin, and Irish diplomatic protocol treated the Papal Nuncio ex officio as the "Dean", or honorary senior member, of the diplomatic corps. In 1949 Ireland became a Republic. In 1951 the influence of the Church was so high that the then Taoiseach, John A. Costello, said that: "I am an Irishman second, I am a Catholic first, and I accept without qualification in all respects the teaching of the hierarchy and the church to which I belong."

During the 1970s the Holy See watched with concern developments in Northern Ireland, and on 19 December 1974, Pope Paul VI expressed his hope to the Irish Ambassador to the Vatican for a peaceful solution in that area, but without expressing any opinion as to whether it should be part of the Republic of Ireland or the United Kingdom.

At a luncheon in Iveagh House in September 1985, Minister for Foreign Affairs Peter Barry told Cardinal Secretary of State Agostino Casaroli that the relationship between church and state in Ireland hurt the two major parties. However, he said that bishops in Ireland had a right to put forward their positions, but the Irish state would legislate for the common good. Between 1973 and 1977, Liam Cosgrave's (son of W. T. Cosgrave) government had a rift with the Holy See over the actions of Nuncio Archbishop Gaetano Alibrandi in relation to Northern Ireland in which Cosgrave wrote a letter to the Holy See, and approved by Garret FitzGerald, which was read by Alibrandi as the "closest thing to a declaration of war." FitzGerald even asked for Alibrandi to be declared persona non-grata but Cosgrave would not agree to the proposal

In September 1979 Pope John Paul II made the first papal visit to Ireland. 39 years later, Pope Francis visited Ireland for the World Meeting of Families held in Dublin in 2018. Held every three years, the meeting is the world's largest Catholic gathering of families. Prior to the second reigning papal visit, Francis had spent time studying English in Dublin in 1980, as Fr Jorge Bergoglio.

=== Challenges ===
==== Child abuse ====
The 2009 Commission to Inquire into Child Abuse was one of a range of measures introduced by the Irish Government to investigate the extent and effects of the Catholic sexual abuse scandal in Ireland.

Following an electoral victory, the Fine Gael government led by Enda Kenny took stronger steps against the church in Ireland. Speaking to the Dáil following the release of the Cloyne Report, which showed that Irish clerics partook in a cover-up to conceal the extent of child sexual abuse after the Vatican questioned the child protection guidelines adopted by the Irish bishops, he said that "the historic relationship between church and state in Ireland could not be the same again. The rape and torture of children were downplayed or 'managed' to uphold instead the primacy of the institution, its power, standing and reputation." Mr Kenny said the Cloyne Report "exposed the dysfunction, disconnection, elitism and narcissism" in the Vatican." On 25 July 2011 the Apostolic Nuncio Archbishop Leanza was recalled to the Secretariat of State of the Holy See "for consultations" as a sign, among other things, of "surprise and disappointment at certain excessive reactions". Some confidential communications written by an American diplomat assigned to the Vatican were published as part of WikiLeaks, and revealed difficulties in the relationship between the Holy See and the Republic of Ireland during the investigation of sexual abuse in the Catholic Church.

When Ireland later closed its embassy to the Holy See, "the move was interpreted in Vatican diplomatic circles as a snub by Ireland" in response to its perception that the Holy See was trying to cover up and interfere in a report on clerical child abuse.

==== Same sex marriage ====
The Irish Marriage Equality referendum was held on 22 May 2015, and the measure passed easily in spite of opposition from the Holy See. With votes from all 43 constituencies counted, the 62.07% "yes" vote assured the passage of the referendum. The Vatican reaction to the news of Ireland's enthusiastic embrace of marriage equality was quick and negative. Cardinal Pietro Parolin, the Vatican's secretary of state, called the measure's passage a "defeat for humanity".

=== Non-residential status of ambassador and reopening ===
On 3 November 2011 the Irish Tániste and Minister of Foreign Affairs, Eamon Gilmore announced that Ireland would close its embassy in the Vatican, along with the embassy in Tehran and a representative office in East-Timor, and that the Irish ambassador to the Holy See would reside not in Rome but in Ireland.

Gilmore said the "decision follows a review of overseas missions carried out by the Department of Foreign Affairs and Trade which gave particular attention to the economic return from bilateral missions". "In order to meet its targets under the EU-IMF programme and to restore public expenditure to sustainable levels, the Government has been obliged to implement cuts across a wide range of public services. No area of Government expenditure can be immune from the need to implement savings." The decision was highly controversial and opposed by former diplomats including retired ambassador Seán Donlon. The argument that it could not be justified on financial grounds was also questioned. Some believe it is more related to Ireland's reaction to Vatican handling of sexual abuse cases in Ireland. Shortly after the release of the Cloyne report on Church handling of abuse and shortly before the closure of the embassy, Enda Kenny criticised the Vatican's approach to the sex abuse crisis in the Dáil: "Far from listening to evidence of humiliation and betrayal with St Benedict’s 'ear of the heart'... the Vatican’s reaction was to parse and analyse it with the gimlet eye of a canon lawyer".

The Minister was questioned several times in the Dáil about the status of Ireland's representation to the Holy See. On 17 April 2013, he replied "The Government decision in November 2011 to close our resident embassy to the Holy See was taken with considerable reluctance as part of a necessary budget process to reduce costs. The closure of the resident embassy to the Holy See has yielded substantial savings, not least as it enabled the significantly larger embassy to Italy and the residence of the ambassador to Italy to be relocated to the State-owned Villa Spada, formerly occupied by the embassy to the Holy See, thereby saving €445,000 per annum in rent on two properties. Ambassador Cooney travels to Rome regularly and was present for the inauguration of Pope Francis, to which he accompanied the President and the Minister for Finance who represented the Government and subsequently at the Pope’s meeting with the Diplomatic Corps. I am satisfied that the current arrangement for Ireland’s representation at the Holy See is the most effective possible in light of the resource constraints faced by my Department. The resident embassy to the Holy See will not be reopened in the immediate term. I will, however, be keeping the deployment of our diplomatic and consular resources under review in light of ongoing national priorities and the availability of resources."

In January 2014 it was announced that a residential ambassador would be reappointed. One senior Vatican figure said the reopening will mark "the end of a painful period" in Ireland's relations with the Holy See. The reopening of the embassy was announced by Eamon Gilmore as part of an expansion of Ireland's diplomatic network which will see Embassies opening in Thailand, Indonesia, Croatia, Kenya and the Holy See. Officials also stressed that there would be no possibility of the embassy being housed at its old site of Villa Spada which, in the meantime, has become the Irish Embassy to Italy. The Ministry claims the new Vatican Embassy will be a "modest", one-person operation.

Archbishop Charles John Brown said: "It is an excellent decision for the people of Ireland and will be beneficial to Ireland in making its distinctive and important contribution to international relations. We are all grateful to those who worked so hard to make this day possible".

On 11 November 2014, the then–newly appointed Irish Ambassador to the Holy See, Emma Madigan presented her Letters of Credence to Pope Francis. It was reported that the Holy See was anxious to welcome her as a sign of thawing relations. Madigan's predecessor, David Cooney, had to wait several months before meeting Pope Benedict XVI.

== Irish Ambassadors to the Holy See ==
- Charles Bewley 1929–1933
- R.J.B Macaulay 1933–1940
  - T.J Kiernan (chargé d'affaires) 1940–1946
- Joseph Walshe 1946–1954
- Gearóid Ó Broin 1991–1998
- Eamon O Tuathail 1998–2001
- Philip McDonagh 2004–2007
- Noel Fahey 2007–2011
- David J. Cooney 2011–2014 (non-residential)
- Emma Madigan 2014–2018
- Derek Hannon 2018–2022
- Frances Collins 2022-

== State visits ==
Irish dignitaries have visited the Holy See, including in 2007 the president of Ireland Mary McAleese, the minister for foreign affairs Dermot Ahern, and the minister for education and science Mary Hanafin. No state visitor has yet been accorded the Privilège du blanc.

== See also ==
- Foreign relations of the Holy See
- Apostolic Nuncio to Ireland
- Foreign relations of the Republic of Ireland
- Religion in the Republic of Ireland
- Roman Catholicism in Ireland
- Holy See–United Kingdom relations
- Hiberno-Roman relations
