= Matthew Murphy (diplomat) =

Irish ambassador to Argentina
- In office 1947–1955
- Preceded by: Leopold H. Kerney
- Succeeded by: Timothy Joseph Horan

Personal details
- Born: 1 January 1890
- Died: 31 December 1967 (aged 77)

Matthew Murphy (1890–1967) was an Irish diplomat.

== Details ==
- In 1913 he entered the Civil Service of the Republic of Ireland and served in the departments of Education, Inland Revenue, National Health Insurance and Defence.
- In 1925 he joined the Department of External Affairs.
- From 1925 to 1929 he was Passport Control Officer in New York.
- From 1929 to 1933 he was Consul in New York.
- In 1933 he was Consul in Chicago.
- From 1933 to 1947 he was Consul in San Francisco.
- From 1947 to 1955 he was Chargé d’Affaires in Buenos Aires, with personal rank of Minister Plenipotentiary and opened the legation.
