= Embassy of Ireland, Berlin =

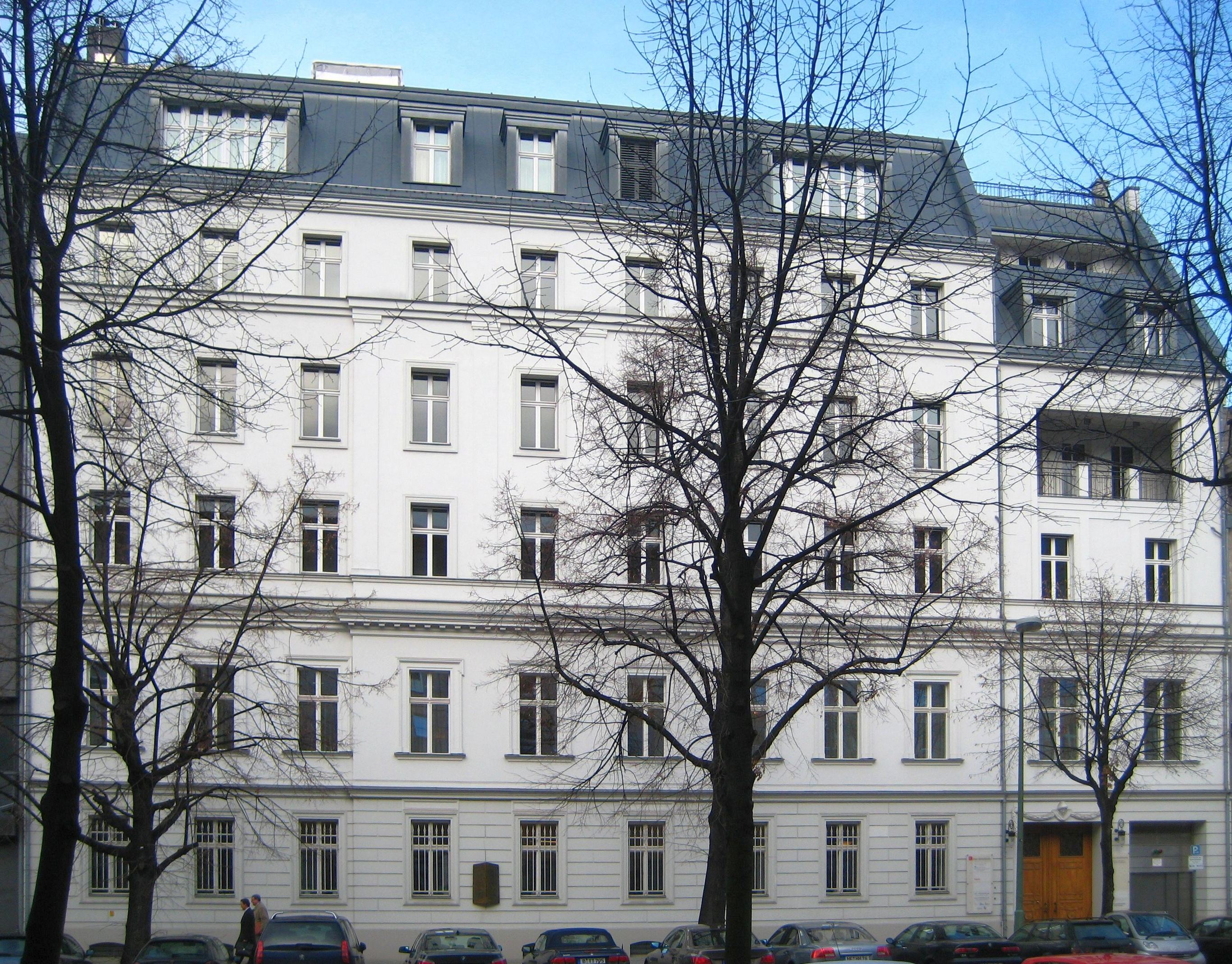
- Location: Berlin
- Address: Jägerstraße 51, 10117 Berlin
- Coordinates: 52.514371°N 13.395017°E
- Ambassador: Maeve Collins
- Website: Irish Embassy, Germany

The Embassy of Ireland in Berlin (German: Botschaft von Irland) is the diplomatic mission of Ireland to Germany. It is located at 51 Jägerstraße since 2009.

The current Ambassador to Germany is Maeve Collins who has served in this role since July 2024. She is Ireland's first ever female ambassador to Germany.

== Embassy History ==
The first Irish diplomatic mission in Germany was established in 1929 on Drakestraße, near Tiergarten. This building was destroyed in an air-raid during World War II.

In 1951, Ireland opened an embassy in Bonn, which was the de facto capital of West Germany. This embassy was eventually moved to Friedrichstraße, Berlin in 2000 after German Reunification.

== Building ==
The embassy occupies part of 51 Jägerstraße. This building was built by the Mendelssohn family in 1789. In 1939 it was, along with a number of other buildings on Jägerstraße, forcibly sold to the German Reich.

== List of Ambassadors ==
- Daniel A. Binchy 1929-1932
- Leo T. McCauley 1932-1933
- Charles Bewley 1933-1939
- William Warnock 1939-1944
- Cornelius Cremin 1944-1945
- John A. Belton 1951-1955
- Dr. Thomas Joseph ("Tommy", "T.J.") Kiernan 1955-1956
- William Warnock 1956-1962
- Brian Gallagher 1962-1964
- Eamonn Kennedy 1964-1970
- Paul Keating 1970-1972
- Seán Ronan 1972-1973
- Robert McDonagh 1973-1976
- Christopher P (Robin) Fogarty 1976-1983
- John Campbell 1983-1986
- Kester Heaslip 1986-1991
- Pádraig Murphy 1991-1998
- Noel Fahey 1998-2002
- Seán Ó hUiginn 2002-2006
- David Donoghue 2006-2009
- Dan Mulhall 2009-2013
- Michael Collins 2013-2019
- Dr. Nicholas O'Brien 2019-2024
- Maeve Collins 2024-Present

== See also ==
- Foreign relations of Germany
- Foreign relations of the Republic of Ireland
- List of diplomatic missions of the Republic of Ireland
