= List of ambassadors of Ireland to Malaysia =

Coordinates: 3.160966°N 101.728000°E

Ambassador of Ireland to Malaysia
- Ambasadóir na hÉireann go dtí an Mhalaeisia
- Coat of Arms of Ireland
- Incumbent; Orla Tunney since August 26, 2023
- Department of Foreign Affairs
- Style: Her Excellency
- Seat: Kuala Lumpur, Malaysia
- Nominator: Taoiseach (Prime Minister) of Ireland
- Appointer: President of Ireland
- Term length: 4 years
- Inaugural holder: Brendan Lyons
- Formation: 1995
- Deputy: Emma McLoughlin
- Website: Embassy of Ireland, Kuala Lumpur

The ambassador of Ireland to Malaysia is the head of Ireland's diplomatic mission to Malaysia, and the official representative of the government of Ireland to the government of Malaysia. The position has the rank and status of an ambassador extraordinary and plenipotentiary and is based in the Embassy of Ireland, Kuala Lumpur.

The incumbent ambassador is Orla Tunney, who was appointed on 26 August 2023.

== History ==
In 1995, Ireland opened a resident embassy in Malaysia. It was Ireland's first ever resident embassy in Southeast Asia. Ever since, the embassy has been located in the Amp Walk Building on Jalan Ampang.

== List of ambassadors ==
Designated/Diplomatic accreditation	Ambassador	Taoiseach	List of prime ministers of Malaysia	Term end
1995	Brendan Lyons	John Bruton (1995-1997)	Mahathir Mohamad	2000
1995	Brendan Lyons	Bertie Ahern (1997-2000)	Mahathir Mohamad	2000
2000	Bobby McDonagh	Bertie Ahern	Mahathir Mohamad	2001
July 19, 2001	Daniel Mulhall	Bertie Ahern	Mahathir Mohamad (2001-2003)	2005
July 19, 2001	Daniel Mulhall	Bertie Ahern	Abdullah Ahmad Badawi (2003-2005)	2005
April 19, 2005	Eugene Hutchinson	Bertie Ahern (2005-2008)	Abdullah Ahmad Badawi (2005-2009)	2010
April 19, 2005	Eugene Hutchinson	Brian Cowen (2008-2010)	Abdullah Ahmad Badawi (2005-2009)	2010
April 19, 2005	Eugene Hutchinson	Brian Cowen (2008-2010)	Mohammad Najib Abdul Razak (2009-2010)	2010
2010	Declan Kelly	Brian Cowen (2010-2011)	Mohammad Najib Abdul Razak	2015
2010	Declan Kelly	Enda Kenny (2011-2015)	Mohammad Najib Abdul Razak	2015
September 14, 2015	Eamon Hickey	Enda Kenny (2015-2017)	Mohammad Najib Abdul Razak (2015-2018)	July 11, 2019
September 14, 2015	Eamon Hickey	Leo Varadkar (2017-2019)	Mohammad Najib Abdul Razak (2015-2018)	July 11, 2019
September 14, 2015	Eamon Hickey	Leo Varadkar (2017-2019)	Mahathir Mohamad (2018-2019)	July 11, 2019
June 26, 2019	Hilary Reilly	Leo Varadkar	Mahathir Mohamad (2019-2020)	
June 26, 2019	Hilary Reilly	Leo Varadkar	Muhyiddin Yassin (2020-2021)	
August 26, 2023	Orla Tunney	Micheál Martin	Anwar Ibrahim (2022-current)	Incumbent
