= Dermot McCarthy =

Dermot McCarthy (born 1954) is a former Irish civil servant. McCarthy served as Secretary General to the Government of Ireland and Secretary General to the Department of the Taoiseach (Office of the Irish Prime Minister), two of the three most senior offices in the civil service.

Born in Dublin, he attended Synge Street CBS school and Trinity College Dublin. At Trinity College, he earned a Bachelor of Arts and Masters of Literature, both in Economics.

He joined the Irish Civil Service shortly after graduating from Trinity College and served in the Department of Industry and Commerce. From 1977, he worked at the Department of Health where he rose to the level of Assistant Secretary General.

He was appointed secretary to the government in January 2000 and combined that role with secretary to the Department of the Taoiseach in July 2001.

McCarthy is regarded as "somewhat socially conservative". He volunteered at St. Andrew's Resource Centre on Pearse Street, Dublin while attending Trinity College. Due to his fear of flying, McCarthy travelled to Pope John Paul II's funeral and in inauguration of Pope Benedict XVI in 2005 by ferry and by rail.

McCarthy played an enormous role in the Social Partnership process in Ireland. In 1990 he was appointed director of the National Economic and Social Council (NESC). As assistant secretary general in the Department of the Taoiseach with responsibility for the Economic and Social Policy Division from 1993 to 2000 he was a central figure in the Social Partnership agreements of that time. In January 2000 he became secretary general to the government, replacing Frank Murray, (attending Cabinet meetings) and, in July 2001, he combined this role with secretary general to the Department of the Taoiseach (replacing Dermot Gallagher). He continued his prominent role in social partnership negotiations in these new positions.

McCarthy was close to Taoiseach Brian Cowen on partnership and other issues and often accompanies him on official engagements in Ireland. In April 2011 after the 2011 general election it was announced that McCarthy intended to step down a few months ahead of schedule as part of a major reorganisation of the Civil Service. He also announced the government had decided to create a new post of second secretary in the Department of the Taoiseach to support the Economic Management Council established by the Coalition. He was succeeded by Martin Fraser on 1 August 2011.

McCarthy served as chair of the board of governors of All Hallows College, Dublin from 2012 until its closure in 2016. Since retiring he has volunteered at Westland Row, Church and in 2016 was ordained a deacon for the Archdiocese of Dublin.
