= Eoin MacWhite =

Irish diplomat, archaeologist, and scholar

Eoin MacWhite (1923–1972) was an Irish diplomat, archaeologist, and scholar.

== Birth ==
He was born in Geneva where his father, Michael MacWhite, was serving as a member of the delegation chosen to represent the newly independent Irish Free State. At the time, the Irish were applying to join the League of Nations. Eoin MacWhite was born on the same day that the Irish Free State's application for membership was approved. His birth coincided with a tragic event for the MacWhite family. On the very day he was born, his infant sister died suddenly. Each member of the Irish delegation attended the infant's funeral in Geneva.

== Education and career ==
He attended University College Dublin from 1940, ultimately earning a PhD in Archaeology. His important contributions to archaeology included work on Irish rock art and the Iberian Bronze Age. He joined the Irish diplomatic service and rose to the rank of ambassador, representing his country first at that rank in Australia and subsequently the Netherlands.

== Death ==
He was killed in a car accident in 1972.
