= Waterpark College =

Coordinates: 52.255914°N 7.101637°W

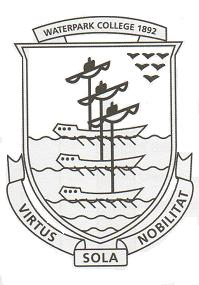
- Waterford; Ireland

Information
- Type: Mixed Secondary
- Motto: Virtus Sola Nobilitat
- Established: 1892
- Founder: Congregation of Christian Brothers
- Principal: Joe Haggan
- Chaplain: Fr. Paul Murphy
- Campus: Urban
- Colours: Red, Black and Purple
- Affiliations: Roman Catholic Congregation of Christian Brothers
- Sports: Rugby, volleyball, soccer, athletics, basketball, gaelic football, hurling, badminton, tennis, golf, equestrian
- Website: Waterpark College

Waterpark College is a secondary school in the city of Waterford, Ireland. The school was established in 1892 on the banks of the River Suir as Waterford's first Classical school, and provides a secondary education to boys and girls from Waterford City and County and the surrounding area.

== History ==
Waterpark College, Waterford's first classical school, was founded in 1892 by the Congregation of Christian Brothers. In 1986, Maurice O'Connor, the first lay principal of a Christian Brother's school, was hired. He was succeeded by Thomas A. Beecher, who became principal in 1990.

The school became co-educational in 2012.

== Sports ==
College rugby is tied to the local junior club Waterpark RFC since the club's foundation in 1925 in nearby Ballinakill, Waterford.

The primary sport at Waterpark College is rugby; however, the college also competes in badminton and track and field athletics. The college hosts an annual Junior Tag Rugby tournament, where teams from schools in the city are invited to participate. The college also field teams in GAA and Association football.

== Primary school ==
Waterpark National School is the official feeder school for Waterpark College. The school caters for boys and girls and has an enrollment of over 230 pupils. The Waterpark grounds are split into sites, one for the college and the other for the National School. Waterpark National School is situated at the north end of the college rugby pitch.

== Notable alumni ==
- Martin Cullen - former TD and Minister.
- John Hearne - chief architect of the Constitution of Ireland (1937)
- Mario Rosenstock - comedian, political satirist
- Father Joseph Patrick Slattery, C.M., physicist, radiologist, Catholic priest, pioneer in the field of radiography in Australia
