= Declan Kelly (diplomat) =

Irish diplomat

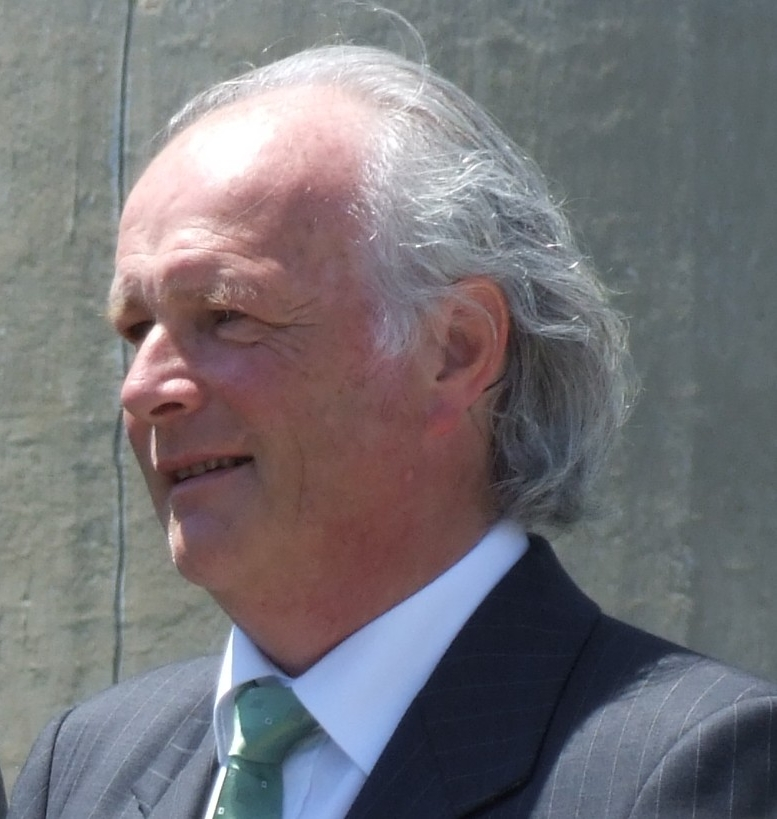
- Declan Kelly in 2007

Ambassador of Ireland to Malaysia
- In office 2010–2015
- President: Mary McAleese; Michael D. Higgins
- Prime Minister: Brian Cowen; Enda Kenny
- Preceded by: Eugene Hutchinson
- Succeeded by: Eamon Hickey

Ambassador of Ireland to Canada
- In office 2006–2010
- President: Mary McAleese
- Prime Minister: Bertie Ahern; Brian Cowen
- Preceded by: Martin Burke
- Succeeded by: Ray Bassett

Ambassador of Ireland to Australia
- In office September 2002 – September 2006
- President: Mary McAleese
- Prime Minister: Bertie Ahern
- Preceded by: Richard O'Brien
- Succeeded by: Máirtín Ó Fainín

Personal details
- Born: Declan Kelly
- Citizenship: Irish
- Spouse: Anne Bernadette Kelly
- Occupation: Diplomat

Declan Kelly was the Ambassador of Ireland to Malaysia and Thailand from 2010 to 2015. Prior to that appointment he was the Ambassador of Ireland to Canada from 2006 to 2010, succeeding Martin Burke.

He was schooled at St. Vincent's C.B.S., Glasnevin, and is married to Anne Bernadette Kelly. He gave the 2007 convocation address at St. Thomas University in New Brunswick.

Prior to his placement as ambassador at the Irish embassy in Ottawa, Kelly was the ambassador to Australia, New Zealand and Fiji. Earlier, Kelly had been posted to Ottawa from 1985 to 1990 as the First Secretary and Charge d’Affairs at the Irish Embassy.

Kelly was Republic of Ireland Consul General in San Francisco from 1992 to 1998.

Diplomatic posts
Preceded by Richard O'Brien	Ambassador of Ireland to Australia; 2002–2006	Succeeded by Máirtín Ó Fainín
Preceded by Martin Burke	Ambassador of Ireland to Canada; 2006–2010	Succeeded by Ray Bassett
Preceded by Eugene Hutchinson	Ambassador of Ireland to Malaysia; 2010–2015	Succeeded by Eamon Hickey
