= List of ambassadors of Ireland to the United States =

Ambassador of Ireland to the United States
- Coat of Arms of Ireland
- Incumbent; Geraldine Byrne Nason since August 2022
- Style: Her Excellency
- Inaugural holder: John Hearne (lawyer) The first Head of Mission at Ambassador rank
- Formation: 1925 (Envoy); 1950 (Ambassador)
- Website: Embassy of Ireland, USA

The Ambassador of Ireland to the United States is the head of the Embassy of Ireland, Washington, DC, and the official representative of the Government of Ireland to the Government of the United States.

Geraldine Byrne Nason, appointed Ambassador in August 2022, is incumbent as of April 2023.

The Irish Embassy is located at 1700 Pennsylvania Avenue, NW in The Mills Building near The White House. It was previously located at 2234 Massachusetts Avenue, NW in Sheridan Circle from 1949 until August 2025 and the Ambassador’s Residence is at 2221 30th Street NW.

== Ambassadors ==
- 2022 - Current: Geraldine Byrne Nason
- 2017 - 2022: Daniel Mulhall
- 2013 - 2017: Anne Anderson
- 2007 - 2013: Michael Collins
- 2002 - 2007: Noel Fahey
- 1997 - 2002: Sean O Huiginn
- 1991 - 1997: Dermot Gallagher
- 1985 - 1991: Padraic N. MacKernan
- 1984 - 1985: Tadhg O'Sullivan
- 1978 - 1984: Sean Donlon
- 1973 - 1978: John G. Molloy
- 1970 - 1973: William Warnock
- 1964 - 1969: William P. Fay
- 1960 - 1964: Thomas J. Kiernan
- 1950 - 1960: John Joseph Hearne
- 1947 - 1950: Sean Nunan
- 1938 - 1947: Robert Brennan
- 1929 - 1938: Michael MacWhite
- 1924 - 1929: Timothy Smiddy
