= Gerald Edward O'Kelly de Gallagh et Tycooly =

Irish diplomat

Count Gerald Edward O'Kelly de Gallagh et Tycooly
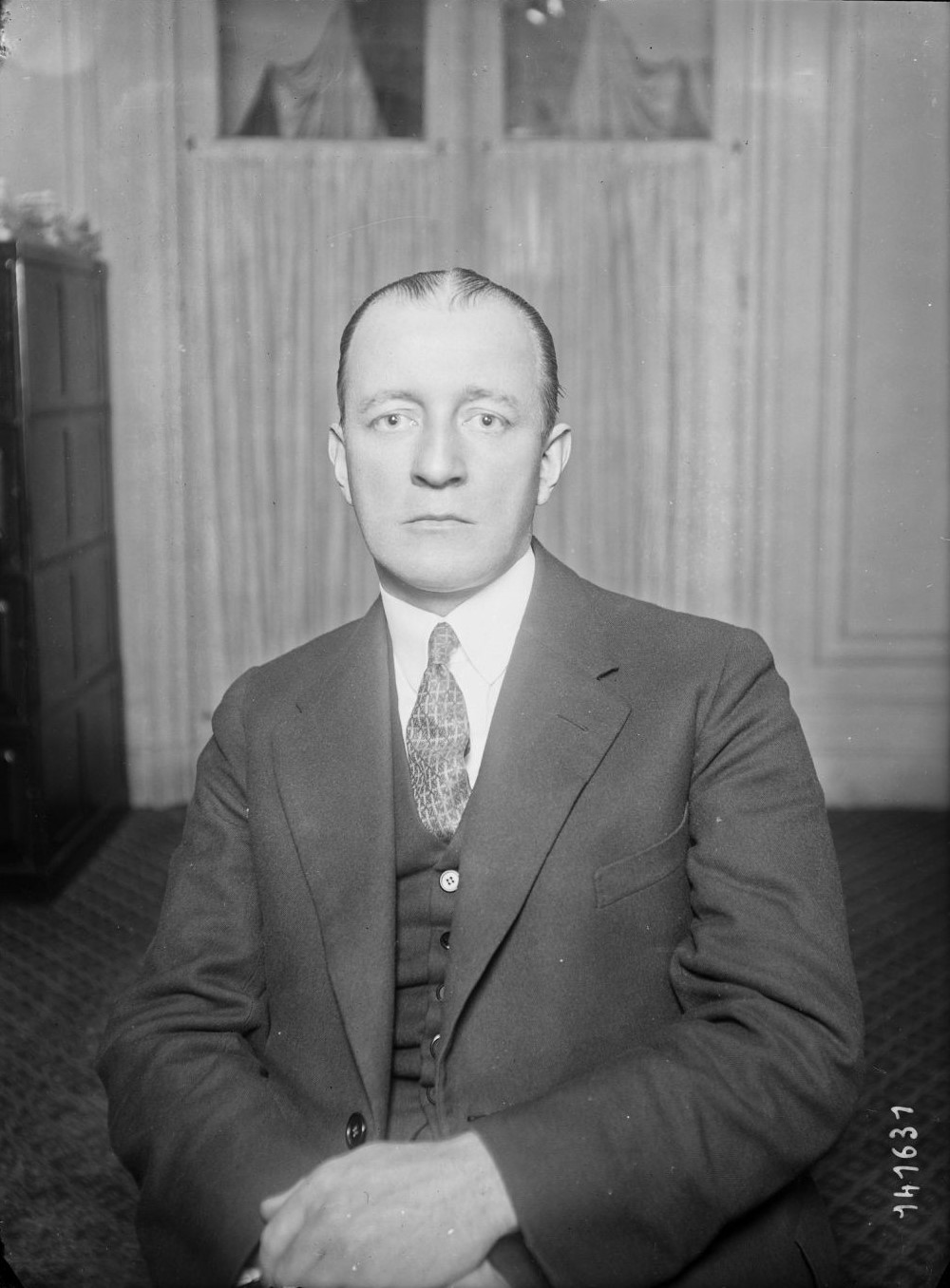
- O'Kelly in 1929

Irish Ambassador to France
- In office 1929–1935
- Preceded by: Leopold H. Kerney
- Succeeded by: Arthur Patrice O'Brien

Personal details
- Born: 11 March 1890 Gurtray House, near Portumna, Ireland
- Died: 3 January 1968 (aged 77) Lisbon, Portugal
- Education: Clongowes Wood College

Count Gerald Edward O'Kelly de Gallagh et Tycooly (11 March 1890 – 3 January 1968) was an Irish diplomat who served as ambassador to France and Belgium.

== Early life, education and family ==
O'Kelly was born in Gurtragh in North Tipperary, the son of Count John Appleyard O'Kelly and Mary O'Byrne. His mother was the daughter of Count John O'Byrne of Corville and granddaughter of Count Alexander von Hübner, the Austrian ambassador to France in 1849–58; she was born in Toulouse, France with Wild Geese ancestry.

Thanks to his mother he spoke and wrote fluent French. He was educated at Clongowes Wood College, Co Kildare, and the then Royal University of Ireland.

== Career ==
After travelling extensively in the Far East and America, O'Kelly saw active service in the World War I from 1915, and was wounded in action. He spent time in business in Yokohama, Japan and in other Asian cities. O'Kelly was the agent of Ireland's new Irish Free State government in Switzerland then in Belgium, then envoy extraordinary and minister plenipotentiary to France. He was the main force behind the diplomatic push to get Ireland a temporary seat in the League of Nations, using his extensive friendships with international diplomats.

While based in Brussels in 1924, Ireland and Capt. Jimmy Payne had won the World Dinghy Sailing Championship against 5 other nations. Gerald O'Kelly along with prince Leopold of Belgium and His Majesty King Albert I of the Belgians attended the celebratory dinner at Hotel des Boulevardes In Brussels.

Replaced as ambassador, O'Kelly was the sole Irish diplomat to remain in Paris throughout World War II, and negotiated successfully with the German occupiers to save many imprisoned Irish people, as well as giving Irish passports to needy British applicants. Through selling wines from his company Vendome Wines, he siphoned information from the occupying Nazis and passed it to the British.

In 1948, O'Kelly was appointed chargé d'affaires in Lisbon, Portugal, with the personal rank of minister; when he again retired in August 1955 he remained honorary counsellor to the Lisbon Irish legation. In 1962, he was again invited by the government of the Republic of Ireland to take up the post of chargé d'affaires at Lisbon, and so remained until his death He was involved the wine export trade, and was the French translator of Omar Khayyám.

== Honours ==
He was a count of the Holy Roman Empire, Knight of the Sovereign Order of Malta, Grand Officer of the Légion d'honneur, and a Grand Officer of the Order of Christ. In this private role he used his contacts to secure safety of Irish trapped in France in the years of occupation.

== Personal life and death ==
He married Amy Marjorie Stuart; they had no children. He died in Lisbon in 1968.

== Positions held ==
- From 1919 to 1921 he was Sinn Féin envoy to Bern.
- From 1921 to 1929 he was Irish representative to Brussels, Belgium.
- From 1929 to 1935 he was the first Minister Plenipotentiary to Paris.
- From 1935 to 1948 he was Special Counsellor at Paris and Brussels Legations
- From 1948 to 1968 he was Chargé d'affaires at Lisbon.
