= Seán Nunan =

Irish diplomat

Irish Ambassador to the United States
- In office designated: 10 June 1947, accredited: 20 June 1947 – 17 April 1950
- Preceded by: Robert Brennan (journalist)
- Succeeded by: John Hearne (lawyer)

Personal details
- Born: 1 January 1890 London
- Died: 31 December 1981 (aged 91)
- Spouse(s): Annie M Ryan, Grenanstown, Toomevara, Tipperary

Seán Nunan (1890–1981) was an Irish diplomat.

== Details ==
- In 1916 he was member of the Irish Volunteers in the General Post Office, Dublin garrison, fought in the Easter Rising, was interned in Frongoch internment camp and later served prison sentences for refusal to join the British Army during World War I.
- In 1919 he was Clerk of Dáil Éireann (Irish Republic).
- From 1919 to 1921 he was Secretary to Éamon de Valera and Registrar of the Dáil Éireann (Irish Republic) loan in the USA.
- From 1932 to 1938 he was Consul General, New York.
- From 1938 to 1941 he was First Secretary at the Irish legation in London.
- From 1941 to 1946 he was Consul General in Washington, D.C.
- From 1946 to 1947 he was Consul General, New York City.
- On 10 June 1947 he was designated Minister in Washington, D.C., where he was accredited from 20 June 1947 till 17 April 1950.
- In 1950 he was Assistant Secretary in the Department of External Affairs.
- From 1950 to 1955 he was Secretary in the Department of External Affairs
