= Cliona Manahan =

Irish politician and diplomat

Cliona Manahan has been the Irish Ambassador to the Czech Republic and the Ukraine since September 2019. From 2014 until 2019, she was Ambassador of Ireland to Denmark and Iceland and was Consul General of Ireland to Scotland.

Manahan graduated from Trinity College Dublin, earning a BA in Legal Science.

Manahan was married to Christopher Mark Leslie (1952–2026), son of Desmond Leslie, and they have two children: Luke Daniel Leslie (b. 1987) and Leah Leslie (b. 1992).
