= Emma Madigan =

Emma Madigan (born 6 July 1973) is an Irish diplomat and was the former Ambassador of Republic of Ireland to the Holy See, the first woman ever to hold the position.

== Early life and education ==
Madigan attended University College Dublin earning a BA in History and Italian in 1995. She remained at UCD and earned an MA in European Studies in 1996.

== Career ==
Madigan joined the diplomatic service and was Third Secretary from 2000–2002. She went on to serve as vice consul to the Consulate-General in New York from August 2000 until 2005. She was appointed First Secretary and returned to Dublin in 2006 remaining until 2008. She returned to the United States as First Secretary at the Consulates General in New York, Boston and Chicago from 2009 – August 2012. In September 2012 she was appointed Deputy Head of Protocol and assisted in the visit of President Higgins to the United Kingdom.

She was appointed as the Ambassador of Ireland to the Holy See after the re-opening of the residential embassy. The announcement of her appointment to the "prestigious position" came a week after the Irish Prime Minister visited the Vatican for the joint canonization of Popes John Paul II and John XXIII and invited the Pope Francis to visit Ireland. The Vatican quickly welcomed her, in a sign interpreted as interest in thawing the relationship with Ireland. Madigan's predecessor, David Cooney, had to wait several months before meeting Pope Benedict XVI. Madigan presented her Letters of Credence to Pope Francis on 11 November 2014.

Madigan described her welcome as "a great experience": "I was received very warmly by Pope Francis although the ceremony itself around the credentials was formal, the discussion itself was informal and it was a very relaxed conversation." The Ambassador says that this conversation "covered many things. We spoke of priorities that are very dear to Ireland such as our development program, our concern regarding the plight of Christians and other religious minorities in the world today. I was able to update Pope Francis on talks in Northern Ireland and of course on recent developments in Ireland more broadly."

Ambassador Madigan said Pope Francis "responded very well to the updates I was giving him and expressed very warm interest in our development program, which perhaps in many ways chimes with his own messages in ensuring that the vulnerable and marginalized are not left behind."

In June 2018 it was announced that Madigan would return to Ireland to a post in the Department of Foreign Affairs and Trade. Madigan was received in audience on 6 September 2018 to present her Letters of Recall and the end of her mission pending the placet for the new Irish ambassador to the Holy See, Derek Hannon.

On 25 September 2018, when Pope Francis visited Ireland, Madigan participated in welcoming him. The Pope visited Áras an Uachtaráin, where he met with President Michael D. Higgins, his wife Sabina Higgins, government minister Katherine Zappone, Ambassador of Ireland to the Holy See Emma Madigan, the Catholic Primate of All Ireland Archbishop Eamon Martin, Archbishop of Dublin Diarmuid Martin, the Secretary of State of the Vatican Cardinal Pietro Parolin, and Syrian asylum seekers, amongst others. The Pope signed the visitors' book with the following message: "With gratitude for the warm welcome I have received. I assure you and the people of Ireland of my prayers that almighty god may guide and protect you all. Francis." Upon being handed a ceremonial shovel by head gardener Robert Norris, Pope Francis planted a tree in the President's back garden, a tradition which his predecessor Pope John Paul II had also performed nearby.

Madigan is credited with improving relations between Ireland and the Vatican, with assistance from former papal nuncio Archbishop Charles Brown. Madigan was successful is smoothing the relationship between the Holy See and the Irish government after a very tense period during which Tánaiste Eamon Gilmore closed the Irish Embassy at the Vatican. While publicly presented as a cost saving measure, it was widely recognized as a "rebuke to the Vatican over Church mishandling of allegations of clerical abuse."

== Personal ==
Madigan is married and has one son. She speaks English, Irish, and Italian.

Diplomatic posts
Preceded by David Cooney	Ambassador to the Holy See; 11 November 2014 – 6 September 2018	Succeeded by Derek Hannon
