= List of ambassadors of Ireland to the Czech Republic =

The Ambassador of Ireland to the Czech Republic is the head of the Embassy of Ireland, Prague, and the official representative of the Government of Ireland to the Government of the Czech Republic.

The incumbent Ambassador is Cliona Manahan who was appointed in September 2019.

== Diplomatic relations between Ireland and the Czech Republic ==
Ireland and Czechoslovakia initially had contacts had contacts through the League of Nations. A Czechoslovak Consulate was established in Dublin in 1929 and was upgraded to a Legation in 1947. Communism's arrival in 1948 interrupted the development of diplomatic relations until 1965 when a Czechoslovak Trade Mission was established in Dublin. This was upgraded to an embassy in 1995. The Irish Trade Office opened in Prague in 1991 and the Irish Embassy in Vienna was responsible for diplomatic relations until 1995 when an Embassy was established in Prague.

== Ambassadors ==
- Marie Cross (September 1995 – July 1999)
- Michael Collins (diplomat) (August 1999 – July 2001)
- Joe Hayes (October 2001 – August 2005)
- Donal Hamill (September 2005 – October 2009)
- Richard Ryan (December 2009 – November 2011)
- Alison Kelly (February 2012 – August 2015)
- Charles Sheehan (August 2015 – August 2019)
- Cliona Manahan (August 2019 –)
