= Derek Hannon =

Politician

Derek Hannon (born 3 August 1960) is the current Irish ambassador to the Holy See since he presented his Letters of Credence to Pope Francis on 9 November 2018.

Hannon was born in 1960 and is unmarried. He holds a degree in science of education, as well as a MA in history from University College Dublin.

He joined the Irish Civil Service and from 1986 to 1987 was third secretary at the Department for Political Affairs of the Ministry of Foreign Affairs, from 1987 to 1988 was third secretary in the Department of Economic Affairs of the Ministry of Foreign Affairs. He was posted abroad and served as part of the Irish delegation to the Holy See as third secretary from 1988 to 1992.

He returned to Dublin in 1992 and worked in the Economic section at the Foreign Ministry until 1994 when he was promoted to first secretary for a year in Dublin before being posted to Budapest, Hungary where he served from 1995 to 1999. He returned to Dublin as first secretary at the Office for Anglo-Irish Affairs at the Foreign Ministry where he worked until 2004. He served as first embassy secretary in London until 2008 and worked as first secretary at the Department for Disarmament and Non-Proliferation of the Ministry of Foreign Affairs and Trade until 2011.

He was posted to the United States where he was first secretary until 2015 and then back to Dublin as first secretary at the Department for the European Union of the Ministry of Foreign Affairs and Trade until 2018.

He was received by Pope Francis on 9 November 2018 to present his Letters of Credence on behalf of the Irish Government to begin his mission to the Holy See replacing Emma Madigan. He was replaced in November 2022 by Frances Collins.

He speaks English and Italian.

Diplomatic posts
Preceded by Emma Madigan	Ambassador to the Holy See; 9 November 2018 – November 2022	Succeeded by Frances Collins
