= Dermot Gallagher (civil servant) =

Irish civil servant and Secretary General of Department of Foreign Affairs

Secretary General of the Department of Foreign Affairs
- Succeeded by: David J. Cooney

Personal details
- Born: Dermont Anthony Gallagher; 1944 Carrick-on-Shannon, County Leitrim, Ireland
- Died: 15 January 2017 (aged 72) Dublin, Ireland
- Education: University College Dublin

Dermot Anthony Gallagher (1944 – 15 January 2017) was an Irish civil servant and the Secretary General of the Department of Foreign Affairs. He left office as Secretary-General on 24 January 2009 and was replaced by David Cooney, former Ambassador to the United Kingdom. In February 2009 he was nominated to be Chairman of the Garda Síochána Ombudsman Commission and was appointed Chairman of University College Dublin Governing Authority.

== Early life ==
Gallagher was born in Carrick-on-Shannon, County Leitrim, where he played at left half forward for Leitrim at minor and Under-21 level. He was the son of a Garda sergeant. His interest in the wider world was sparked by observing Guinness barges arriving in his native town and speculating about their places of origin. This curiosity was refined under the tutelage of Professor Desmond Williams, who taught a course on diplomatic history at University College Dublin.

== Early career ==
Having taken his MA in History at UCD, Gallagher joined the Civil Service applying for a position in the Department of External Affairs, as it was then called, starting in the job on 6 January 1969. His first minister was Frank Aiken, who usually talked to him in Irish, having learned that his new junior official was fluent in the language. Later that year, Aiken was succeeded by Dr Patrick Hillery and then the event took place that was to shape Gallagher's life: the North erupted into violence.

On Saturday, 16 August 1969, Gallagher, as weekend duty officer for the department, encountered a group of nationalist MPs from the North, including Paddy Devlin, who arrived at Iveagh House demanding to meet Taoiseach Jack Lynch to obtain arms for the beleaguered Catholics of the Falls Road in Belfast. He told them he would convey their request for a meeting to his superiors in the department.

== Foreign service ==
His first foreign posting was to the Irish consulate in San Francisco in August 1971 – he and his college sweetheart, Maeve Farrell, from Ratoath, Co Meath, had just been married the previous month. After a few sojourns at the United Nations in New York City, Gallagher found himself at the Irish Embassy in London serving from 1973 to 1977 as press officer. He was present at the Sunningdale negotiations in 1973, leading to the ill-fated powersharing deal. He was sent to Brussels in the early 1980s as a deputy chef de cabinet with the European Commission.

He got his first ambassadorial posting in 1985 – in Lagos, Nigeria, where his contacts with Irish missionaries in particular taught him "a great deal about what matters in life". He returned to Dublin to take charge of the Anglo-Irish division, with responsibility for Northern Ireland policy. That was the time of the Anglo-Irish Agreement, which Charles Haughey had vehemently opposed in opposition. But when Haughey took over as Taoiseach in 1987 he told Gallagher he wanted the agreement implemented "fully and imaginatively". He was appointed Ambassador to the US in 1991 where, as usual, he quickly developed a wide range of friendships and contacts. One of these was Bill Clinton, then governor of Arkansas.

His White House contacts proved advantageous when the nascent Irish peace process faced its first major challenge: securing a US visa for Sinn Féin leader Gerry Adams. After his posting in Washington DC he returned home in 1997 with the title of Second Secretary General. Bertie Ahern was Taoiseach and eager to make a contribution to peace in the North. Gallagher put together a team of officials for the negotiations at Stormont, including David Cooney, who succeeded him as secretary general. After the success of the Good Friday Agreement, Gallagher moved to the Department of the Taoiseach as Secretary General of that department. After his departure, this post was combined with the position of Secretary-General to the Government, under Dermot McCarthy. Then it was back to Iveagh House as that department's Secretary-General.

== Academic career ==
The Governing Authority of University College Dublin approved the appointment of Gallagher as chairman on Tuesday, 24 February 2009, to replace Kieran McGowan, who chaired the Governing Authority since February 2004.
