= James Wilfrid Lennon =

Irish diplomat

Irish Ambassador to Portugal
- In office January 1961 – 1 April 1962
- Preceded by: Francis Coffey
- Succeeded by: Denis J. O'Sullivan

Irish Ambassador to the Netherlands
- In office 1 April 1962 – 1966
- Succeeded by: Richard Ryan

Irish Ambassador to Spain
- In office 1962–1967
- Preceded by: Timothy Joseph Horan
- Succeeded by: Brian Gallagher

Irish Permanent Representative to the United Nations at Geneva
- In office 1967–1973
- Succeeded by: Timothy Joseph Horan

Irish Ambassador to Argentina
- In office 1973–1976
- Preceded by: Michael Leo Skentelberry
- Succeeded by: Seán Ó hÉideáin

Personal details
- Born: 29 December 1915 Dundalk

James Wilfrid Lennon (29 December 1915 – 30 August 2012) was an Irish diplomat.

== Career ==
From the 1930s until 1947, he was employed by the Civil Service of the Republic of Ireland. In 1947 he entered the Department of Foreign Affairs and Trade (Ireland) as Third Secretary, and rose through the ranks, serving as First Secretary in Paris (until 1960), then ambassador to Portugal (January 1961 to 1 April 1962). From 1 April 1962 until 1966 he was Ambassador to the Netherlands in The Hague, with co-accreditation in Copenhagen to Denmark. From 1967 till 1970 he was Ambassador to Spain in Madrid, then Permanent Representative of Ireland to the United Nations Office at Geneva, a post he held until 1973. From there he was sent to Buenos Aires in Argentina, and after three hectic years in Buenos Aires, he returned ill to Dublin where he, on 28 June 2003, resided.
