= Frances Collins (diplomat) =

Frances Collins (born 15 October 1980) is an Irish diplomat and is the Ambassador of Ireland to the Holy See, the second woman to hold the position.

== Early life and education ==
Collins was born in Cork on 15 October 1980. She attended the University of Limerick and earned a Bachelor of Arts in History, Politics and Social Studies in 2003 and Masters of Arts in European Integration the following year.

== Career ==
Collins is a career diplomat who joined Ireland’s Department of Foreign Affairs in 2008. She started her career in the Development Cooperation and Africa Division of the Department of Foreign Affairs more commonly known as Irish Aid, serving in the Public Information and Development Education Unit and later in the Humanitarian Unit as Desk Officer for West, Central and East Africa. She served from 2014 to 2017 as Second Secretary in the Embassy of Ireland to Uganda. From 2017 to 2019, she served as Deputy Head of Mission and Head of Political Section with the Delegation of the European Union to South Sudan.

Returning to the Department of Foreign Affairs in 2019, she served as Deputy Director of the Disarmament and Non Proliferation Section with responsibility for Nuclear Weapons, Missiles and Space. She led on Ireland’s preparations for the Tenth Nuclear Non Proliferation (NPT) Review Conference, which took place in August 2022 and was a member of Ireland’s delegation to the First Meeting of State Parties on the Treaty on Prohibition of Nuclear Weapons (TPNW) in June that same year. She was a member of Ireland’s delegation to the United Nations General Assembly First Committee on Disarmament and International Security in 2019.

She presented her Letters of Credence to Pope Francis on 28 November 2022. In a 2024 interview Collins underlined the joint collaboration between the Holy See and Ireland on multilateralism and nuclear non-proliferation.
