= Leopold H. Kerney =

Irish politician & diplomat (1881-1962)

Leopold Harding Kerney

Irish Ambassador to France from Ireland to France
- In office 1923–1925
- Succeeded by: Count Gerald Edward O'Kelly de Gallagh et Tycooly

Irish Ambassador to Spain from Ireland to Spain
- In office January 1, 1935 – December 31, 1946
- Succeeded by: John Aloysius Belton

Personal details
- Born: 11 December 1881 Dublin
- Died: 8 June 1962 (aged 80) Dublin
- Spouse(s): Raymonde (m. 14 August 1914), daughter of Pierre Elie, cooper, and Eugénie Julie Verdier, of Saint-Caprice, France.
- Children: John/Jean, Micheline, and Eamon.
- Parents: Philip Joseph Kerney, journalist, sub-editor of the Daily Express (Dublin) and editor of the Weekly Irish Times. (father); Annie Kerney (née Knight). (mother)
- Education: spent some years at Trinity College, Dublin, though he left without graduating.

Leopold H. Kerney (11 December 1881 – 8 June 1962) was the first Irish Minister Plenipotentiary to be appointed to Spain and remained at this post from 1935 until his retirement in 1946. He could be termed a "diplomat by accident" as he began his career in the Irish diplomatic service at the age of 38 when, being primarily interested in promoting direct trade between Ireland and France where he was living at the time, he visited Arthur Griffith in 1919 who appointed him trade representative, then Consul in Paris. The most publicised events of his career during his period in Spain concern his contacts with German agents between 1940 and 1942.

== Details ==
- From 1901 to 1911 he travelled through Britain, France, Belgium, Germany, and Italy.
- In 1912 he settled in Paris where he became the chief accountant at Lucile, a fashion house.
- From 1914 to 1918 he was manager of Lucile.
- From 1919 to 1922 he was Irish commercial representative in Paris.
- From 1923 to 1925 he was Irish Republican Envoy in Paris.
- From 1932 to 1935 he was Commercial Secretary in Paris.
- From 1935 to 1946 he was Minister in Madrid 1937 Salamanca and Saint-Jean de Luz.
- In May 1936 he was diagnosed with Poliomyelitis, following a period of treatment in Madrid, was recuperating at Isla de La Toja when the Spanish Civil War broke out.
- He returned to Madrid to offer consular service to the POWs of Eoin O'Duffy's brigade.
- In June 1939 he visited Frank Ryan (Irish republican) in Burgos Prison.
- On 24 August 1942 he met with Edmund Veesenmayer.
- In 1941 he visited with Frank Aiken and Seán Nunan, António de Oliveira Salazar in Lisbon, where from mid 1942 to 1945 Colman John O'Donovan(1893–1975) was the first Chargé d'affaires.
- In 1943 he was recalled to Dublin.
- He returned to Madrid and after April 30, 1944, he offered condolences to Sigismund von Bibra, the German chargé d'affaires in Madrid.
- In 1947 he led an Irish commercial mission to buy wheat in Buenos Aires.
