= Michael Collins (diplomat) =

Irish diplomat

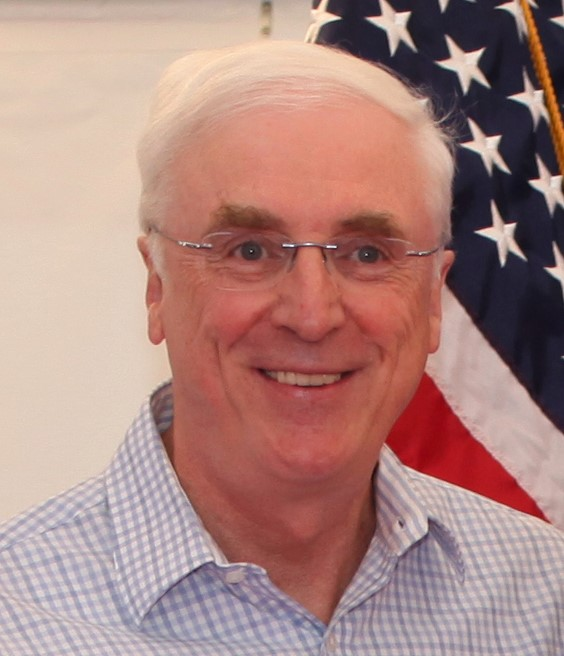
Michael Collins in Berlin 2017

Michael Collins (born 25 June 1953, Dublin, Ireland) is a retired Irish diplomat. Collins retired after his tenure as Ambassador to Germany (2013-2019). He was also Ambassador to the United States from 2007 to 2013, Saudi Arabia from 1995 to 1999 and to the Czech Republic from 1999 to 2001.

As of 18 November 2019, he has been Director General of The Institute of International and European Affairs.

Collins attended Blackrock College, Dublin and Trinity College, Dublin.
