= Pádraig MacKernan =

Irish diplomat (1940–2010)

- Born: 24 April 1940; Limerick, Ireland
- Died: 25 January 2010 (aged 69)
- Resting place: Ballynahinch, County Galway
- Other names: Paddy MacKernan
- Occupations: Diplomat, Irish Ambassador to France and the United States, Secretary General (Head) Irish Department of Foreign Affairs, Member of EC and EU Council of Permanent Representatives (COREPER), Member of the Political Committee of the European Economic Community (EEC) and European Community (EC), Teacher.

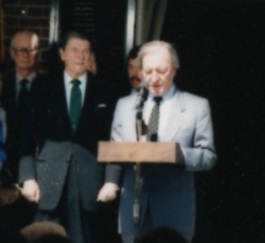
Padraig MacKernan and Ronald Reagan

Pádraig MacKernan (24 April 1940 – 25 January 2010) was an Irish diplomat who served as Secretary General of the Irish Department of Foreign Affairs as well as Irish Ambassador to both France and the United States and as an Irish member of the EEC and EC's Political Committee and later the EC and EU's Committee of Permanent Representatives, and as an Irish negotiator of the Single European Act and the Maastricht Treaty.

== Early life and education ==
MacKernan was born, the first of eight children to survive, in a small house in Clare Street, Limerick. During the last days of World War II, his family was informed that one of MacKernans' uncles had died, one of three who were serving in the Royal Air Force, an event he was to frequently recall in his subsequent career. The first in his family to achieve a degree, he attended Crescent College and University College, Galway (UCG) from which he graduated in 1962 with a Bachelor of Arts in French and English and was elected Auditor (head) of the university's Literary & Debating Society in 1961. He then attended the Sorbonne and the Bibliothèque nationale de France, while also teaching at the Lycée Condorcet, earning a master's degree focussing on the works of Jean-Paul Sartre and becoming fully bilingual in French and English – he was already an Irish speaker. While a student at UCG and the Sorbonne he met fellow student Caitríona Gavin, who he subsequently married on returning to Ireland in 1963, where he taught French and English in Gorey Co Wexford.

== Career ==
=== 1960s through 1980s ===
In 1964, he joined the Irish Department of Foreign Affairs and in 1965 was assigned to the United States, initially to Boston as vice-counsel and later New York as deputy counsel general. During this period his wife Caitríona taught French and mathematics in the South Bronx. In 1969, he assisted with the development of Ireland's case in relation to the Northern Ireland conflict for the United Nations Security Council, embarking on trips with then Minister for Foreign Affairs (later President) Patrick Hillery to Ottawa in Canada and Washington, D.C. in the United States in search of support from politicians and people there. It was during this part of his career that he met Robert F. Kennedy, Senator for New York, Ted Kennedy, Senator for Massachusetts and Congressman (later Speaker) Tip O'Neill also of Massachusetts.

In 1974, he came back to Ireland to concentrate on matters relating to the country's position in Europe and accession to the EEC. Appointed Assistant Secretary and Political Director in 1980, as a member of the powerful, but largely unheard of European Economic Community's Political Committee, he was a key negotiator of the Single European Act, which evolved the EEC into the European Community, a role facilitated by his complete fluency in both French and English, then the two Working languages of the EEC; as political director he was also a main Irish participant in European Political Cooperation, a role in which he travelled widely in connection with East Europe/West Europe relations and other priorities such as the Arab/Israeli conflict.

In 1985, he was made Irish Ambassador to the United States and Mexico. During this period he advocated the support of Congress for the Anglo-Irish Agreement of 1985 and the establishment of The American Ireland Fund by merging the then American Irish Foundation and Ireland Fund. He also assisted Congressmen Brian Donnelly and Bruce Morrison, House Speaker Tip O'Neill and Senators Ted Kennedy and Alan Simpson, in a systematic campaign of advocacy that regularised the status of many undocumented Irish citizens in the United States (generally known as the "Irish Illegals"). In his capacity as Ambassador to Mexico he was involved in arranging commemoration of the service of Mexico's Irish Brigade, the Batallón de San Patricio, a role he was to reprise when he accompanied the President of Ireland, Mary McAleese in 1999 when she laid a wreath at the Battalion memorial in the course of a state visit to Mexico.

=== 1990s and 2000s ===
In 1991 he was appointed Irish Permanent Representative (Ambassador) to the European Union. There, as one of only two members at that time of the Committee of Permanent Representatives or COREPER, who had previously been a political director in his foreign service (and thus a former member of the EEC's political committee, where earlier multilateral amendments to the treaties had been negotiated), he was considered particularly effective as a major Irish negotiator of the Maastricht Treaty, which converted the European Community into the European Union as well as establishing the single currency or Euro, in negotiating for Ireland large subventions from the EU's Structural Funds and Cohesion Funds, and in negotiations relating to Europe's Common Agricultural Policy. He was also involved in the conversion of the Irish College of St Anthony in Louvain into the Leuven Institute for Ireland in Europe. as well as assisting in securing funds from the Ireland Funds for the construction of the Round Tower commemorating the Irish dead of World War I at the Island of Ireland Peace Park, the dedication of which he was later to attend as Secretary General of the Department of Foreign Affairs in 1998.

In 1995, he was appointed Secretary General (i.e., the permanent civil service head or Permanent Secretary) of Ireland's Department of Foreign Affairs. and during his tenure, oversaw the opening of more than twenty new Irish diplomatic missions in Europe, Latin America and Asia and also contributed to Irish negotiations with respect to the Treaty of Amsterdam amending the Maastricht Treaty and Single European Act. He also directed the campaign for Ireland's election to the United Nations Security Council. Later in his tenure he had a dispute with a newly appointed Minister for Foreign Affairs, David Andrews, relating to the promotion and posting of diplomats and the demarcation between the apolitical role of the service in proposing candidates and the political role of the Government in confirming them. In 1998, the impasse became public and received wide coverage in Irish media.

In 2001, he was made Irish Ambassador to France. In Paris he was notable in promoting Franco-Irish relations in the political, economic and cultural areas. As a member of the Board of Management, he supported the restoration of the historic Irish College in Paris and its transformation into the Irish Cultural Centre. As ambassador to France he attended various British commemorations for World War I and II in his official capacity. His achievements in France were recognised by the French Government when he was honoured as a Grand Officier de l'Ordre national du Mérite shortly before his retirement.

== Later life and death ==
In 2005, he retired. In 2009, he was awarded an honorary doctorate from UCG. In retirement he served as a director of the Irish College in Paris and as a member of the board of the Alliance Française and started to write as yet not published memoirs; freed of the constraints of the Irish Civil Service on holding open political views he also became a member of the Labour Party.

In January 2010, he died of idiopathic pulmonary fibrosis, survived by his wife Caitríona and sons Dónal, Colm and Dara. Labour Party TD Ruairi Quinn paid a special tribute, followed later by Enda Kenny, the leader of the opposition and Fine Gael, the Tánaiste (deputy prime minister) and other political figures in the houses of the Oireachtas. He was cremated after a humanist ceremony on 28 January 2010 and his ashes were scattered in the river at Ballynahinch, County Galway after a short ceremony.
