= Mary Tinney =

Irish diplomat

Mary Catherine Tinney

Irish Ambassador to Sweden
- In office November 1973 – November 1978
- Preceded by: Timothy Joseph Horan
- Succeeded by: Orla O'Hanrahan

Irish Ambassador to Belgium
- In office November 1978 – 1984
- Preceded by: Seán Morrissey
- Succeeded by: Andrew O'Rourke

Irish Ambassador to Kenya
- In office 1985–1987
- Preceded by: Michael Greene
- Succeeded by: Richard O'Brien with residence in Cairo also accredited to Sudan and Jordan.

Personal details
- Born: 15 February 1924 Scotland
- Died: 22 November 2006 (aged 82) Dublin
- Parents: Éamon Tinney (father); Winifred Reid (mother)
- Education: University College, Dublin

Mary Catherine Tinney (15 February 1924 – 22 November 2006) was the Irish ambassador to Sweden from 1973 to 1978, and was Ireland's first female ambassador.

== Life and career ==
=== Early life ===
Tinney's parents were Irish migrants living in Scotland; her father Éamon was a tax official from Donegal and her mother Winifred (née Reid) a teacher from County Londonderry. In 1930, when Tinney was six years old, her family returned from Scotland to Carlingford, County Louth, where her father was killed in an accident, leaving his widow with four young children. The family moved to Dublin, where Tinney's mother taught in a convent school and trained choirs. Tinney attended University College, Dublin, graduating with BA Honours.

=== Diplomatic career ===
In 1948 Tinney entered the Irish foreign service as Third Secretary in London. From 1950 to 1963 she was posted to Stockholm, where she learned Swedish and danced an Irish jig before Gustaf VI Adolf of Sweden. From 1963 to 1970 she was counsellor in Paris and delegate to the Organisation for Economic Co-operation and Development (OECD) during the period that the OECD began to engage itself more with Irish affairs. From 1970 to 1973 she was in charge of cultural affairs in Dublin and non-resident permanent representative to the Council of Europe. In 1973 she was briefly deployed as minister-counsellor at the London embassy.

From November 1973 to November 1978 she was ambassador to Sweden, concurrently accredited to Finland and Poland. This was the first time a woman was appointed as a full Irish ambassador. From 1 November 1956 to June 1960 Josephine McNeill had served as head of the Irish delegation in Bern, Switzerland, with the title of minister but did not hold ambassadorial rank. Tinney went on to serve as Ambassador to Belgium and the European Community, from November 1978 to 1984, and from November 1985 to 1987 to Nairobi in Kenya, with co-accreditation to Tanzania and Zambia. While Tinney was stationed at Nairobi, the embassy was closed.

== Personal life ==
Tinney was a skilled pianist, and used to host regular music evenings in her ambassadorial residences. She was also a keen golfer and a bridge enthusiast.
