= Anne Barrington =

Irish diplomat

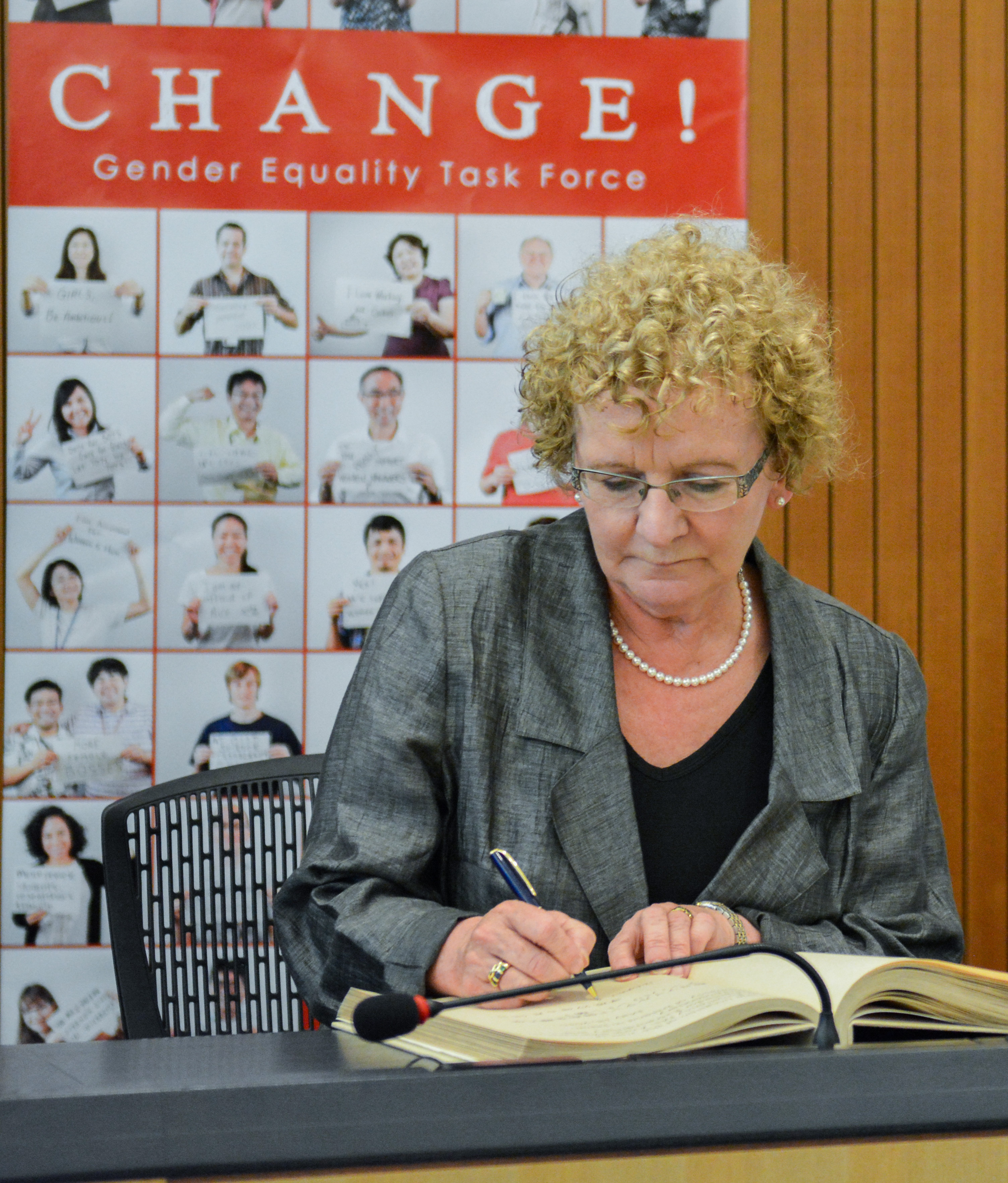
- Anne Barrington (2015)
- Born: April 8, 1953 (age 73)
- Occupation: diplomat
- Spouse: Ed Miliano

Anne Barrington (born 8 April 1953) is an Irish diplomat. She served as Irish ambassador to Japan and represented the Government of Ireland as a Special Envoy to the United Nations as part of Ireland's successful bid to join the UN Security Council for 2021 and 2022.

== Career ==
Barrington served as an Ambassador in Tanzania, Kenya and Burundi. She was Ambassador in Japan during the 60th anniversary of diplomatic relations between the countries in 2016. She was a Joint-Secretary to the North/South Ministerial Council, a body set-up by the Good Friday Agreement. In 2022, Barrington chaired the shared island research unit in the Department of the Taoiseach.
