= Geraldine Byrne Nason =

Irish diplomat

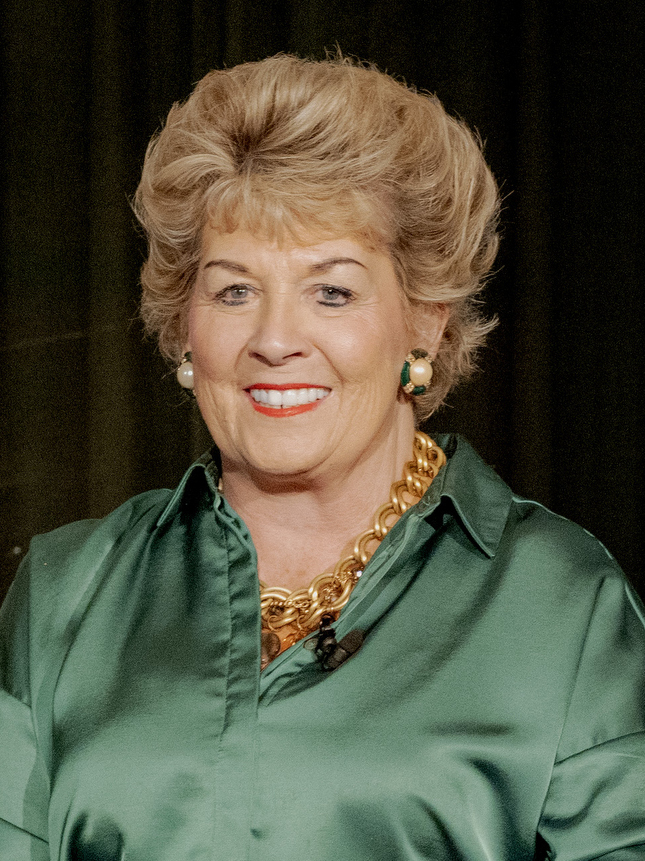
- Nason in 2024

Ambassador of Ireland to the United States
- Incumbent
- Assumed office August 2022
- President: Michael D. Higgins; Catherine Connolly
- Taoiseach: Micheál Martin; Leo Varadkar; Simon Harris
- Preceded by: Daniel Mulhall

Personal details
- Born: 1959 (age 66–67) Drogheda, Ireland
- Citizenship: Irish
- Education: St Patrick's College, Maynooth

Geraldine Byrne Nason (born 1959) is an Irish diplomat who is currently Ambassador of Ireland to the United States of America.

== Early life and education ==
Byrne Nason was born in Drogheda in 1959, and attended Our Lady's College, Greenhills. She has a BA and MA in Literature from St Patrick's College, Maynooth.

== Career ==
Byrne Nason joined the Department of Foreign Affairs in 1981. She was Director for Governance at the Organisation for Economic Co-operation and Development in Paris in the 1990s. She has served at the UN in New York, Vienna, Geneva, and Helsinki.

Byrne Nason served as Second Secretary General of the Department of the Taoiseach from 2011 until 2014, making her the highest-ranking female civil servant in the country. In summer 2014, she produced a report of issues that might affect Ireland if the United Kingdom left the European Union.

In August 2014, Byrne Nason was appointed Ireland's Ambassador to France and Monaco. Alongside her Swedish counterpart, she started an informal network of women ambassadors and journalists in Paris.

In August 2017, Byrne Nason was appointed as Ireland's permanent representative to the UN in New York by Taoiseach Leo Varadkar, replacing David Donoghue. She was tasked with trying to secure Ireland a seat on the UN Security Council in 2020 and this effort was successful.

In 2018 and 2019 Nason chaired the 62nd and 63rd sessions of the UN Commission on the Status of Women.

From January 2021 she held the Irish seat at the U.N. Security Council for its two-year tenure, being President of the council for the month of September 2021.

In 2022 she was appointed Ambassador of Ireland to the United States of America. She is also accredited to Barbados, presenting her credentials to President of Barbados Sandra Mason in 2024.

She marched with United States Representative Richard E. Neal at the 2025 Holyoke St. Patrick's Parade.

== Awards and honours ==
Byrne Nason was elected a member of the Royal Irish Academy in 2014. She has an honorary doctorate of letters from Maynooth University. She received the Freedom of the Town of Drogheda on 10 January 2020.

In 2022 she received Concern Worldwide's annual Women of Concern Award "in recognition of her outstanding career as a female leader within the diplomatic and civil service and her unwavering dedication to advocating for women's rights at home and abroad".

In 2023 she was made an honorary member of the Drogheda Lions International Club.

== Personal life ==
Byrne Nason is married to Brian Nason, and they have one son.
