= Daniel Mulhall =

Irish diplomat (born 1955)

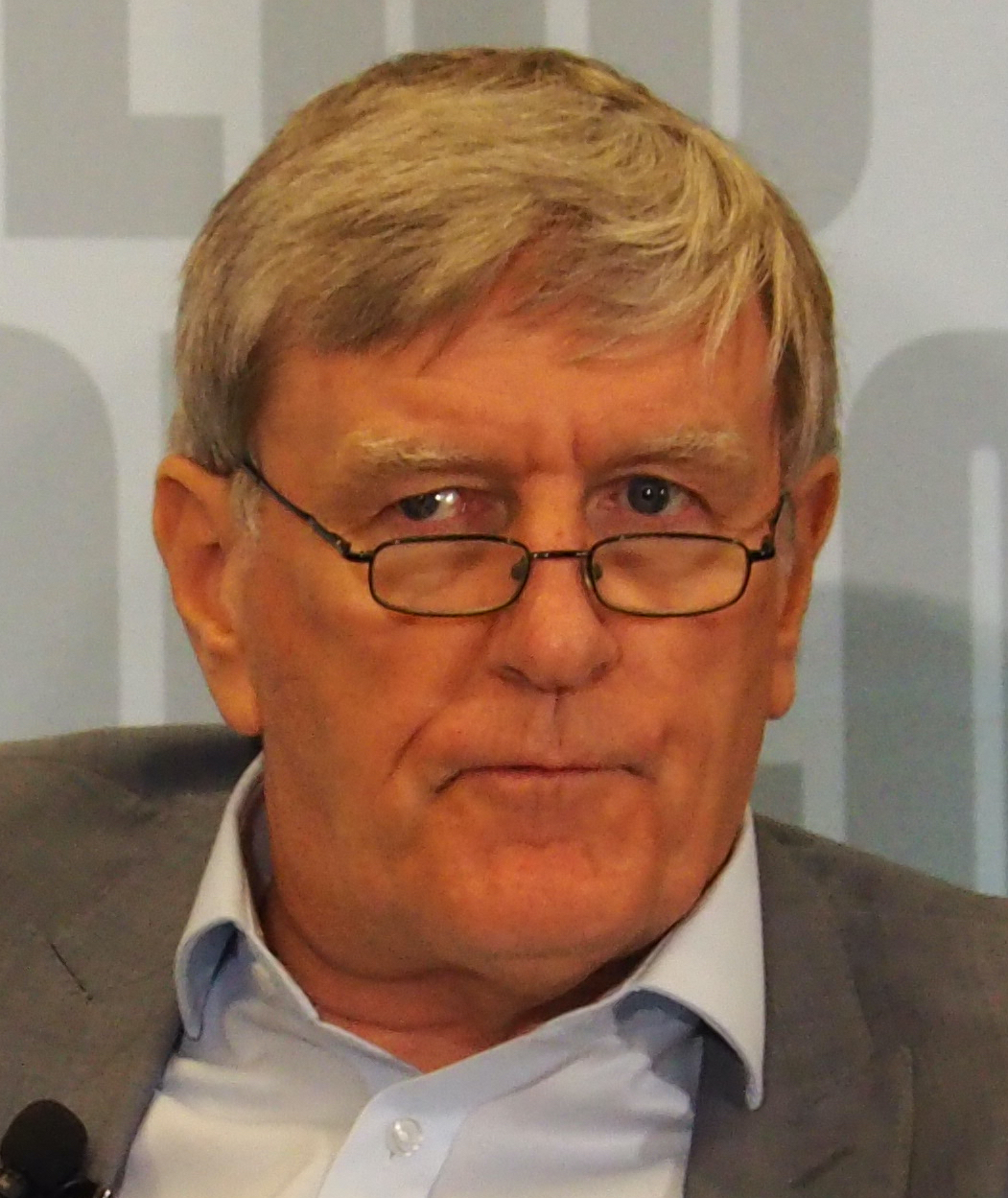
- Mulhall in 2019

Ambassador of Ireland to the United States
- In office 8 September 2017 – August 2022
- President: Michael D. Higgins
- Taoiseach: Leo Varadkar; Micheál Martin
- Preceded by: Anne Anderson
- Succeeded by: Geraldine Byrne Nason

Ambassador of Ireland to the United Kingdom
- In office September 2013 – 22 August 2017
- President: Michael D. Higgins
- Taoiseach: Enda Kenny; Leo Varadkar
- Preceded by: Bobby McDonagh
- Succeeded by: Adrian O'Neill

Ambassador of Ireland to Germany
- In office November 2009 – August 2013
- President: Mary McAleese; Michael D. Higgins
- Taoiseach: Brian Cowen; Enda Kenny
- Preceded by: David Donoghue
- Succeeded by: Michael Collins

Ambassador of Ireland to Malaysia
- In office October 2001 – September 2005
- President: Mary McAleese
- Taoiseach: Bertie Ahern
- Preceded by: Bobby McDonagh
- Succeeded by: Eugene Hutchinson

Personal details
- Born: 8 April 1955 (age 71) Waterford, Ireland
- Citizenship: Irish
- Education: University College Cork

Daniel Mulhall (born 8 April 1955) is a retired Irish diplomat and a former Ambassador of Ireland to the United States. He has also been Ireland's Ambassador to the United Kingdom, Germany and Malaysia.

== Education ==
Born in Waterford, Ireland, Mulhall studied at University College Cork. He received a BA degree in 1975, a Higher Diploma in Education in 1978, and an MA in history in 1979.

== Career ==
Mulhall joined Ireland's Department of Foreign Affairs in 1978 as Third Secretary in the Economics Division. He then moved to the department's Development Cooperation Division, and was later posted in 1980 to the embassy in New Delhi. In 1983, Mulhall moved back to Dublin to work in the Political Division.

Mulhall then became First Secretary at the Embassy of Ireland in Vienna, followed by a posting to the Permanent Representation to the European Union in Brussels in 1990. In 1995, he became Counsellor of the Press Division of the Department of Foreign Affairs. In 1998, he was installed as the first Consul General of Ireland in Edinburgh.

In October 2001, Mulhall was appointed to the post of Ambassador to Malaysia and was also accredited to Laos, Thailand and Vietnam. He was the Irish government's representative during the 2004 Indian Ocean earthquake and tsunami and helped "get survivors home as part of the Irish emergency response efforts". Mulhall returned to Dublin in 2005 as the Assistant Secretary of the European Union Division of the department.

In November 2009, he became Ireland's Ambassador to Germany. His posting to Berlin coincided with the Irish financial crisis.

In 2013, he was posted to the Irish Embassy in London as the Ambassador to the United Kingdom. Mulhall was the Irish Ambassador when the UK voted to leave the European Union in 2016. He campaigned against Brexit, as was Irish government policy, and later spoke of his "personal sadness" that Brexit is "threatening to reverse decades of improving relations since peace was established". He said that Irish-British relations "had been neglected" in the referendum. He called on the British government to remain in the Customs Union "to minimise the impact of Brexit on the Good Friday Agreement".

In March 2017, it was announced that Mulhall would become the 18th Ambassador of Ireland to the United States later that year.

In August 2017, he arrived in Washington DC and presented his credentials to US President Donald Trump when he was officially installed as Ambassador to the US.

In March 2022 New York University announced that after his retirement from the Department of Foreign Affairs in August 2022 Mulhall would become global distinguished professor in Irish studies, teaching an undergraduate seminar, "Literature as History: Ireland 1880-1940".

Mulhall is Parnell Fellow at Magdalene College, Cambridge for 2022–23.

== Awards and honours ==
In July 2017, Mulhall was awarded the Freedom of the City of London.

On 4 March 2019, he was made a freeman of his native city of Waterford.

In November 2019, he was named Honorary President of the Yeats Society.

In 2023 Daniel Mulhall was conferred with the degree of Doctor of the University (D. Univ.) honoris causa by South East Technological University for his work in international diplomacy and literary/historical studies.

== Publications ==
- George Russell — a literary witness to Irish history, History Ireland
- A New Day Dawning: A Portrait of Ireland in 1900, The Collins Press, Cork, 1999
- How the European Union Helped the U.K. and Ireland Move From War to Peace, Time, 2016
- The Shaping of Modern Ireland: A Centenary Assessment, with Eugenio Biagini, Irish Academic Press 2016
- The Emerald Isle Has Friends On Both Sides of the Aisle, Foreign Policy, 2019
- Leopold Bloom, the anti-nationalist star of 'Ulysses', is an ambassador for our day, Washington Post, 2022
- Ulysses: A Reader's Odyssey, New Island Press, 2022
- Pilgrim Soul: W.B. Yeats and the Ireland of His Time, New Island Press, 2023.

Diplomatic posts
| Preceded by Bobby McDonagh | Ambassador of Ireland to Malaysia; 2001–2005 | Succeeded by Eugene Hutchinson |
| Preceded by David Donoghue | Ambassador of Ireland to Germany; 2009–2013 | Succeeded by Michael Collins |
| Preceded by Bobby McDonagh | Ambassador of Ireland to the United Kingdom; 2013–2017 | Succeeded by Adrian O'Neill |
| Preceded by Anne Anderson | Ambassador of Ireland to the United States; 2017–2022 | Succeeded by Geraldine Byrne Nason |
