= Anne Anderson (diplomat) =

Former Ambassador of Ireland (born 1952)

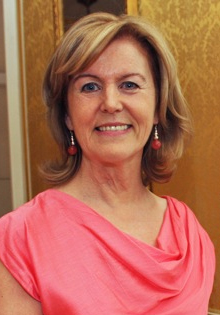
- Anne Anderson in May 2013
- Born: July 1952 (age 73); Clonmel, Ireland
- Education: University College Dublin, Bachelor of Arts (History and Politics); King's Inns, Diploma in Legal Studies
- Occupations: Irish ambassador to: European Union; France; Monaco; United Nations; United States
- Children: Claire Anderson-Wheeler

Anne Anderson (born July 1952) is a former Irish diplomat. She was the 17th ambassador of Ireland to the United States. She has also been Ambassador of Ireland to the United Nations, the European Union, France, and Monaco, the first woman to hold each of these positions.

== Personal life ==
Anderson was born in Clonmel, County Tipperary, in July 1952. Her mother was from County Limerick and her father, who worked in the psychiatric health service, was from County Tipperary. The family moved to Kilkenny when she was eight, and then to Portrane, County Dublin, when she was 11. She graduated from University College Dublin with a Bachelor of Arts degree (history and politics) at the age of 19, in 1972 and from King's Inns, where she earned a diploma in legal studies. She has one adult daughter, Claire Anderson-Wheeler. Anderson is divorced; her partner is Frank Lowe, in New York.

In 2016, she was awarded UCD Alumnus of the Year in Arts and Humanities.

== Career ==
Anderson joined the Irish Department of Foreign Affairs in 1972. She was third secretary and then first secretary in the Department's Economic Division from 1972 to 1976. She moved to Geneva, where she was first secretary of Ireland's Permanent Mission to the United Nations from 1976 to 1980, including a six-month assignment in Belgrade. She was first secretary of the Political Division of the Department of Foreign Affairs from 1980 to 1983.

She moved to the United States, where she was economic attaché at the Embassy of Ireland in Washington, D.C. from 1983 to 1985, and press attaché from 1985 to 1987. Her interest in labour issues developed during this time and her appreciation of American problems and solutions was mentored by Irish American labour leaders Tom Donahue and John Sweeney, lessons she continued to apply during her career. Her daughter, Claire, was born in Washington in 1985.

Back in Ireland, she was Counsellor in the Anglo-Irish Division of the Department of Foreign Affairs from 1987 to 1991, then Assistant Secretary General in Corporate Services from 1991 to 1995. During this time when the Anglo-Irish Agreement was being newly implemented, she worked on fair employment legislation for Northern Ireland, applying to her work lessons learned in the United States about the principles of fair employment.

She returned to Geneva when she was appointed Permanent Representative of Ireland to the United Nations from 1995 to 2001. While there, she was named as chair of the United Nations Commission on Human Rights from 1999 to 2000, the fourth woman to earn the honour (Eleanor Roosevelt was the first). Her term at the commission coincided with former Irish president Mary Robinson's term as United Nations High Commissioner for Human Rights. Anderson was also vice-president of the United Nations Conference on Trade and Development in 1997, and chair of the Trade Policy Review Body at the World Trade Organization.

She moved on to Brussels to act as Permanent Representative of Ireland to the European Union from 2001 to 2005, where she was named Diplomat of the Year by European Voice when she headed the Irish team during Ireland's Presidency of the Council of the European Union in 2004.

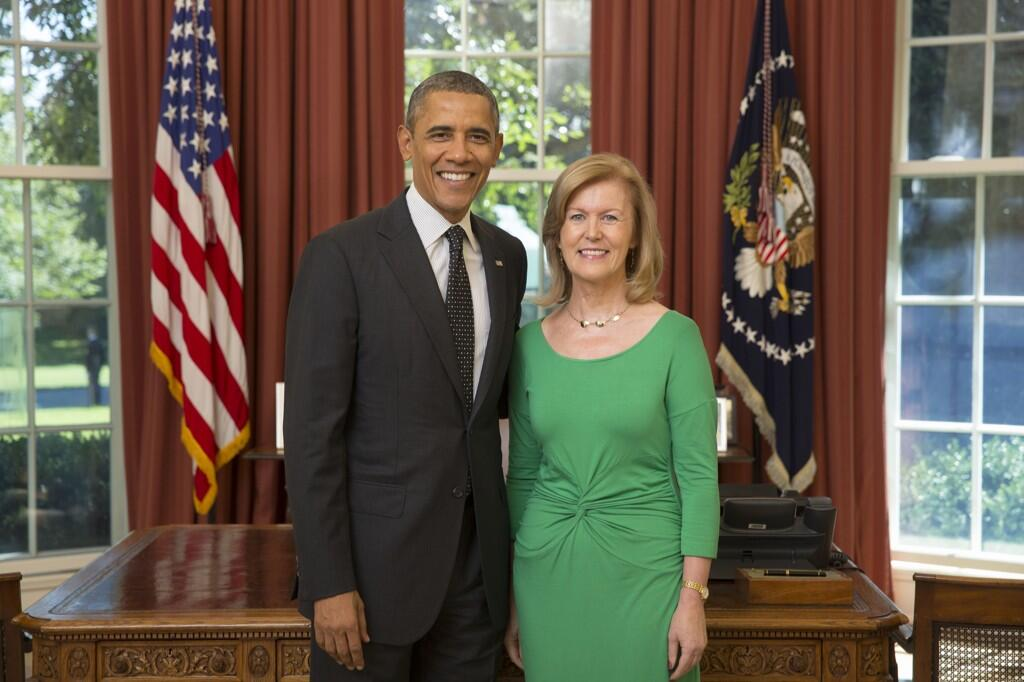
Ambassador of Ireland to the United States, Anne Anderson, with U.S. president, Barack Obama, on 17 September 2013.

Anderson was Ireland's ambassador to France from July 2005 to 2009, and was concurrently the non-resident ambassador to Monaco from January 2007 to 2009. She moved from Paris to New York City when she became Permanent Representative of Ireland to the United Nations from 10 September 2009 to 2013.

She was appointed as the first female ambassador of Ireland to the United States by the Irish government on 15 January 2013. She arrived in Washington, D.C. in August, and presented her credentials to President Barack Obama at a ceremony in the White House Oval Office on 17 September. Anderson's stated agenda during her term in Washington included attention to U.S. immigration reform and its potential for undocumented Irish and other immigrants to achieve legal status. She focussed on economic matters and hoped to increase mutual trade, investment, and tourism between the two countries. She was also interested in exploring and building Ireland's cultural identity in the U.S. context by working with the cultural community.

Anderson retired from the Department of Foreign Affairs on 27 June 2017 and was succeeded as Ireland's US ambassador the following August by Daniel Mulhall. At the invitation of UN Secretary General António Guterres, Anderson subsequently joined his advisory board for the Peacebuilding Fund for 2018/2019; she also currently serves on the board of advisers of the Institute for the Study of Diplomacy at Georgetown University; on the board of directors for the Druid Theatre Company; and as an independent director on the board of directors of Smurfit Kappa. She is the author of Thinking With My Pen: Speeches from a Life in Diplomacy.
