= Mary Whelan =

Irish diplomat

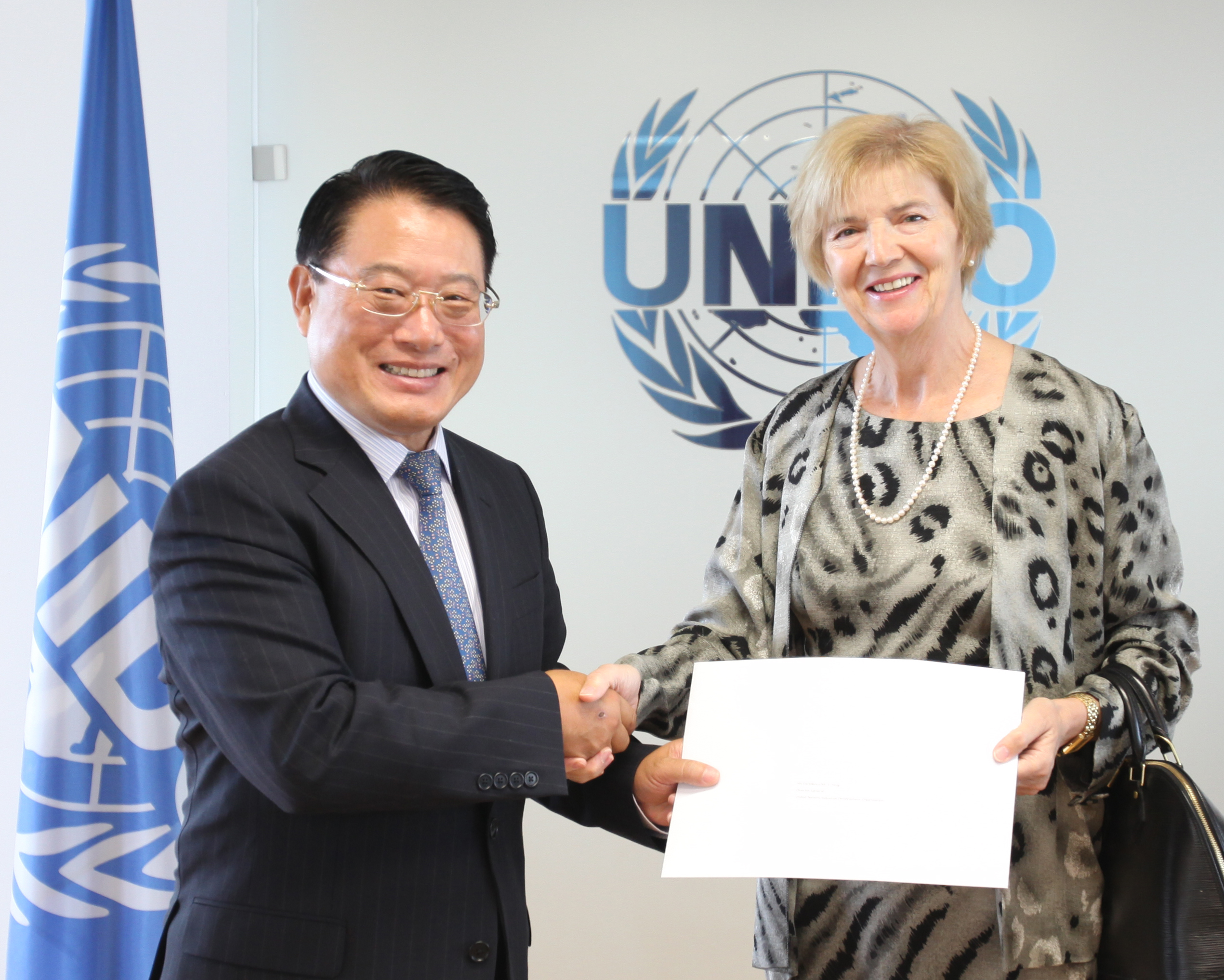
- Mary Whelan, Permanent Representative of Ireland to UNIDO, met the Director General to present her credentials.
- Occupations: Ambassador for Ireland to Britain and Austria
- Spouse: Kevin O’Malley

Mary Whelan became Irish Ambassador to Austria on 2 October 2014.

== Life ==
Whelan graduated with a master's degree in International Contemporary History from the University of Ulster, as well as a master's degree in Strategic Management from Trinity College Dublin, Ireland.

She is married to US Naval Officer Kevin O’Malley and they have two daughters and two granddaughters.

== Career ==
Whelan began her career as Third Secretary in 1973.

Whelan was appointed Permanent Representative of Ireland to the Organisation for the Prohibition of Chemical Weapons (OPCW) on 19 November 2009. She was also Ambassador Extraordinary and Plenipotentiary to the Kingdom of the Netherlands from 2009 at the same time.

While acting as Ireland's Ambassador to Austria Whelan has also been appointed The new Permanent Representative of Ireland to the United Nations Industrial Development Organization (Vienna).

== List of positions ==
- 1973 Third Secretary, Department of Foreign Affairs
- 1974-1976 Third Secretary, Embassy of Ireland, Washington
- 1976-1981 First Secretary, Political Division, Department of Foreign Affairs
- 1981-1985 First Secretary, Personnel Section, Department of Foreign Affairs
- 1985-1990 First Secretary, Permanent Mission of Ireland to the United Nations, Geneva
- 1990-1991 First Secretary, Anglo-Irish Division, Department of Foreign Affairs
- 1991-1993 Counsellor, Economic Division/Foreign Earnings, Department of Foreign Affairs
- 1993-1994 Seconded to the Department of Trade & Tourism
- 1994-1995 Counsellor, Political Division, United Nations and Middle East, Department of Foreign Affairs
- 1995-1998 Director General, Administration and Consular Services Division, Department of Foreign Affairs
- 1998-2001 Director General, Director of Campaign for UN Security Council seat, Department of Foreign Affairs
- 2001-2006 Permanent Representative to the United Nations, Geneva
- 2006-2009 Director General, Promoting Ireland Abroad Division at the Headquarters
- 2009-2014 Ambassador to the Netherlands
