= Michael MacWhite =

Irish diplomat (1883–1958)

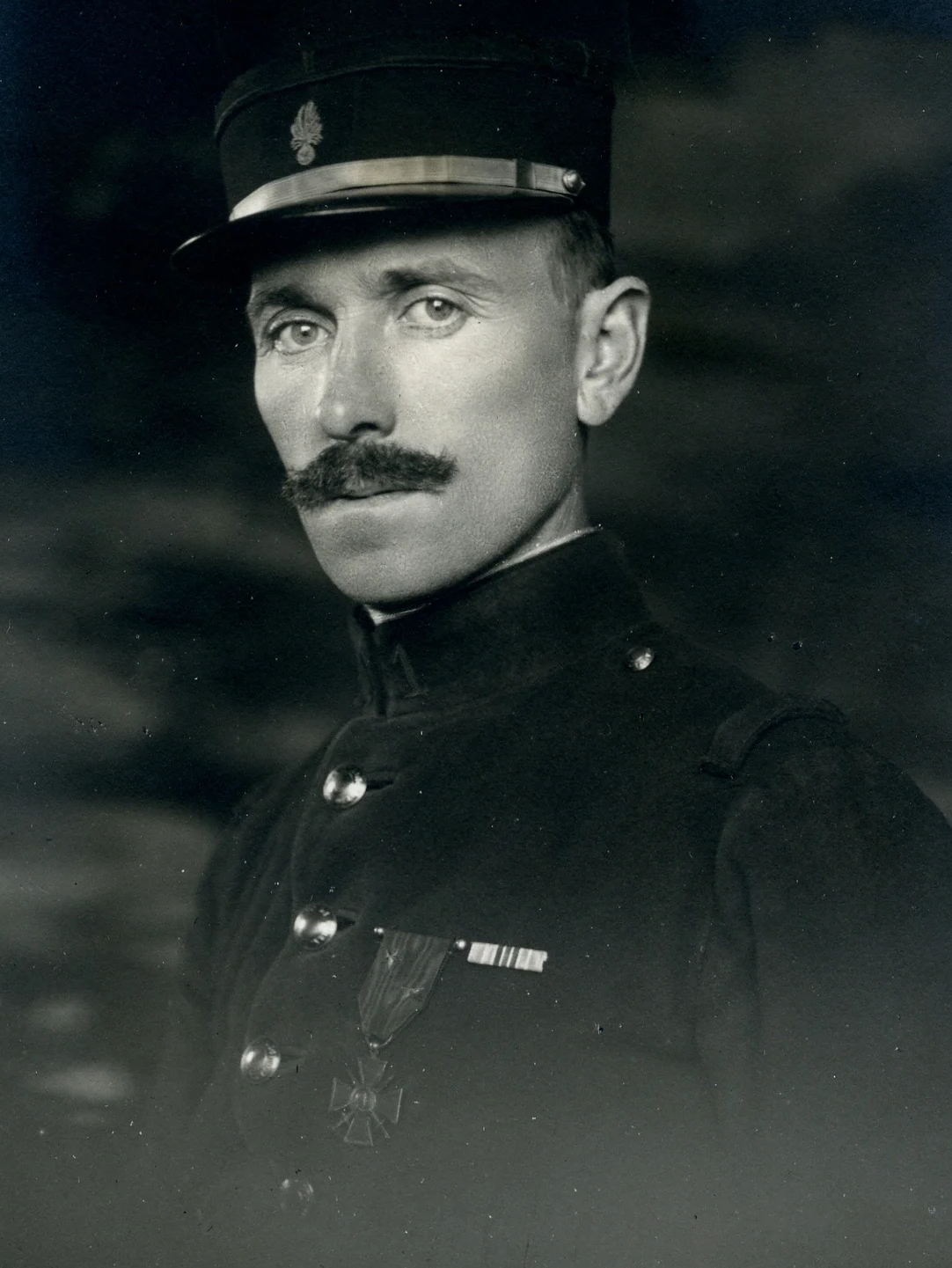
- MacWhite in 1918, in his French Foreign Legion uniform
- Born: May 8, 1883; Reenogreena, Glandore, Co. Cork, Ireland
- Died: November 12, 1958 (aged 75); Dublin, Ireland
- Burial place: Glasnevin Cemetery, Dublin
- Spouse: Paula Asta Gruttner Hillerod (m. 1921)
- Children: 2 (including Eoin MacWhite)
- Military career
- Allegiance: France
- Branch: French Foreign Legion
- Service years: 1913–1918
- Rank: Captain
- Known for: Irish diplomatic service; League of Nations representative
- Battles: First Balkan War; World War I; Arras; Battle of Gallipoli; Macedonia; Serbia
- Awards: Croix de Guerre (×3); Légion d'honneur (Commander); Italian Grand Cordon of the Order of the Crown of Italy
- Other work: Irish Free State representative to Switzerland (1921–1923); Irish Free State delegate to the League of Nations (1923–1929); Irish Free State Minister to the United States (1929–1938); Irish Minister to Italy (1938–1950)

Michael MacWhite (8 May 1883 – 12 November 1958) was an Irish soldier and diplomat. Born in Reenogreena, Glandore, County Cork, he served as a captain in the French Foreign Legion during the First World War, seeing action at Arras, Gallipoli and in Macedonia, and was awarded the Croix de Guerre three times. After the w,ar he offered his services to Dáil Éireann and embarked on a diplomatic career spanning three decades, serving as Irish Free State representative to Switzerland, permanent delegate to the League of Nations, minister to the United States, and minister to Italy. He is regarded as a key figure in establishing Ireland's independent standing in international affairs during the formative years of the Irish Free State.

== Early life ==
MacWhite was born on 8 May 1883 at Reenogreena, Glandore, Co. Cork, the eighth of nine children of John White and Mary McCarthy. He was educated at national schools in Reenogreena and Andfield. In 1900, aged 17 and in the year of his father’s death, he sat the British civil service entrance examinations in Dublin, where he first met Arthur Griffith, beginning a lasting friendship. Although he passed the examinations, he moved to London to work as a bank clerk.

While in London, his interest in Irish nationalism developed. In 1901, he became secretary of the Irish National Club, and in 1903, president of Cumann na nGaedheal in London. He left in 1905 to study Danish agriculture and the co-operative movement in Denmark. On returning, he reported to Griffith and, in 1908, went back to west Cork, where he helped establish Sinn Féin branches in Skibbereen and Dunmanway alongside Seán Mac Diarmada. Griffith remained a strong influence on him throughout.

== Journalism ==
MacWhite worked as a language teacher in Copenhagen and as a newspaper correspondent across Europe. By 1911, he was serving as a continental correspondent for several European newspapers. He was reputed to speak seven languages and travelled widely, reporting on the Second Balkan War and journeying through Turkey and Armenia.

== Military ==
He fought for Bulgaria in the first Balkan War. He then joined the French Foreign Legion, serving in France, Greece and Turkey. He commanded the last French unit to leave Serbia and the first to enter Monastir, where he was badly wounded. He was wounded again at Gallipoli and was awarded the Croix de Guerre three times for bravery in combat. During 1918, he was recalled from the Algerian desert, where he had been serving as a convoy officer for camel caravans, to accompany a French military mission to the United States. At the request of the American government, he undertook a lecture tour to promote Liberty Loans. He returned to Dublin after the Great War and offered his services to the fledgling Dáil Éireann.

== League of Nations ==
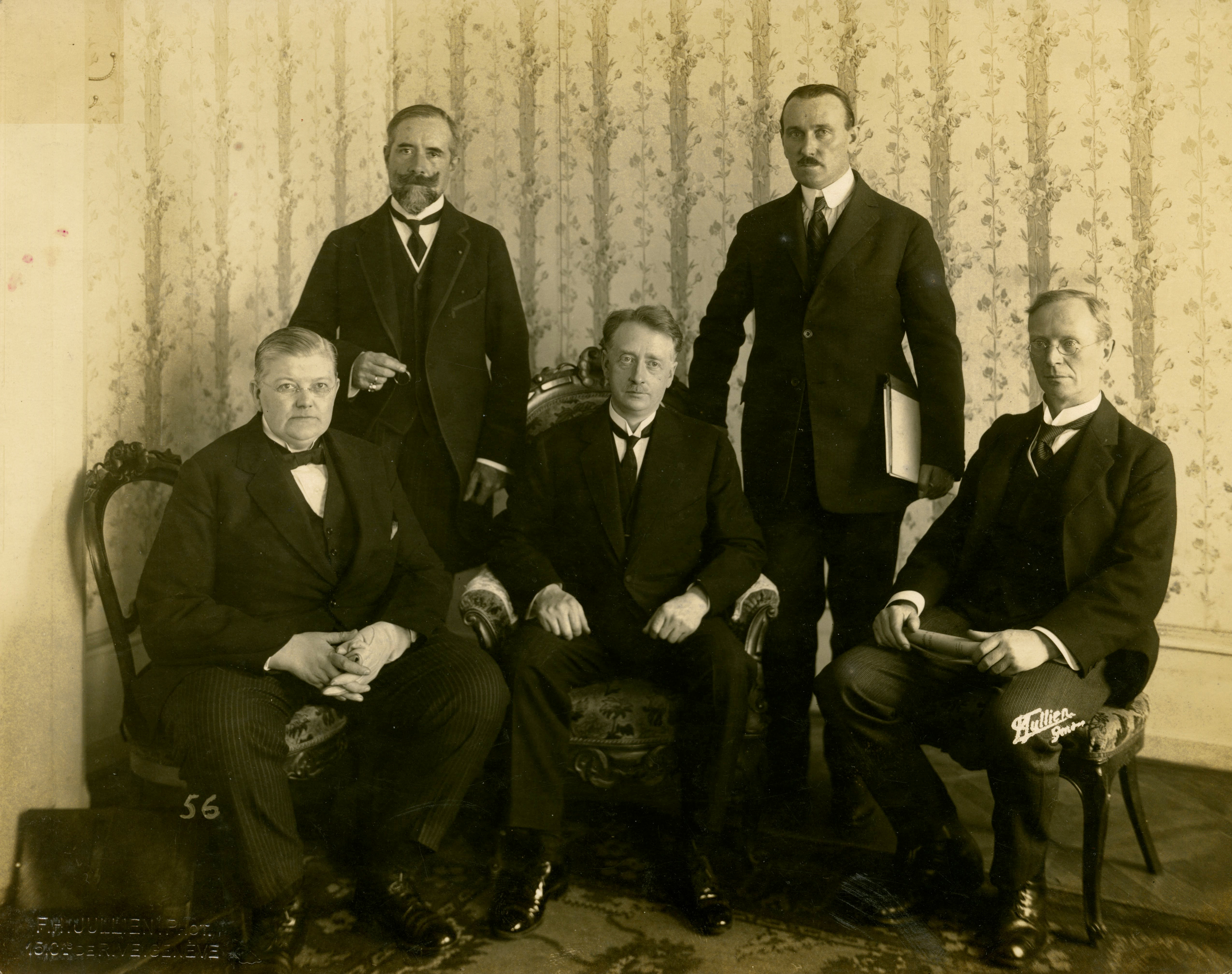
MacWhite (back right) as part of the Irish delegation to the League of Nations in 1923. With him are Eoin MacNeill, William Thomas Cosgrave, Laurence Ginnell, and Hugh Kennedy.

In 1921, MacWhite was sent to Geneva as Dáil Éireann representative at the establishment of the League of Nations, reporting to George Gavan Duffy. This was the beginning of a diplomatic career which would take him across the world during 30 years of service to the Irish State. Operating from an office at 7, Place Claparède in Geneva, he served as the communication link between the League and the nascent State. He was a strong proponent of Irish membership of the League and served as a member of the Irish delegation when the Irish Free State applied to join in 1923. Six weeks before Ireland's admission, MacWhite advised the Minister for External Affairs that all legal and diplomatic documents must henceforth be issued in Irish, English and French, in that order, and that Irish diplomats must travel on Irish passports under no circumstances using British documents. Ireland was admitted to the League on 10 September 1923, with MacWhite subsequently appointed permanent delegate of the Irish Free State to the League. He also handled the registration of the Anglo-Irish Treaty with the League, a step objected to by the UK, which regarded the treaty as an internal arrangement rather than an international agreement between two sovereign states.

== Other postings ==
In January 1929, MacWhite was appointed to succeed Professor Timothy Smiddy as Irish Free State Minister to the United States, arriving in Washington in March of that year. On arrival, he stated that building good commercial relations was the primary purpose of his posting, and he expressed hope that Irish-Americans would support the revival of Irish industry. In 1938, he was posted to Rome, where, as a representative of Ireland, he encountered the hostility of a Fascist government distrustful of foreign diplomats. When the Second World War broke out, MacWhite was responsible for the welfare of Irish citizens living in Rome. He retired in 1950 with the personal rank of Ambassador.

== Personal life ==
MacWhite married Paula Asta Gruttner Hillerod, a Danish painter he first met in Paris while on a mission to Denmark. They had two children. Their son, Eoin MacWhite, was born on the same day that the Irish Free State's application for League of Nations membership was approved, a moment marked by a family tragedy: on the very day of his birth, his infant sister died suddenly. Each member of the Irish delegation attended the infant's funeral in Geneva. Eoin later served in the Irish diplomatic service. The young boy had, by the time of MacWhite's posting to Washington in 1929, already learned both Danish and Irish. Michael MacWhite died in Dublin on 12 November 1958.
