= Ray Bassett =

Irish diplomat

Ray Bassett is an Irish former diplomat. Bassett was born in Dublin and attended O'Connell School. He then attended Trinity College Dublin first earning a B.A. (mod) in biochemistry in 1973 and then a PhD in biochemistry in 1979. He served as an ambassador from Ireland to Canada, Jamaica, and the Bahamas and joint Secretary to the British–Irish Intergovernmental Conference in Belfast before retiring in October 2016.

He is the senior fellow for EU affairs at the centre-right think tank Policy Exchange. He is also the author of Brexit: Options for the Border and Brexit and the Border. In 2020 Bassett published a book, Ireland and the EU Post Brexit, which was sharply critical of Ireland's former Taoiseach Leo Varadkar. Bassett alleged that Varadkar "had done everything in his power to thwart the democratic outcome in the UK [the Brexit vote in 2016] ... The gamble failed and Ireland is now facing a very difficult situation ... Opposing a fair deal for the UK was never in Ireland's interests. It was a huge blunder."

He is not involved with any political party and has addressed groups from the far-right Irish Freedom Party, mainstream political groups, and the Communist Party of Ireland on the left.

He was an unsuccessful candidate in the 2022 Dublin University by-election.
