= David J. Cooney =

Irish civil servant and diplomat (born 1954)

David J. Cooney (born 29 April 1954) is an Irish diplomat.

Born in London, he holds a BA in Politics and History from Keele University, and has held a number of senior diplomatic posts. From 1974 until 1979 he worked in the Department of Agriculture. Since then he has worked for the Foreign Ministry. He assisted in the talks leading to the Belfast Agreement, being named by George Mitchell as one of the two "unsung heroes of the peace process". He has also served as Ambassador to the United Nations, and most recently the United Kingdom. In December 2008 it was announced that Cooney would become Secretary-General at the Department of Foreign Affairs in January 2009, replacing Dermot Gallagher.

In 2009 Cooney received an honorary doctorate from Keele University.

In January 2012 Cooney presented his credentials to Pope Benedict XVI as the first non residential Irish ambassador to the Holy See.

In September 2014, he presented his credentials to King Felipe VI as the new Irish ambassador to Spain.
