= Richard Ryan (diplomat) =

Irish poet & diplomat (born 1946)

Richard Ryan (born 1946) is an Irish poet and former diplomat.

Born in 1946 and educated in Dublin, he was an English professor and visiting poet at the University of St. Thomas, Minnesota, United States from 1970 to 1971, and published two volumes of poetry in the early 1970s. In 1974 he joined the Irish diplomatic service.

In the 1980s he served as counsellor in the Irish Embassy in London where, according to Garret FitzGerald, he did very useful work in the run up to the Anglo-Irish Agreement. One of his talents was that he was an excellent shot. This gave him a ready entrée to several segments of British society, including important sections of the Tory party. His role was to influence a wide range of MPs, particularly Conservatives, in favour of Irish policy. In Fitzgerald's words, he did Trojan work "dining for Ireland", and helped to ensure that when Margaret Thatcher eventually came to sound out whether an agreement along the lines Ireland was seeking was "saleable" to her party, she would receive a positive response.

He served as Irish ambassador to Korea (1989–93), Japan and Spain (1994–98) before becoming Ireland's permanent representative to the United Nations from 1998 until 2005. In that role he played an important part in securing a seat for Ireland as a non-permanent member of the Security Council ( 2001–2002).

He was also ambassador to the Czech Republic between 2009 and 2011. He later served as Irish ambassador to the Netherlands.

== Publications ==
- Ledges, Dolmen Press, 1970
- Ravenswood, Dolmen Press, 1974
- Book chapter, Building Westminster Commitment to the Good Friday Agreement, in Brokering the Good Friday Agreement: The Untold Story, Ed. Mary Daly, Royal Irish Academy. (2019)
