= John Hearne (lawyer) =

Irish legal scholar and diplomat

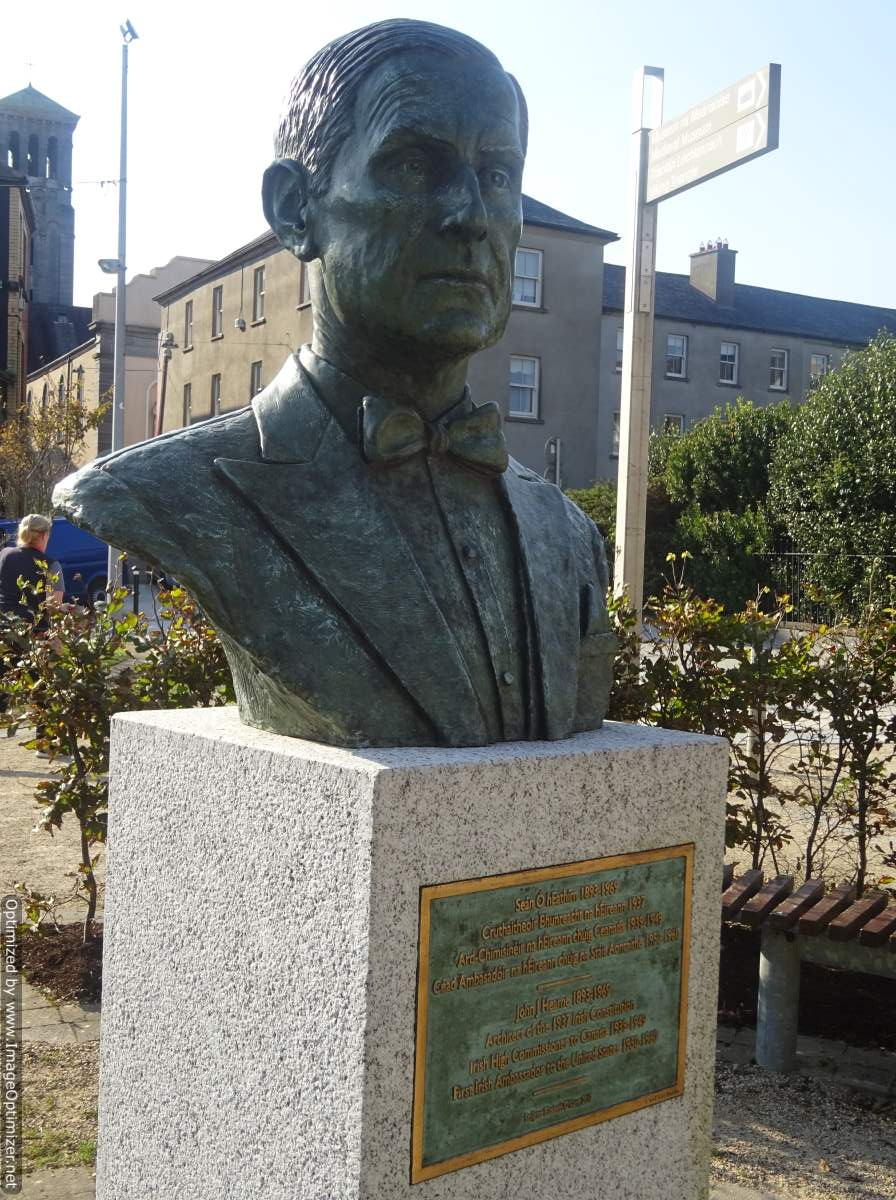
- Born: John Joseph Hearne; 1 June 1893; Waterford, Ireland
- Died: 29 March 1969 (aged 75); Dublin, Ireland
- Education: Waterpark College
- Alma mater: Maynooth University (BA); University College Dublin (LLB); King's Inns (BL)
- Occupations: Barrister; Diplomat; Academic

John Joseph Hearne (Irish: Seán Ó hEathirn; 1 June 1893 – 29 March 1969) was an Irish barrister, academic and diplomat who was referred to as "Ireland's Thomas Jefferson" for his role in the drafting of the 1937 Constitution of Ireland. He was also the first Ambassador of Ireland to the United States.

== Early life ==
Hearne was the youngest son of Alderman Richard Hearne, a member of the Irish Parliamentary Party, who twice served as Mayor of Waterford, and Alice Mary Hearne (née Power). His older brother Canon Maurice Hearne served as parish priest in Cahir, County Tipperary.

He attended Waterpark College (Christian Brothers). He went to train for the priesthood at St. John's College, Waterford transferring in 1911 to Maynooth College after a year. In Maynooth, he completed a BA degree in Arts and Philosophy from National University of Ireland, later enrolling in a Theology Degree which he did not complete. He left in 1916 having decided not to become a priest, and studied for the degree of barrister at law at the King's Inns. He also studied law at University College Dublin, where he was awarded an LLB Degree.

== Career ==
=== Legal career ===
In 1937, during the government of Éamon de Valera, he was working as a legal expert in the Department of External Affairs when de Valera called on him to assist in the writing of the new Irish constitution, which would replace the 1922 Constitution of the Irish Free State. With Maurice Moynihan, Hearne drew up the first draft of the constitution; according to Moynihan, Hearne had been instrumental in convincing de Valera that a new constitution was necessary in the first place. The exact role of Hearne is not evident from the remaining documents; it is not clear who actually wrote the first draft, and according to the Irish historian J. J. Lee, "Much remains to be uncovered about the planning and drafting of the constitution, including not least the roles of John Hearne, the legal adviser to External Affairs, and of Maurice Moynihan."

=== Diplomatic career ===
After his legal career, Hearne filled a number of diplomatic positions. In 1939, he was appointed High Commissioner to Canada. In March 1950, he became the first Irish ambassador to the United States, and was welcomed in Boston on 13 May 1950. It was Hearne who began the tradition of presenting a bowl of shamrock to the sitting U.S. President at the White House on St Patrick's Day. In 1954, he gave the commencement address at Boston College, and on that occasion was awarded with an honorary degree. In 1960, after retiring from the diplomatic service, he became a legislative consultant to Nigeria and Ghana, which had recently acquired independence, albeit within the Commonwealth.

He died in Dublin in 1969. On the occasion of the 70th anniversary of the Irish constitution, Hearne's birthplace (8 William Street in Waterford) was marked with a tribute.

A bust of Hearne by Elizabeth O'Kane was unveiled in his native Waterford on 3 July 2017 on the 80th anniversary of the constitution. There is a replica in the Irish Embassy, Washington, D.C., and a replica stands in the garden of Iveagh House, headquarters of the Irish Department of Foreign Affairs.

A biography of Hearne, "John Hearne: Architect of the 1937 Constitution of Ireland" by Eugene Broderick was published in 2017.
