= McDonagh =

Irish surname

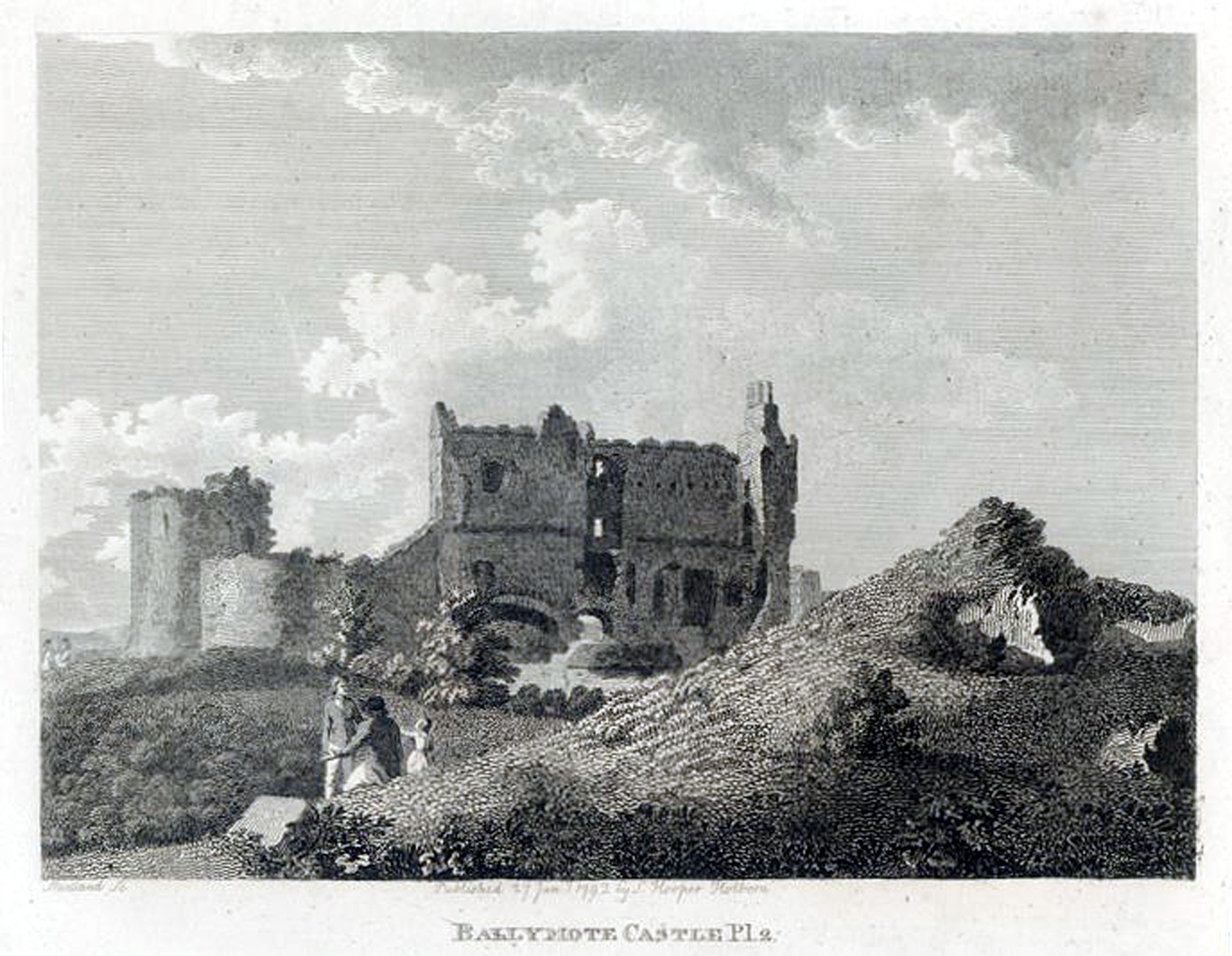
Ballymote Castle, Sligo, Ireland: Parent house / Connachta (Uí Briúin Ai) becoming Mac Diarmada; Country / Kingdom of Connacht; Founded / 1315; Founder / Donnchadh Mac Diarmada

McDonagh, also commonly spelled MacDonagh, is a surname of Irish origin. It derives from the Irish Gaelic Mac Dhonnchadha, literally translating to "Son of the brown warrior".

Earlier and original variants include Mac Dhonnchadha, Mac Donnchadha, Mac Donnacha, Mac Donnchaidh and Mac Donnacha.

== Naming conventions ==
Male	Daughter	Wife (Long)	Wife (Short)
Mac Donnchadha	Nic Dhonnchadha	Bean Mhic Dhonnchadha	Mhic Dhonnchadha

== Early history ==
Tomaltach na Cairge mac Diarmata (Tomaltach of the rock) was the King of Moylurg from 1197 until his death in 1207. One of Tomaltach's sons, Donnchadh, was the progenitor of the MacDonagh sept. The family later became Kings or Lords of the túath of Tír Olliol and Corran now the barony of Tirreril in Co. Sligo.

The first to be known as Mac Donnchadha was Tomaltach Mac Donnchadh, Donnchadh MacDermot's grandson, alive in 1309. Tomaltach Mac Donnchadh and his men fought with Aedh Breifneeh O'Conchobhair (Hugh the Breifnian) defeating in battle Aedh Ó Conchobair, King of Connacht for control of the Three Tuathas.

== Notable people with the surname McDonagh or MacDonagh ==
- Bob McDonagh (1924–2015), Irish diplomat
- Bobby McDonagh (born 1954), Irish diplomat, son of Bob McDonagh
- Brendan McDonagh, managing director of the National Asset Management Agency in Ireland
- Charlotte McDonagh (born 1984), British actress
- Donagh MacDonagh (1912–1968), Irish writer and judge (son of Thomas below)
- Eileen MacDonagh (born 1956), Irish sculptor
- Enda McDonagh (1930–2021), Irish priest of the Catholic Church
- Francesca McDonagh (born 1974/75), Irish-British banker
- Isabella Mercia McDonagh (1899–1982), also known as Marie Lorraine, Australian actress
- Jacko McDonagh (born 1962), Irish professional footballer
- Jarlath McDonagh (born 1945), Irish politician
- Jay McDonagh (born 1973), American football player
- Jamie McDonagh (born 1996), Northern Irish professional footballer
- Jim McDonagh (born 1952), nicknamed Seamus, goalkeeping coach at Aston Villa
- Joe McDonagh (1953–2016), 32nd President of the Gaelic Athletic Association
- John MacDonagh (1880–1961), Irish film director (brother of Thomas MacDonagh)
- John Michael McDonagh (born 1967), English-born Irish screenwriter and film director
- Joseph MacDonagh (1883–1922), Irish Sinn Féin politician (brother of Thomas)
- Oliver MacDonagh (1924–2002), professor of Irish history who made a particular study of the historic relationship between Ireland and the United Kingdom
- Maitland McDonagh, American film critic and the author of several books about cinema
- Margaret McDonagh, Baroness McDonagh (1961–2023), British Labour Party politician, general secretary of the Labour Party from 1998 to 2001 (sister of Siobhain)
- Martin McDonagh (born 1970), English-born Irish playwright and film director
- Bill McDonagh (1928–2019), Canadian ice hockey player
- Michael MacDonagh (1698–1746), Irish Roman Catholic prelate who served as the Bishop of Kilmore from 1728 to 1746
- Mike McDonagh, Irish humanitarian and United Nations official working for the United Nations Office for the Coordination of Humanitarian Affairs
- Monika MacDonagh-Pajerová (born 1966), Czech academic
- Pat McDonagh (disambiguation), multiple people
- Patrick McDonagh (1906–?), Scottish footballer
- Paulette McDonagh (1901–1978), Australian film director
- Peter McDonagh (born 1977), Irish boxer
- Philip McDonagh (born 1952), Irish poet and former diplomat
- Phyllis McDonagh (1900–1978), Australian film producer, production designer and journalist
- Ryan McDonagh (born 1989), American ice hockey defenceman
- Siobhain McDonagh (born 1960), British Labour Member of Parliament for the Mitcham and Morden constituency in London (sister of Margaret)
- Stephen McDonagh (born 1970), Irish hurler
- Seamus McDonagh (boxer), American actor, screenwriter and filmmaker, and former boxer
- Terence MacDonagh (1908–1986), English oboe player, nephew to Thomas MacDonagh below and first cousin to Donagh MacDonagh above
- Thomas MacDonagh (1878–1916), Irish nationalist poet, playwright, and a leader of the 1916 Easter Rising
- Willo McDonagh (born 1983), Irish footballer

== Stage name ==
- JD McDonagh, ring name of Irish wrestler Jordan Devlin (born 1990)

== Fictional characters ==
- Blane McDonnagh, the rich kid in the film Pretty in Pink, portrayed by Andrew McCarthy
- Terence McDonagh, police sergeant in the film Bad Lieutenant: Port of Call New Orleans, portrayed by Nicolas Cage
- Sgt. Jo McDonagh, army sergeant in the British TV series Red Cap (TV series), portrayed by Tamzin Outhwaite
