= Robert McDonagh =

Robert McDonagh or Bob McDonagh may refer to:

- Bob McDonagh (1924–2015), Irish diplomat
- Bobby McDonagh (born 1954), Irish diplomat, son of Bob McDonagh
- Bob McDonagh (rugby league) (fl. 1950s), Australian rugby league player with the Sydney Roosters

== See also ==
- Bob McDonogh (1900–1945), American racing driver
- Bob McDonough (born 1963), American football defensive back
