= Traditional English pronunciation of Latin =

The traditional English pronunciation of Latin, and Classical Greek words borrowed through Latin, is the way the Latin language was traditionally pronounced by speakers of English until the early 20th century. Although this pronunciation is no longer taught in Latin classes, it is still broadly used in the fields of biology, law, and medicine.

In the Middle Ages speakers of English, from Middle English onward, pronounced Latin not as the ancient Romans did, but in the way that had developed among speakers of French, reflecting Latin regional pronunciation. This traditional pronunciation then became closely linked to the pronunciation of English, and as the pronunciation of English changed with time, the English pronunciation of Latin changed as well.

Until the beginning of the 19th century all English speakers used this pronunciation, including Roman Catholics for liturgical purposes. Following Catholic emancipation in Britain in 1829 and the subsequent Oxford Movement, newly converted Catholics preferred the Italianate pronunciation, which became the norm for the Catholic liturgy. Meanwhile, scholarly proposals were made for a reconstructed Classical pronunciation, close to the pronunciation used in the late Roman Republic and early Empire, and with a more transparent relationship between spelling and pronunciation.

One immediate audible difference between the pronunciations is in the treatment of vowels. The English pronunciation of Latin applied vowel sound changes which had occurred within English itself, where stressed vowels in a word became quite different from their unstressed counterpart. In the other two pronunciations of Latin, vowel sounds were not changed. Among consonants, for example, the treatment of the letter c followed by a front vowel was one clear distinction. That is, the name Cicero is pronounced in English as /ˈsɪsəroʊ/ SISS-ər-oh, in Ecclesiastical Latin as [ˈtʃitʃero], and in restored Classical Latin as [ˈkɪkɛroː].

The competition between the three pronunciations grew towards the end of the 19th century. By the beginning of the 20th century, however, a consensus for change had developed. The Classical Association, shortly after its foundation in 1903, put forward a detailed proposal for a reconstructed classical pronunciation. This was supported by other professional and learned bodies. Finally in February 1907 their proposal was officially recommended by the Board of Education. Adoption of the "new pronunciation" was a long, drawn-out process, but by the mid-20th century, classroom instruction in the traditional English pronunciation of Latin had generally ceased, except to the extent that the normal English pronunciations of biology vocabulary and medical vocabulary are acquired incidentally by students in biology education, medical school, nursing school, and dental school (and the front matter of some medical dictionaries still provides a key to it for learners). Traditional English pronunciation is still common in legal Latin and in specific places such as Westminster School.

== Illustrative survivals ==
The traditional pronunciation survives in academic and general English vocabulary:

- In a very large body of words used every day: album, apex, area, asylum, axis, basis, bonus, camera, census, cinema, circus, crisis, dilemma, error, focus, genesis, genius, hypothesis, icon, insignia, item, junior, major, medium, minor, murmur, onus, panacea, podium, ratio, sector, stamina, terminus, trivia; as well as such common phrases as ad infinitum, et cetera, non sequitur, quid pro quo, status quo, vice versa
- In academic vocabulary: campus, syllabus, curriculum, diploma, alumnus
- In anatomical vocabulary: aorta, biceps, cranium, patella, penis, sinus, vertebra, vagina
- In astronomical nomenclature, including the names of planets, moons, asteroids, stars and constellations: Mars, Io, Ceres, Sirius, Ursa Major, nova, nebula, although non-traditional pronunciations have become established in some cases (traditional /ˈlaɪbrə/ for Libra is less common than /ˈliːbrə/)
- In many biblical names: Ananias, Cornelius, Felix, Jesus, Judas, Lydia, Nicodemus, Nicolas, Priscilla, Sergius, Silas, Titus, Zacharias
- In a number of historical terms and names, particularly those associated with Greek or Roman culture and politics: augur, bacchanal, consul, fibula, lictor, prætor, toga, Augustus, Cæsar, Cicero, Diocletian, Hypatia, Plato, Socrates, Trajan
- In legal terminology and phrases: affidavit, alibi, alias, de jure, obiter dictum, sub judice, subpoena. However, some speakers use Classical pronunciation for some of these phrases.
- In the specialized terminology of literary studies: codex, colophon, epitome, index, periphrasis, parenthesis
- In some mathematical terms: calculus, parabola, hyperbola, isosceles, rhombus, vector
- In medical terminology describing diseases, symptoms and treatments: anaesthesia, bacterium, coma, lumbago, mucus, nausea, ophthalmia, rabies, tetanus, virus, rigor mortis
- In words and names from classical mythology: Achilles, Argus, Calliope, Gorgon, Myrmidon, Sphinx
- In many place names: Carolina, Judæa, Annapolis, Dalmatia, Ithaca, Nicæa, Pennsylvania, Romania, Salina, Virginia
- In some religious terms: Angelus, basilica, Magi, martyr, presbyter
- In many saints' names: Athanasius, Eugenia, Eusebius, Ignatius, Irene, Januarius, Leo, Macarius, Marcella, Theophilus
- In certain sporting terms: gymnasium, stadium, discus, pentathlon
- In taxonomic and other biological terminology: phylum, genus, species, chrysanthemum, hibiscus, rhododendron, foetus, larva, ovum, pupa, chameleon, lemur, platypus

== Vowel length and stress ==
The English pronunciation of Classical words and names is generally predictable from the orthography, as long as the placement of stress is known as well. However, predicting the place of stress in words of more than two syllables usually requires knowing which vowels in the word were long and which were short in Classical Latin (not to be confused with the so-called "long" and "short" pronunciations of the vowels in traditional English pronunciation itself, which are discussed in detail below). For Latin, Latinized Greek or for long versus short α, ι, υ Greek vowels, this means that macrons must be used if the pronunciation is to be unambiguous. However, the conventions of biological nomenclature forbid the use of these diacritics, and in practice they are not found in astronomical names or in literature. Without this information, it may not be possible to ascertain the placement of stress, and therefore the pronunciation of the vowels in English.

Note that the following rules are generalizations, and that many names have well-established idiosyncratic pronunciations.

=== Stress placement ===
Latin stress is predictable. It falls on the penultimate syllable when that is "heavy", and on the antepenultimate syllable when the penult is "light".

In Greek, stress is not predictable, but it may be ignored when pronouncing Greek borrowings, as they have been filtered through Latin and have acquired the stress patterns of Latin words.

A syllable is "light" if it ends in a single short vowel. For example, a, ca, sca, scra are all light syllables for the purposes of Latin stress assignment.

Any other syllable is "heavy":

- if it is closed (ended) by a consonant: an, can, scan, scran
- if the vowel is long or a diphthong in Latin, or in the Latin transliteration of Greek: ā, cā, scā, scrā (a long vowel) or æ, cæ, scæ, scræ (a diphthong).

Latin diphthongs may be written ⟨æ⟩ or ⟨ae⟩, ⟨œ⟩ or ⟨oe⟩. Long vowels are written with a macron: ā ē ī ō ū ȳ, though this is a modern convention. Greek long vowels are ει, η, ου, ω, sometimes ι, υ, and occasionally α. (Long α is uncommon.) For example, Actaeon is pronounced /ækˈtiːɒn/ ak-TEE-on or /ækˈtiːən/ ak-TEE-ən. A diaeresis indicates that the vowels do not form a diphthong: Arsinoë /ɑːrˈsɪnoʊiː/ ar-SIN-oh-ee (not *AR-sin-ee).

The importance of marking long vowels for Greek words can be illustrated with Ixion, from Greek Ἰξίων. As it is written, the English pronunciation might be expected to be */ˈɪksiɒn/ IK-see-on. However, length marking, Ixīōn, makes it clear that it should be pronounced /ɪkˈsaɪɒn/ ik-SY-on.

When a consonant ends a word, or when more than a single consonant follows a vowel within a word, the syllable is closed and therefore heavy. (A consonant is not the same thing as a letter. The letters x [ks] and z [dz] each count as two consonants, but th [θ], ch [k], and ph [f] count as one, as the pronunciations in brackets indicate.) The English letter j was originally an i, forming a diphthong with the preceding vowel, so it forces the stress just as æ, œ, z, and x do.

- Exception: a consonant cluster of p, t, or c/k plus l or r is ambiguous. The preceding syllable was open in ordinary Latin. However, when a different stress placement was required by poetic meter, it could be treated as closed. Thus the name Chariclo (Chariklō) could be syllabified as either cha-ri-klō, with an open penult and stress on the cha (normal Latin), or cha-rik-lō, with a closed penult and stress on the rik (an optional poetic pronunciation), so both /ˈkærɪkloʊ/ KARR-ik-loh and /kəˈrɪkloʊ/ kə-RIK-loh are acceptable pronunciations in English.

==== Secondary stress ====
If more than two syllables precede the stressed syllable, the same rules determine which is stressed. For example, in Cassiopeia (also Cassiopēa), syllabified cas-si-o-pei-a, the penult pei/pē contains a long vowel/diphthong and is therefore stressed. The second syllable preceding the stress, si, is light, so the stress must fall one syllable further back, on cas (which coincidentally happens to be a closed syllable and therefore heavy). Therefore, the standard English pronunciation is /ˌkæsiəˈpiːə, -sioʊ-/ KAS-ee-ə-PEE-ə, -see-oh-. (Note however that this word also has an irregular pronunciation in English: /ˌkæsiˈoʊpiə/ KAS-ee-OH-pee-ə.)

=== Long and short vowels ===
Whether a vowel letter is pronounced "long" in English (/eɪ, iː, aɪ, oʊ, juː/) or "short" (/æ, ɛ, ɪ, ɒ, ʌ/) is unrelated to the length of the original Latin or Greek vowel. Instead it depends on position and stress. A vowel followed by a consonant at the end of a word is short in English, except that final -es is always long, as in Pales /ˈpeɪliːz/ PAY-leez. In the middle of a word, a vowel followed by more than one consonant is short, as in Hermippe /hərˈmɪpi/ hər-MIP-ee, while a vowel with no following consonant is long. However, when a vowel is followed by a single consonant (or by a cluster of p, t, c/k plus l, r) and then another vowel, it gets more complicated.

- If the syllable is unstressed, it is open, and the vowel is often reduced to schwa.
- If the penultimate syllable is stressed, it is open and the vowel long, as in Europa /jʊəˈroʊpə/ yoor-OH-pə.
- If any other syllable is stressed, it is closed and the vowel is short, as in Ganymede /ˈɡænɪmiːd/ GAN-im-eed and Anaxagoras /ˌænəkˈsæɡərəs/ AN-ək-SAG-ər-əs.

Regardless of position, stressed u stays long before a single consonant (or a cluster of p, t, c/k plus l, r), as in Jupiter /ˈdʒuːpɪtər/ JOO-pit-ər.

- Exception: A stressed nonhigh vowel (a, e, o) stays long before a single consonant (or cluster of p, t, c/k plus l, r) followed by an /i/ or /iː/ ee sound (e, i, y) plus another vowel at the end of a word: Proteus /ˈproʊtiəs/ PROH-tee-əs, Demetrius /dɪˈmiːtriəs/ dim-EE-tree-əs. This is because, historically and regionally, in many of these words the e, i, y is pronounced /j/ y and combines with the following syllable, so that the preceding syllable is penultimate and therefore open: /ˈproʊtjuːs/ PROH-tyooss.

Traditionally, English syllables have been described as 'open' when their vowel (in English) is long and they are followed by a single consonant followed by another vowel, and as 'closed' in the same environment when their vowel is short. However, it is debated how accurate this analysis is, as in English syllables tend to attract a following consonant, especially when they are stressed, so that all stressed syllables followed by a consonant are arguably 'closed'. Such following consonants are sometimes described as ambisyllabic. This effect is especially apparent in some dialects, such as RP, when the consonant in question is /r/, which affects the quality of the preceding vowel. None of this changes the patterns described in this article: The long-short distinction described above is maintained regardless. For example, the 'e' in Hera is long regardless of whether it is pronounced /ˈhiːrə/ or /ˈhɪərə/ in a particular dialect, or analyzed as open HEE-rə or as closed HEER-ə. American dictionaries tend to follow the former transcription, and British dictionaries the latter, so when the consonant 'r' is involved the rules for the English pronunciation of Latin words are more straightforward when using the conventions of American dictionaries.

== Alphabet ==
Anglo-Latin includes all of the letters of the English alphabet except w, viz.: a b c d e f g h i j k l m n o p q r s t u v x y z. It differs from Classical Latin in distinguishing i from j and u from v. In addition to these letters, the digraphs æ and œ may be used (as in Cæsar and phœnix). These two digraphs respectively represent mergers of the letters ae and oe (diphthongs, as are Greek αι and οι) and are often written that way (e.g., Caesar, phoenix). However, since in Anglo-Latin both ae and oe represent a simple vowel, not a diphthong, the use of the single letters æ and œ better represents the reality of Anglo-Latin pronunciation. Despite being written with two letters, the Greek sequences ch, ph, rh, th represent single sounds. The letters x and Greek z, on the other hand, are sequences of two sounds (being equivalent to cs and dz).

=== Conversion of Greek to Latin ===
Anglo-Latin includes a large amount of Greek vocabulary; in principle, any Greek noun or adjective can be converted into an Anglo-Latin word. There is a conventional set of equivalents between the letters of the Greek and Roman alphabets, which differs in some respects from the current mode of Romanizing Greek. This is laid out in the tables below:

Vowels											Diphthongs						
Greek letter	α		ε	η	ι		ο	υ		ω	αι	ει	οι	υι	αυ	ευ	ου
Romanization	a	ā	e	ē	i	ī	o	u	ū	ō	ai	ei	oi	ui	au	eu	ou
Conversion to Latin	a	ā	e	ē	i	ī	o	y	ȳ	ō	æ	ī	œ	yi	au	eu	ū

Consonants
Greek letter	ʻ	β	γ	γγ	γκ	γξ	γχ	δ	ζ	θ	κ	λ	μ	ν	ξ	π	ρ	ῤ	ῥ	ῤῥ	σ	ς	τ	φ	χ	ψ
Romanization	h	b	g	gg	gk	gx	gch	d	z	th	k	l	m	n	x	p	r		hr	rhr	s		t	ph	ch	ps
Conversion to Latin	h	b	g	ng	nc	nx	nch	d	z	th	c	l	m	n	x	p	r		rh	rrh	s		t	ph	ch	ps

Rh is used for Greek ρ at the beginnings of words, e.g. ῥόμβος (rhombos) > rhombus. Rarely (and mostly in words relatively recently adapted from Greek), k is used to represent Greek κ. In such cases it is always pronounced [k] and never [s] (as it might be if spelled c) : e.g. σκελετός (skeletos) > skeleton not "sceleton".

Greek accent marks and breath marks, other than the "rough breathing" (first in the list of consonants above), are entirely disregarded; the Greek pitch accent is superseded by a Latin stress accent, which is described below.

Frequently, but not universally, certain Greek nominative endings are changed to Latin ones that cannot be predicted from the tables above. Occasionally forms with both endings are found in Anglo-Latin, for instance Latinized hyperbola next to Greek hyperbole. The most usual equations are found below:

Endings
Greek ending	-η	-εια	-ον	-ειον	-ος	-ρος after a consonant	-ειος
Romanization	-ē	-eia	-on	-eion	-os	-ros	-eios
Latin ending	-ā	-ēa -īa	-um	-ēum -īum	-us	-er	-ēus -īus

Examples:

- Greek ἄγγελος (aggelos) > Latin angelus (γγ > ng, -ος > us)
- Greek ἔλλειψις (elleipsis) > Latin ellipsis (ει > i (shortened before ps), ψ > ps)
- Greek μουσεῖον (mouseion) > Latin mūsēum (ου > ū, ει > ē, -ον > um)
- Greek μαίανδρος (maiandros) > Latin mæander (αι > æ, -ρος > er)
- Greek χρυσάνθεμον (chrȳsanthemon) > Latin chrȳsanthemum (χ > ch, υ > y, θ > th, -ον > um)
- Greek διάῤῥοια (diarroia) > Latin diarrhœa (ῤῥ > rrh, οι > œ)

== Consonants ==
=== Letters and sounds ===
- The letters b, f, k, l, m, p, v and z have each only one sound, which corresponds to the equivalent IPA symbols /b f k l m p v z/.
- The letter j has the single sound /dʒ/.
- The letter r has a single sound, /r/ in rhotic dialects of English. In nonrhotic dialects, it varies according to placement in a syllable. At the beginning of a syllable, it is pronounced /r/. At the end of a syllable, i.e. between a vowel and a consonant, or after a vowel at the end of a word, it is dropped—though not without, frequently, affecting the pronunciation of the previous vowel sound. If r occurs at the end of a word after a vowel, and the next word begins with a vowel, it is usually pronounced as the beginning of the first syllable of the next word. Rh and rrh are pronounced exactly like r and rr.
- When followed by a vowel, the combinations qu (always) and gu and su (usually) stand for /kw/, /ɡw/, and /sw/ respectively.
- The combination ph is pronounced /f/.
- The combination th is pronounced /θ/.
- The combination ch is pronounced /k/ in all environments - although in Scottish pronunciation it is pronounced /x/ at the end of a syllable.
- The letters c, d, g, h, n, s, t, x have different values depending upon surrounding sounds and syllable structure.

=== Phonemes ===
The underlying consonantal phonemes of Anglo-Latin are close in most respects to those of Latin, the primary difference being that /w/ and /j/ are replaced in Anglo-Latin by /v/ v and /dʒ/ j. The sound /θ/ th was borrowed from Greek.

		Labial	Dental	Alveolar	Palato-alveolar	Velar	Glottal
Nasal		/m/		/n/			
Stop	voiceless	/p/		/t/		/k/	
Stop	voiced	/b/		/d/		/ɡ/	
Affricate					/dʒ/		
Fricative	voiceless	/f/	/θ/	/s/			/h/
Fricative	voiced	/v/		/z/			
Approximant	median			/r/			
Approximant	lateral			/l/			

=== Consonantal allophones ===
==== Greek consonant clusters ====
Several word-initial clusters, almost all derived from Greek, are simplified in Anglo-Latin by omitting the first consonant:

- βδ bd becomes /d/: bdellium
- τμ tm becomes /m/: tmesis
- κν cn, γν gn, μν mn and πν pn become /n/: Cnossus, gnosis, Mnemosyne, pneumonia
- ψ ps becomes /s/: psyche
- κτ ct and πτ pt become /t/: Ctesiphon, ptosis
- χθ chth and φθ phth become /θ/: Chthon, phthisis
- ξ x becomes /z/: Xanthippe

In the middle of words both consonants in these clusters are pronounced (e.g. Charybdis, Patmos, Procne, prognosis, amnesia, apnœa, synopsis, cactus, captor); medial chth and phth are pronounced /kθ/ and /fθ/ respectively, as in autochthon and naphtha.

==== Polyphony ====
The letters c, d, g, h, n, s, t and x have different sounds (phonemes) depending upon their environment: these are listed summarily below.

Letter	c	d	g	h	n	s	t	x
Underlying sound	/k/	/d/	/ɡ/	/h/	/n/	/s/	/t/	/ks/
Primary phonemes	/s/		/dʒ/	∅	/ŋ/	/z/	/s/	/z/, /ɡz/
Secondary phonemes	/ʃ/	/dʒ/				/ʃ/ /ʒ/	/tʃ/ /ʃ/	/kʃ/

The full set of consonantal phonemes for Anglo-Latin is almost identical to that of English, lacking only /ð/.

Sounds of Anglo-Latin		Labials	Interdentals	Alveolars	Palatals	Velars	Glottals
Stops	voiceless	/p/		/t/		/k/	
Stops	voiced	/b/		/d/		/ɡ/	
Affricates	voiceless				/tʃ/		
Affricates	voiced				/dʒ/		
Fricatives	voiceless	/f/	/θ/	/s/	/ʃ/		/h/
Fricatives	voiced	/v/		/z/	/ʒ/		
Nasals		/m/		/n/		/ŋ/	
Approximants		/w/		/ɹ/ /l/	/j/		

===== Miscellaneous environments =====
Environments that condition the appearance of some of these phonemes are listed below:

Sound affected	Spelling	Environment	Resulting sound	Examples
/h/	h	between a preceding stressed and a following unstressed vowel	∅	cf. "vehement, annihilate"
/h/	h	after x	∅	exhibitor
/n/	n	before velars /k/ (c, ch, k, q) and /ɡ/ g	/ŋ/	incubator, fungus
/s/	s	between two vowels	/z/	miser, Cæsar, Jesus
/s/	s	between a vowel and a voiced consonant	/z/	plasma, presbyter
/s/	s	after a voiced consonant at the end of a word	/z/	lens, Mars
/ks/	x	initially	/z/	Xanthippe
/ks/	x	in the prefix ex- before a vowel or (silent) h in a stressed syllable	/ɡz/	exemplar, exhibitor

The change of intervocalic /s/ to /z/ is common but not universal. Voicing is more common in Latin than in Greek words, and never occurs in the common Greek ending -sis, where s is always voiceless: basis, crisis, genesis.

===== Palatalization =====
The most common type of phonemic change in Anglo-Latin is palatalization. Anglo-Latin reflects the results of four palatalization processes. The first of these occurred in Late Latin, the second in Proto-Gallo-Romance, the third and fourth within the history of English. While the first two palatalizations are universally used in variants of Anglo-Latin, the third and especially the fourth are incompletely observed in different varieties of Anglo-Latin, leading to some variant pronunciations.

- Palatalization 1 affected only the sound of t, converting it to /ts/ when it preceded a semivowel i (at that stage pronounced /j/) and did not follow s, t, or x. This /ts/ sound eventually merged with /s/ and was subject to further changes in Palatalization 3. When /t/ followed /s/ or /t/ it did not change; in some cases it might later change to /tʃ/ by Palatalization 4. Note that t did not change to /s/ before semivowel e, but remained /t/ as in confiteor.
- Palatalization 2 affected the sounds of c and g, converting them to /ts/ and /dʒ/; the /ts/ arising from c merged with the /ts/ arising from t, and both shared further developments of this sound, turning to /s/. When geminate (double), palatalized cc and gg were affected diversely; only the second c in cc was palatalized, producing the sound /ks/, as in successor; but both gs in gg were palatalized, producing a /dʒ/ sound, as in "exaggerate".
- Palatalization 3 affected /s/ and /z/ of whatever origin, changing them to /ʃ/ and /ʒ/.
- Palatalization 4 affected /s/ and /z/ exactly as Palatalization 3 did, but also affected /t/ and /d/, changing them to /tʃ/ and /dʒ/

Some of the occasions on which palatalizations 3 and 4 fail to take effect should be noted:

- Palatalization 3 fails: asphyxia, Cassiopeia, dyspepsia, excelsior, exeunt, gymnasium, symposium, trapezium. Note that the semivowel i is always pronounced as a full vowel /i/ in these cases. In some dialects Palatalization 3 frequently fails when another /ʃ/ sound follows, as in "enunciation", "pronunciation", "appreciation", "glaciation", "association", with the /s/ sound then generalized to closely related forms ("enunciate", "appreciate", "associate").
- Palatalization 4 fails (in some dialects): cæsura, fistula, pæninsula, pendulum.

Summary:

Palatalization	Sound affected	Spelling	Environment	Resulting sound	Examples
1	/t/	t	when not initial, following s, t, or x, and before the semivowel i	/s/	annunciator (from annuntiator) /s/ usually changes to /ʃ/ by Palatalization 3
2	/k/	c	before front vowels e, æ, œ, i, y	/s/	circus, census, Cynthia, foci, proscenium, scintilla, successor
2	/ɡ/	g	before front vowels e, æ, œ, i, y	/dʒ/	Gemini, regimen, algæ, fungi, gymnasium
3	/s/	c, t (sc, ss)	when not initial, before semivowel i and e	/ʃ/	acacia, rosacea, species, inertia, ratio fascia, cassia
3	/ks/	x	when not initial, before semivowel i and e	/kʃ/	cf. "complexion"
3	/t/	t	when not initial, before semivowel i and e	/tʃ/	cf. "question, Christian, bestial, Attius"
3	/z/	s	when not initial, before semivowel i and e	/ʒ/	Asia, ambrosia, nausea, Persia
4	/d/	d	when not initial, before (usually unstressed) open u /ju/, /jə/	/dʒ/	educator, cf. also gradual
4	/s/	s, ss	when not initial, before (usually unstressed) open u /ju/, /jə/	/ʃ/	cf. "censure, fissure"
4	/ks/	x	when not initial, before (usually unstressed) open u /ju/, /jə/	/kʃ/	cf. "luxury"
4	/t/	t	when not initial, before (usually unstressed) open u /ju/, /jə/	/tʃ/	spatula
4	/z/	s	when not initial, before (usually unstressed) open u /ju/, /jə/	/ʒ/	cf. "usual"

See further the section on the "semivowel" below.

===== Degemination =====
Following all of the above sound changes except palatalizations 3 and 4, "geminate" sequences of two identical sounds (often but not always double letters) were degeminated, or simplified to a single sound. That is, bb, dd, ff, ll, mm, nn, pp, rr, ss, tt became pronounced /b d f l m n p r s t/. However, for the purposes of determining whether a syllable is open or closed, these single consonants continue to act as consonant clusters.

Other notable instances involving degemination include:

- cc developed two pronunciations:
  - before a front vowel (e, æ, œ, i, y) cc is pronounced /ks/, and as it consists of two distinct sounds, is not degeminated.
  - before a back vowel (a, o, u) cc was pronounced /kk/ which degeminated to simply /k/
- cqu /kkw/ degeminated to /kw/
- gg also has two pronunciations:
  - before a front vowel, gg is pronounced /dʒ/ after degemination.
  - before a back vowel, gg is pronounced /ɡ/ after degemination.
- sc before a front vowel was pronounced /ss/, and degeminated to /s/.
- sc and ss before the "semivowel" are pronounced /ʃ/

The following combinations, derived from Greek, are also pronounced as single consonants:

- κχ cch is pronounced /k/: Bacchus
- πφ pph is pronounced /f/: Sappho
- τθ tth is pronounced /θ/: Pittheus

== Syllables ==
The simple vowels of Anglo-Latin (a, æ, e, ei, i, o, œ, u, y) can each have several phonetic values dependent upon their stress, position in the word, and syllable structure. Knowing which value to use requires an explanation of two syllabic characteristics, openness and stress.

=== Openness ===
Openness is a quality of syllables, by which they may be either open, semiopen, semiclosed, or fully closed.

==== Fully closed syllables ====
Fully closed syllables are those in which the vowel in the middle of the syllable (the vocalic nucleus) is followed by at least one consonant, which ends or "closes" the syllable. Vowels in fully closed syllables appear:

- At the end of a word followed by at least one consonant, e.g. plus, crux, lynx.
- In the middle of a word followed by two or more consonants. The first of these consonants "closes" the syllable, and the second begins the following syllable; thus a word like lector consists of the two closed syllables lec and tor. Sequences of three or more consonants may be broken up in different ways (e.g., sanc.tum, sculp.tor, ul.tra, ful.crum, ex.tra) but nothing depends upon the exact way in which this is done; any sequence of three or more consonants creates a closed syllable before it. The letter x is equivalent to cs, and as such also closes a syllable; a word like nexus is syllabified nec.sus, and consists of two closed syllables.
- Two successive consonants of identical pronunciation are always pronounced as a single consonant in Anglo-Latin. When such a consonant sequence follows a penult syllable, the syllable counts as closed for the purposes of determining the position of stress: ba.cíl.lus, di.lém.ma, an.tén.na, co.lós.sus; they also prevent a penult syllable from lengthening, as in the previous examples and also pal.lor, com.ma, man.na, cir.rus, cas.si.a, pas.sim, glot.tis. They also count as closed for the purpose of determining whether a u is open or closed. In these respects they act precisely like syllable-closing consonant sequences, although they are pronounced as single sounds. (In words like successor the two c's do not merge, because each of them has a different sound—/k/ and /s/, respectively.)
- Certain sequences of consonants do not close syllables: these include all instances of obstruents (stops and fricatives) followed by r, including br, cr, chr, dr, gr, pr, tr, thr. Thus words like supra and matrix are syllabified as su.pra and ma.trix, and the first syllable of both words is open; likewise a.cro.po.lis, di.plo.ma, de.tri.tus. The sequence /kw/ (spelled qu) also does not close the preceding syllable; i.e., one syllabifies re.qui.em and not req.ui.em.
- Sequences of obstruents followed by l are less consistent. The sequences cl, chl, gl and pl do not close a syllable, e.g. nu.cle.us, du.plex with open first syllables; but the sequences bl, tl, thl do close a syllable, producing the syllabifications Pub.li.us, at.las, pen.tath.lon, with closed syllables before the l.

==== Semiclosed syllables ====
Semiclosed syllables are closed, unstressed syllables that had been closed and became open due to the merger of two following consonants of the same sound. For the purpose of determining vowel reduction in initial unstressed syllables they count as open.

- Double consonants following an initial syllable containing a, e, i, o merge to count as one consonant: a.(c)cumulator, a.(g)gres.sor, ca.(l)li.o.pe, a.(p)pen.dix, e.(l)lip.sis, co.(l)lec.tor, o.(p)pres.sor, o.(p)pro.bri.um. The first syllables of all these words are only partially closed, and the vowels are reduced.
- The same phenomenon occurs after u, but note that the u is both closed and reduced: su.(p)pres.sor, su.(c)ces.sor, cu.(r)ri.cu.lum.

==== Semi-open syllables ====
Semiopen syllables are syllables that had been closed and unstressed, and that are followed by a sequence of consonants that can stand at the beginning of a syllable. Since instances of obstruents +r or l are already considered open, semiopen syllables are practically restricted to instances of s + obstruent, bl, and in some cases perhaps tl. Vowels in initial semiopen syllables may be treated as open for all purposes except for determining the value of u, which is still closed in semiopen syllables.

- When s is followed by a consonant, s syllabifies with the following consonant: a.spa.ra.gus, pro.spec.tus, na.stur.ti.um, a.sphyc.si.a (asphyxia). S also syllabifies with a following palatalized c (pronounced [s]): a.sce.sis, pro.sce.ni.um. When s syllabifies with a following consonant, the preceding syllable counts as semi-open. Possible exceptions are pos.te.ri.or, tes.ta.tor.
- Other sequences of consonants fully close an initial unstressed syllable and produce a short vowel: an.ten.na, am.ne.si.a, bac.te.ri.um, mag.ni.fi.cat, mac.sil.la (maxilla), spec.ta.tor, per.so.na, oph.thal.mi.a, tor.pe.do.

See further the section on initial unstressed syllables below.

==== Open syllables ====
Open syllables are those in which the nucleus is followed:

- By no consonant at the end of the word: pro, qua.
- By a vowel in the middle of a word : oph.thal.mi.a, fi.at, cor.ne.a, cha.os, chi.as.mus, a.ma.nu.en.sis.
- By only a single consonant in the middle of a word: sta.men, æ.ther, hy.phen, phœ.nix, ter.mi.nus, a.pos.tro.phe.
- By those consonant clusters that do not fully or partially close a syllable In the middle of a word : ma.cron, du.plex, Cy.clops, tes.ta.trix, a.cro.po.lis.

=== Stress ===
==== Primary stress ====
Stress is another characteristic of syllables. In Anglo-Latin, it is marked by greater tension, higher pitch, lengthening of vowel, and (in certain cases) changes in vowel quality. Its exact concomitants in Classical Latin are uncertain. In Classical Latin the main, or primary stress is predictable, with a few exceptions, based on the following criteria:

- In words of one syllable, stress falls on that syllable, as marked in the following syllables with an acute accent: quá, nón, pár.
- In words of two syllables, stress falls on the first syllable of the word (the penult, or second from the end): e.g., bó.nus, cír.cus.
- In words of three or more syllables, stress falls either on the penult or the antepenult (third from the end), according to these criteria:
  - If the penult contains a short vowel in an open syllable, the stress falls on the antepenult: e.g., stá.mi.na, hy.pó.the.sis.
  - If the penult contains a long vowel; a diphthong; a closed syllable (with any length of vowel); or is followed by z, the stress falls on the penult.
    - Long vowel: cicāda > cicáda, exegēsis > exegésis.
    - Diphthong: amóeba, Acháia, paranóia, thesáurus
    - Closed syllable: aórta, interrégnum, prospéctus, rotúnda
    - z: horízon

Primary stress can therefore be determined in cases where the penult is either closed or contains a diphthong. When it contains a vowel that may have been either short or long in Classical Latin, stress is ambiguous. Since Anglo-Latin does not distinguish short from long vowels, stress becomes a lexical property of certain words and affixes. The fact that decorum is stressed on the penult, and exodus on the antepenult, is a fact about each of these words that must be memorized separately (unless one is already familiar with the Classical quantities, and in the former case, additionally with the fact that decus -ŏris n. with short -o- syllable became in late Latin decus/decor -ōris m. with long -o- syllable: Dómine, diléxi decórem domus tuæ).

==== Secondary stress ====
Secondary stress is dependent upon the placement of the primary stress. It appears only in words of four or more syllables. There may be more than one secondary stress in a word; however, stressed syllables may not be adjacent to each other, so there is always at least one unstressed syllable between the secondary and primary stress. Syllables containing semivowel e or i are never stressed.

- If a four-syllable word has primary stress on the antepenult, there is no secondary stress: pa.rá.bo.la, me.tá.the.sis.
- If a four-syllable word has primary stress on the penult, secondary stress is on the first syllable, marked hereafter with a grave accent: à.la.bás.ter, è.pi.dér.mis, sì.mu.lá.crum, prò.pa.gán.da, ùl.ti.má.tum.
- If a 5-syllable word has primary stress on the antepenult, secondary stress is on the first syllable: hìp.po.pó.ta.mus, Sà.git.tá.ri.us, Phì.la.dél.phi.a.

Secondary stress in words with three or more syllables before the primary stress is less predictable. Such words include those of five syllables with penult primary stress, and all words of six syllables in length or longer. The following generalizations about such long words may be made:

- The syllable immediately before the primary stress is never stressed.
- Words produced by derivation from a shorter word convert the primary (and, if any, secondary) stress of the stem into a secondary stress, as long as it does not fall immediately before the new primary stress: é.le.phant- + í.a.sis becomes è.le.phan.tí.a.sis
- Compounds of which the compound element consists of more than one syllable likewise convert the primary stress of their elements into secondary stress: phár.ma.co- + póei.a becomes phàr.ma.co.póei.a.
- If a primary stress is eliminated in compounding or derivation because it would stand next to another stress, secondary stress remains unchanged: pùsillánimus + itas becomes pùsillanímitas.
- Single-syllable prefixes and single-syllable compound elements are generally unstressed: ac.cù.mu.lá.tor, im.pè.di.mén.ta, Her.mà.phro.dí.tus
- In other cases where the composition of the word may be unclear, every other syllable before the primary stress may be stressed: a.mà.nu.én.sis, ò.no.mà.to.póei.a. In some cases the third syllable before the primary stress is stressed when the second syllable is light, just as when assigning the primary stress.

==== Unstress ====
Unstressed syllables are all others. They are always adjacent to a stressed syllable; that is, there can never be more than two unstressed syllables in a row, and that only when the first one follows a stressed syllable.

== Semivowel ==
Several sound-changes in Anglo-Latin are due to the presence of the "semivowel", an alteration of certain front vowels. Originally ordinary vowels, they acquired at different points in history the value of the glide /j/ (a y-sound like that in English canyon). Subsequently, their value has fluctuated through history between a consonant and a vowel; the term "semivowel" thus reflects the intermediate historical as well as phonetic position of this sound. The environment in which the semivowel was produced was as follows:

1. The vowel was e (æ, œ), i (ei), or y.
2. The vowel came immediately before a vowel or diphthong.
3. The vowel was not in the initial syllable: e, æ, ei, i and y in rhea, mæander, meiosis, fiat, diaspora, hyæna, did not become semivowels.
4. The vowel was unstressed: e, æ, œ, ei, i in idea, Piræus, diarrhœa, Cassiopeia, calliope, elephantiasis did not become semivowels.

Examples of words where e, i, y became semivowels include: miscellanea, chamæleon, nausea, geranium, rabies, Aries, acacia, ratio, fascia, inertia, halcyon, polyanthus, semiosis, mediator, Æthiopia, Ecclesiastes.

The effects of the semivowel include the following:

1. Though always in hiatus with a following vowel, semivowel i and y are never pronounced like long i or y (e.g. /aɪ/); historically semivowel e could also be distinguished from "long e" (formerly [ɛː] or [eː]). In current varieties of Anglo-Latin, semivowels are pronounced in a variety of ways:
  - Most frequently as /i/: labia, radius, azalea, præmium, cornea, opium, Philadelphia, requiem, area, excelsior, symposium, Cynthia, trivia, trapezium. In British Received Pronunciation, the prescribed pronunciation was once /ɪ/.
  - In some dialects or registers of English as /j/, e.g. junior pronounced [ˈdʒuːnjər].
  - Merged with a following -es or -e ending, as in Aries, scabies.
  - They are usually deleted following the palatals /ʃ/, /ʒ/, and /dʒ/: Patricia, consortium, Persia, nausea, ambrosia, Belgium.
  - Occasionally a semivowel is retained after a palatal sound: ratio, sometimes Elysium. This type of pronunciation is an artificiality, as the sounds /ʃ/ and /ʒ/ resulted from an absorption of the original /j/ in the sequences /sj/, /zj/. The pronunciations with /ʃi/ and /ʒi/ result from a re-introduction of the i sound to conform with the spelling. This pronunciation was, however, recommended by academics, and as such is common in the pronunciation of Anglo-Latin phrases such as ab initio, in absentia, venire facias.
2. The consonant t changed to /s/ and then to /ʃ/ before the semivowel arising from i: minutia, inertia, nasturtium.
3. The sibilants /s/ (including ss, sc, c, and t) and /z/ (usually spelled s) are usually palatalized before the semivowel:
  - /s/ > /ʃ/: cassia, fascia, species, militia
  - /z/ > /ʒ/: amnesia, ambrosia
4. The vowels a, e, æ, and o in an open antepenult syllable become long if a semivowel appears in the next syllable:
  - radius, Asia, azalea, area
  - anæmia, chamæleon
  - genius, medium, interior
  - odium, cochlea, victoria

This lengthening takes place regularly in antepenultimate syllables. It is less regular in syllables further back. On the one hand, there are words that do seem to lengthen before a semivowel in the next syllable:
- Æthiopia, Ecclesiastes, mediator, negotiator, variorum.
On the other hand, some words have short vowels:
- gladiator, apotheosis, Meleagrus, polyanthus (and other words containing poly- followed by a vowel).
In general, those words with lengthened vowels in pre-antepenult syllables before a semivowel in the next syllable are those that are derive from a word with a regularly lengthened vowel in an antepenult syllable, e.g., Æthiopia from Æthiops ("Ethiopian"), Ecclesiastes from ecclesia ("church"), mediator from medium, negotiator from negotium ("business'), variorum from varius ("manifold"). The failure of gladiator (from gladius, "sword") to have a long vowel is anomalous.

== Vowels ==
=== Mergers ===
The most notable distinction between Anglo-Latin and other varieties of Latin is in the treatment of the vowels. In Anglo-Latin, all original distinctions between long and short vowels have been obliterated; there is no distinction between the treatment of a and ā, etc., for instance. However, the subsequent development of the vowels depended to a large degree upon Latin word stress (which was preserved nearly unchanged in the medieval period), and as this was in part dependent upon vowel length, in certain cases Latin vowel length contrasts have been preserved as contrasts in both stress and quality. However, the immediate governing factor is not length but stress: short vowels that were stressed for various reasons are treated exactly like stressed long vowels.

In addition to the merger of long and short vowels, other vowel mergers took place:

- the diphthongs æ and œ merged with e
- the vowels i and y merged
- the diphthong ei (also æi, œi), when still written distinctively, in pronunciation was merged with i or (more frequently) e

The merger of æ and œ with e was commonly recognized in writing. Sometimes forms written with æ and œ coexist with forms with e; in other cases the form with e has superseded the diphthong in Anglo-Latin. Consider the following:

- æon and eon, æther and ether, amœba and ameba, anæmia and anemia, anæsthesia and anesthesia, cæsura and cesura, chamæleon and chameleon, dæmon and demon, diæresis and dieresis, encyclopædia and encyclopedia, fæces and feces, fœtus and fetus, hyæna and hyena, prætor and pretor

The following words are usually spelled with e, though they originally had æ or œ:

- ænigma > enigma, æquilibrium > equilibrium, æra > era, Æthiopia > Ethiopia, diarrhœa > diarrhea, mæander > meander, musæum > museum, œsophagus > esophagus, pæninsula > peninsula, præcentor > precentor, prædecessor > predecessor, præmium > premium, præsidium > presidium, tædium > tedium

In other cases, particularly names, the forms with the diphthongs are the only correct spelling, e.g., ægis, Cæsar, Crœsus, Œdipus, onomatopœia, pharmacopœia, Phœbe, phœnix, Piræus, sub pœna.

The sequences ei, æi, œi (distinguished in writing and pronunciation from ej, the vowel followed by a consonant, as in Sejanus) are sometimes retained in spelling preceding a vowel. In such cases the sequence is invariably pronounced as a simple vowel, sometimes i (as in meiosis, pronounced as if miosis), sometimes e (as in Cassiopeia, Deianira, onomatopœia, pronounced as if Cassiopea, Deanira, onomatopea), and sometimes either (Pleiades, commonly pronounced as if Pleades or Pliades).

The result was a system of five vowels, a, e, i, o, u. These would subsequently split, according to their environment, into long, short, and (eventually) unstressed variants; and these variants would eventually also be altered based on neighboring sounds. However, in phonemic terms, Anglo-Latin still has only five vowels, with multiple allophones.

In addition, there were the diphthongs, ai, oi, ui, au and eu. Of these, ai and au eventually monophthongized, eu merged with the open variant of u, and yi merged with the "long" i. Only oi and ui remained as true diphthongs, but both are extremely rare.

=== Realizations of a, e, i and o ===
The vowels a, e, i, o each have three primary variants: long, short, and reduced. Each of these may, in turn, exhibit allophonic variation based on features of its phonetic environment, including whether it is stressed, whether it is in an open or closed syllable, where it is positioned in the word, and what consonants are next to it. One of the most common environmental causes of vowel alteration is the presence of a following r. Vowels altered by a following "r" are called "r-colored".

==== Short vowels ====
This is the default value for vowels, observed:

1. In closed monosyllables
2. In stressed closed penult syllables
3. In all antepenult syllables, open or closed, which receive primary stress, except for those lengthened due to a following semivowel. However, late school practice came to deviate from this in the case of open syllables, as explained below.
4. In all syllables with secondary stress
5. In fully closed unstressed syllables which immediately precede, but do not follow, a primary or secondary stress (usually in the first syllable of a word), with exceptions for certain prefixes

All short vowels have variants colored by a following r sound when the r is followed by a different consonant (not r) or by the end of the word. In addition, there is a variant of short a that only appears after a /w/ sound – chiefly found in the sound qu /kw/. This is a relatively recent phonetic development in English and Anglo-Latin, so it wasn't present in earlier stages of Anglo-Latin.

Short vowels	IPA	Type 1	Type 2	Type 3 (Note: Note that open vowels in such words were lengthened in Latin school practice in the late 19th century, as explained below.)	Type 4	Type 5
a	/æ/	pax	mantis, pallor, malefactor	camera, marathon, calculus	anæsthesia, saturnalia	antenna, magnificat
ar	/ɑːr/	par, Mars	argus, catharsis	arbiter, Barbara	arbitrator, pharmacopœia	narcissus, sarcophagus
e	/ɛ/	rex	sector, error, præceptor, interregnum	Gemini, Penelope	memorandum, impedimenta	pentathlon, September, spectator
æ	/ɛ/		quæstor	Æschylus, diæresis	prædecessor, æquilibrium	
œ	/ɛ/			Œdipus		
i	/ɪ/	nil	isthmus, lictor, cirrus, narcissus	simile, tibia, antithesis, Sirius, delirium	simulacrum, administrator, hippopotamus	scintilla, dictator
y	/ɪ/		lynx, Scylla, Charybdis	chrysalis, synthesis, Thucydides, Syria	symbiosis	hysteria
er	/ɜːr/	per	vertex, Nerva	terminus, hyperbola	perpetrator	Mercator, persona
ir	/ɜːr/		circus, Virgo			Virginia
yr	/ɜːr/		thyrsus	myrmidon		
w-colored a	/ɒ/		quantum			
o	/ɒ/	non	impostor, horror	optimum, conifer, metropolis	propaganda, operator	October, thrombosis
w-colored ar	/ɔːr/	quartus				
or	/ɔːr/	cortex, forceps	formula	cornucopia	torpedo	

Exceptionally, monosyllables ending in es are pronounced with the rhyme /iːz/, e.g., pes, res. This pronunciation is borrowed from that of -es used as an ending. Similarly, the pronouns nos, vos are pronounced with the rhyme -oʊ̯s like the similar accusative plural ending.

Exceptions to the pronunciation of short y generally involve prefixed elements beginning with hy- in an open syllable, such as hydro- and hypo-; these are always pronounced with a long y, e.g. hydrophobia, hypochondria. This pronunciation is the result of hypercorrection; they used to be pronounced with a short /ɪ/, as is still the case in the word "hypocrite" and (for some speakers and formerly commonly) hypochondria.

Prefixes may also behave in anomalous ways:

1. The prefix ob- in unstressed syllables may be reduced to /əb/, even when it closes a syllable: cf. "obsession, oblivion".
2. The Greek prefix en-, em- in a closed unstressed syllable may be reduced to /ɪn, ən/, /ɪm, əm/: encomium, emporium.
3. The prefix ex- in an unstressed syllable may be reduced to /əks/, /əɡz/, despite always being in a closed syllable: exterior, exemplar.
4. The prefix con-, com- is reduced to /kən/, /kəm/ when unstressed: consensus, compendium, regardless of whether the syllable is closed or not.
5. The preposition and prefix post(-) is anomalously pronounced with "long o": /poʊst/: post-mortem and cf. "postpone"; also thus in words in which post was originally a preposition (postea, postquam) but not in other derivatives, being pronounced with short o in posterus, posterior, postremo, postridie.

==== Long vowels ====
Long vowels are those that historically were lengthened. By virtue of subsequent sound changes, most of these are now diphthongs, and none is distinguished by vowel length; however, the term "long" for these vowels is traditional. "Long" vowels appear in three types of environments:

1. a, e, i and o are long in an open monosyllable
2. a, e, i and o are long in a stressed open penult syllable
3. a, e and o are long when in an open syllable followed by semivocalic i and e
4. a and o are long when they precede another vowel in hiatus; i and e are long in the same environments, but only when they are not semivocalic (i. e., when they are in the initial syllable or receive primary stress). Hiatus may be original, or may arise from the deletion of h between a stressed and unstressed syllable

"Long" vowels	IPA	Type 1	Type 2	Type 3	Type 4
a	/eɪ/	a, qua	crater, lumbago	radius, rabies	chaos, aorta, phaëthon
ar	/ɛər/		pharos	area, caries	
e	/iː/	e, re	ethos, lemur, Venus	genius	idea, creator
æ	/iː/		Cæsar	anæmia, chamæleon	æon, mæander
œ	/iː/		amœba, Crœsus		diarrhœa
ei	/iː/				Deianira, Pleiades
er or ær	/ɪər/		serum, Ceres, æra	bacterium, criterion, materia	
i	/aɪ/	i, pi	item, Tigris, saliva, iris, horizon	(i remains short, e.g. trivia)	miasma, hiatus, calliope
y	/aɪ/		hydra, python, papyrus	(y remains short, e.g. Polybius)	hyæna, myopia
o	/oʊ/	O, pro	bonus, toga	odium, encomium, opprobrium	boa, Chloe, cooperator
or	/ɔər/		chorus, forum, thorax	emporium, euphoria	

I was also usually long in an initial open syllable in front of a stressed one, as in vitellus, idoneus (see below for more detail on unstressed initial syllables). U is long in an open syllable even in the antepenultimate position, as in tumulus.

Certain antepenultimate-stressed verb forms had unexpected length: amaveram, miserat.

In Latin school practice at the end of the 19th century, stressed open vowels in antepenultimate syllables (i.e. in type 3 words), such as sidera, nomina and viaticum, began to be pronounced long in cases when the vowel had been long in Classical Latin. Thus, sidera came to be pronounced with a stressed /aɪ/, nomina with /oʊ/, and viaticum with /eɪ/. However, this was not applied in proper names: e.g. Sysiphus and Eurypides retained the pronunciation with stressed /ɪ/.

On the other hand, in an exception from the expected rule for Type 2 words, the penultimate vowel in front of b, as in tibi, sibi, quibus, as well as in the word ero (and other forms with the same stem such as eras, etc.) and Paris was pronounced short.

==== Reduced vowels ====
Reduced vowels appear in unstressed syllables, except for:

- Closed initial unstressed syllables, which are generally short.
- Certain unstressed final syllables.

===== Initial unstressed syllables =====
A variety of possible realizations are available for open, semi-open, and semi-closed initial unstressed syllables, including (for e and i) long, short, and reduced variants. Fully closed initial unstressed syllables are always short.

Open and semi-open unstressed vowels in absolute initial position
Vowel	IPA	Examples
a	/ə/	amœba, anemone, ascesis
e	/ᵻ/ (Note: A "schwi". It generally conflates with /ɪ/ in RP and with schwa in Australia. Directly before another vowel it may be the 'HAPPY' vowel.)	Elysium, emeritus, epitome, erotica
æ	/ᵻ/	ænigma
œ	/ᵻ/	œsophagus
i	/aɪ/	idea
y	/aɪ/	hyperbola, hypothesis
o	/ᵿ/ (Note: A rounded schwa. It has a w-like offglide before another vowel the way /oʊ/ does, but otherwise in many dialects it conflates with schwa.)	Olympus

Initial-syllable open/semiopen unstressed vowels
Vowel	IPA	Examples
a	/ə/	papyrus, placebo, saliva, basilica
e	/ᵻ/*	December, thesaurus
æ	/ᵻ/*	Mæcenas, pæninsula, phænomenon
i	/aɪ, ᵻ/	criteria, tribunal, minutiæ, cicada
y	/aɪ, ᵻ/	lyceum, psychosis, synopsis, chrysanthemum
o	/ᵿ/**	November, rotunda, colossus, proscenium

The variation in the value of the initial open unstressed vowel is old. Two different types of variation can be distinguished; the older use of a "long" vowel for i, y, o (and their variants); and more recent variations in the value of the reduced vowel.

No completely general rule can be laid down for the appearance of an initial unstressed long vowel, although such vowels must have appeared before the shortening of geminate consonants, as they are restricted to fully open syllables. The most general tendency is for long vowels to appear when i and y are either preceded by no consonant or by h, e.g., idea, isosceles, hyperbola, hypothesis. The prefixes in and syn never have long vowels: inertia, synopsis. I and y also tend to be short when the next syllable contains an i or y, short or long: militia, divisor.

O is a little less likely to appear with a long value in this location; or, at any rate, it is harder to distinguish the long value from the reduced vowel.

Unstressed e and i in open syllables had merged by the early 17th century; their reduced reflex is often transcribed [ə], but by many speakers is still pronounced as a high front lax vowel, distinct from the [ə] derived from a, here transcribed ⟨ᵻ⟩. For such speakers, the first syllables in Demeter and Damascus are pronounced differently.

Unstressed o, also often transcribed [ə], is by many speakers pronounced with considerable lip-rounding, here transcribed ⟨ᵿ⟩.

Semi-closed initial unstressed vowels
Vowel	IPA	Examples
a	/ə/	addendum, appendix, calliope, farrago
e	/ɛ, ᵻ/	ellipsis, Ecclesiastes, erratum
i	/ɪ, ᵻ/	Illyria, cf. cirrhosis
y	/ɪ, ᵻ/	syllepsis
o	/ə/	collector, oppressor, opprobrium, possessor

The partially closed initial unstressed vowels began as short vowels, but were later reduced.

These are the same sounds as in the preceding chart, but without the option of the "long" vowels and much less rounding of the o.

proscenium does not fall in this group, apparently because felt to be pro+scenium.

===== Medial unstressed syllables =====
All vowels in medial unstressed syllables are reduced to /ə/ or /ɪ/, regardless of whether they are in open or closed syllables.

Medial unstressed vowels
Vowel	IPA	Examples
a	/ə/	diabetes, emphasis, syllabus, diagnosis, melancholia
e	/ᵻ/*	impetus, phaethon, malefactor, commentator, Alexander
i	/ᵻ/*	animal, legislator
y	/ᵻ/*	platypus, analysis, apocrypha
o	/ə/	hyperbola, demonstrator
Vr	/ər/	interceptor, superficies

=== Open and closed u ===
The pronunciation of the letter u does not depend upon stress, but rather upon whether the syllable in which it appears is open or closed. There are no "long" and "short" variants of either type of u, but there are reduced and r-colored variants of both types.

==== Open u ====
The underlying sound of open u is /juː/; it shares developments with the homophonous diphthong eu, which can however appear in closed syllables.

The sound [j] in /juː/ and its variants is deleted in various environments:

- After palatal consonants (/ʃ tʃ ʒ dʒ/), whether original or resulting from the merger of /j/ and the preceding consonant, in both stressed and unstressed syllables; e.g. /dʒ/: junior, Julius, Jupiter, cæsura, educator, spatula, fistula

After the following consonants when they precede u in an initial, final, or stressed syllable:

- /r/ and /l/: rumor, verruca, luna, Lucretia, Pluto, effluvium
- /s/, /z/ (except in conservative speech): super, superior, Vesuvius, and variably Zeus

In some dialects, particularly of American English, /j/ is deleted after all dental/alveolar consonants when they precede u in an initial, final or stressed syllable:

- /d/, /n/, /t/ and /θ/: duplex, caduceus, medusa, nucleus, lanugo, tutor, Thucydides
- For some speakers, /juː/ is pronounced [ɪu] following these consonants.

/j/ is not deleted in the following environments:

- When u is the first letter of the word or follows /h/: uterus, humerus
- Following a vowel: Ophiuchus
- Following labials /p b f v m/: pupa, furor, nebula, uvula, musæum
- Following velars /k ɡ/ : cumulus, lacuna, Liguria
- When it is in an interior unstressed syllable not following a palatal consonant, /j/ remains after a single consonant even when it might be deleted in a stressed syllable: amanuensis and cf. "cellular, granular", for some speakers "virulent".
- After a consonant cluster /j/ may or may not be deleted: pæninsula, cornucopia

Open u
Environment	Examples with /j/		Examples without /j/	
in stressed syllables	/juː/	humor, uterus, tribunal, euthanasia	/uː/	rumor, verruca, junior, Jupiter
in stressed syllables, r-colored	/jʊər/	furor	/ʊər/	juror
in unstressed initial syllables	/jᵿ/	musæum, urethra, euphoria, eureka	/ᵿ/	superior
in medial unstressed syllables	/jᵿ/	calculus, nebula, spatula	/ᵿ/	
in unstressed final syllables	/juː/	impromptu, situ	/uː/	passu
in unstressed hiatus	/jᵿ/	amanuensis, innuendo		

==== Closed u ====
Closed u appears only in closed syllables, except for instances of the prefix sub- before a vowel. It has reduced and r-colored variants, as shown below. r-coloration only appears when the r is followed by a different consonant (not r) or the end of the word.

Closed u
Environment	Examples
/ʌ/ in stressed syllables	sulfur, alumnus, ultimatum
/ɜːr/ in r-colored stressed syllables	laburnum, murmur, præcursor
/ʌ/ in initial fully closed unstressed syllables	ulterior, omnibus
/ə/ in initial open or semi-closed unstressed syllables	suburbia, curriculum
/ə/ in medial unstressed syllables	illustrator
/ər/ in all r-colored unstressed syllables	murmur, sequitur, saturnalia

=== Diphthongs ===
Diphthongs in Anglo-Latin are distinguished from simple vowels by having no long or short variants, regardless of position or syllable type. The only diphthongs that are at all common are au and eu. For variations in the pronunciation of the latter, see Open u. Au is, rarely, reduced in an unstressed syllable to [ə]: Augustus pronounced as if "Agustus". Such words may be pronounced with the full value of the diphthong, however.

Diphthongs	IPA	Examples
ai	/eɪ/	Achaia, Maia, Gaius
au	/ɔː/	aura, pauper, nausea, autochthon, aurora, glaucoma, mausoleum
ei	/aɪ/	deinde, meiosis
eu	/juː/	neuter, euthanasia, zeugma
oi	/ɔɪ/	coitus, paranoia
ou	/uː/	boustrophedon, Boudicca, cf. acoustics
ui	/juː.j/	cuius, hui, huius
yi	/aɪ/	harpyia, Eileithyia

Note that ui is generally disyllabic, as in fruc.tu.i, va.cu.i, tu.i. The monosyllabic words cui and huic were traditionally pronounced /kaɪ/ and /haɪk/.

In general, ua, ue, ui, uo, and uu come immediately after q, g, or s. However, when they occur in the same syllable, as in suavitas, questus, anguis, aliquot, and equus, they are not considered diphthongs (except in the exceptional pronunciations of cui, huic, and the above examples). Accordingly, when these letter combinations occur in the penultimate syllable, it is not necessarily stressed (e.g., équitas, not equítas). Note that their second vowel may become reduced, r-colored, or take on a different quantity even in a monosyllable.

== Endings ==
The pronunciation of the final syllables of polysyllabic words do not always correspond to what might be expected from the constituent phonemes. Some endings also have more than one pronunciation, depending upon the degree of stress given to the ending.

Three types of endings can be distinguished:

=== Vowel alone ===
The first class consists of vowels alone, i.e. -a, -e, -æ, -i, -o, -u, -y. In this class, the vowels are generally long. For -a, modern English pronunciation of the Latin loans has /ə/, but 19th-century instructions tended to recommend /ɑː/.

Letter	IPA	Examples
a	/ə/	circa, fauna, mania, quota
e	/iː/	ante, epitome, posse
æ	/iː/	algæ, larvæ, vertebræ
i, y	/aɪ/	alibi, Gemini, moly
o	/oʊ/	ego, Pluto, torpedo
u	/juː/	(in) situ

Words deriving from Greek long -ê (η) end in /iː/ unless assimilated, such as simile ending in /i/ (the 'HAPPY' vowel).

In the words tibi and sibi, the final i was pronounced like final e above (i.e., as if spelled tibe, sibe). In contrast, mihi had a long i. Thus, tibi was /ˈtɪbi/, while mihi was /ˈmaɪhaɪ/.

A late and purely academic pronunciation distinguished final -ā from -a by pronouncing the former like "long a", /eɪ/: for instance, Oxford professor A. D. Godley rhymed Rusticā and "day". That this was not the usual pronunciation can be told from such forms as circa, infra, extra, in absentia, sub pœna, all of which have an originally long final vowel: circā, sub pœnā, etc. This use is distinct from the older tradition (in use in the 17th-18th centuries) had made all final a's "long", regardless of their Latin length.

=== Vowel before a consonant cluster ===
The second class consists of vowels followed by consonant clusters such as ns, nt, nx, ps, x. In this class, the vowels are always short, except for u, which may be reduced to [ə].

Letter	IPA	Examples
a	/æ/	climax, phalanx
e	/ɛ/	biceps, index
i	/ɪ/	matrix, phœnix
o	/ɒ/	Cyclops
u	/ə/	exeunt, Pollux
y	/ɪ/	pharynx, oryx

=== Vowel before a single consonant ===
The third class consists of vowels followed by the consonants l, m, n, r, s, t. The treatment of these endings is inconsistent. Generalizations include:

1. All vowels are reduced before final r for /ər/: Cæsar, pauper, triumvir, Mentor, sulfur, martyr.
2. All vowels are reduced to /ə/ before l: tribunal, Babel, pugil, consul.
3. Except sometimes before t, a is reduced to /ə/ before any of this class of consonant: animal, memoriam, titan, atlas.
4. All instances of u are reduced to /ə/ before any of this class of consonant: consul, dictum, locus.

The remaining endings are: -at, -em, -en, -es, -et, -im, -is, -it, -on, -os, -ot. Of these, -em, -im, -is, -it, -on, -ot have two possible pronunciations, one with a short vowel and one with /ə/. Final -es and -ies are alike pronounced /iːz/. Final -eus, when derived from Greek -ευς -eus (as in Proteus) rather than from -εος -eos with the -os changed to -us in Latin, may be pronounced as a single syllable with a diphthong (juːs), or as two syllables with a long (though unstressed) e followed by -us (iː.əs). However, even when pronounced as two syllables, -eus counts as a single syllable for the purpose of determining vowel length – that is, the syllable preceding the -eus ending is considered the penult, just as happens in derivatives ending in -ian – though the placement of the stress shifts. E.g. Ἰλιονεύς Īlioneus /ɪliˈoʊniːəs, ɪˈlaɪənjuːs/ il-ee-OH-nee-əs, i-LYE-ə-nyoos.

Ending	IPA	Examples
at	/æt/	magnificat
at	/ət/	fiat
em	/ɛm/	idem, ibidem
em	/əm/	item, tandem
en	/ən/	lichen, semen
es	/iːz/	Achilles, appendices, fæces
ies	/iːz/	rabies, species
et	/ɛt/	videlicet, scilicet, quodlibet
eus	/juːs/	Perseus, Nereus
eus	/iːəs/	Perseus, Nereus
im	/ɪm/	passim
im	/əm/	interim
is	/ᵻs/*	ægis, crisis, hypothesis, basis
it	/ᵻt/*	exit, deficit
on	/ɒn/	icon, marathon
on	/ən/	bison, siphon, horizon
os	/ɒs/	chaos, pathos, pharos
ot	/ɒt/	aliquot
ot	/ət/	aliquot

* The vowel of -is, -it is a "schwi". It generally conflates with /ɪ/ in RP and with schwa in Australia.

This last pronunciation of -os is the expected one; however, in the masculine accusative plural, where the ending is historically -ōs, the academic prescription was the pronunciation /oʊs/. The same is true of the pronouns nos, vos. Such an ending is not found in English loan words or proper names.

=== Adjectives in -an and -ic ===
English adjectives formed from Greek and Latin roots often end in a suffix -an or -ic added to the oblique stem, sometimes retaining a preceding thematic vowel. These produce generally predictable sound changes in the stem though, depending on its source or simply due to confusion, English -ean may be either stressed or unstressed. The first derives from the Latin adjectival suffix -ānus, though it has far wider application in English than in Latin. (Pythian, for example, translates the Latin adjective Pythius.) The other suffix, -ic, derives from the Greek adjectival suffix -ικος -ĭkos.

The fact that these suffixes are added to the oblique stem is relevant with words of the third declension whose stems end in a consonant that alters or disappears in the nominative case, as is apparent in such English noun–adjective pairs as Pallas ~ Palladian, Mars ~ Martian, Venus ~ Venerian, and indeed from non-adjectival derivatives of these words such as "palladium". Some roots have more than one oblique stem, in which case they may have more than one adjectival form in English.

Stressed vowel plus -an and unstressed -ian

The forms of these suffixes depends on the first vowel of the nominal suffix in Latin or Greek. The resulting forms are carried over into Latin from Greek, and into English from Latin. English adjectives in -ean, where the e is inherited from the Greek, are stressed on the suffix, but there are also adjectives in -ean where the e originates in Latin, and those are not stressed.

Nominal and adjectival suffixes
Greek noun	Greek adj.	Latin adj.	English adj.
-ο- -o-	-ιος -ĭos	-ĭus	-ian
-η- -ē-	-ειος -eios	-ēus, -eius, -īus	-éan
-α- -a-	-αιος -aios	-aeus (-æus)	-aean, -éan
-ω- -ō- (-ῳ -ōi)	-ωος -ōos (-ῳος -ōios)	-ōus (-ōius)	-óan (-óian)

For example,

- Greek Samos > adjective Samios > Latin Samius > English "Sā́mian"
- Greek Periklēs > adjective Perikleios > Latin Periclēus > English "Pericléan"
- Greek Lēda > adjective Lēdaios > Latin Lēdæus > English "Ledaean" or "Ledéan"
- Greek noun and adjective Ptolemaios > Latin Ptolemæus > English "Ptolemaean"
- Greek Argō > adjective Argōos > Latin Argōus > English "Argóan"
- Greek Sapphō > adjective Sapphōios > Latin Sapphōius > English "Sapphóian"

Because the i of the suffix -ian makes an exception to the usual shortening of antepenultimate vowels, forms such as "Samian" above are pronounced with a long stressed vowel.

Many Greek nouns ending in -o- take adjectives like those ending in -ē- instead, and some may take either form, in which case there may be two adjectives in English. An example is Sisyphus:

- Greek Sīsyphos > adjective Sīsyphios > Latin Sīsyphius > English "Sisýphian"
- (or, alternatively) > adjective Sīsypheios > Latin Sīsyphēus > English "Sisyphéan"

In the opposite direction, ē-vowel Aristotelēs produces "Aristotḗlian" alongside expected "Aristoteléan".

The final iota subscript in Greek feminine words ending in -ῳ -ōi is frequently omitted in Latin, – if an "i" appears in English it may be taken directly from the Greek, – but words that end in plain -ω -ō in Greek may also have Greek adjectives in -ōios if the "i" was historically present.

Unstressed -ean

There is another suffix spelled -ean in English, but this one unstressed. It corresponds to the unstressed Latin adjectival suffix -ĕus and does not derive from Greek. An example is Latin Herculēs > Latin adj. Herculĕus > English "Hercúlean", alongside Greek Hēraklēs > Greek adj. Hērakleios > Latin Hēraclēus/Hēraclīus > English "Heracléan". The stress assignment of the "Herculean" has been affected by "Heraclean" (or perhaps simply by the ambiguity of having two suffixes spelled "-ean"), so the mixed form "Herculéan" is now also heard.

Adjectives in -ic

The Greek suffix -ικος -ĭkos replaces the vowels of nominal endings apart from retaining a or ō, which will be stressed in English. Stress assignment (and the corresponding vowel quality) of English follows the Latin, as though the suffix were -icus in English as well and the last syllable of the stem were the antepenult when it English it's actually the penult. Thus English "Homeric" is pronounced with a short stressed penultimate e, when in other English words from Latin an e in that position would be pronounced long. (Cf. botanic, which has the same stressed "a" and same vowel quality as botanical.)

Nominal and adjectival suffixes
Greek noun	Greek adj.	Latin adj.	English adj.
-ο- -o-	-ικος -ĭkos	-ĭcus	-ic
-η- -ē-	-ικος -ĭkos	-ĭcus	-ic
-α- -a-	-αικος -aikos	-aĭcus	-áic
-ω- -ō-	-ωικος -ōikos	-ōĭcus	-óic

For example,

- Greek Homēros > adjective Homērikos > Latin Homēricus > English "Homĕ́ric"
- Greek Aristotelēs > adjective Aristotelikos > Latin Aristotelicus > English "Arístotĕ́lic"
- Greek Alkaios > adjective Alkaikos > Latin Alcaicus > English "Alcáic"
- Greek hērōs > adjective hērōikos > Latin hērōicus > English "heróic"
- Greek ēchō > adjective ēchōikos > Latin ēchōicus > English "echóic"

Thus "Aristotelian" is pronounced with a long e, but "Aristotelic" with a short e.

A number of Greek nouns ending in ē (which historically is a long ā) form adjectives in -aic, such as "Cyrenaic" (Greek Kȳrēnē > adj. Kȳrēnaikos > Latin Cȳrēnaicus).

== Variations ==
=== "Victorian" system ===
Some reformers of Latin teaching in the late 19th century championed a modified variant of the Traditional English pronunciation where the original Classical Latin vowel quantities would be faithfully reflected by the "length" of the English vowels used. In other words, the original quantity would be restored, while the English quality of the sounds would be retained. Thus, the original Latin long stressed vowels in nomina and Lydia were pronounced "long", i.e. as /oʊ/ and /aɪ/ (as opposed to Traditional /ɒ/ and /ɪ/); and the original Latin short vowel in alias was pronounced 'short", i.e. as /æ/ (as opposed to Traditional /eɪ/). Similarly, the diphthongs ae and oe were to be always rendered as "long" (i.e. as /iː/). The influence of this school of thought is sometimes reflected in the UK English pronunciations of words like Oedipus, Aeschylus, quaestor, aesthete, sometimes aesthetic, while the trend was generally not accepted in American English. A further contribution of this reformed system is the alternative pronunciation of Ancient Greek names ending in -eus like Orpheus with -/juːs/ alongside the older -/ɪəs/. There was even an attempt to restore the Classical Latin "hard" pronunciations of c and g in front of front vowels within an overall Traditional English context.

=== "Continental" system ===
According to Andrew Collins, English Catholics used for a long time a pronunciation with English-like values of the consonant letters, as in the system described above, but approximations of the Italian values of the vowel letters (/eɪ/ for long e, /iː/ for long i etc.). Some non-Catholics also adopted a similar practice. In the late 19th century, however, this was displaced in Catholic communities by consistently Italianate pronunciation. This latter process was championed by new British converts to Catholicism and was initially resisted by "old Catholics". Some have explained such "continental" values with foreign (Italian) influence, while others have suggested that they had somehow resisted the Great Vowel Shift. There were occasional similar uses of "continental" values in other contexts as well: in the 18th century, British theatre actors of the declamatory school like James Quin reportedly used the PALM vowel for Latin a as in Cato, while the more naturalistically oriented David Garrick used the FACE vowel.

== History ==
Latin as traditionally pronounced by English speakers is part of the living history of spoken Latin through medieval French into English.

Three stages of development of Anglo-Latin can thus be distinguished:

Note: The English pronunciation of Latin varies with accent as much as English itself, as the two phonological systems are inseparably connected. For convenience's sake, the list below will end with approximately a received pronunciation accent. As the traditional pronunciation of Latin has evolved alongside English since the Middle Ages, the page detailing English's phonological evolution from Middle English (in this case, from the Middle-English-Latin pronunciation roughly midway through the 1400-1600 section) can give a better idea of what exactly has happened, and this is just an overview.

=== Stage I ===
Latin from the period when its orthography and grammar became standardized through to the pronunciation changes of Late Latin, while it was still a living language. Changes that took place in this period included:

- the merger of f and ph as [f]
- the change in pronunciation of v (formerly [w]) to [v] and of j (formerly [j]) to [dʒ].
- the merger of i and y as [i]
- the merger of e, æ and œ as [e]
- the change of non-initial, unstressed, prevocalic [i] and [e] to [j]
- the loss of distinctions of vowel length (merger of all long and short vowels)
- the palatalization of t to [ts] before [j]

=== Stage II ===
Latin spoken in the context of Gallo-Romance and French from approximately the 6th to the 11th-12th centuries. During this period, Latin became a primarily written language, separated from the ordinary spoken language of the people. While it escaped many of the changes of pronunciation and grammar of Gallo-Romance, it did share a few of the changes of the spoken language. This was for the most part a period of stability. Changes in this period included:

- the palatalization of c and g to [ts] and [dʒ] before front vowels
- the voicing of intervocalic s to [z]
- the fronting of u to [y]
- the restoration (based on spelling) of the vowels [i] and [e] from [j]

=== Stage III ===
Latin spoken in the context of English from the 11th/12th centuries to the present. This last stage provides the greatest and most complicated number of changes. It starts with the displacement of the native pronunciation of Latin under the Anglo-Saxon kings with that used in the north of France, around the time of the Norman conquest in 1066. The English and French pronunciations of Latin were probably identical down to the 13th century, but subsequently Latin as spoken in England began to share in specifically English sound changes. Latin, thus naturalized, acquired a distinctly English sound, increasingly different from the pronunciation of Latin in France or elsewhere on the Continent. For example, Arthur, Prince of Wales and Catherine of Aragon corresponded for two years in Latin, but when they met in 1501 they found that they could not understand each other's spoken conversation, because they had learned different Latin pronunciations.

Some phases of development in this third stage can be reconstructed:

==== 1200–1400 ====
- The adaptation of the French sounds to English:
  - [s] was substituted for [ts]. (The French sound changed at about the same time; however, Anglo-Latin did not share related French simplifications such as [dʒ] > [ʒ].)
  - the vowels were given the values a [a], e [ɛ], i [i], o [ɔ], u [y]
  - [u] was substituted for [y] in closed syllables, e.g. lux [lyks] > [luks]. [y] did not substitute out as [u] in unstressed open syllables, as it would have if the [y]~[u] distinction was solely length based: saeculum [sɛkylum]
  - At some point in the Middle English period, the distinctly French vowel [y] was substituted with the English diphthong [iw]. It is unclear when exactly this happened, and may have always been the English pronunciation of French (and consequently Latin) u.
- Stressed open penultimate vowels were lengthened, creating the short/long contrasts:

a [a]:[aː], e (also ae, oe) [ɛ]:[ɛː], i (also y) [i]:[iː], o [ɔ]:[ɔː], u [u] or [iw]:[iw]

==== 1400–1600 ====
- Merger of unstressed open [ɛ] with [ɪ]
- Non-syllable-initial, unstressed, prevocalic [ɪ] became [j] (a change almost identical to that of Late Latin)
- Lengthening of the first of two vowels in hiatus
- Lengthening of e [ɛ], i [ɪ], or o [ɔ] in pretonic initial syllables
- Diphthongization of [iː] to [ɛi]
- Lengthening of vowels in open syllables before [j] in the next syllable
- Raising of [ɛː] and [ɔː] to [eː] and [oː].
- Degemination of geminate consonants
- Palatalization of [s] and [z] before [j]
- Fronting of [ɐː] to [aː]

==== 1600–1800 ====
- Monophthongization of ai to [aː] and au to [ɔː]
- Change of [j] to [ɪ] (later > [i]) in many words, restoring original syllabicity.
- Change of fronted u ([iw]) to [juː]
- Palatalization of [t d s z] before (usually unstressed) [juː] (later > [jə])
- Lowering (and unrounding in the case of [ʊ]) of short [ʊ], [ɔ] to [ʌ], [ɒ]
- Tensing of short e [ɛ] to [e]
- Former long i [ɛi] becomes [ai]
- Fronting and raising of short a [a], long a [aː], and long e [eː] to [æ] [eː] [iː], creating the new contrasts: a [æ]: [eː], e [e]:[iː], i [ɪ]:[ai], o [ɒ]:[oː]
- Beginning of vowel reductions to [ə].
- Short e, i and u before R; i.e. [ɛɹ], [ɪɹ] and [ʌɹ] are all merged to [ɜɹ]. (the NURSE merger)
- Short a [æ] is lowered and lengthened before r in a closed syllable, ultimately reaching modern [ɑː]

==== 1800–present ====
- Breaking of [eː] and [oː] to diphthongs [ei] and [ou], and then laxing to [eɪ], [oʊ] and the latter further to [əʊ]
- In non-rhotic accents, syllable-final r [ɹ] becomes a vowel [ə̯]. The vowel-R sequences simplify somewhat: arC [ɑə̯] > [ɑː], orC [ɒə̯] > [ɔː], erC, irC, urC [ɜə] > [ɜː].
- Continued reduction of unstressed vowels to [ə].
- Shortening of a in a stressed open penult syllable, e.g., data (not for all speakers)

== Other languages ==
A similar situation occurred in other regions, where the pronunciation of the local language influenced the pronunciation of Latin, eventually being replaced with reconstructed classical pronunciation. In German-speaking areas, traditional Germanized pronunciation of Latin is discussed at Deutsche Aussprache des Lateinischen (in German), with reconstructed classical pronunciation at Schulaussprache des Lateinischen (in German).

== References in literature ==
In Rattigan's play Separate Tables the following conversation takes place between Major Pollock, who has been lying about his background, and Mr Fowler, a retired schoolmaster:

Pollock: . . . Still, those days are past and gone. Eheu fugaces, Postume, Postume.
Fowler: (Correcting his accent) Eheu fugaces, Postume, Postume. Didn't they teach you the new pronunciation at Wellington?
Pollock: No. The old.
Fowler: When were you there?
Pollock: Now, let's think. It must have been nineteen eighteen I went up—
Fowler: But they were using the new pronunciation then, I know. . . .

In Goodbye, Mr. Chips, Chips says: "Well, I—umph—I admit that I don't agree with the new pronunciation. I never did. Umph—a lot of nonsense, in my opinion. Making boys say 'Kickero' at school when— umph—for the rest of their lives they'll say 'Cicero'—if they ever—umph—say it at all. And instead of 'vicissim'— God bless my soul—you'd make them say, 'We kiss 'im'! Umph— umph!"

In a fictional case Rex v. Venables and Others in A. P. Herbert's Uncommon Law, after a barrister uses phrases such as "ooltrah weerayze" (ultra vires) and "preemah fakiay" (prima facie) with the new Classics pronunciation he was taught at school, the Lord Chief Justice says "You are not to be blamed, Mr. Wick. But I am bound to make it clear to you, to the rest of your gallant generation and to the generations that come after, that His Majesty's judges will not permit the speaking of the Latin tongue after that fashion in the King's Courts. I cannot hear you, Mr. Wick, for the very good reason that I cannot understand you. We are using different languages. ... The bitter conclusion is, Mr. Wick, that you must go away and learn to pronounce the Latin tongue correctly, according to the immemorial practice of your profession."

== Sources ==
- Andrews, E. A., and S. Stoddard, 1836. Grammar of the Latin Language for the Use of Schools and Colleges. This popular Latin grammar printed toward the end of the period when Anglo-Latin pronunciation was still commonly taught in schools, devotes a section to the rules of the pronunciation. While somewhat scattershot in its approach, it reveals several otherwise inaccessible details of the traditional pronunciation.
- Brittain, Frederick (1955). Latin in Church -- the History of its Pronunciation. Alcuin Club Tract (second ed.). London: Mowbray & Co. Mainly devoted to establishing the authenticity of Anglo-Latin against the claims of the Italianate pronunciation.
- Campbell, Frederick Ransom, 1888. The Language of Medicine. Chapter II, pp. 58–64 describes the pronunciation used in late 19th-century scientific and medical Latin.
- Collins, Andrew, 2012. The English Pronunciation of Latin: Its Rise and Fall. The Cambridge Classical Journal (2012) 58, 23–57.
- Copeman, Harold (1992). Singing in Latin, or Pronunciation Explor'd. Oxford.. History and advice on singing Latin written or performed in the British Isles, France, Germany, Italy, Spain and Portugal.
- Dobson, E. J., ed., 1957. The Phonetic Writings of Robert Robinson. Includes a phonetic transcription of a Latin poem representing the English pronunciation of Latin c. 1617, the direct ancestor of the later Anglo-Latin pronunciation.
- Ommundsen, Peter. "Pronunciation of Biological Latin".
- Owen, Andrew, Pronouncing the Pater Noster in Modern English Latin taken from Copeman (1992) page 279
- Rigg, A.G. (1996). "Anglo-Latin". In Timothy J. McGee (ed.). Singing Early Music: The Pronunciation of European Languages in the Late Middle Ages and Renaissance. Bloomington: Indiana University Press. pp. 46–61. ISBN 0253210267.
- Robinson, D. H., revised by Hannah Oliver, 1903. The Latin Grammar of Pharmacy and Medicine. Chapter I, pp. 7–11, describe the pronunciation of pharmaceutical and medical Latin.
- Sargeaunt, John (1920). The Pronunciation of English Words Derived from the Latin. Society for Pure English Tract. Oxford: Clarendon Press.
- Sturmer, Julius William, 1908. Rudiments of Latin. pp. 9–17 describe early 20th-century scientific Latin pronunciation.
- Walker, John (1798). Key to the Classical Pronunciation of Greek, Latin, and Scripture Proper Names. Hopkins and Earle, no. 170, Market-street. Fry and Kammerer, printers. "editions:97Ks2reWxwAC." Although this handbook is mostly devoted to establishing the position of the accent in Classical names used in English, it also includes an essay setting out some of the rules and regularities in the Anglo-Latin pronunciation.
- The Westminster School pronunciation of Latin
- Perseus Greek and Latin dictionaries. The most complete Greek and Latin dictionaries available online, they include the entire 9th edition of Liddell & Scott's A Greek–English Lexicon. Greek headwords use the following conventions to remedy the defective orthography for vowels: α^ ι^ υ^ for short α ι υ (adapted to Latin as ă ĭ y̆) and α_ ι_ υ_ for long α ι υ (adapted to Latin as ā ī ȳ).

== See also ==
- Law Latin
