= Antejuramentum =

Antejuramentum, and præjuramentum, historically called juramentum calumniæ (literally, "oath to accuse falsely"), is an oath which both the accuser and accused were obliged to make before any trial or purgation. The accuser was to swear that he would prosecute the criminal, and the accused was to make oath on the very day that he was to undergo the ordeal, that he was innocent of the claims of which he was charged. If the accuser failed, the criminal was discharged. If the accused failed, he was intended to be guilty, and was not to be admitted to purge himself by the ordeal (see: combat, duel, etc.). The name of this oath, "Antejuramentum", is law latin.

== See also ==
- Calumny
- Trial by combat
- Trial by ordeal
