= Michael MacDonagh =

Michael MacDonagh may refer to:

- Michael MacDonagh (author) (1860–1946), Irish journalist
- Michael MacDonagh (bishop) (1698–1746) Irish Roman Catholic bishop

== See also ==
- Michael McDonagh (1904–1975), Irish boxer
- Mike McDonagh, Irish United Nations official
