= Hugh Hallett =

Sir Hugh Hallett

Justice of the High Court
- In office 1939–1957

Personal details
- Education: Westminster School; Christ Church, Oxford

Sir Hugh Imbert Periam Hallett, MC (12 December 1886 – 8 September 1967) was an English barrister and High Court judge from 1939 to 1957, when he resigned followed judicial criticism of his conduct.

== Biography ==
=== Early life and career ===
Hallett was the son of Forbes Ernest Hallett, a barrister, and Eliza Sophia, née Imbert-Terry. He was educated at Westminster School and Christ Church, Oxford, and was President of the Oxford Union in 1908.

He was called to the Bar by the Inner Temple in 1911. During the First World War, he served with the 24th Battalion, London Regiment. He reached the rank of captain and was awarded the Military Cross. He returned to legal practice in 1919, joining the North-Eastern Circuit. He was appointed King's Counsel in 1936, Recorder of Newcastle upon Tyne in 1938, and Bencher of the Inner Temple in 1939. He was Reader of the Inner Temple in 1963 and Treasurer in 1964.

=== Judicial career and resignation ===
Hallett was appointed to the High Court of Justice in 1939 on the recommendation of Lord Maugham, receiving the customary knighthood. He was assigned to the King's Bench Division. Nicknamed "Hippy" Hallett (a pun on his initials), Hallett was known for his legal learning, but his loquacity became the subject of criticism. In the early 1950s, the Court of Appeal quashed a conviction because Hallett consistently interrupted the defence counsel's speech. In 1957, he was the subject of further criticism by the Court of Appeal, which quashed his verdict in Jones v National Coal Board because he constantly interrupted evidence and asked too many questions.

Allowing the appeal, Denning LJ (Romer and Parker LJJ with him) said that:

A judge of acute perception, acknowledged learning, and actuated by the best of motives, has nevertheless himself intervened so much in the conduct of the case that one of the parties - nay, each of them - has come away complaining that he was not able properly to put his case; and these complaints are, we think, justified.

Hallett resigned the same year. According to Denning, the Lord Chancellor, Lord Kilmuir:

sent for the Judge. It was arranged that he should continue to sit for a little while and then resign. That he did at the end of the summer term. It was a poignant case; for he was able and intelligent - but he asked too many questions.

Hallett was subsequently appointed Electoral Boundaries Commissioner for British Guiana, established under the terms of the British Guiana Constitutional Conference, in 1960.

=== Family ===
Hallett married Winifred Sydney Spalding in 1921; they had one daughter.
