= Ian Glick =

Ian Bernard Glick, KC (born 18 July 1948) is a British barrister and arbitrator. He is the deputy head of chambers at One Essex Court, a leading set of commercial barristers in the Temple.

== Early life ==
Glick is the son of Louis Glick and Phyllis Barnett. He was educated at Bradford Grammar School and Balliol College, Oxford. While studying law at Oxford University he was elected President of the Oxford Union.

== Legal career ==
Glick was called to the bar at Inner Temple in 1970 and appointed a Queen's Counsel in 1987. Ian Glick was formerly standing junior counsel to the DTI in export credit cases. From 1997 to 1999 he was chairman of the Commercial Bar Association. He sits as a deputy High Court judge in the Commercial Court and the Chancery Division. He is a Fellow of the Chartered Institute of Arbitrators and is a chairman of the Disciplinary Tribunals of the International Petroleum Exchange.

== Personal life ==
Ian Glick is married, with three sons.
