= Osborne William Tancock =

English clergyman, headmaster, and author

O. W. Tancock

Orders
- Ordination: 1864

Personal details
- Born: 25 June 1839 Truro, Cornwall
- Died: 26 March 1930 (aged 90)
- Denomination: Church of England
- Residence: The Cedars, Springfield, Essex
- Parents: Rev. Dr. Osborne John Tancock
- Spouse: Elizabeth Clara Kendall Channer
- Children: Five sons and two daughters
- Occupation: Clergyman, headmaster, and author
- Education: Truro Grammar School
- Alma mater: Exeter College, Oxford

Osborne William Tancock (25 June 1839 – 26 March 1930) was an English clergyman, headmaster, and author. At Oxford he was President of the Oxford Union Society.

== Life ==
Born at Truro in Cornwall, Tancock was the son of a Church of England clergyman, the Rev. Dr. Osborne John Tancock, himself the son of Rear Admiral John Tancock RN. Educated at Truro Grammar School and Exeter College, Oxford, he took a second in Classical Moderations and later a second in Literae Humaniores, graduating BA in 1862 and MA in 1864. In 1862 he was promoted to Captain in the Oxford University Volunteer Rifles and in the Michaelmas term of the same year was President of the Oxford Union Society. He was ordained in 1864.

Between 1862 and 1879 Tancock was a master at Sherborne School, before being appointed as Headmaster of King Edward VI School, Norwich, in 1879. Ten years later he left Norwich to become Rector of Little Waltham, Essex, and did not retire from that benefice until 1925, when he was in his mid eighties. From 1906 to 1914 he was an Honorary Canon of St Albans Cathedral and after 1914 of Chelmsford. He also served as a member of the Essex County Council Education Committee between 1902 and 1924.

Tancock's younger brother the Rev. Charles Coverdale Tancock (1851–1922) also became a schoolmaster and was headmaster of Rossall School, 1886–1896, and of Tonbridge School, 1899–1907.

In 1865, Tancock married firstly Elizabeth Clara Kendall Channer. After her death in 1867 he married secondly, in 1874, Isabella Poyntz Wright. He had a total of five sons and two daughters. His son by his first marriage, Osborne Kendall Tancock (1866–1946) and his third son, Alexander Charles Tancock (died 1966) were British Army officers and retired as Colonels. Another son, Ernest Osborne Tancock (1886–1971), was a schoolmaster and amateur astronomer, known for his books The Elements of Descriptive Astronomy (1913) and Starting Astronomy (1951), as well as being the editor of Philips’ Chart of the Stars (1940, 1957).

In Who's Who 1930 he gave his recreations as "Cricket in other days, lawn tennis, chess, natural history, zoology". When he died in 1930, at the age of ninety, his address was The Cedars, Springfield, Essex.

== Publications ==
- England During the American and European Wars, 1765–1820 (New York: Harper, 1878; London: Longmans, Green, 1886)
- The English Language (reprinted 2010, ISBN 9788190600866)
- Marlowe's Edward the Second (1879)
- Wiclif, a Lecture
- An English Grammar and reading book for lower forms in classical schools (Clarendon Press, 1878)
- An Elementary English Grammar and Exercise Book
- Epoch of English History
- The old parish register books of the deanery of Chelmsford (1896)
