= Henry Nutcombe Oxenham =

English ecclesiologist, translator and theologian (1829–1888)

- Born: Henry Nutcombe Oxnam; 15 November 1829; Harrow, London
- Died: 23 March 1888 (aged 58); Kensington, London
- Occupations: Theologian, ecclesiologist, author, translator

Henry Nutcombe Oxenham (15 November 1829 – 23 March 1888) was an English ecclesiologist, theologian, author and translator. Originally ordained in the Church of England, he later converted to the Roman Catholic faith and was received into that Church.

== Biography ==
He was born at Harrow School to William Oxnam and Mary Susanna (née Carter), where William Oxnam was a master, and was baptised at Eton, Buckinghamshire on 8 January 1830, where his uncle was Thomas Thellusson Carter. The family name changed from Oxnam to Oxenham in 1834, when Henry was four years old. From Harrow, Oxenham went to Balliol College, Oxford, where he was President of the Oxford Union in Trinity term, 1852. He took Anglican orders in 1854, but became a Roman Catholic in 1857. At first his thoughts turned towards the priesthood, and he spent some time at the London Oratory and at St Edmund's College, Ware. Being unable, however, to surrender his belief in the validity of Anglican orders, he proceeded no further than minor orders in the Roman Church.

In 1863 he made a prolonged visit to Germany, where he studied the language and literature, and formed a close friendship with Döllinger, whose First Age of the Christian Church he translated in 1866. Oxenham was a regular contributor to the Saturday Review. A selection of his essays was published in Short Studies in Ecclesiastical History and Biography (1884), and Short Studies, Ethical and Religious (1885). In 1876, he translated the second volume of Bishop Hefele's History of the Councils of the Church, and published several pamphlets on the reunion of Christendom. His Catholic Doctrine of the Atonement (1865) and Catholic Eschatology and Universalism (1876) are standard works.

He died on 23 March 1888 at Kensington, London, of undisclosed causes, aged 58. He never married.

== Anti-vivisection ==
Oxenham was active in the anti-vivisection movement. He was one of the earliest members of the Victoria Street and International Society for the Protection of Animals from Vivisection. In 1878, he authored "Moral and Religious Estimate of Vivisection" for the Gentleman's Magazine. An obituary in The Animal's Defender and Zoophilist noted that "the anti-vivisection cause has lost a devoted adherent and a powerful champion by the recent death of Rev. Henry Nutcombe Oxenham".

== Selected publications ==
- "Moral and Religious Estimate of Vivisection". Gentleman's Magazine. 245: 713–736. 1878.
