= List of presidents of the Oxford Union =

Past elected presidents of the Oxford Union are listed below, with their college and the year/term in which they served. Iterum indicates that a person was serving a second term as president (which is not possible under the current Union rules).

== Key to colleges ==
- All Souls
- Balliol
- Blackfriars Hall
- Brasenose
- Campion Hall
- Christ Church
- Corpus Christi
- Exeter
- Green Templeton
- Harris Manchester
- Hertford
- Jesus
- Keble
- Kellogg
- Lady Margaret Hall
- Linacre
- Lincoln
- Magdalen
- Mansfield
- Merton
- New
- Nuffield
- Oriel
- Pembroke
- The Queen's
- Regent's Park
- Reuben
- Somerville
- St Anne's
- St Antony's
- St Catherine's
- St Cross
- St Edmund Hall
- St Hilda's
- St Hugh's
- St John's
- St Peter's
- Trinity
- University
- Wadham
- Wolfson
- Worcester
- Wycliffe Hall

== Presidents of the United Debating Society ==
These are the Presidents as listed

- 1823
  - Donald Maclean
  - A. W. Ashley
  - J. C. Colquhoun
  - John Wilson-Patten
  - Thomas Powys
  - John Bramston
  - Henry Chetwynd-Talbot
  - Richard Durnford
- 1824
  - R. C. Dallas
  - E. Vernon-Harcourt
  - Harry Vane
  - T. F. Hodges (Note: Thomas Frederick Amelius Parry Hodges (1801/2 – 27 October 1880) was also a fellow of his alma mater and was vicar of North Clifton with Harby, Nottinghamshire and of Lyme Regis.)
  - Henry Baring
  - Viscount Mahon
  - C. Des Voeux (Note: Charles des Voeux (29 April 1802 – 9 August 1833) was the eldest son of Sir Charles Des Voeux, 2nd Baronet.)
  - James Stuart-Wortley
  - Robert Wilberforce
  - Digby Wrangham
  - A. J. Lewis (Note: Arthur James Lewis (1800/1 in Cannanore 14 November 1865) later became Advocate-General of Bombay.)
  - Hassard Hume Dodgson (Note: Hassard Hume Dodgson (1803/4 – fl. 1872) was a master of the Common Pleas and was the father-in-law of Charles Edward Pollock.)
  - John Chetwynd-Talbot
- 1825
  - Norman Hilton Macdonald
  - H. W. Torrens
  - Samuel Wilberforce
  - Richard Durnford (iterum)
  - W. J. Blake
  - Thomas Vesey
  - E. E. Villiers
  - Charles Murray
  - Walter Trower
  - R. A. Hornby (Note: Robert Vernon Atherton Hornby (1805/6 – September 1857))
  - Frederick Calvert
  - J. R. Wood (Note: John Ryle Wood (1806/7 – 9 November 1886) was later vicar of St John-in-Bedwardine, canon of Worcester Cathedral, and Chaplain to the Duke of Cambridge.)

== Presidents of the Oxford Union Society ==
=== 1826–1850 ===
These are the presidents as listed:

Year	Michaelmas	Hilary	Trinity
1826	—	Hassard Hume Dodgson (Note: Resigned); Digby Wrangham	Richard Durnford; E. E. Villiers (iterum)
1826–27	R. A. Hornby	Norman Hilton Macdonald; Douglas Smith (Note: Douglas Smith (1804/5 – 1829)); Henry Tufnell	J. Pearson (Note: John Pearson (1806/7 fl. 1828), previously educated at Eton College, later became a barrister after graduating from Lincoln's Inn); Edward Twisleton
1827–28	William Courtenay; Herman Merivale	Douglas Smith (iterum)	Thomas Hobhouse; A. Grant
1828–29	Charles Baring	Henry Wilberforce; Thomas Acland	H. W. Moncrieff
1829–30	Henry Manning; Henry Wilberforce (iterum)	Sidney Herbert	James Gaskell
1830–31	James Gaskell; William Gladstone	James Bruce; Joseph Anstice	John Lyall
1831–32	Earl of Lincoln	G. K. Rickards	Roundell Palmer
1832–33	William Ward	Edward Cardwell	Archibald Tait
1833–34	Edward Massie (Note: Edward Massie (1805/6 – fl. 1845) was later a chaplain.)	Robert Lowe; Charles Marriott	William Sinclair (Note: Sinclair attended St Mary Hall, Oxford. Associated with Oriel since 1326, it functioned independently from 1545 to 1902, before being incorporated into Oriel upon the death of its Principal, Drummond Percy Chase. Thus, St Mary Hall's coat of arms is substituted with that of the university itself.)
1834–35	J. Adams (Note: John Adams (1813 – 18 September 1848), of the landed family of Ansty Hall and the eldest half-brother of novelist Henry Cadwallader Adams, later became a barrister-at-law in the Middle Temple.)	William Ward (iterum)	J. M. Capes
1835–36	Edward Cardwell (iterum)	T. Brancker (Note: Thomas Brancker (1812/3 – 11 November 1871) was later rector of St Mary's Church, Limington and prebendary of Wells Cathedral.)	John Cornish
1836–37	W. N. Tilson-Marsh (Note: William Nathaniel Tilson Marsh Lushington Tilson FZS FRGS FRHS (1815/6 – January 1881) was the perpetual curate of St James' Church, Ryde and of St Leonard's Church, St Leonards-on-Sea. His wife was a niece of Charles Morgan, 1st Baron Tredegar.)	Henry Cripps	G. R. Moncrieff (Note: George Robertson Moncreiff (29 January 1817 – fl. 1884), a younger brother of Sir Henry Wellwood-Moncreiff, 10th Baronet, was HM Inspector of Schools from 1850 to 1873.)
1837–38	James Hessey	William Ridley	W. C. Lake
1838–39	Henry Highton	G. R. Moncrieff (iterum)	H. W. Sullivan (Note: Henry William Sullivan (1814/5 – 22 March 1880) was later rector of Yoxall)
1839–40	William Buckley	J. B. Blackett	George Rawlinson
1840–41	C. T. Arnold (Note: Rev. Charles Thomas Arnold (1817/8 – 13 May 1878) was later an assistant master at Rugby School who wrote articles for the Dictionary of Greek and Roman Biography and Mythology.)	R. C. Powles	J. T. B. Landon (Note: James Timothy Bainbridge Landon (1816/7 – fl. 1877) was later vicar of Ledsham, West Yorkshire and canon of York Minster.)
1841–42	Richard Congreve	Melville Portal	Drummond Chase
1842–43	Edward Plumptre	George Bowen	W. H. Scott (Note: William Henry Scott (1819/20 – 17 September 1859) was a grandson of Sir Joseph Scott, 1st Baronet.)
1843–44	John Coleridge	H. M. White (Note: Henry Master White (1820/1 – fl. 1871) was later vicar of Masbrough and, in the Cape Colony, principal of Diocesan College and Archdeacon of Grahamstown.)	John Mackarness
1844–45	George Bowen(iterum)	Alfred Pott	John G. Cazenove
1846–47	Francis Sandford	John Conington	R. J. Simpson (Note: Robert James Simpson (1825/6 – fl. 1886) was vicar of Upton, Buckinghamshire (1867–79), St Clement Danes (1869–79), and St Peter Eltham (1886–?).)
1848–49	S. J. Hulme (Note: Samuel Joseph Hulme (1823/4 – 12 December 1886) was rector of St Martin's Carfax, Oxford and of Bourton-on-the-Water.)	C. H. Stanton (Note: Charles Holbrow Stanton (1825 – fl. 1876) was later admitted to the bar at Lincoln's Inn and became a barrister in the Oxford circuit.)	Earl of Dufferin; W. B. Marriott
1847–48	George Hunt	Walter Congreve (Note: Walter Congreve (1824/5 – fl. 1850))	Montagu Blackett
1848–49	G. R. Portal (Note: George Raymond Portal (28 February 1827 – 3 April 1889), a brother of Sir Wyndham Portal, 1st Baronet, was later rector of Albury, Surrey and of Burghclere.)	F. Meyrick	George Boyle
1849–50	William Milman	J. R. K. Ralph (Note: John Rowe Kelley Ralph (1824 – 5 December 1885) was later a barrister who served on the North Wales and Chester Circuit.)	Edward Knatchbull-Hugessen

=== 1850–1875 ===
Year	Michaelmas	Hilary	Trinity
1850–51	E. B. Lomer (Note: Edward Bridges Lomer (1827/8 – 6 August 1865) was later a barrister-at-law.)	Alexander Mitchell	Henry Smith
1851–52	Frederick Lygon	Walter Shirley	Henry Oxenham
1852–53	C. H. Pearson	J. Fitzgerald (Note: John FitzGerald (1830/1 – fl. 1857) was later vicar of Borden, Kent and Camden Town.)	Benjamin Rogers
1853–54	George Goschen	Arthur Butler	Godfrey Lushington
1854–55	George C. Brodrick	Robert Bartlett (Note: Robert Edward Bartlett (1829/30 – fl. 1876) was later vicar of Great Waltham and his son was the brother-in-law of Edward Bruce Alexander.)	J. H. Bridges (Note: John Henry Bridges (1851/2 – fl. 1876))
1855–56	D. C. Lathbury	Charles Turner	W. F. Wilberforce
1856–57	John Oakley	Philip Eliot	John Mitchinson
1857–58	T. R. Halcombe (Note: Thomas Robert Halcombe (1833/4 – 22 July 1880) was later curate of Addlestone.)	Thomas Fowle	Charles Bowen
1858–59	E. K. Bennet (Note: Edward Kedington Bennet (1833/4 – fl. 1885) was later rector of Bunwell.)	A. V. Dicey	A. O. Rutson
1859–60	Peter Fogg	Edward Moore	H. L. Harrison
1860–61	Francis Beaumont	Kenelm Digby	Thomas Green
1861–62	J. R. Magrath	Auberon Herbert; A. H. Beesly	James Bryce
1862–63	O. W. Tancock	Reginald Smith	Reginald Abbot
1863–64	Alfred Robinson (Note: Alfred Robinson (1840/1 – fl. 1875) was later sub-warden of New College, Oxford.)	William Fearon	Francis Jeune
1864–65	A. A. Clive	Alfred Robinson(iterum)	R. Robinson
1865–66	Courtenay Ilbert	Edward Talbot	George Simcox
1866–67	William Awdry	William Sanday	Lord Francis Hervey
1867–68	James Strachan-Davidson	Reginald Copleston	Edward Talbot (iterum)
1868–69	Mandell Creighton	C. T. Redington	Reginald Copleston (iterum)
1869–70	Charles Fyffe	William Duggan	A. H. Turner
1870–71	John Doyle	Thomas Grose	Herbert James
1871–72	Walter Lock	Annan Bryce	Henry Pope
1872–73	Charles Cruttwell	William M. Sinclair	Ellis Ashmead-Bartlett
1873–74	Robert Mowbray	M. H. Gould	H. H. Asquith
1874–75	H. A. Venables	Thomas Raleigh	Arthur Sloman

=== 1875–1900 ===
Year	Michaelmas	Hilary	Trinity
1875–76	Herbert Paul	George Savery	Alfred Milner
1876–77	Robert Haddon	Dunbar Barton	Viscount Lymington; Arthur Baumann
1877–78	Robert Horton	William St John Brodrick	Robert Germaine
1878–79	Nathaniel Micklem	Edward Poulton	F. R. Burrows
1879–80	Edward Cook	Richard Dawson	B. R. Wise
1880–81	George Curzon	John Sargeaunt	Charles White
1881–82	Edward Horsburgh	John Hamilton	A. N. Cumming
1882–83	Michael Sadler	W. H. Shaw	Halford Mackinder
1883–84	John Pemberton	A. Dyson Williams	William Worsley
1884–85	Cosmo Lang	George Vidal	George Bellewes
1885–86	Robert Cecil	Anthony Hawkins	C. Emmott
1886–87	/ Walter Phillips	Charles Green	C. J. Blacker
1887–88	H. M. Godfray	A. J. McGregor	A. J. Carlyle
1888–89	Arthur Griffith-Boscawen	Spurrier Parmiter	Herbert Snowden
1889–90	George Mortimer	George Peel	Frank Coller
1890–91	Carl Knaus	William Cozens-Hardy	Lord Ampthill
1891–92	A. E. Ripley	John Magee	James Galbraith
1892–93	Robert Charles Phillimore	C. H. Eliot	William Lygon
1893–94	H. W. Liversidge	Lord Balcarres	F. E. Smith
1894–95	Herbert Morrah	Hilaire Belloc	P. J. Macdonell
1895–96	R. C. Phillimore (iterum)	John Simon	Archibald Boyd-Carpenter
1896–97	Francis Hirst	Robert Johnson	James Cleland
1897–98	F. Lenwood	Edmund Bentley	Cyril Garbett
1898–99	L. R. F. Oldershaw	John Buchan	Arthur Steel
1899–1900	G. M. Gathorne-Hardy	Robert Ensor	Raymond Asquith (Note: Killed during the First World War)

=== 1900–1925 ===
Year	Michaelmas	Hilary	Trinity
1900–01	Harold Baker	Algernon Cecil	T. Cuthbertson
1901–02	George Tomlinson	Sandie Lindsay	Eric Macfadyen
1902–03	Herbert du Parcq	Herbert Asquith	F. W. Curran
1903–04	John Brooke	William Temple	W. A. Moore
1904–05	E. S. Jose	John Heath	Alexander Shaw
1905–06	M. H. Woods	H. M. Paul	Henry Lygon
1906–07	Gervais Rentoul	Neville Talbot	Will Gladstone
1907–08	W. S. Armour	Charles Le Quesne	Hugh Hallett
1908–09	M. H. Richmond	Ronald Knox	Edgar Swain
1909–10	Robert Laffan	Robert S. A. Palmer	Leonard Stein
1910–11	A. W. Cockburn	Nathaniel Micklem	Raymond Bevir
1911–12	Philip Guedalla	Frank Griffith	Robert Barrington-Ward
1912–13	G. S. Woodhouse	Walter Monckton	W. J. Bland
1913–14	Godfrey Talbot	Ernest Roberts	Alexander Wedderburn
1914–15	Arthur Wiggin	N/A	N/A
1915–16	N/A	N/A	N/A
1916–17	N/A	N/A	N/A
1917–18	N/A	N/A	N/A
1918–19	N/A	N/A	Leslie Hore-Belisha
1919–20	Thomas Earp	Constantine Gallop	John Russell
1920–21	Beverley Nichols	Alec Beechman	Cecil Ramage
1921–22	Kenneth Lindsay	John Evans	Ralph Carson
1922–23	Edward Marjoribanks	J. Douglas Woodruff	Gordon Bagnall
1923–24	Christopher Hollis	Christopher Scaife	Gerald Gardiner
1924–25	Henry Scrymgeour-Wedderburn	Robert Bernays	Vincent Lloyd-Jones

=== 1925–1950 ===
Year	Michaelmas	Hilary	Trinity
1925–26	Hugh Molson	Gyles Isham	Lindley Fraser
1926–27	Alan Lennox-Boyd	Roger Fulford	John Playfair Price
1927–28	Malcolm Brereton (Note: Killed during the Second World War)	Dingle Foot	Aubrey Herbert
1928–29	Somerset Stopford Brooke	Roger Wilson	Quintin Hogg
1929–30	Michael Stewart	Edgar Lustgarten	J. P. W. Mallalieu
1930–31	John Boyd-Carpenter	John Foot	Geoffrey Masterman Wilson
1931–32	Toby O'Brien	Arthur Irvine	Brian Davidson
1932–33	Christopher Smuts	Frank Hardie	Tony Greenwood
1933–34	Michael Foot	Dosoo Karaka	Keith Steel-Maitland
1934–35	W. G. Murray	David Lewis	James Hickerton
1935–36	Brian Farrell	Ian Harvey	Bill Shebbeare
1936–37	James Brown	Christopher Mayhew	Patrick Anderson
1937–38	Alan Fyfe	Raymond Walton	Philip Toynbee
1938–39	Alan Wood	Edward Heath	Hugh Fraser
1939–40	A. F. Giles (Note: Elected but did not hold office because of war service); Nicholas Henderson	Madron Seligman	Robin Edmonds
1940–41	James Comyn	Indar Bahadoorsingh	Kenneth Riddle
1941–42	Michael Kinchin-Smith	Gershon Hirsch	F. P. R. Hinchliffe
1942–43	James Cameron Tudor	Herbert Clarke	Courtney Blackmore
1943–44	Godfrey le Quesne	Kenneth Lamb	Fernando Henriques
1944–45	Tony Pickford	Alan Gibson; Rudi Weisweiller	Anthony Walton
1945-46	John Long	Basil Wigoder	Anthony Crosland
1946-47	Ronald Brown	Roger Gray	Anthony Wedgwood Benn
1947–48	Peter Kroyer	Clive Wigram	Edward Boyle
1948–49	Seymour Hills	Peter Kirk	Rodney Donald
1949–50	Dick Faber	Uwe Kitzinger	Robin Day

=== 1950–1975 ===
Year	Michaelmas	Hilary	Trinity
1950–51	Godfrey Smith	Jeremy Thorpe	William Rees-Mogg
1951–52	Ivan Yates	Peter Blaker	Howard Shuman
1952–53	Patrick Mayhew	Bryan Magee	John Peters
1953–54	Andrew Cuninghame	Tyrell Burgess	Raghavan N. Iyer
1954–55	Michael Heseltine	Jeremy Isaacs	Anthony Howard
1955–56	Desmond Watkins	Alec Grant	Roy Dixon
1956–57	Edmund Ions	Jeremy Lever	Peter Brooke
1957–58	Brian Walden	Lalith Athulathmudali	Stuart Griffiths
1958–59	Ron Owen	Lakshman Kadirgamar	Anthony Newton
1959–60	Joe Trattner	Ian Lyon	Peter Jay
1960–61	Robert Rowland	Phillip Whitehead	Paul Foot
1961–62	Howard Preece	Hugh Stephenson	John McDonnell
1962–63	Michael Beloff	Girish Karnad	Jeffrey Jowell
1963–64	Anthony Hart	Garth Pratt	Lord James Douglas-Hamilton
1964–65	Eric Abrahams	Neil MacCormick	Tariq Ali
1965–66	Douglas Hogg	Joshua Bamfield	Jeremy Beloff
1966–67	Montek Singh Ahluwalia	Ronald Cohen	Stephen Marks
1967–68	Robert Jackson	Geraldine Jones	William Waldegrave
1968–69	Ian Glick	David Walter	Colin Youlden
1969–70	Gyles Brandreth	Guy Harkin	Stephen Milligan
1970–71	Eric Parsloe	Michael House	Susan Richards
1971–72	Christopher Tookey	Julian Priestley; Pradeep Mitra	Patric Dickinson
1972–73	Philip McDonagh	Michael Austerberry	Colin Maltby
1973–74	David Warren	Simon Walker	Michael Soole
1974–75	Robert McDonagh	Robert Scoble	Victor van Amerongen

=== 1975–2000 ===
Year	Michaelmas	Hilary	Trinity
1975–76	David Soskin	Andrew Bell	Colin Moynihan
1976–77	Richard Norton	Benazir Bhutto	Victoria Schofield
1977–78	Damian Green	Nicholas O'Shaughnessy	John Harrison
1978–79	Daniel Moylan	Alan Duncan	Philip May
1979–80	Michael Crick	Warwick Lightfoot	Nicholas Prettejohn
1980–81	Rupert Soames	Andrew Sutcliffe	Alexandra Jones
1981–82	William Hague	Kevin Brennan	Paul Thompson
1982–83	Christopher Wortley	Hilali Noordeen	Andrew Sullivan
1983–84	Neale Stevenson	Malcolm Bull	Melvyn Stride
1984–85	Laurence Grafstein	Roland Rudd	Neil Sherlock
1985–86	Anthony Goodman	Jeya Wilson	Boris Johnson
1986–87	Angus McCullough	Simon Stevens	Jessica Pulay
1987–88	Anthony Frieze	Michael Gove	Duncan Gray
1988–89	Andrew McCulloch	Adam Bruce	Stefan Green
1989–90	Diana Gerald	Ed Lazarus	Jeremy Quin
1990–91	Melanie Johnson	Oliver Campbell	Damian Hinds
1991–92	Nicholas Edgar	Graeme Halkerston	Adrian Gannon
1992–93	Christopher Hall	James Robertson	Katherine Wade
1993–94	Toby Lewis	Kate Wilson	Peter Gowers
1994–95	Jeremy Green	Robert Palmer	David Pinto-Duschinsky
1995–96	Matt Guy	Jonathan Wolf	Paul Kenward
1996–97	Jennifer Carter-Manning	Rob Harrington	Oli Evans
1997–98	Sam Gyimah	Clare Dixon	Ellie Blagbrough
1998–99	Helen Eastman	Theo Mills	Nicky Black
1999–2000	Ben Seifert	Lucy Aitkens	Jeff Bell

=== 2000–present ===
Year	Term			Ref
Year	Michaelmas	Hilary	Trinity	Ref
2000–01	Richard Silcock	Nick Mason	Amy Harland	
2001–02	Neil Mahapatra	Charlotte Keenan	Karen Price	
2002–03	David Watson	Fraser Campbell	Ambrose Faulks	
2003–04	Marcus Walker	Edward Tomlinson	Georgina Costa	
2004–05	Ruzwana Bashir	Laura Poots	Richard Tydeman	
2005–06	Chris Farmer	Sapana Agrawal	David Powell	
2006–07	James Wise	Theo Roos	Alex Just	
2007–08	Luke Tryl	Emily Partington	Ben Tansey	
2008–09	Josh Roche	Charlie Holt	Corey Dixon	
2009–10	James Dray	Stuart Cullen	Laura Winwood	
2010–11	James Kingston	James Langman	Ashvir Sangha	
2011–12	Isabelle Westbury	Lauren Pringle	Isabel Ernst	
2012–13	Lee Seung-yoon (Note: The first president of East Asian descent, he is the CEO of Byline, a crowdfunded journalism platform.)	Maria Rioumine	Joseph D'Urso	
2013–14	Parit Wacharasindhu	Polina Ivanova	Ben Sullivan	
2014–15	Mayank Banerjee	Lisa Wehden	Olivia Merrett	
2015–16	Charles Vaughan	Stuart Webber	Robert Harris	
2016–17	Noah Lachs	Nikolay Koshikov	Michael Li	
2017–18	Chris Zabilowicz	Laali Vadlamani	Gui Cavalcanti	
2018–19	Stephen Horvath	Daniel Wilkinson	Genevieve Athis	
2019–20	Brendan McGrath (Note: McGrath resigned after a blind student was dragged from a debate event by his ankles by Union security. After the event, McGrath said the student had acted violently, before apologising and resigning.); Sara Dube (acting)	Sara Dube	Mahi Joshi	
2020–21	Beatrice Barr	James Price (Note: Price was the first graduate president of the Union, having graduated in 2013. He was elected after members voted to re-open nominations in a first election and a second election was called. The second election was found to have been hacked, having taken place online due to Covid-19, with over 500 votes made illegitimately. The Standing Committee decided to discard the illegitimate votes and accept the results of the remaining ballots, declaring Price elected.)	Adam Roble	
2021–22	Chengkai Xie	Molly Mantle	Michael-Akolade Ayodeji	
2022–23	Ahmad Nawaz (Note: Nawaz was removed as president in November 2022 after he was forced to resign for missing committee meetings. The Union membership voted 251-164 to uphold Nawaz's automatic resignation and Charlie Mackintosh replaced him as acting president on 18 November 2022.); Charlie Mackintosh (acting)	Charlie Mackintosh	Matthew Dick	
2023–24	Disha Hegde	Hannah Edwards	Louis Wilson (Note: Leo Buckley was initially declared President-Elect, but an election tribunal disqualified him and declared Julia Maranhao-Wong elected. Buckley appealed the decision; in February 2024 it was decided that the role of President-Elect should be left vacant and that the presidency would be offered to the incoming Librarian Louis Wilson.)	
2024–25	Ebrahim Osman-Mowafy (Note: Ebrahim Osman-Mowafy was initially elected, but an election tribunal in June 2024 disqualified him and ordered a recount. Osman-Mowafy was subsequently re-instated.)	Israr Khan	Anita Okunde	
2025–26	Moosa Harraj	Katherine Yang (Note: George Abaraonye was elected as President-Elect; however, a successful no confidence motion removed him from this position before he took office as President. Abaraonye appealed the outcome of this motion; pending its determination, the Returning Officer, Chris Mentis Cravaris, assumed the powers and duties of President under Rule 12. After this failed, Katherine Yang was confirmed to take office in Hilary Term 2026.)	Arwa Hanin Elrayess	
2026–27	Gareth Lim (Note: Catherine Xu was elected President-Elect; however, she was found guilty by a tribunal of electoral fraud for distributing membership cards to non-members. This led to the election being annulled and a re-poll being held, from which Xu was barred. Gareth Lim won the subsequent re-poll and was elected President-Elect for Michaelmas Term 2026.)	Milo Donovan		

== Other notable officeholders ==
The 3rd Marquess of Salisbury was Union secretary in Michaelmas 1848.

Harold Macmillan was secretary of the union in Hilary 1914, then junior treasurer (elected unopposed, which was then very unusual) in Trinity 1914; but for the war he would "almost certainly" have been president.

S. W. R. D. Bandaranaike was treasurer in Trinity 1924.

Humayun Kabir was librarian in 1931.

Roy Jenkins served as librarian and secretary and lost two presidential elections.

Norman St John-Stevas was secretary of the Oxford Union but never became president despite his ambition to be the first person to be president of both Oxford and Cambridge Unions; he had been president of the Cambridge Union during his undergraduate years, before he studied at Oxford.

Ann Widdecombe was treasurer in 1972, after having served as secretary the previous year.

Jacob Rees-Mogg was Librarian in 1990, losing the election for the presidency to future Education Secretary Damian Hinds.

== In fiction ==
- Simon Kerslake (early 1950s), protagonist of the Jeffrey Archer novel First Among Equals, invites sitting prime minister Winston Churchill to propose the motion during Eights Week that "This House Would Rather be a Commoner than a Lord". His future rival, The Hon. Charles Seymour, listens from the floor and resolves to enter politics also. Archer himself was elected to Standing Committee for one term in 1965.
