= Pat McDonagh =

Pat McDonagh may refer to:

- Pat McDonagh (businessman), founder of Supermac's, an Irish fast food franchiser
- Pat McDonagh (sportsman) (born 1957), Irish Olympic rower and bobsledder
- Pat McDonagh (fashion designer) (1934–2014), British fashion designer
- Pat McDonagh (piper) (died 1904), Irish piper

== See also ==
- Patrick McDonagh (1906–?), Scottish footballer
