= John Sargeaunt =

John Sargeaunt (1857–1922) was a noted classical scholar and schoolmaster of whom The Times wrote: "he will be long remembered for his profound scholarship and his genius as a teacher".

== Biography ==
Born in Irthlingborough, Northamptonshire, on 12 August 1857, John Sargeaunt was educated at Bedford School and at University College, Oxford, where he was a Classical Exhibitioner. He was President of the Oxford Union Society in 1881. After Oxford, Sargeaunt became a master at Inverness Royal Academy, and then, in 1885, at Felsted School in Essex. In January 1890, he began teaching at Westminster School, as Master of the Classical Sixth Form. He retired from this post nearly twenty-nine years later, at Christmas 1918, and moved to a small house which he had built at Fairwarp in Sussex.

John Sargeaunt published widely and his work was highly regarded. He died in Hove, Sussex, on 20 March 1922, aged 64, and his death was the subject of a leading article in The Times on 24 March 1922.

== Publications ==
- Annals of Westminster School, Methuen, 1898
- Virgil’s Pastorals in English Verse, Routledge, 1900
- Pope’s Essay on Criticism, Oxford University Press, 1909
- Dryden’s Poems (The Restored Text), Oxford University Press, 1910
- Terence in English Prose, Loeb Classical Library, 1912
- The Trees, Shrubs, and Plants of Virgil, Longman, 1920
- The Pronunciation of English Words Derived from the Latin. Oxford University Press. 1920.
- Westminster Verses, T. Fisher Unwin, 1922
- A History of Bedford School, T. Fisher Unwin, 1925
