= Philip McDonagh =

Irish diplomat and poet

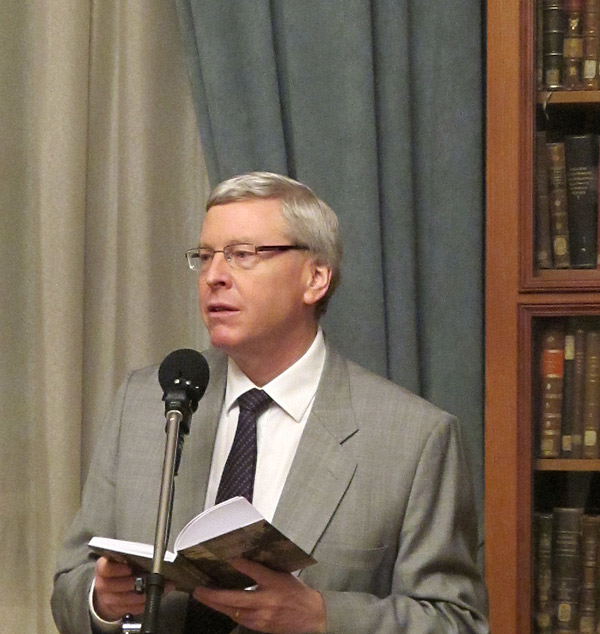
Philip McDonagh reading from his poetry collection at Russia State Library for Foreign Literature, 2011

Philip McDonagh (born 1952) is a poet and former Irish diplomat. His father, Bob McDonagh, and brother, Bobby McDonagh, also served as diplomats.

== Early life ==
McDonagh graduated in Classics from Balliol College, Oxford, where in 1972 he was elected President of the Oxford Union. In a harbinger of his future diplomatic career, during his presidency of the Union, in November 1972, he invited the Irish Prime Minister, Taoiseach Jack Lynch, to debate at the Union. This was in the period after Bloody Sunday ( January 1972) when talks were taking place between the Irish and British which eventually culminated in the Sunningdale Agreement. On the day after the debate Lynch had a working dinner with Ted Heath, at 10 Downing Street. McDonagh's father was at the time head of the Anglo-Irish division at the Irish Department of Foreign Affairs and was among the officials who accompanied Lynch to Britain on that occasion.

== Diplomatic career ==
As Political Counsellor in London McDonagh played a part in the Northern Ireland peace process in the build-up to the Belfast Agreement.

McDonagh served as Ambassador to India (1999-2004), the Holy See (2004-2007), Finland (2007-2009), Russia (2009-2013) and the OSCE(2013-2017).

After retirement from the diplomatic service, he was appointed Senior Fellow at the Edward M. Kennedy Institute, at Maynooth University and, in a parallel appointment, Distinguished Global Fellow at the Center of Theological Inquiry, Princeton University.

In May 2020 he was appointed Director of the newly-founded Centre for Religion, Human Values and International Relations at Dublin City University.

He is a member of the Advisory Council of the Institute for Economics and Peace (Sydney), the Advisory Council of the Institute for Integrated Transitions (Barcelona) and a member of the Steering Committee of the OSCE Academic Network (Hamburg),

== Publications ==
McDonagh's first poetry collection, Carraroe in Saxony, was published in 2003. The following year an expanded volume was published in India, Memories of an Ionian Diplomat. In 2010 The Song the Oriole Sang was published.

McDonagh published an English language translation in 2016 of the verse drama, Gondla, by Nikolai Gumilev. It was staged in several theatres in Ireland that year.

In 2017, he published a stage adaptation of Dostoevsky's Crime and Punishment. It toured in Ireland that year and was also staged in England.

McDonagh was principal author of Religion and Security-Building in the OSCE Context (2018).

With three others he authored The Significance of Religion for Global Diplomacy (2021).
