= Law Latin =

Form of Latin used in legal contexts

Law Latin, sometimes written L.L. or L. Lat., and sometimes derisively referred to as Dog Latin, is a form of Latin used in legal contexts. While some of the vocabulary does come from Latin, much of it stems from English. Law Latin may also be seen as consisting of a mixture of English, French and Latin words superimposed over an English syntax.

Law Latin was the language in which the records of English lawsuits and other causes at law (as distinguished from those at equity and in other prerogative tribunals) were recorded at least until the reign of George II. Under his reign, the Proceedings in Courts of Justice Act 1730 (effective from 1733) mandated that all records of legal proceedings in England were to be made in English rather than Latin. Law Latin was also used as the language of writs, royal charters, letters patent and many other legal instruments. As late as 1867, Law Latin was still in use in England and Scotland for some legal instruments. In South Africa, knowledge of Latin was a requirement in order to join the General Council of the Bar in order to advocate in the courts until 1988 when it was abolished.

== See also ==
- Law French
- List of legal Latin terms
- Traditional English pronunciation of Latin
