= Pat McDonagh (piper) =

- Born: Galway
- Origin: Ireland
- Died: 1904
- Occupation: Piper

Pat McDonagh (died 1904 or 1908) was an Irish piper.

McDonagh was a native of Galway town, where at one point in his life he ran a small shop. He was described as respectable in behaviour, and a very accomplished musician.

Jeremiah O'Donovan, first secretary of the Cork Pipers Club, met him in 1903, thought no one his equal. He prevailed upon McDonagh to participate in the 1903 Feis Ceol, which he won. However he died in the years immediately following.

O'Neill says that "For a man of his rare musical ability his modesty was truly refreshing, and though conscious of his gifts, he was much disinelined to display them away from his own home. No relationship other than that of surname and nativity existed between him and John McDonough, the renowned piper of an earlier generation."
