= Bob McDonagh =

Irish diplomat

Bob McDonagh (23 March 1924 – 3 May 2015) was an Irish diplomat, two of whose sons, Philip McDonagh and Bobby McDonagh, also served in the Irish diplomatic service.

== Early life ==
McDonagh was born in Tralee, but grew up in Sandycove, County Dubin. He attended the Presentation Brothers school in Glasthule and joined the Irish Civil Service as a clerical officer.

== Career ==
When Seán MacBride became head of the Department of External Affairs in 1948, he expanded the department and McDonagh entered as Third Secretary.

An Anglo-Irish Division of the Department of Foreign Affairs was set up for the first time in early 1972 and McDonagh became its head. As such, he was involved closely in talks that eventually led to the Sunningdale Agreement of 1973.

He became Ambassador to the Federal Republic of Germany in 1973.

In 1977 he became Secretary of the Department of Foreign Affairs but it was not a role that suited him. The following year he was replaced as Secretary and was appointed Ambassador to Italy.

In 1983 he was appointed as Ireland's Permanent representative to the United Nations in New York and served in that post until his retirement in 1989.

McDonagh amassed a library of over 1,000 diplomatic biographies in several languages which his family donated to the Irish Department of Foreign Affairs after his death.
