= Bobby McDonagh =

Irish diplomat (born 1954)

Ambassador of Ireland to Italy
- In office August 2013 – July 2017
- President: Michael D. Higgins
- Prime Minister: Enda Kenny; Leo Varadkar
- Preceded by: Pat Hennessy
- Succeeded by: Colm Ó Floinn

Ambassador of Ireland to the United Kingdom
- In office 2009–2013
- President: Mary McAleese; Michael D. Higgins
- Prime Minister: Brian Cowen; Enda Kenny
- Preceded by: David J. Cooney
- Succeeded by: Daniel Mulhall

Ambassador of Ireland to Malaysia
- In office 2000–2001
- President: Mary McAleese
- Prime Minister: Bertie Ahern
- Preceded by: Brendan Lyons
- Succeeded by: Daniel Mulhall

Personal details
- Born: Bobby McDonagh; 29 June 1954 (age 72) Washington D.C., United States
- Citizenship: Irish
- Education: Gonzaga College; Balliol College, University of Oxford
- Occupation: Diplomat

Bobby McDonagh (born 29 June 1954) is a former Irish diplomat.

== Biography ==
He was educated in Gonzaga College, Dublin and graduated from Balliol College, Oxford with a Master of Arts (MA) (Greats/Classics). He was elected President of the Oxford Union in 1974.

He entered the Irish diplomatic service in 1977. His father, Bob McDonagh, and brother, Philip McDonagh, also served as ambassadors in the service.

He is regarded as an expert on European Union affairs, having spent 23 years of his career either in the corridors of Brussels or in the EU division of the Irish Department of Foreign Affairs. This included periods in the Secretariat of the European Parliament, periods in the cabinets of two European Commissioners and a period (2005–2009) as the Irish Permanent Representative to the EU.

He served as Director General of the EU division of the Irish Department of Foreign Affairs (2001–2005).

He was Ambassador of Ireland to the United Kingdom (2009–2013), which included the period of the visit of Queen Elizabeth II to Ireland.

He served as Ambassador of Ireland to Italy (2013–2017) and retired in 2018.

== Publications ==
- "Irish Friends and Friends of Ireland..." London Speeches 2009–2013, (IIEA 2014)
- The IGC: How the Deal was Done-an account of the negotiation of the EU Constitutional Treaty (contained in The Genesis and Destiny of the European Constitution, Bruylant 2007).
- Original Sin in a Brave New World-the Paradox of Europe (IIEA 1997)
