= Mike McDonagh =

Irish humanitarian (1956–2025)

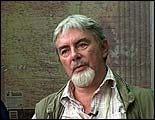
Mike McDonagh (photo by Religion and Ethics Newsletter)

Michael McDonagh (28 January 1956 – 21 June 2025) was an Irish humanitarian and a senior United Nations official working for the United Nations Office for the Coordination of Humanitarian Affairs.

== Biography ==
McDonagh worked as head of the OCHA office in Ethiopia. Previous to joining OCHA, he worked for the Irish NGO, Concern, for more than 20 years, including serving as country director in Laos, Somalia, Angola, Rwanda, Sierra Leone, Liberia, North Korea, Honduras, Albania and Zimbabwe. He joined OCHA in 2004, coordinating Darfur specifically. In 2007, he was appointed head of that office. During his tenure, he advocated for a strong humanitarian response to the Darfur crisis, and drew international attention to the recurrent attacks on humanitarian workers in Darfur and the impact these have on humanitarian aid. After Sudan, McDonagh was head of OCHA-Iraq and OCHA-Libya.

McDonagh died from an aortic aneurysm on 21 June 2025, at the age of 69.

Preceded by Ramesh Rajasingham	Head of the OCHA Office, Sudan; 2005–present	Succeeded by n/a (incumbent)
