= Townhouse (Great Britain) =

Town or city residence of a member of the British nobility or gentry

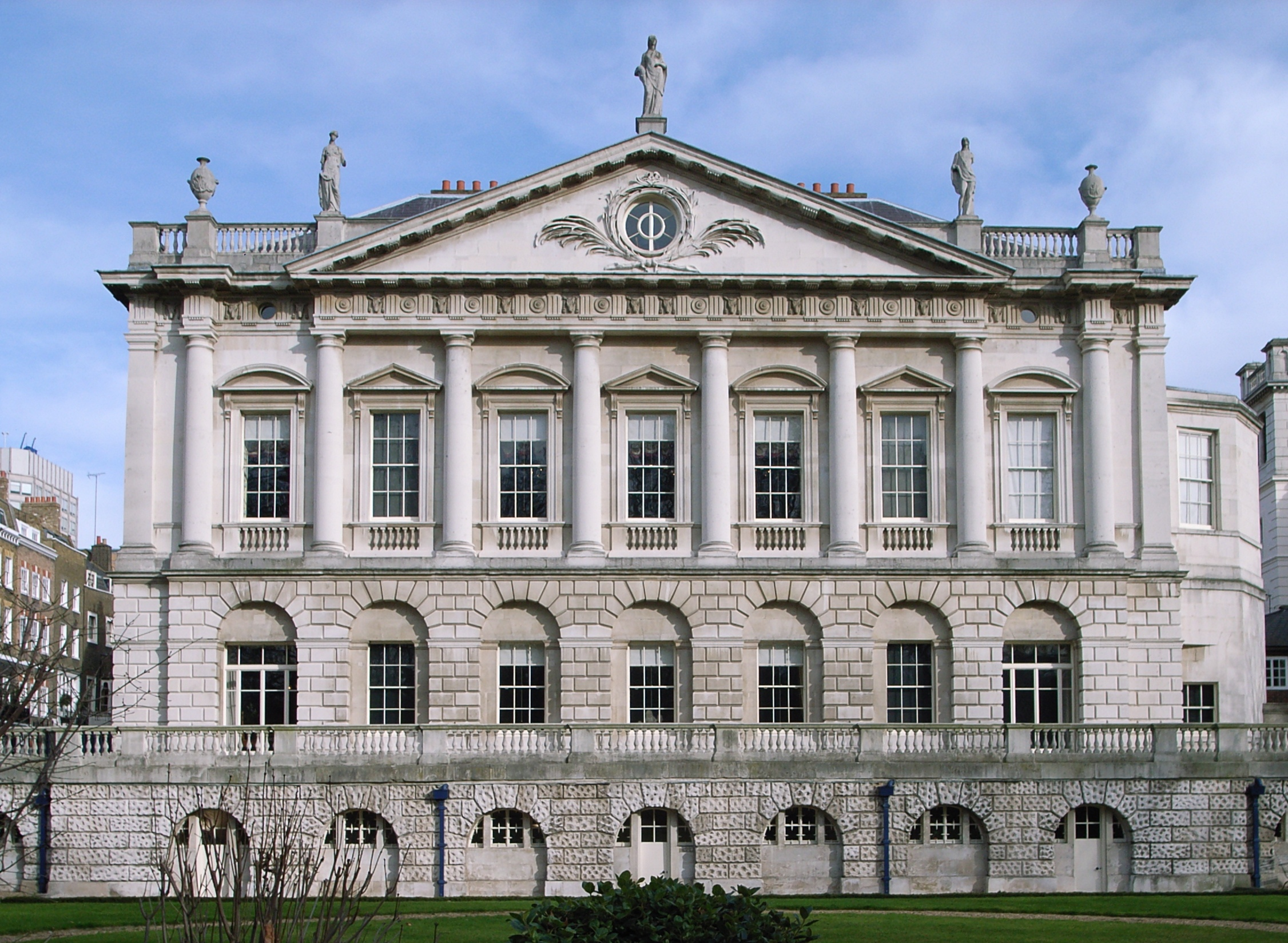
Spencer House in St James's, London, one of the last surviving true townhouses still owned by the noble family that built it, the Spencers, although it is now generally leased out commercially. The corresponding country house is Althorp in Northamptonshire.

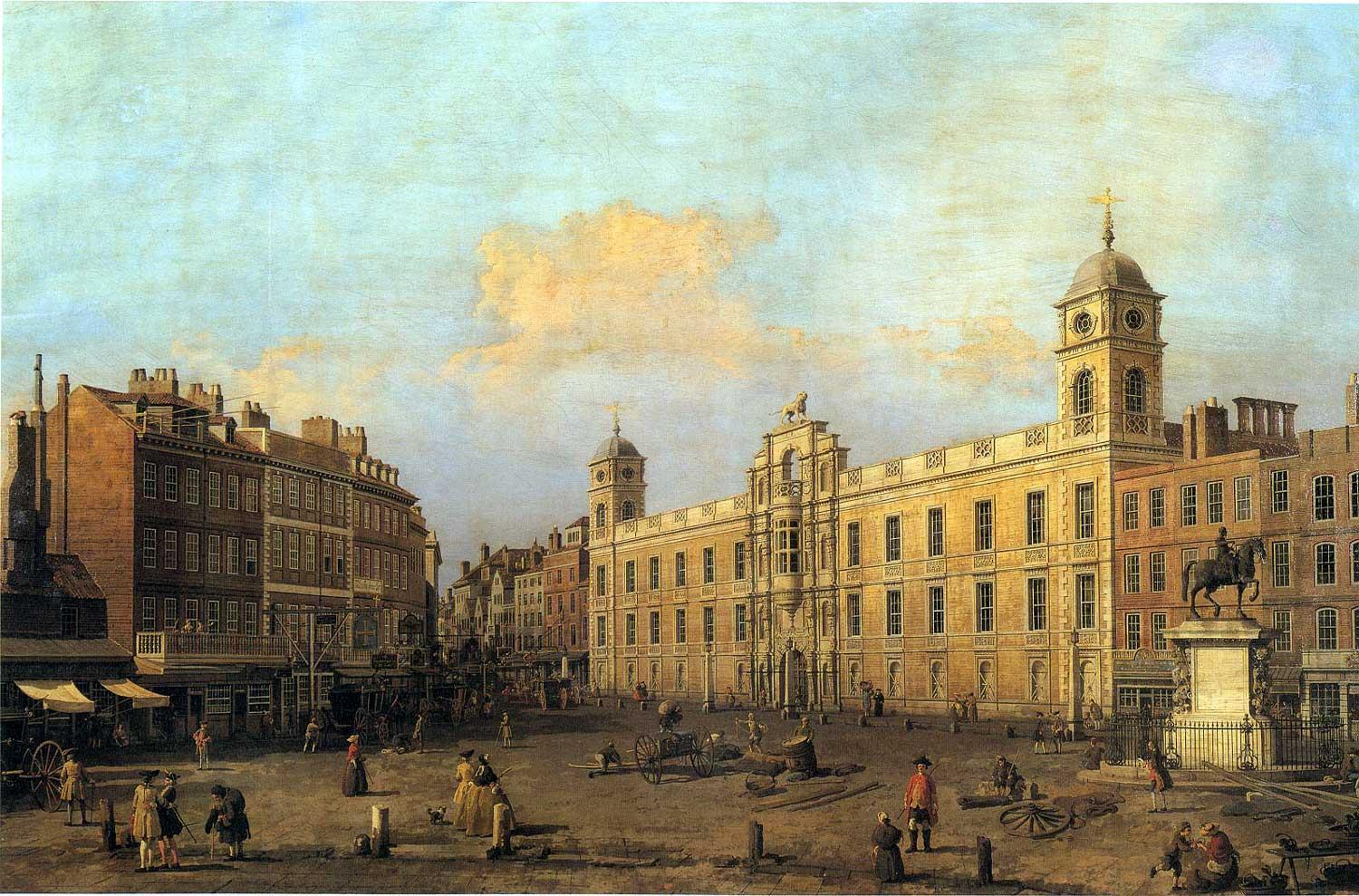
Northumberland House by Canaletto, 1752. The Strand front of Northumberland House, the townhouse of the Dukes of Northumberland. Note the "Percy Lion" atop the central façade.

In British usage, the term townhouse originally referred to the opulent town or city residence (in practice normally in Westminster near the seat of the monarch) of a member of the nobility or gentry, as opposed to their country seat, generally known as a country house or, colloquially, for the larger ones, stately home. The grandest of the London townhouses were stand-alone buildings, comparable to the hôtel particulier, which notably housed the French nobleman in Paris, as well as to the urban domus of the nobiles of Ancient Rome, but many were terraced buildings.

British property developers and estate agents nowadays often use the term "townhouse" for terraced buildings, following the North American usage of the term, to aggrandise modest dwellings and attract buyers who associate the term "terraced house" with the cheap terraced housing built in the Victorian era to accommodate workers. The upmarket Victorian terraced housing, which can be found around many of London's garden squares, seems to be widely forgotten in these circles.

== Background ==
Historically, a town house (later townhouse) was the city residence of a noble or wealthy family, who would own one or more country houses, generally manor houses, in which they lived for much of the year and from the estates surrounding which they derived much of their wealth and political power. Many of the Inns of Court in London served this function; for example, Gray's Inn was the London townhouse of Reginald de Grey, 1st Baron Grey de Wilton (died 1308). A dwelling in London, or in the provincial city of the county in which their country estate was located, was required for attendance on the royal court, attendance in Parliament, for the transaction of legal business and business in general. From the 18th century, landowners and their servants would move to a townhouse during the social season when balls and other society gatherings took place.

From the 18th century, most townhouses were terraced; it was one of the successes of Georgian architecture to persuade the rich to buy terraced houses, especially if they were in a garden square. Only a small minority of them, generally the largest, were detached; even aristocrats whose country houses had grounds of hundreds or thousands of acres often lived in terraced houses in town. For example, the Duke of Norfolk was seated at Arundel Castle in the country, while from 1722 his London house, Norfolk House, was a terraced house in St James's Square, albeit one over 100 feet (30 metres) wide. Anciently the Dukes of Norfolk also had a townhouse, more properly a ducal palace, in the City of Norwich, the capital of the County of Norfolk, which was greatly enlarged by Thomas Howard, 4th Duke of Norfolk (died 1572), whose London townhouse was then the London Charterhouse just outside of the northern wall of the City of London, renamed "Howard House".

Contemporary developers continue to build townhouses, which often have a garage at street level with habitable rooms on the upper floors.

== England ==
=== London ===
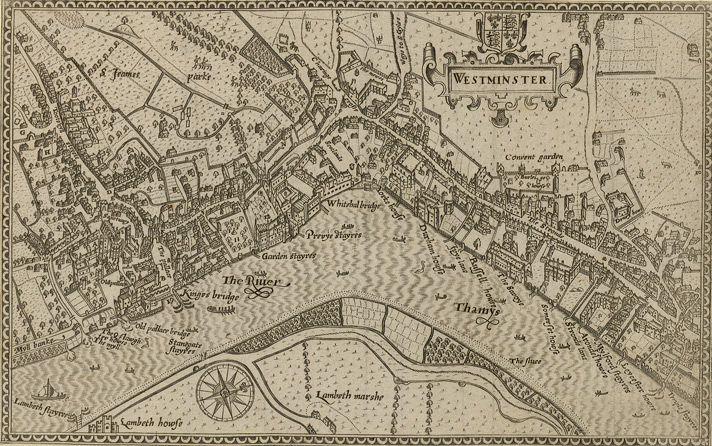
1593 Norden's map of Westminster shows and names many grand London townhouses on the Strand: Yorke House, Durham House, Russell House, Savoy Palace, Somerset House, Arundel House, Leicester House, all downstream from Whitehall Palace. Lambeth Palace on the opposite bank is marked as "Lambeth Howse".

In the Middle Ages, the London residences of the nobility were generally situated within the walls or boundary of the City of London, often known as "Inns", as the French equivalents are termed hôtel. For example, Lincoln's Inn was the town house of the 3rd Earl of Lincoln, and Gray's Inn was a manor held by the 1st Baron Grey de Wilton. At that time the Tower of London, within the city, was still in use as a royal palace. They gradually spread onto the Strand, the main ceremonial thoroughfare from the city to the Palace of Westminster, where parliamentary and court business were transacted. Areas such as Kensington and Hampstead were countryside hamlets outside London until the 19th century, so mansions in these areas, such as Holland House, cannot be considered as true historical townhouses. Bishops also had London residences, generally termed palaces, listed below.

The greatest residence on the Strand was the Savoy Palace, residence of John of Gaunt, Duke of Lancaster, the richest man in the kingdom in his age and the father of King Henry IV. His chief seat was Bolingbroke Castle in Lincolnshire. The Strand had the advantage of frontage to the River Thames, which gave the nobles their own private landing places, as had the royal palaces of Whitehall and Westminster and, further out from the city, Greenwich and Hampton Court. The next fashion was to move still further westwards to St James's, to be near the Tudor royal court. In the 18th century, Covent Garden was developed by the Duke of Bedford on his Bedford Estate, and Mayfair by the Grosvenor family on their Grosvenor Estate. The final fashion before the modern era was for a residence on the former marshland of Belgravia, on the southern part of the Grosvenor Estate, developed after the establishment of Mayfair by the Duke of Westminster. Many aristocratic townhouses were demolished or ceased to be used for residential purposes after the First World War, when the scarcity and greater expense of domestic servants made living on a grand scale impractical. The following examples, most of which are now demolished, are comparable to the Parisian hôtel particulier:

==== Ducal residences ====
- Apsley House, Duke of Wellington
- Argyll House (Dukes of Argyll)
- Bourdon House; Hugh Grosvenor, 2nd Duke of Westminster
- Bridgewater House, Westminster
- Buckingham House (now Buckingham Palace)
- Cambridge House
- Chandos House, 2 Queen Anne Street, Marylebone; 3rd Duke of Chandos
- Clarence House, the residence of the late Queen Elizabeth the Queen Mother and now the residence of King Charles III
- Devonshire House (formerly on Piccadilly, opposite present Ritz Hotel. Formerly Berkeley House)
- Grosvenor House (replaced by eponymous hotel); see also Peterborough House
- Lombard House (formerly Sunderland House) (Charles Spencer-Churchill, 9th Duke of Marlborough and Consuelo Vanderbilt, Duchess of Marlborough
- Marlborough House, once a royal residence, now the Commonwealth Secretariat
- Montagu House, Bloomsbury (Dukes of Montagu)
- Montagu House (Dukes of Buccleuch)
- Norfolk House
- Northumberland House (demolished)
- Richmond House, built c.1660 by Charles Stewart, 3rd Duke of Richmond (of Cobham Hall in Kent) on the site of the bowling green of the Palace of Whitehall.
- Rutland House (Duke of Rutland)
- Somerset House, Park Lane (built 1769–70; demolished 1915)
- Suffolk Place, Southwark (Duke of Suffolk)

==== Other secular houses ====
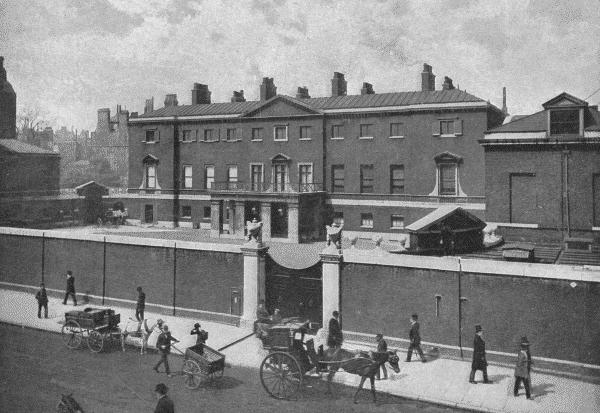
Devonshire House, Piccadilly, in 1896

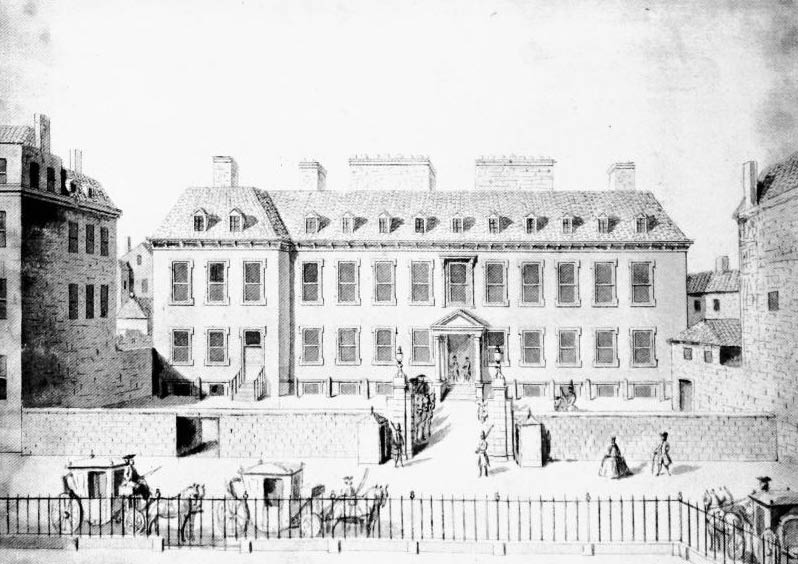
Leicester House on Leicester Fields, 1748

- The Albany
- Baynard's Castle, City of London, Earls of Pembroke 1551–1666
- Berkeley House, residence of Baron Berkeley of Stratton (a junior branch of Baron Berkeley of Berkeley Castle in Gloucestershire), seated at Bruton Abbey in Somerset, was on the site of Bruton Street, Stratton Street and Berkeley Square in Mayfair, and later became Devonshire House.
- Berkeley's Inn, Baynard's Castle, City of London, town house of Thomas de Berkeley, 5th Baron Berkeley (1353–1417), which he gave in his will to Robert Knollis, a citizen of London.
- Bedford House
- Burlington House (now home of the Royal Academy)
- Chesterfield House (demolished 1937, now eponymous Mayfair block of flats)
- Chudleigh House, Knightsbridge, Westminster, later called Kingston House
- Clarendon House
- Crewe House, Curzon Street, Mayfair, currently the Saudi Arabian embassy
- Dorchester House
- Dudley House, London
- Essex House
- Forbes House
- Harrington House formerly the London residence of the Earl of Harrington
- Hertford House, Cannon Row, home of Edward Seymour, 1st Earl of Hertford (1539–1621), son of the first builder of Somerset House. The present Hertford House in Manchester Square, home of the Wallace Collection, was built by one of his very distant cousins.
- Hungerford House, residence of Baron Hungerford until 1669. It later became the site of Hungerford Market and then Charing Cross railway station
- Kingston House, Knightsbridge, Westminster, formerly called Chudleigh House
- Knyvet House, residence of Thomas Knyvet, 1st Baron Knyvet (died 1622); one of three houses merged to form 10 Downing Street
- Lancaster House
- Lansdowne House
- Leicester House, Westminster
- Londonderry House (formerly on Piccadilly)
- Pembroke House, Whitehall
- Peterborough House, Millbank, Westminster.
- Somerset House, Strand
- Spencer House, formerly the London residence of the Earls Spencer
- Stratford House, built 1770–66 by Edward Stratford, 2nd Earl of Aldborough.
- Wentworth House, 5, St James's Square, built in 1748–51 by William Wentworth, 2nd Earl of Strafford, to the design of Matthew Brettingham The Elder. in 1984 it was the Libyan "People's Bureau", gunshots from which caused the murder of Yvonne Fletcher.

==== Episcopal palaces ====
- Ely Palace (Bishop of Ely)
- Arundel House (Bishop of Bath and Wells)
- Durham House (Bishop of Durham)
- Fulham Palace (Bishop of London)
- Lambeth Palace (Archbishop of Canterbury)
- Winchester Palace (Bishop of Winchester), Southwark;
- Rochester House (Bishop of Rochester), Southwark;
- Waverley House (Abbot of Waverley), Southwark;
- York House (Archbishop of York)

=== English provinces ===
Whilst most English examples of the townhouse occur in London, provincial cities also contain some historical examples, for example Bampfylde House (destroyed in World War II) in Exeter, the county seat of Devon, the townhouse of Baron Poltimore of the Bampfylde family, whose main country seat was Poltimore House in Devon. Also in Exeter was Bedford House, also demolished, the town residence of the Duke of Bedford who resided principally at Woburn Abbey in Bedfordshire but required a base in the West Country from which to administer his vast estates there.

== Scotland ==
=== Edinburgh ===
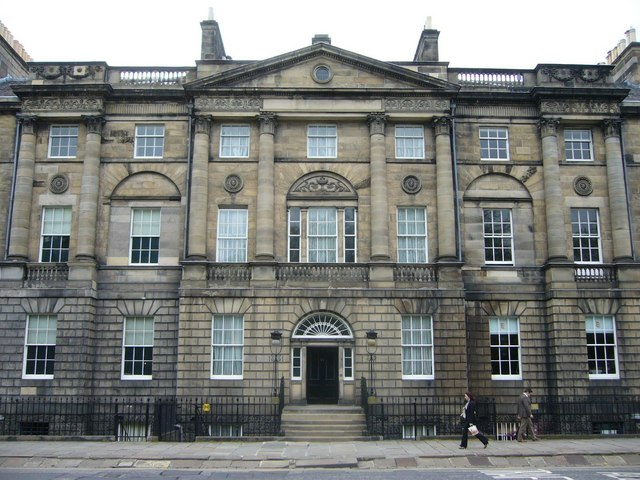
Bute House, Edinburgh

- Bute House – former residence of the Marquess of Bute in Edinburgh's Charlotte Square, now the official residence of the First Minister of Scotland
- Dundas House – former Edinburgh home of Sir Lawrence Dundas, now the principal branch of the Royal Bank of Scotland
- John Knox House – 15th-century townhouse on the Royal Mile
- Old Moray House – 17th-century dwelling of the Earls of Moray in the Canongate
- Queensberry House – bought in 1689 by William Douglas, 1st Duke of Queensberry, now incorporated into the new Scottish Parliament Building and housing the office of the Presiding Officer
- The Georgian House, Edinburgh – restored 18th-century townhouse which is open to the public

== Ireland ==
=== Dublin ===
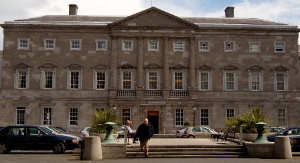
Leinster House, 18th century Dublin townhouse of the Duke of Leinster. It is now the seat of parliament.

- Iveagh House – Dublin residence of the Guinness family, now contains the headquarters of the Department of Foreign Affairs and Trade
- Leinster House in Dublin – residence of the Duke of Leinster (Ireland's premier duke) and now the seat of Oireachtas Éireann, the Irish parliament.
- Powerscourt House – Dublin residence of Viscount Powerscourt, a prominent Irish peer. It was sensitively converted into an award-winning shopping centre in the 1980s. (See an image of one of its decorated ceilings here.)

Georgian Dublin consisted of five Georgian squares, which contained the townhouses of prominent peers. The squares were Merrion Square, St Stephen's Green, Fitzwilliam Square, Ruthland Square (now called Parnell Square) and Mountjoy Square. Many of the townhouses in these squares are now offices while some have been demolished.

== See also ==
- English country house
- Great house
- Manor house
- Hôtel particulier, similar urban stately house in France
- Domus, similar urban stately house in Ancient Rome
- List of house types
