= Parsons Green (disambiguation) =

Parsons Green is a place in the London Borough of Hammersmith and Fulham.

Parsons Green may also refer to:

- Parsons Green (The green), an open space in that borough
- Parsons Green tube station, a London Underground station also in that borough
