= Barbara Boxall =

British magazine editor

- Born: 14 August 1932; Feltham, West London, England
- Died: 14 March 2017 (aged 84); Tenerife, Spain
- Other name: Barbie
- Occupations: Magazine editor and writer
- Known for: Editor of Woman magazine, 1964–1975

Barbara Boxall (née Buss; 14 August 1932 – 14 March 2017) was a British magazine editor and writer who spent several decades contributing to women's magazines. She served as the editor of Woman magazine from 1964 to 1975 when the weekly was transitioning from covering mainly fashion, cooking, and homemaking to a wider range of issues of interest to women such as domestic violence and sex advice. During her tenure, Woman magazine was considered "the biggest-selling women's magazine in the UK."

== Early life and education ==
Barbara Buss was born in Feltham, West London, England, and attended London's Lady Margaret School.

== Career ==
In 1952, Boxall began working as a secretary at Good Taste magazine, later becoming a writer at the publication. She then worked in editorial roles at a series of different women's magazines: In 1956 she landed at Woman & Beauty, in 1957 she moved to Woman, in 1959 she arrived at Woman's Illustrated, and in 1961 she worked at Woman's Realm.

In 1964, Boxall returned to Woman to become its editor, leading a staff of about 120 people. At the time, Woman had a weekly circulation of 4 million. The magazine, under Boxall's direction, explored both lighter subjects (such as knitting and infant care) and more complex topics (including women's liberation and abortion). Readers frequently turned to the magazine and its editors for advice, submitting 1,000 letters a day and reaching out regularly by phone. When Boxall left Woman in 1975, the publication was facing growing competition from other women's magazines, such as Cosmopolitan.

During her career, Boxall also served as fiction editor of the monthly Woman's World magazine, developing the work of writers such as Frances Fyfield (author of the Helen West series of crime novels), and as cookery editor of a sex magazine called Personal.

== Personal life ==
She was married to Lewis Boxall, a one-time press officer at an oil company who died in 1983. Her friends called her "Barbie."

== Death ==
Boxall died on 14 March 2017, while holidaying in Tenerife, Spain.
