= Nadine Baylis =

British stage and costume designer (1940–2017)

- Born: Nadine Paula Ann Baylis; 15 June 1940
- Died: 3 November 2017 (aged 77)
- Education: Lady Margaret School, Central School of Art and Design
- Occupations: Stage and costume designer
- Known for: "set the standard for modern dance costume"
- Parent(s): Alice (nee Down) and Sydney Baylis

Nadine Paula Ann Baylis (15 June 1940 – 3 November 2017) was a British stage and costume designer, who "set the standard for modern dance costume".

== Early life ==
Nadine Baylis was born in London, the daughter of Alice (nee Down) and Sydney Baylis, who ran a car hire business, and then a pub in Shepherd's Bush, west London. She went to Lady Margaret School, in Parsons Green. Baylis was educated at London's Central School of Art and Design.

== Career ==
Early in her career, Baylis worked with Ralph Koltai. She was closely associated with Ballet Rambert, and first worked with them in 1965, and the ballets of Glen Tetley.

== Later life ==
Baylis lived at Scotsgrove, Thame, Buckinghamshire. SHe died on 3 November 2017.

== Selected productions (as designer) ==
- Ziggurat (Ballet Rambert, 1967)
- Embrace Tiger and Return to Mountain (Ballet Rambert, 1968)
- Field Figures (Royal Ballet, 1970)
- Sacre du printemps (Munich State Opera, 1974)
- The Tempest (Ballet Rambert, 1979)
- Alice (National Ballet of Canada, 1986)
- Orpheus (Australian Ballet, 1987)
- Oracle (National Ballet of Canada, 1994)
- Michael Corder's Romeo and Juliet (1992) for the Norwegian National Ballet
- London Contemporary Dance Theatre's The Phantasmagoria in 1987
- Ben Stevenson's Alice in Wonderland (1992) for Houston Ballet
