= Peterborough House =

Coordinates: 51.493°N 0.126°W

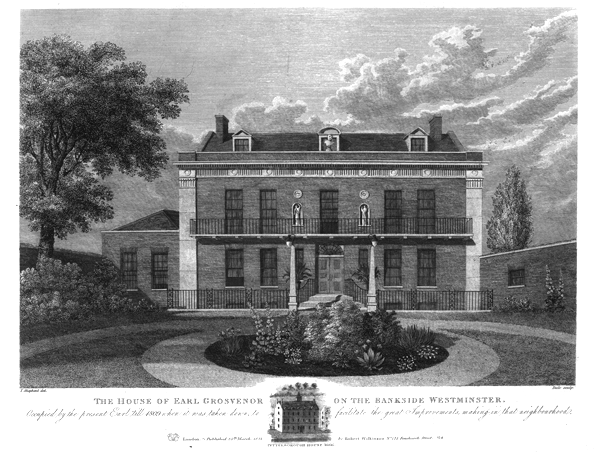
Peterborough House, 19th century engraving of a 1666 illustration

Peterborough House (alias Millbank House, later Grosvenor House), on the south-west side of Parsons Green, near Eel Brook Common, was a London townhouse owned by the Mordaunt family, Earls of Peterborough and later by the Grosvenor family. It was the most westerly townhouse in the City of Westminster.

== History ==
The mansion was built by John Mordaunt, 1st Earl of Peterborough and remained the property of his descendants until the death in 1735 of Charles Mordaunt, 3rd Earl of Peterborough. It was then purchased by a member of the Grosvenor family. It has been erroneously stated that it was purchased or built in 1660 by Alexander Davis of the adjoining manor of Ebury, whose sole daughter and heiress, Mary Davis, in 1676 married Sir Thomas Grosvenor, 3rd Baronet (1655–1700), and was the mother of Sir Richard Grosvenor, 4th Baronet (1689–1732) who inherited the house, and further vast property in London, in right of his mother. However Pennant (1793) stated: "that here, in his boyish days, he had often experienced the hospitality of Sir Robert Grosvenor (i.e. the 6th Baronet (1695–1755), younger brother of 4th and 5th baronets) and that this house came by purchase of one of his family (doubtless his maternal grandfather) from the Mordaunts Earls of Peterborough". In Hollar's four sheet View of London and Westminster, published in 1666, the mansion is clearly shown with the name "Peterborough House" under it, "a distinction not very likely to be given, had the Earl of Peterborough only been tenant to the Davis family, and not the ostensible proprietor himself".

Before 1708 it had been let to Mr. Bull, a merchant, at which time the Earl of Peterborough was serving his country in Spain, and in the years 1710 and 1711 was employed on an embassy to Turin, and other Italian courts. "These engagements rendered an expensive establishment at home to him quite unnecessary".

It was whilst living here, in 1735, that Charles Mordaunt, 3rd Earl of Peterborough (d.1735), was privately married to his second wife, Mrs. Anastasia Robinson, the celebrated contralto vocalist. He died the same year, after which the house was acquired and rebuilt by the Grosvenor family.

Sir Robert Grosvenor, 6th Baronet resided in this house until 1755 after which time it was inhabited by John Delaval, 1st Baron Delaval, and Mr. Symmons. Lord Delaval then had it in his own occupation, and occasionally lived in it for nearly 20 years, until 1809, when it was demolished to facilitate the redevelopment of Millbank by the Grosvenor Estate.

Peterborough House and grounds occupied about seven acres, bounded on the east by the River Thames on the south by the former estate of the Marquess of Salisbury, later owned by the UK Government, on the west by Tothill Fields, owned by the Dean and Chapter of Westminster Abbey, and on the north by the Horseferry Road, originally leading from the fields to the ferry to Lambeth. In 1822 the estate was leased by the Grosvenor Estate to John Johnson, who in 1822 was "considerably improving this quarter of the Metropolis, by forming new streets, etc."

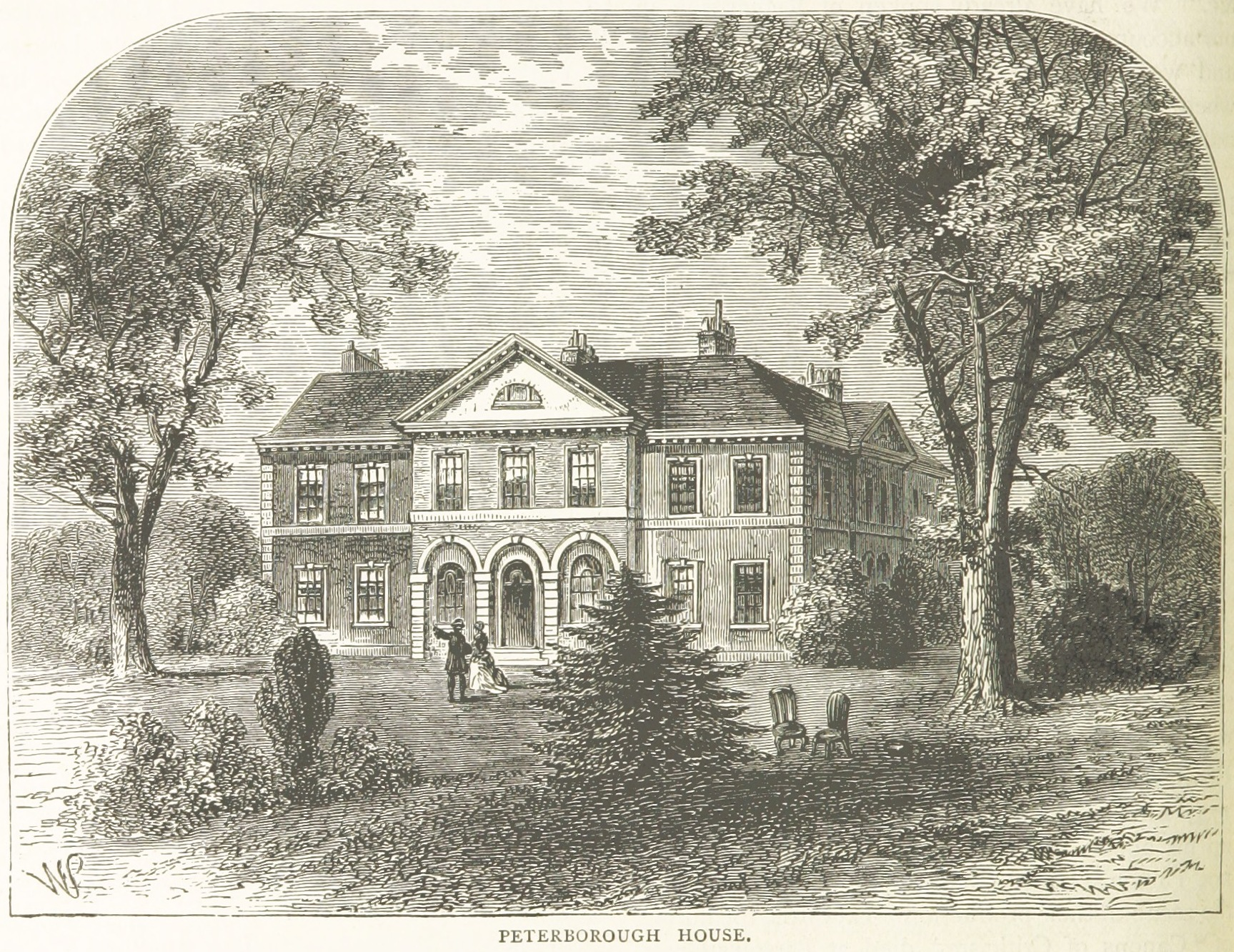
Peterborough House

Thomas Pennant in his Some Account of London related of Peterborough House (by then "Grosvenor House"):

"Here, in my boyish days, I often experienced the hospitality of the late Sir Robert Grosvenor, its worthy owner, who enjoyed it, by the purchase by one of his family from the Mordaunts, Earls of Peterborough. All the rest of his vast property about London devolved on him in right of his mother, Mary, daughter and heiress of Alexander Davies, of Ebury, in the County of Middlesex. I find, in the plan of London by Hollar, a mansion on this spot under the name of Peterborough House. It probably was built by the first Earl of Peterborough. It was inhabited by his successors, and retained its name till the time of the death of that great but irregular genius, Charles, Earl of Peterborough, in 1735."

Pennant also referred to the mansion as "Millbank House", which name is corroborated by an entry in the minutes of the Vestry of St John's Church, Westminster. On 28 February 1812, a committee appointed to visit the parish boundaries at Millbank reported an alteration of the public footway in front of the site where Lord Grosvenor's house "called Millbank House formerly stood", apparently made under section 51 of the Vauxhall Bridge Act 1809 (49 Geo. 3. c. cxlii). This is the first mention of the bridge in the Vestry minutes. According to the act the footpath should not have been closed until "each branch road from the intended bridge through the forecourt of Earl Grosvenor's house should have been completed." According to Dod's Peerage Robert Grosvenor, 1st Baron Ebury was born at Millbank House, Westminster, on 24 April 1801.

This mansion was the subject of a witty joke made by Joe Miller (1684–1738) in his jest book under the title of "high living" and referencing the house's position as the most westerly in Westminster: "Peterborough House, which is the very last in London one way, being rebuilt, a gentleman asked another 'who lived in it'? His friend told him 'Sir Robert Grosvenor.' 'I don't know,' said the first, 'what estate Sir Robert has, but he ought to have a very good one; for nobody lives beyond him in the whole town.'"

Another joke is recorded as follows: As the dramatist and poet William Congreve (1670–1729) was being rowed in a ferry up the Thames at Millbank, the waterman remarked that, owing to its bad foundation, Peterborough House had sunk a story. "No friend," said Congreve, "I rather believe it is a story raised."

== Sources ==
- Wilkinson, Robert, Londina Illustrata: Graphic and Historical Memorials of Monasteries, Churches, Chapels, Schools, Charitable Foundations, Palaces, Halls, Courts, Processions, Places of Early Amusement, and Modern Present Theatres, in the Cities and Suburbs of London and Westminster, Volume I, 1819–1825; with 1666 engraving of Peterborough House .
- Smith, J.E., St John the Evangelist, Westminster: Parochial Memorials, Westminster, 1892, pp. 355–8,362
