= Laura Barnett =

British journalist and author

Laura Barnett (born 1982) is a British journalist, author and theatre critic.

== Early life ==
Barnett was educated at Lady Margaret School in Parsons Green, Fulham, London, followed by Spanish and Italian at Clare College, Cambridge, and newspaper journalism at City, University of London.

== Career ==
Barnett has written for The Guardian, The Observer, The Daily Telegraph and Time Out.

In 2014, Barnett published Advice from the Players, collected advice from actors for those hoping to pursue a theatrical career. It is being translated into 14 languages.

Her first novel was The Versions of Us. It sold over 240,000 copies in the UK, and has been translated into 25 languages.

Her second novel is Greatest Hits. Her third will be Salvage.

== Selected publications ==
- Advice from the Players (Nick Hern Books, 2014)
- The Versions of Us (Weidenfeld & Nicolson, 2016)
- Greatest Hits (Weidenfeld & Nicolson, 2017)
- Salvage (TBA)

== Personal life ==
Barnett is married, and lives in London.
