= Blue Action Fund =

Foundation for ocean protection

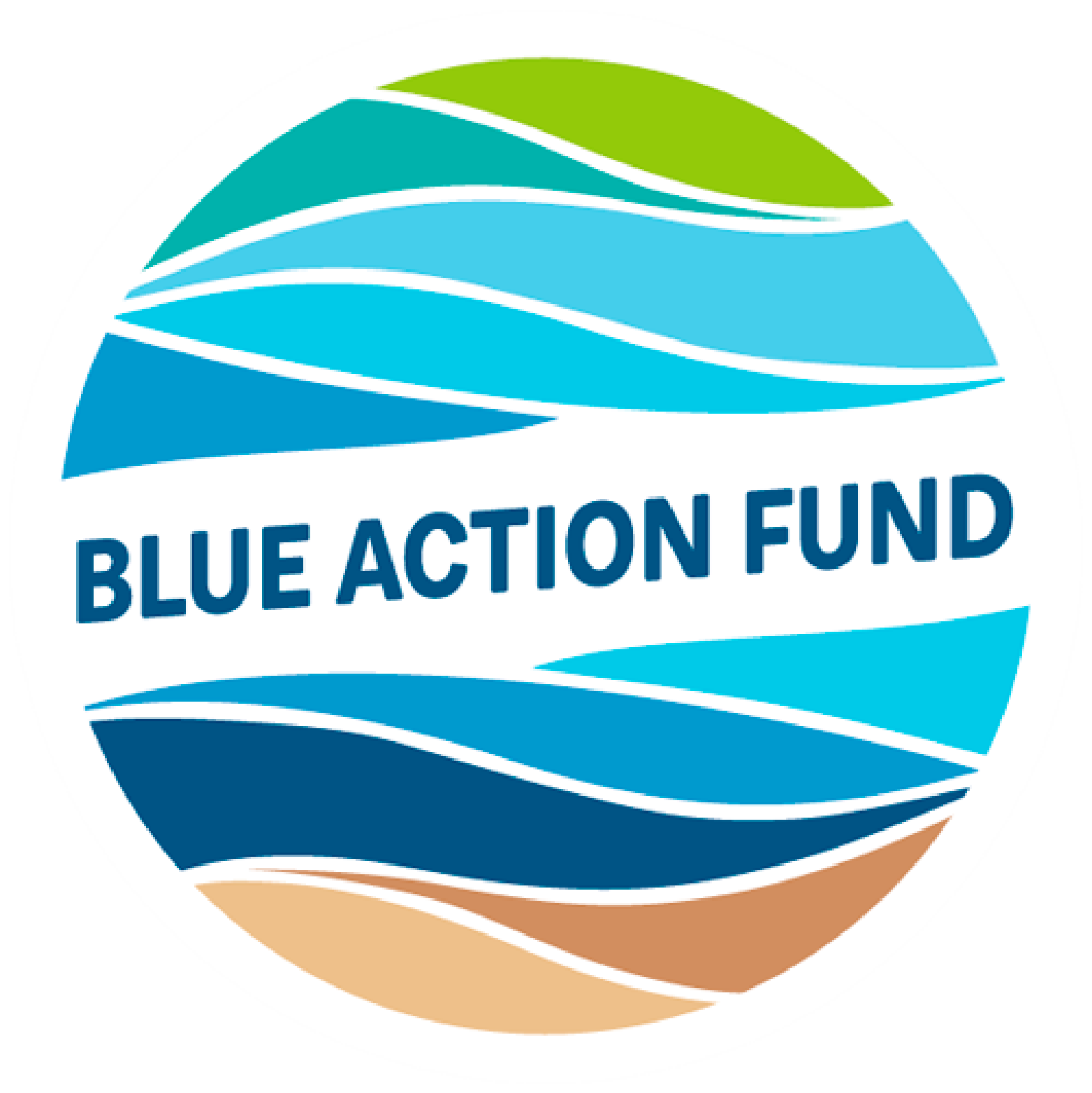
- Formation: 2016; 10 years ago
- Type: Nonprofit
- Legal status: Foundation constituted under German civil law
- Purpose: Marine conservation and improvement of coastal livelihoods
- Headquarters: Friedrich-Ebert-Anlage 36, Frankfurt am Main, Germany
- Coordinates: 50.1119775°N 8.6544056°E
- Region served: Africa, Latin America and Asia
- Website: www.blueactionfund.org

Blue Action Fund is a foundation for the protection of oceans and coasts. It funds projects that contribute to the United Nations Sustainable Development Goal 14, as well as to the Aichi Biodiversity Target 11 for global biodiversity conservation. Blue Action Fund is based in Frankfurt am Main, Germany.

== Activity ==
The purpose of Blue Action Fund's work is to serve "the intensification of coastal and marine protection in developing countries." In doing so, the foundation aims to protect biodiversity and the livelihoods of coastal fishers in regions of Africa, Latin America and Asia. To pursue this aim, Blue Action Fund works with non-governmental organisations to designate and manage protected areas and support sustainable use of coastal and marine resources. Funded projects are selected through regular public calls for proposals. By 2019, funded projects already supported 195,000 square kilometres of marine protected area. In 2021, Blue Action Fund supported 17 projects in 17 countries with a funding volume of more than EUR 42 million.

== Partners ==
Blue Action Fund is funded by the German Federal Ministry for Economic Cooperation and Development through KfW Development Bank, the Swedish Ministry of Foreign Affairs through the Swedish International Development Cooperation Agency (Sida), the Agence Française de Développement (AFD), the Norwegian Agency for Development Cooperation (Norad), Irish Aid, and the Green Climate Fund. In addition, IUCN is a strategic partner of Blue Action Fund.

== Structure ==
Blue Action Fund is a foundation constituted under civil law, with its registered office in Frankfurt am Main, and Programme Office in Berlin.

The foundation's constituent bodies are the management board, the supervisory board and the Founder (German Federal Ministry for Economic Cooperation and Development and KfW Development Bank). Markus Knigge is executive director and chair of the management board.

== History ==
Blue Action Fund was established in 2016 by the German Federal Ministry for Economic Cooperation and Development, and KfW Development Bank. The Fund is a key contribution to the Ministry of Development's 10 Point Plan for ocean protection. Blue Action Fund was registered as a voluntary commitment by Germany and Sweden at the first United Nations World Ocean Conference in 2017.
