= Parsons Green (The green) =

Small area of former common land in London, England

Coordinates: 51.473°N 0.200°W

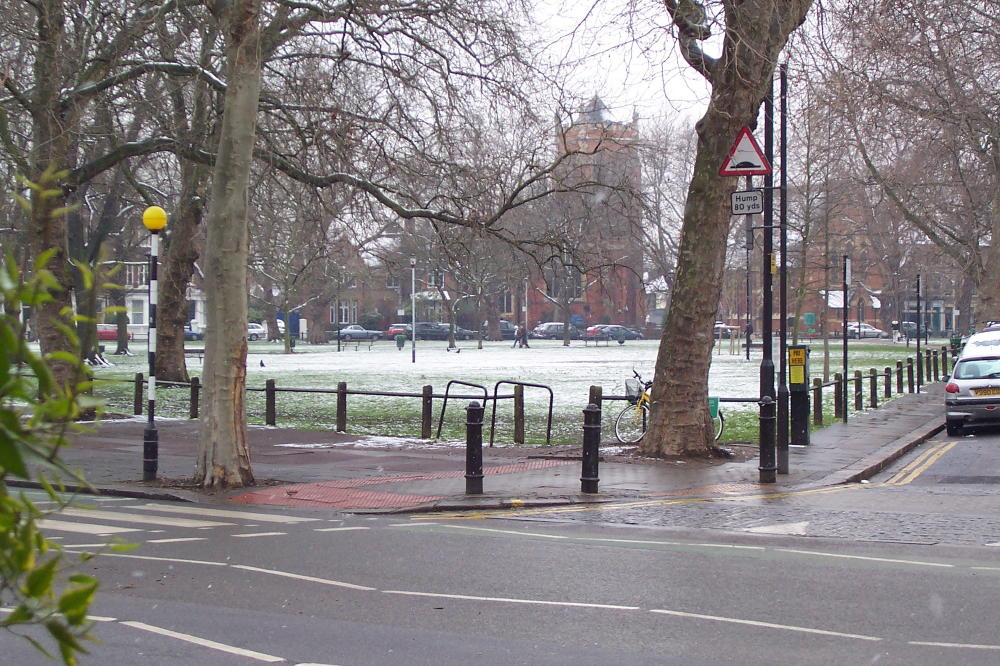
The green at Parsons Green in winter 2004.

Parsons Green is a relatively small triangle of former common land in the Parsons Green area of the London Borough of Hammersmith and Fulham. It is named after the rectors of the parish of Fulham whose residence once adjoined this patch of land and subsequently the name was adopted for the district. From the late 17th-century onwards, the area surrounding the green became the focus for fine houses and grounds built by merchants and the gentry within easy distance of London, yet in a more salubrious setting than the urban environs. A number of Georgian houses have survived, some of them replacing earlier Tudor and Elizabethan buildings.

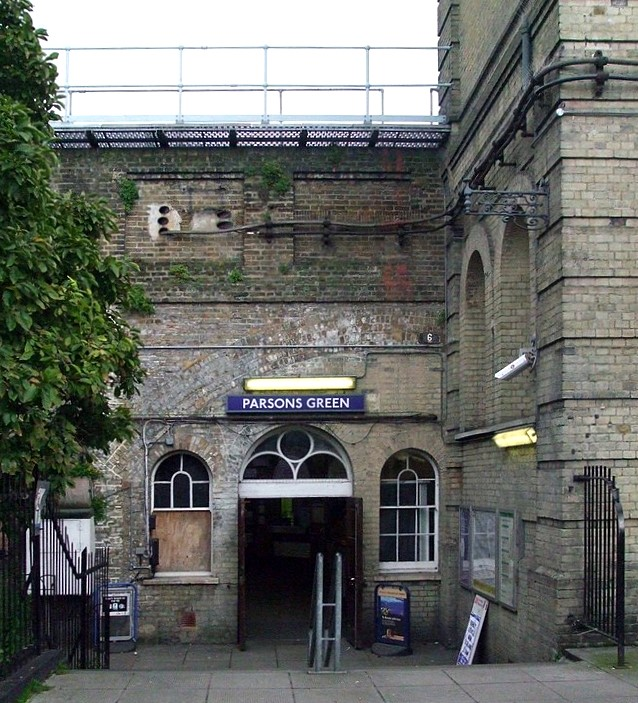
Parsons Green tube station

At the end of the 19th-century, the District Railway was extended towards the Thames and Wimbledon. In 1880 an eponymous railway station was opened a few hundred yards from the northernmost corner of the green. It was then possible for a number of years, to host Fulham F.C.'s home games there. Lady Margaret School, housed in several period buildings, is situated on its eastern side. An annual fundraiser called, 'Fair on the Green', is held on Parsons' green.

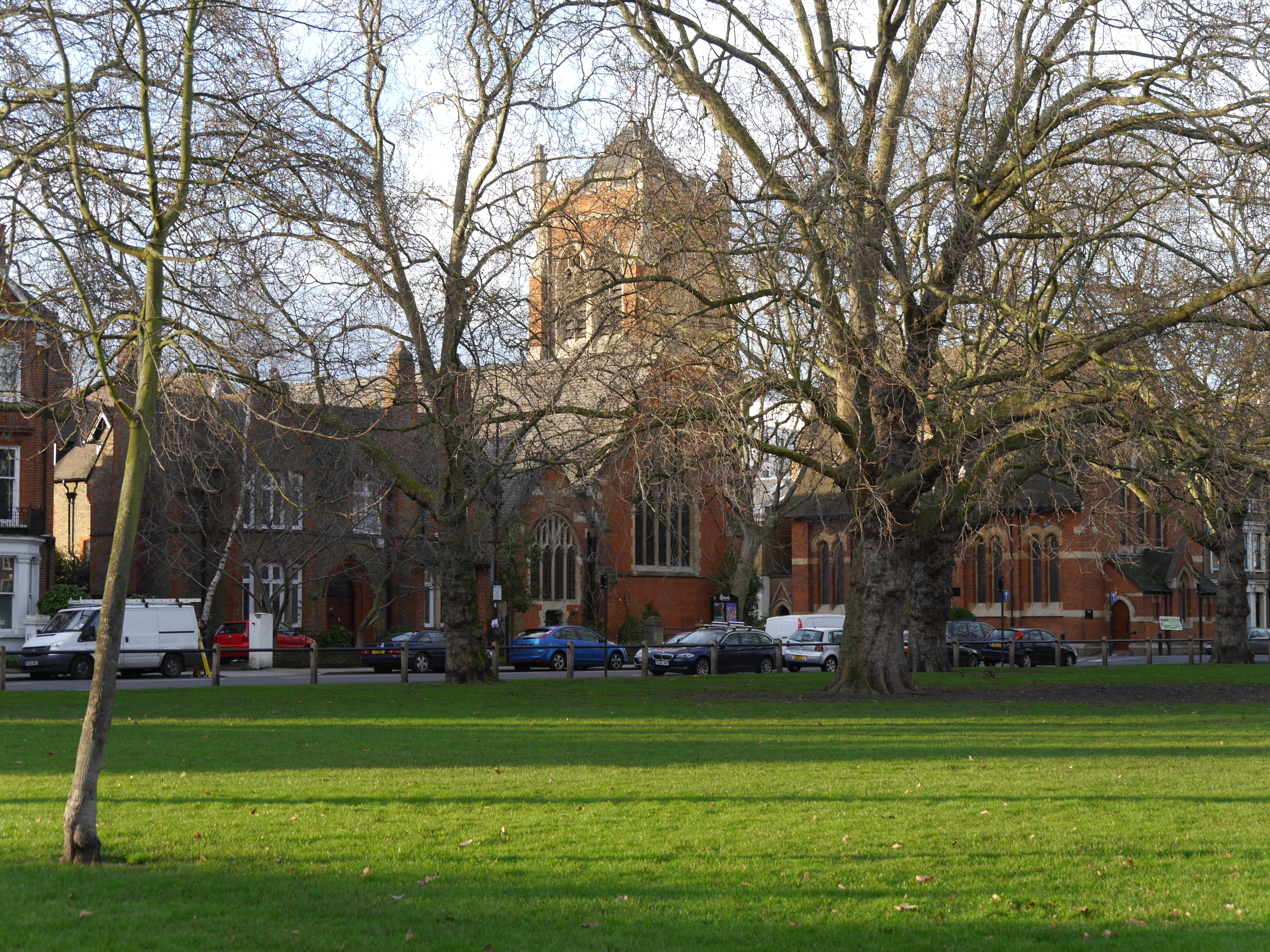
Trees on the Green with St. Dionis church
