= Diana Garnham =

British science administrator

Diana Garnham is a British science administrator. She was chief executive of the Science Council from 2006 to 2015.

Garnham was educated at Christ's Hospital, followed by Lady Margaret School, Parson's Green, London. She earned a degree in politics from University of Leicester, followed by a master's degree in war studies at King's College, London, then research in international politics at the Aberystwyth University, but she did not finish her PhD.

She was chief executive of the Association of Medical Research Charities (AMRC) from 1991 to 2005.

Garnham was chief executive of the Science Council from 2006 to 2015.

She was chair of the Department for Business Innovation and Skills' Expert Group on science for careers.
