= Irish Aid =

Irish international development aid programme

- Irish: Cúnamh Éireann

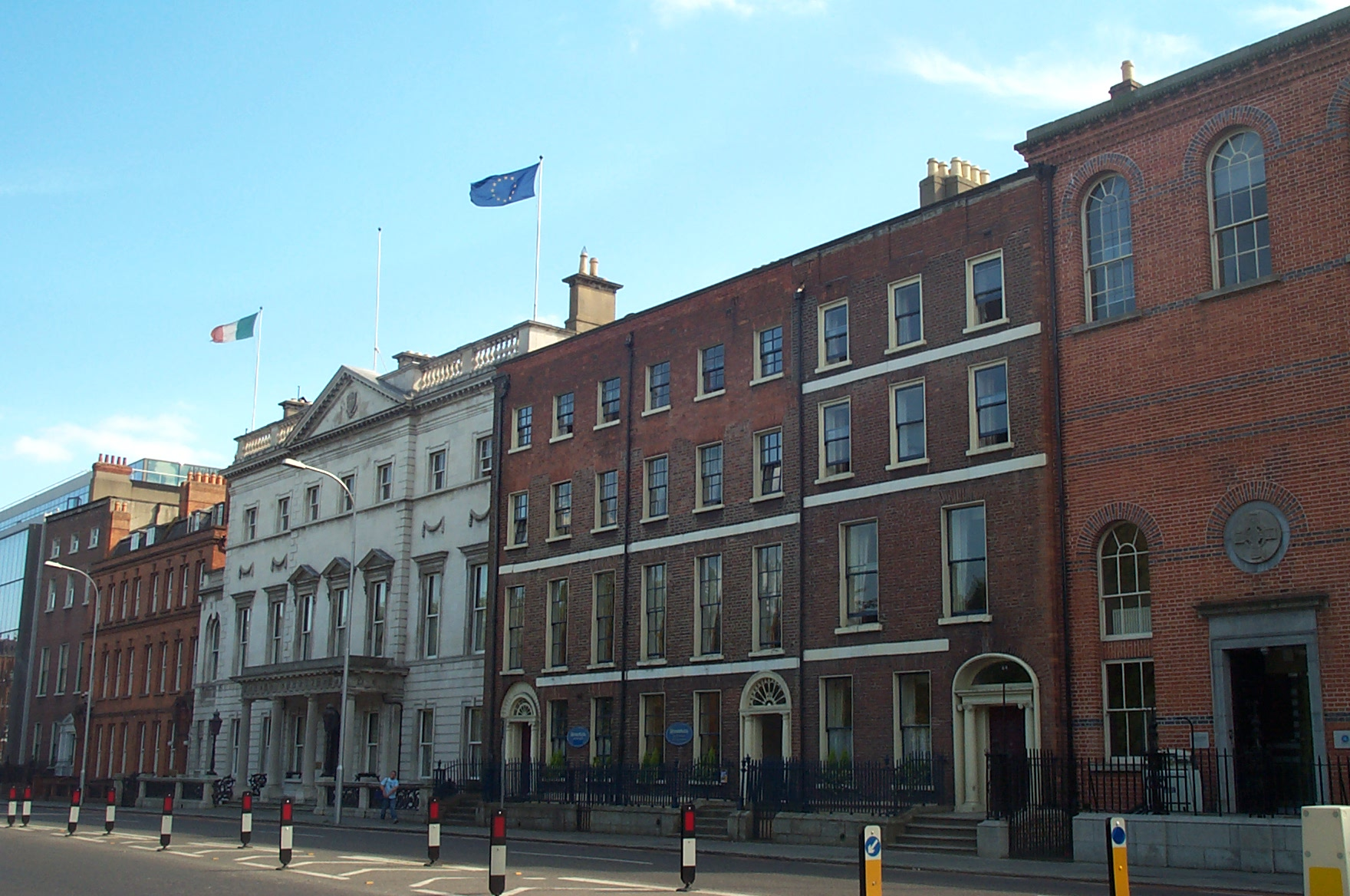
- Iveagh House in Dublin, DFA headquarters

Agency overview
- Formed: 1974
- Jurisdiction: Government of Ireland
- Headquarters: Iveagh House, 80 St Stephen's Green, Dublin 2 Riverstone House, 23-27 Henry Street, Limerick
- Employees: 184 Irish Aid staff 290 locally recruited staff Total: 474
- Annual budget: €870 million (2019 ODA)
- Agency executive: Ruairi De Burca, Director-General
- Parent agency: Department of Foreign Affairs
- Website: www.ireland.ie/en/irish-aid

Irish Aid (Irish: Cúnamh Éireann) is the Government of Ireland's official international development aid programme. Irish Aid is managed by the Development Co-Operation and Africa Division (DCAD) of the Department of Foreign Affairs (DFA). According to the OECD, Ireland's total ODA (US$2.5 billion, preliminary data) increased in 2022, mostly due to higher in-donor refugee costs and higher contributions to international organisations. ODA represented 0.64% of gross national income (GNI). The Irish Aid programme is an integral part of Ireland's foreign policy.

== Priority areas of work ==
Ireland works towards achieving the Sustainable Development Goals as set out by the United Nations. Accordingly, Irish Aid's priority areas are; Ending Poverty, Hunger, Gender Equality, Environment and Climate Change, Health, HIV/AIDS, Governance and Human Rights, Education, Trade and Economic Growth, Agriculture, Water and Sanitation.

Irish Aid also responds to humanitarian crisis around the world, including locations not in their area of operations, through humanitarian relief/assistance and supporting non-governmental organizations (NGOs) with multilateral aid. The Irish Aid Rapid Response Corps (RRC) is a team of highly skilled and experienced professionals available to deploy at short notice to humanitarian emergencies anywhere in the world, working with the UNHCR, WFP, OCHA and UNICEF to identify and fill specific skills gaps in emergencies.

Ireland sits on the OECD's 30-member Development Assistance Committee (DAC).

== Partner countries ==
The main focus of Irish Aid is on East, West and Southern Africa. Long-term development assistance has been established in nine "Key Partner Countries", these are:

- Ethiopia
- Kenya
- Malawi
- Mozambique
- Sierra Leone
- Tanzania
- Uganda
- Vietnam
- Zambia

Irish Aid also works in a number of other countries affected by conflict, including; Liberia, Palestine, South Africa, and Zimbabwe.

In 2014, more than 80 countries benefited from Irish bilateral aid.

Irish Aid operates its assistance programmes through the network of Ireland's overseas diplomatic missions.

== Organisational structure ==
- Director General
- Multilateral Unit
- Humanitarian Unit
- Civil Society & Development Education
- Planning & Performance Unit
- Bilateral Cooperation Unit West & East Africa
- Bilateral Cooperation Unit Southern Africa, Asia & Palestine
- Evaluation & Audit
- Policy Coherence & Research Unit

== Employees ==
The Irish Aid programme is managed by staff of the Department of Foreign Affairs. Recruitment is generally managed through the Public Appointments Services, with some positions advertised directly by the Department of Foreign Affairs on their website. Most positions are for permanent employment, and include general civil service, diplomat and development specialist positions. There are also temporary two-years contracts through the Junior Professional Internship (JPI) scheme. There are 145 permanent posts attached to Irish Aid's domestic headquarters in Dublin and Limerick. There are 39 permanent posts (excluding locally recruited staff) within Irish Aid missions in nine programme countries and a further 290 locally recruited overseas staff across all missions. This brings the agency's total number of employees to 474.

== Budget ==
Ireland allocated €870 million in official development assistance (ODA) in 2019. This represents 0.32% of gross national income (GNI).

Since the beginning of 2000 has been an overall expansion in the scale and scope of Ireland's development assistance programme which has seen the foreign aid budget rise from €255 million in 2000 to €870 million in 2019. The ODA GNP% peaked at 0.59% in 2008, later reducing to a consistent 0.32% since 2015.

According to the OECD, 2020 official development assistance from Ireland decreased 4.1% to US$972 million.

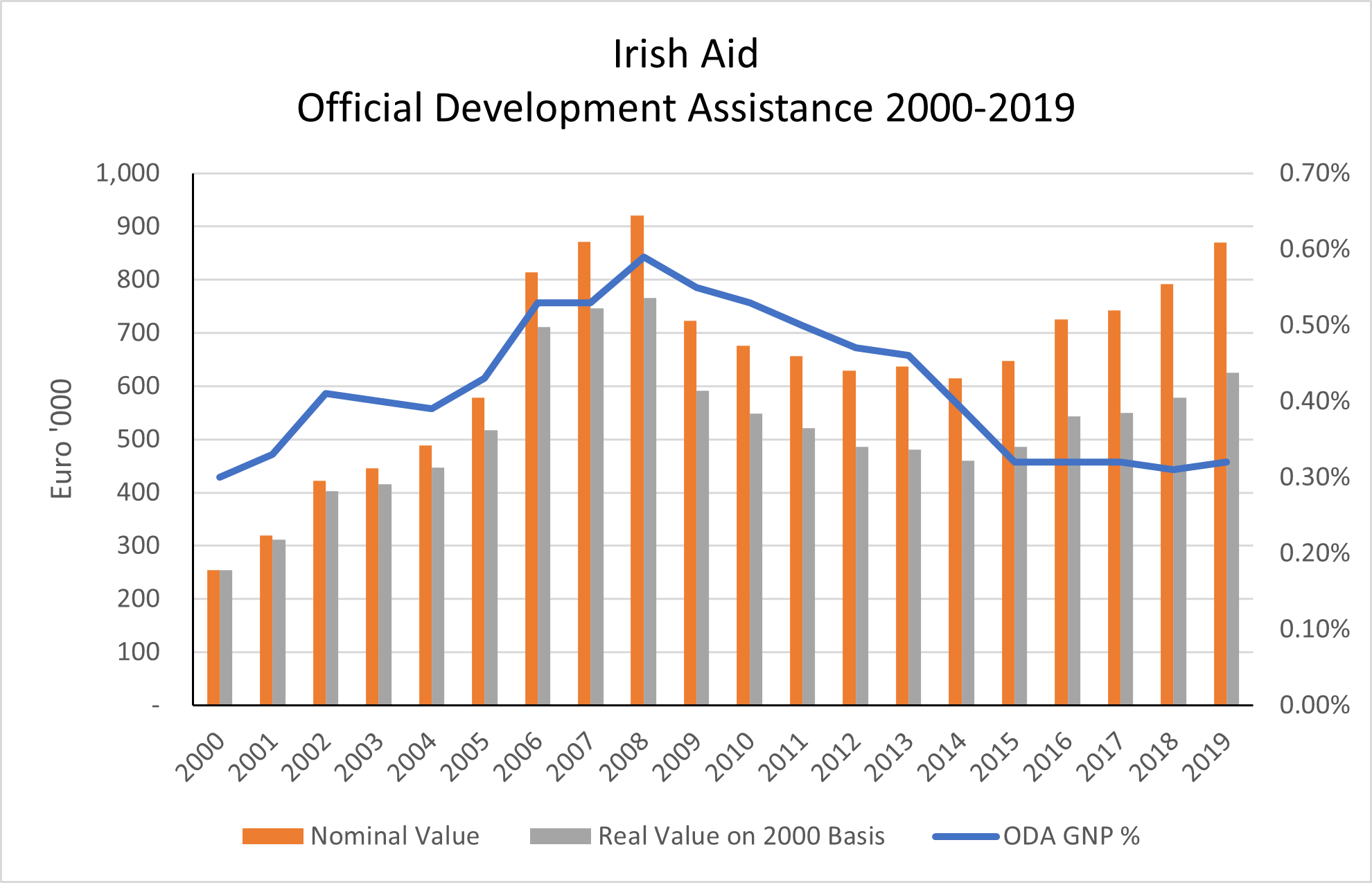

== Locations ==
Irish Aid's headquarters in Ireland are at the Department of Foreign Affairs, Iveagh House, 80 St Stephen's Green, Dublin 2 and Riverstone House, 23-27 Henry Street, Limerick. Irish Aid has permanent offices in Irish embassies in; Ethiopia, Malawi, Mozambique, Sierra Leone, Tanzania, Uganda, Vietnam and Zambia.

== See also ==
- Foreign relations of the Republic of Ireland
