= Aragon House =

Pub in Parsons Green, London

Coordinates: 51°28′21.5″N 0°12′2.5″W

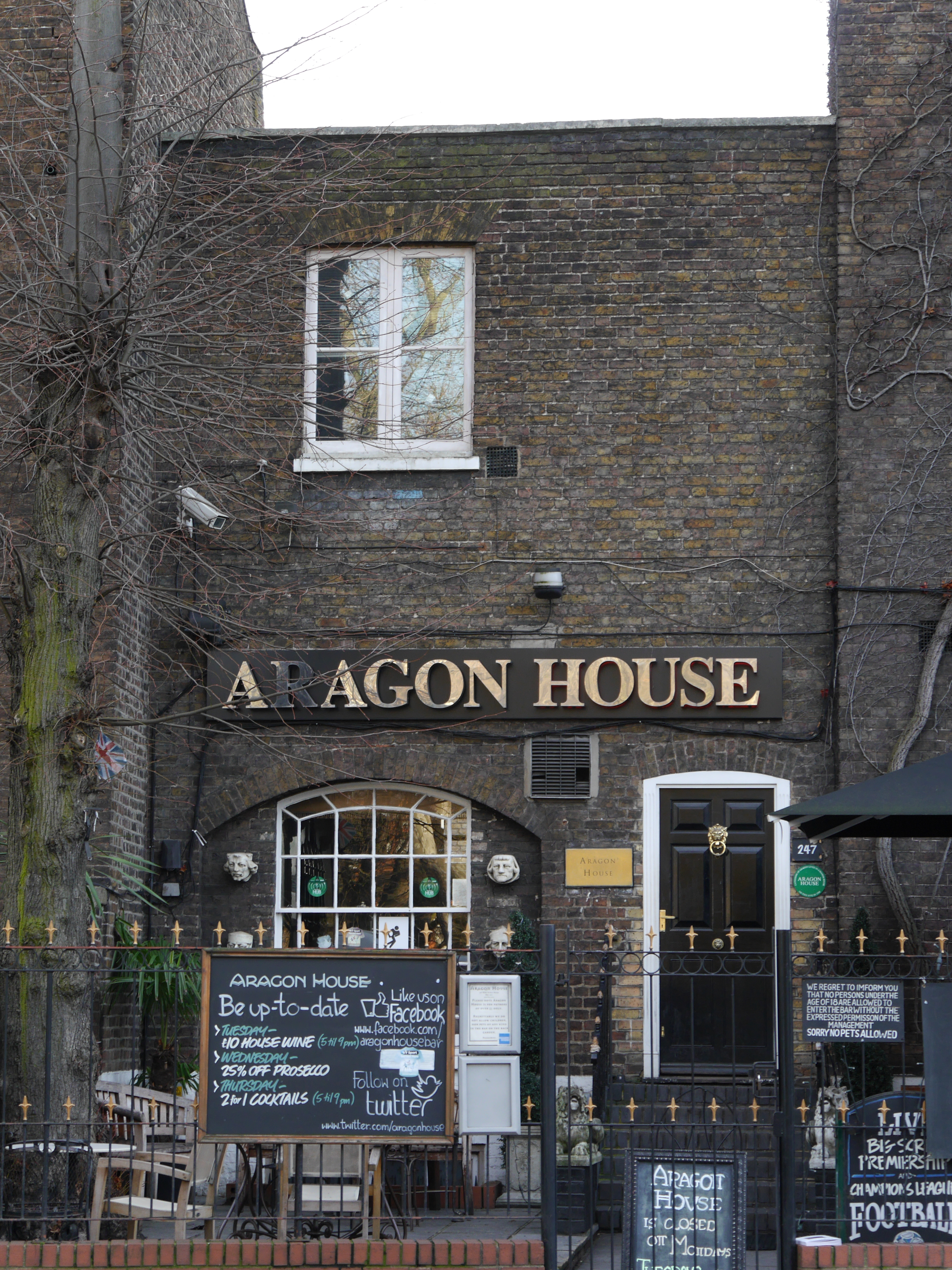
Aragon House, 2016

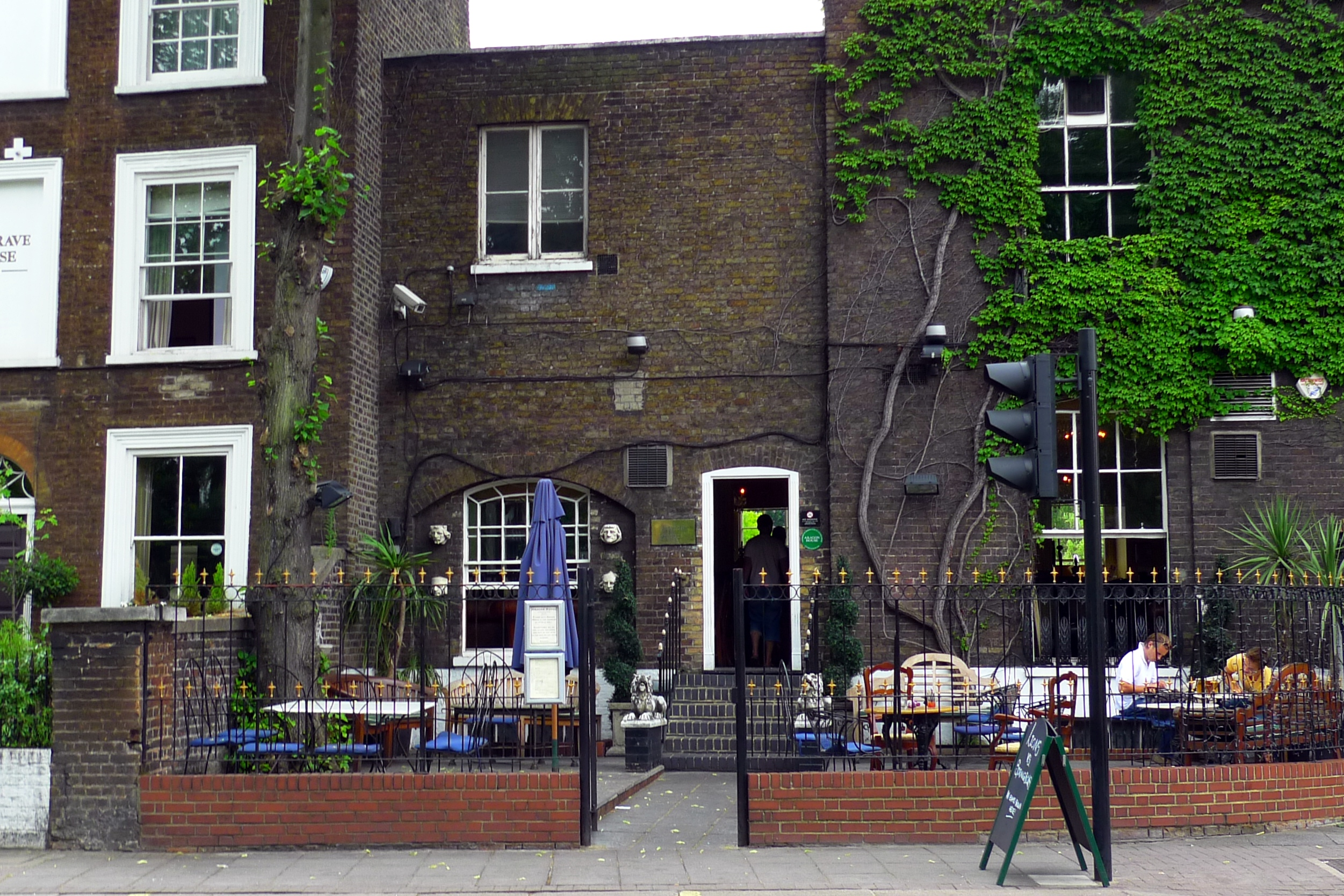
Aragon House, 2009

Aragon House is a Grade II listed public house at 249 New King's Road, Parsons Green, London.

It was built in 1805–06, but the architect is not known.

Aragon House gets its name from having been the site of a dower house belonging to Queen Catherine of Aragon, the first of Henry VIII's six wives.

Aragon House and Gosford Lodge were built on the site of a villa that the author Samuel Richardson lived in from 1756 until his death in 1761.
