= Lady Margaret School =

Secondary school in Parsons Green, London, England

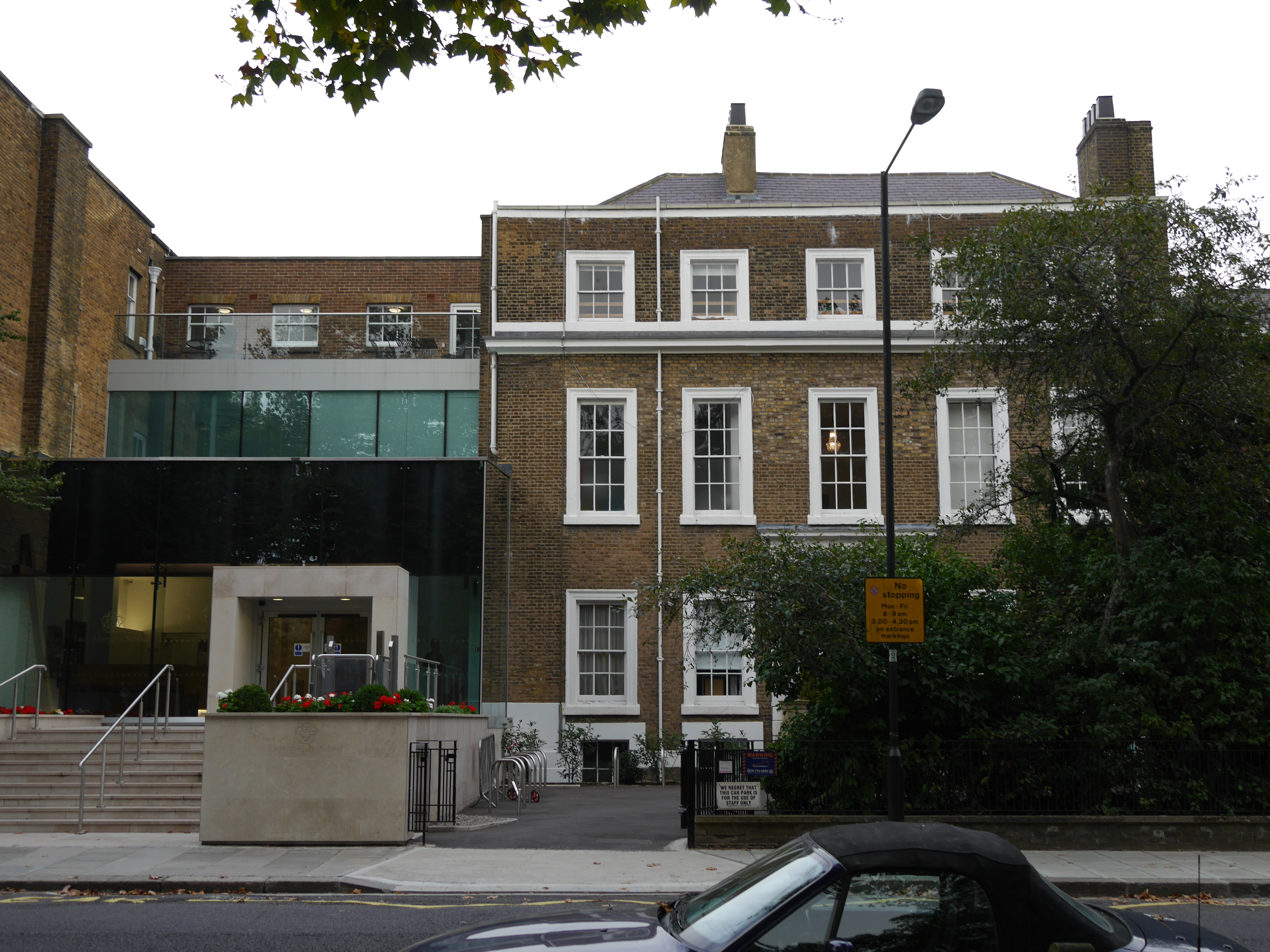
- Lady Margaret School, 2016

Location
- Parsons Green, London, SW6 4UN; England
- 51.474°N 0.199°W

Information
- Type: Academy; Comprehensive school
- Motto: I have a goodly heritage (Psalm 16.6)
- Religious affiliation: Church of England
- Established: September 1917; 108 years ago
- Founder: Enid Moberly Bell
- Department for Education URN: 138607 Tables
- Ofsted: Reports
- Chair: Philip Bladen
- Head teacher: Elisabeth Stevenson
- Gender: Girls
- Age: 11 to 18
- Enrolment: 742
- Sixth form students: 175
- Houses: Carver; Chirol; Kensington; Lyttleton; Marshall; Moberly-Bell
- Colours: Black and red strips
- Website: www.ladymargaret.lbhf.sch.uk

Lady Margaret School is an all-girls' Church of England comprehensive secondary school in Parsons Green, Fulham, London. It was awarded specialist school status (a government funding scheme defunct since 2010) as a Mathematics & Computing College in September 2003, and became an academy in September 2012. In September 2017 it celebrated its 100th anniversary. Princess Alexandra is patron of the centenary having previously opened the new assembly hall in 1965. Princess Alexandra attended a service to celebrate the centenary of Lady Margaret School at Westminster Abbey (the resting place of Lady Margaret Beaufort) on Tuesday 17 October 2017. The service was conducted by the Dean of Westminster, John Hall.

== Now ==
The school has approximately 742 girls aged between 11 and 18 years, about 175 of whom are in the sixth form. The majority of girls stay on into the sixth form. A number of students from other schools are given places in the sixth form following its expansion with the opening of the purpose-built Olivier Centre in 2010.

The headteacher is Elisabeth Stevenson, following the retirement of Sally Whyte in July 2015.

Today, Lady Margaret School is a Church of England academy in the London Borough of Hammersmith and Fulham. In 2003, the school achieved specialist status in mathematics and computing. In 2007, the school was described by Ofsted as 'good with outstanding features' and by the Statutory Inspection of Anglican Schools as 'outstanding'.

In 2010, the school opened a new building named 'The Olivier Centre', named after the former headmistress, Joan Olivier. The auditorium there was named after Colin Busby, a deputy head who also retired in 2006.

It was reviewed again in 2011, with Ofsted describing the school as 'outstanding'. Having been designated a 'high performing specialist school' following the successful Ofsted inspection, the school was awarded a second specialism in music.

In December 2012, the school was given the go-ahead by Hammersmith and Fulham Council to expand to permanently admit four forms of entry in Year Seven following the success of two earlier 'bulge' years. From September 2014, the school admitted four forms (120 pupils) in Year 7.

In December 2016, the Statutory Inspection of Anglican and Methodist Schools (SIAMS) conducted an inspection to evaluate the distinctiveness and effectiveness of the school as a church school. The report judged the school to be ‘Outstanding’ in all categories.

== History ==
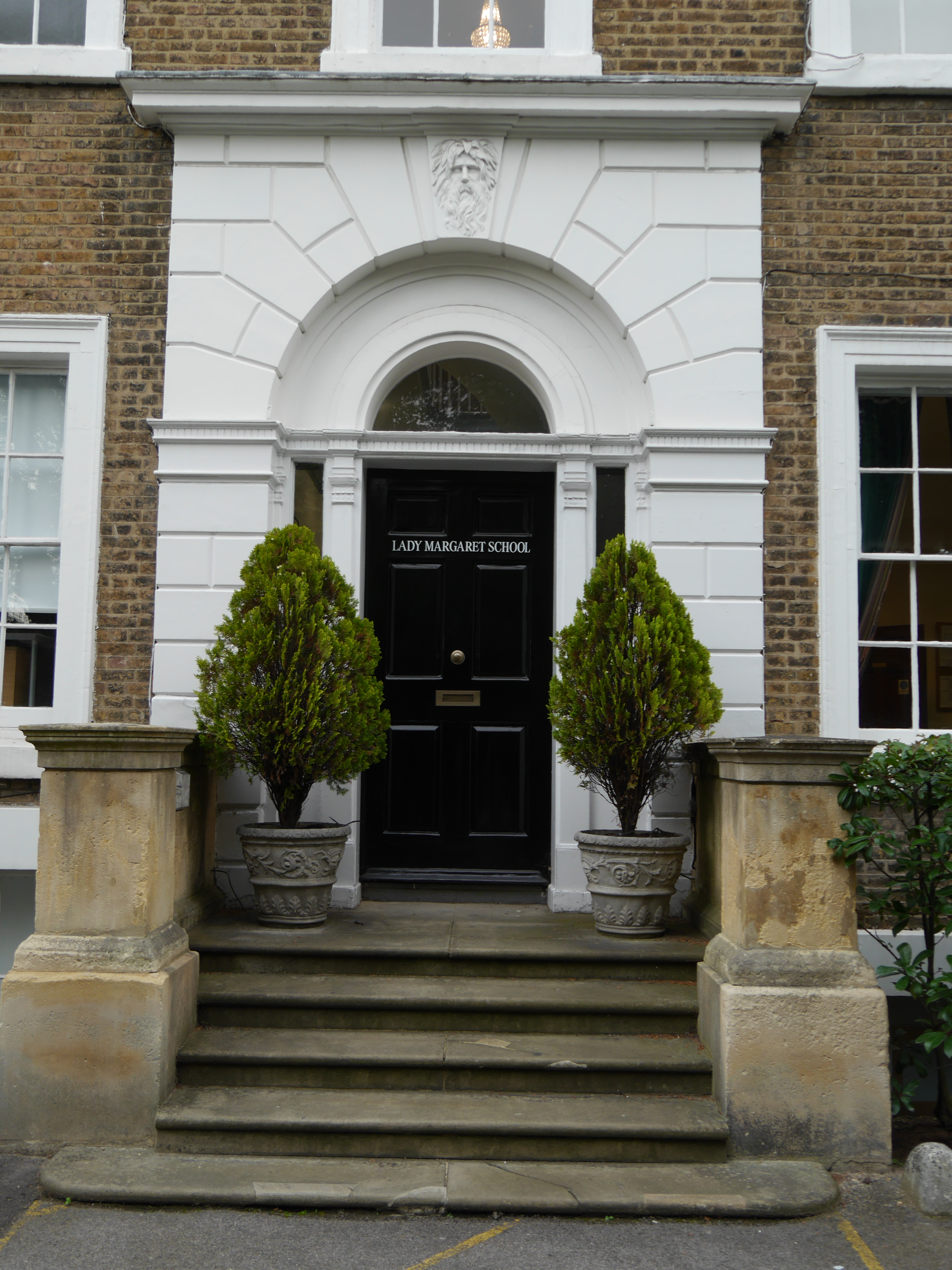
Lady Margaret School

Lady Margaret School has its origins in Whitelands College School, founded in 1842, a year after the creation of Whitelands College, one of the oldest higher education institutions in England. Whiteland College was founded by the Church of England's National Society as a teacher training college for women who undertook their training with the students at the adjacent Whitelands School. The college and school were adjacent to each other; the college being named after its first home, a Georgian building, Whitelands House, on King's Road in Chelsea, London. Whitelands School offered kindergarten classes for both boys and girls. Having completed kindergarten, most of the girls then attended the school's junior/primary classes.

In 1917, Whitelands School was threatened with closure, and it was only by the strenuous efforts of Enid Moberly Bell and her staff that a substantial number of the pupils were "rescued", forming Lady Margaret School that September. The 1963 Who's Who (UK) records that Moberley Bell had taught "advanced" subjects at "Whitelands College School". Records in The National Archives state that Moberly Bell was Lady Margaret School's founding headmistress. The school was named after the Lady Margaret Beaufort, mother of Henry VII, founder of St John's and Christ's Colleges, Cambridge, and a benefactress of education.

=== Belfield and Elm Houses ===
The school began life in the oldest of the three houses facing Parsons Green which now form the present school: Belfield House. In 1937, the second house, Elm House, with its bow windows overlooking a rear garden and long strip of playground, was purchased through the generosity of Anne Lupton (died 1967) and was renamed Lupton House. With the passing of the 1944 "Butler Act", the Kindergarten and Junior School were phased out and the school only enrolled girls at the secondary level.

The school was for many decades a fee-paying school. However, the 1944 "Butler Act" saw Lady Margaret become a two-form entry grammar school. In April 1951 its relationship to the Church of England was regularised when it became a voluntary aided school. It became a comprehensive school on its 60th anniversary in September 1977.

== Houses ==
There are six houses in the school: Moberly Bell and Marshall joined the four original houses in 2001/02.

Three of the six houses are named after women and the other three are after men. They are as follows:

- Moberly-Bell, (named after Enid Moberly-Bell, first headmistress of LMS) (pink),
- Lyttleton (after Edward Lyttelton, a benefactor of the school) (blue),
- Carver (named after an early benefactor of the school, Gertrude Carver, who was also a close family friend of Enid Moberly Bell) (green),
- Marshall (Florence Marshall, a previous headmistress)(purple),
- Chirol (Sir Valentine Chirol, a benefactor of the school) (red) and;
- Kensington (the Bishop of Kensington) (yellow).

== Notable former pupils ==
- Louise Alder – soprano
- Laura Barnett – author and journalist
- Mahalia Belo – film director
- Jessie Burton – actress and writer
- Martha Fiennes – film director
- Jill Saward, rape law reformist, aka the Ealing Vicarage Rape Victim
- Mia Soteriou, (Maria Soteriou) – actress and musician

=== Grammar school ===
- Nadine Baylis (1940-2017), stage and costume designer
- Betty Birch, England cricketer (1951-1958), pupil and PE teacher at the school
- Barbara Boxall, Editor from 1964–74 of Woman, and from 1962–64 of Woman's Realm
- Diana Garnham, Board member Construction Industry Training Board (CITB), Chief Executive 2006 – October 2015 of the Science Council, and from 1991–2005 of the Association of Medical Research Charities (AMRC)
- Kelly Hunter – actress
- Nigella Lawson (briefly) and her sister Horatia
- Janet Street-Porter — editor-at-large at the Independent newspapers
