= Eel Brook Common =

Common land in the London Borough of Hammersmith and Fulham

Coordinates: 51°28′37″N 0°11′43″W

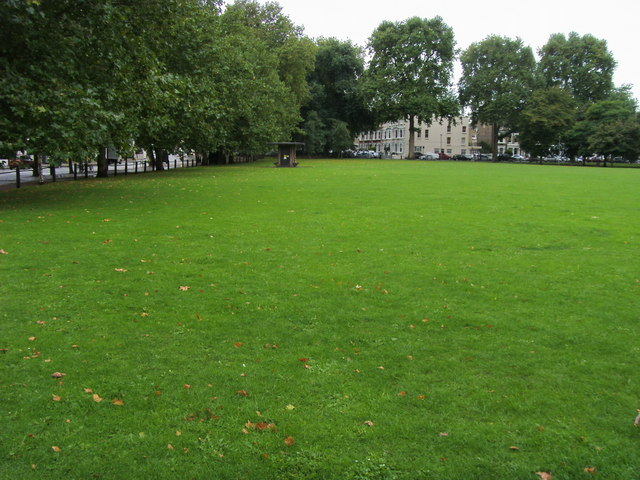
Eel Brook Common

Eel Brook Common is common land in the London Borough of Hammersmith and Fulham, close to Fulham Broadway, with its south-eastern boundary along New King's Road. According to the Fulham Society, the name actually is a derivative of 'hill brook common' - which relates to Musgrave Crescent, which is raised much higher than the surrounding land. It is believed that this is artificial and it probably was originally a Bronze Age mound - either a raised piece of ground to defend against attackers, or as a burial mound. When you leave Eel Brook Common from the north side, you go up a steep ramp - up onto Musgrave Crescent. It is within the Hammersmith and Fulham Conservation Area of Parsons Green.

== History ==
In 1883 and again in 1891 a then amateur local football team, Fulham F.C., played their home games there. The Common usually hosts a circus in early summer - and has three other fairs there every year - including Carters Steam Fair.

During World War II, an underground bunker was located under Eel Brook Common; this was to protect residents from the Luftwaffe - especially during the Blitz period - and explains why Eel Brook Common is unusually flat.

Illustrator Ralph Steadman lived opposite the Common while in London during the mid-20th century, as marked by a nearby blue plaque.

During 2002/2003 Groundwork West London completed a £300,000 make-over of the Common, installing surfaced and fenced sports pitches and revamping the vegetation there.

In the year 2008/2009, Chelsea Football Club help create an astroturf pitch which can be used in the community. It was sponsored by Chelsea in association with a sports wear firm and is in the blue of Chelsea Football Club. Many local residents complained to the Council about the colour in a green environment, and so there has been much work to grow varied natural screening.

The common can be accessed by many roads - including Effie Road to the north, Musgrave Crescent to the north-east and New King's Road to the south-east.

There are two tennis courts and a children's playground primarily aimed at under-6s.
