= Department of Foreign Affairs and Trade (Ireland) =

Irish government department

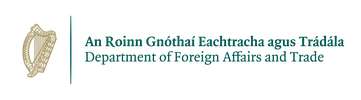

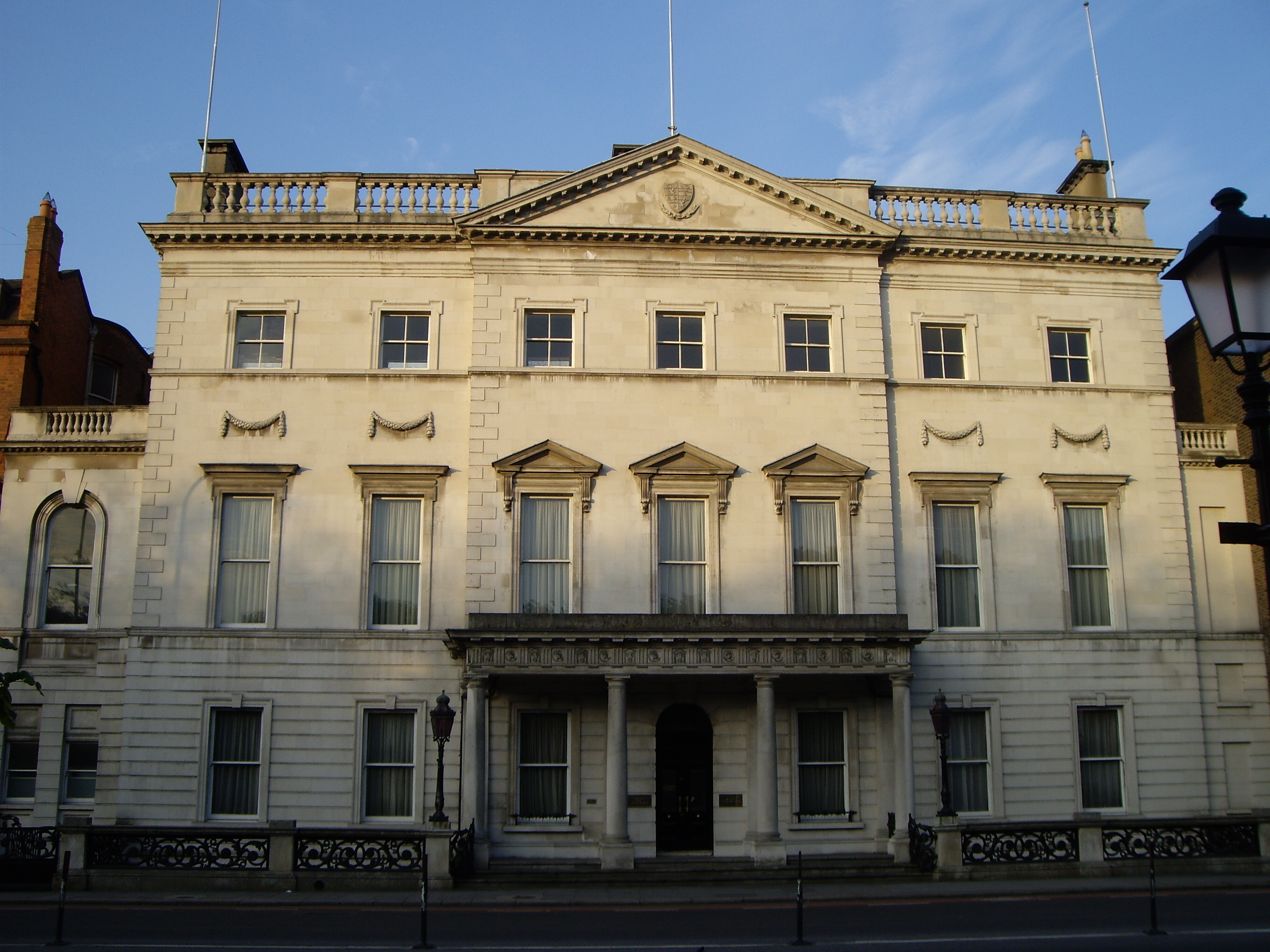
- Iveagh House, Dublin

Department overview
- Formed: 22 January 1919
- Jurisdiction: Government of Ireland
- Headquarters: Iveagh House, St Stephen's Green, Dublin; 53°20′12″N 6°15′34″W
- Annual budget: €1.108 billion (2022–2023)
- Minister responsible: Helen McEntee, Minister for Foreign Affairs and Trade
- Department executive: Joseph Hackett, Secretary General
- Child Department: Irish Aid
- Website: Official website

The Department of Foreign Affairs and Trade (DFAT) (Irish: An Roinn Gnóthaí Eachtracha agus Trádála) is a department of the Government of Ireland that is responsible for promoting the interests of Ireland in the European Union and the wider world. The head of the department is the Minister for Foreign Affairs and Trade.

== Departmental team ==
The official headquarters and ministerial offices of the department are in Iveagh House, St Stephen's Green, Dublin. The departmental team consists of the following:

- Minister for Foreign Affairs and Trade:Helen McEntee, TD
  - Minister of State for European Affairs: Thomas Byrne, TD
  - Minister of State for International Development and Diaspora: Neale Richmond, TD
- Secretary General of the Department: Joseph Hackett

== History ==
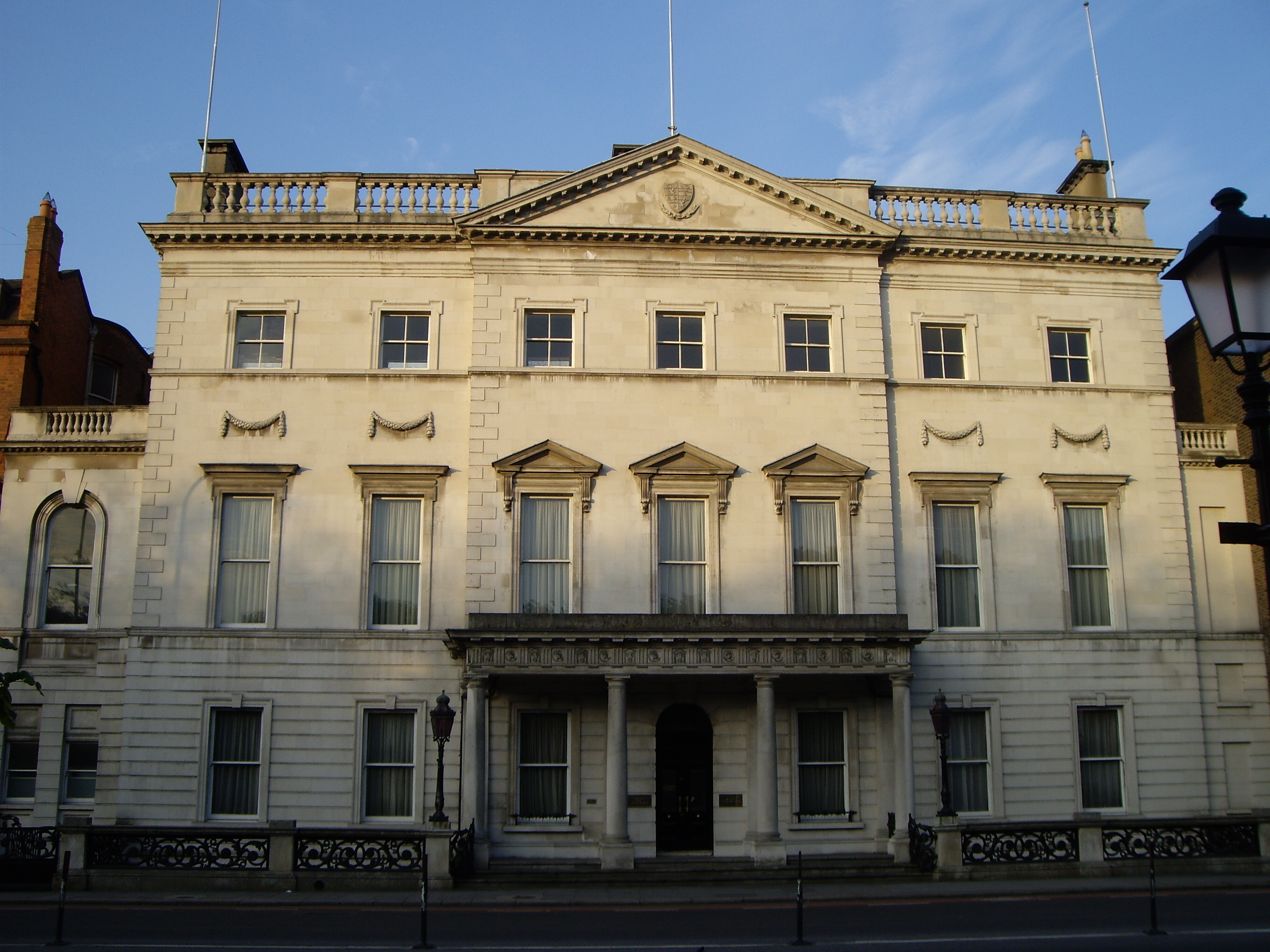
Iveagh House, Department headquarters

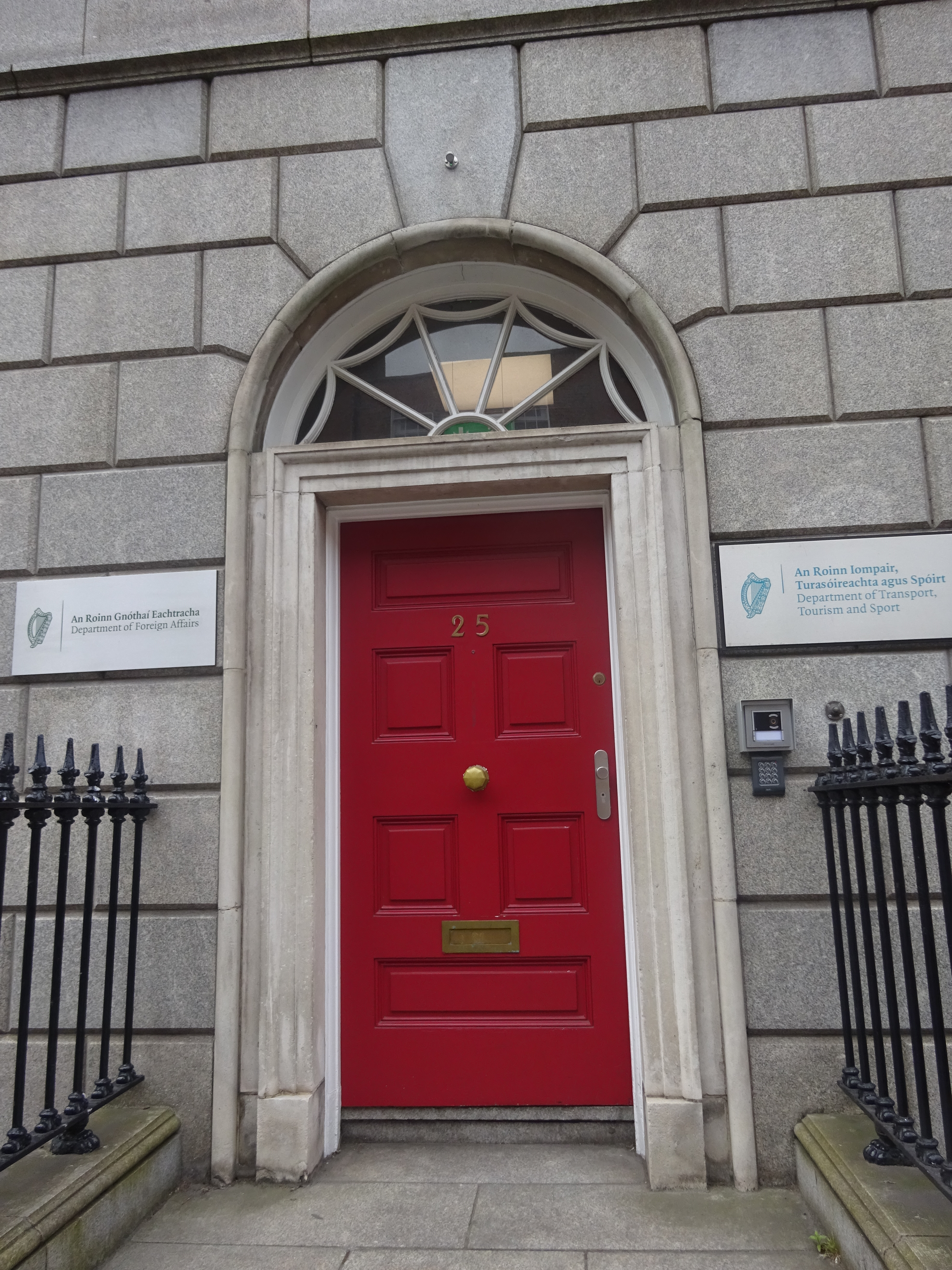
Department of Foreign Affairs and Trade offices on 25 Clare Street, Dublin.

The Department of Foreign Affairs was created on 22 January 1919, the second day of meeting of Dáil Éireann. By August 1921 there were eight 'official' missions abroad: France, Italy, USA, United Kingdom, Germany, Russia, Argentina and Chile. No other Commonwealth country (other than the UK) had independent representation in Washington.

=== Alteration of name and transfer of functions ===
Date	Effect
2 June 1924	Establishment of the Department of External Affairs
3 March 1971	Renamed as the Department of Foreign Affairs
1 June 2011	Transfer of Trade from the Department of Enterprise, Trade and Innovation
2 June 2011	Renamed as the Department of Foreign Affairs and Trade
23 September 2020	Transfer of Trade to the Department of Business, Enterprise and Innovation
24 September 2020	Renamed as the Department of Foreign Affairs
26 March 2025	Renamed as the Department of Foreign Affairs and Trade

== Overview ==
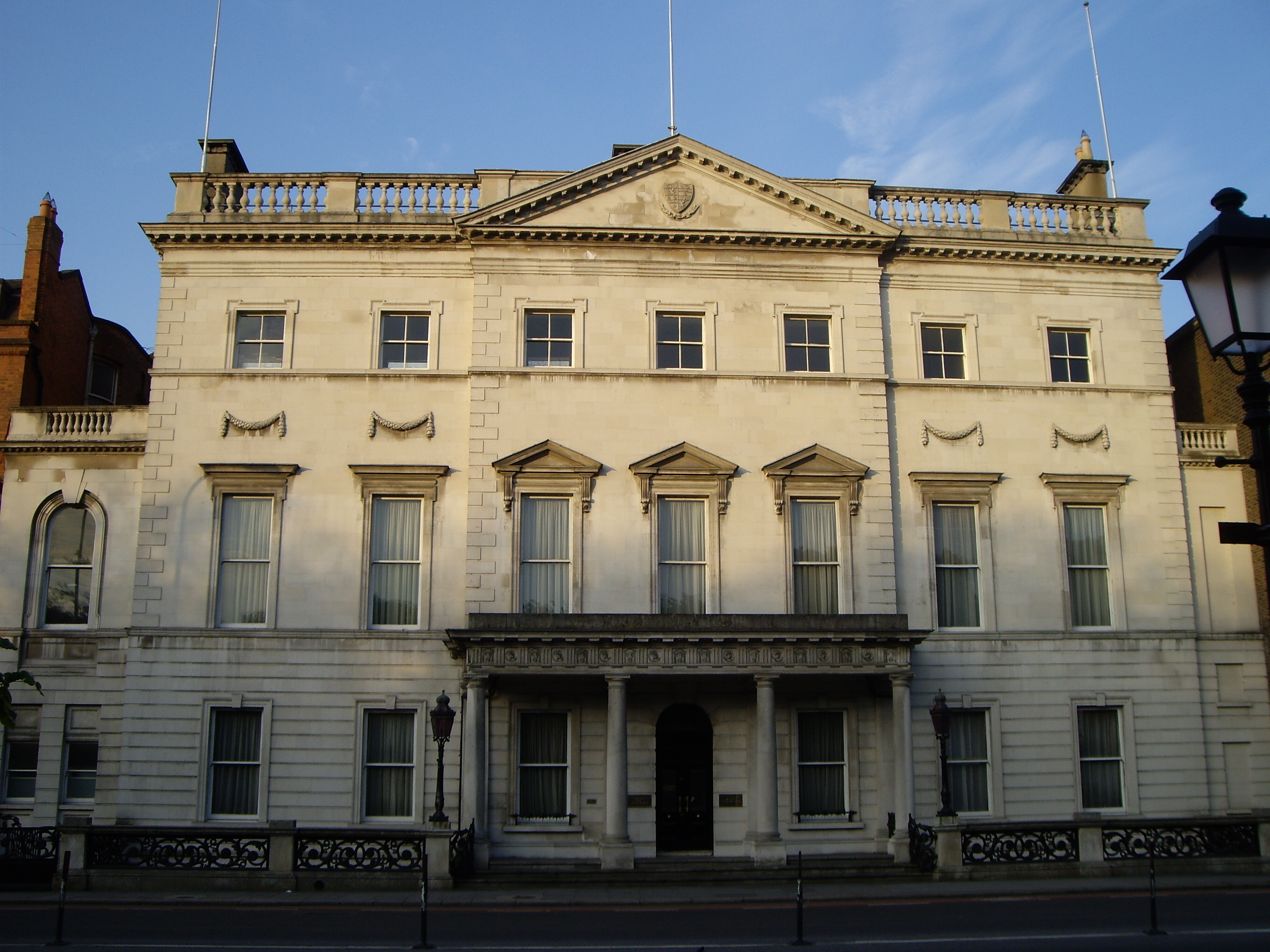
Iveagh House, Department of Foreign Affairs and Trade, Ireland

The department has the following divisions:

- Finance Unit – oversees the financial control of the department.
- Anglo-Irish Division – deals with Anglo-Irish relations and Northern Ireland.
- Cultural Division – administers the state's Cultural Relations Programme.
- European Union Division – coordinates the state's approach within the European Union (EU).
- Development Cooperation Division – responsible for the Irish Aid programme and for Irish international development policy.
- Passport and Consular Division – is responsible for the issuing of passports to Irish citizens.
- Political Division – is responsible for international political issues and manages the state's participation in the EU's Common Foreign and Security Policy.
- Protocol Division – is responsible for the organisation and management of visits of VIPs to the state and of visits abroad by the President of Ireland.

The minister has responsibility for the relations between Ireland and foreign states. The department defines its role as: "The Department of Foreign Affairs advises the Minister for Foreign Affairs, the Ministers of State and the Government on all aspects of foreign policy and coordinates Ireland's response to international developments.

It also provides advice and support on all issues relevant to the pursuit of peace, partnership and reconciliation in Northern Ireland, and between North and South of the island, and to deepening Ireland's relationship with Britain."

There are no organisations or agencies under the aegis of the Department.

== Structure ==
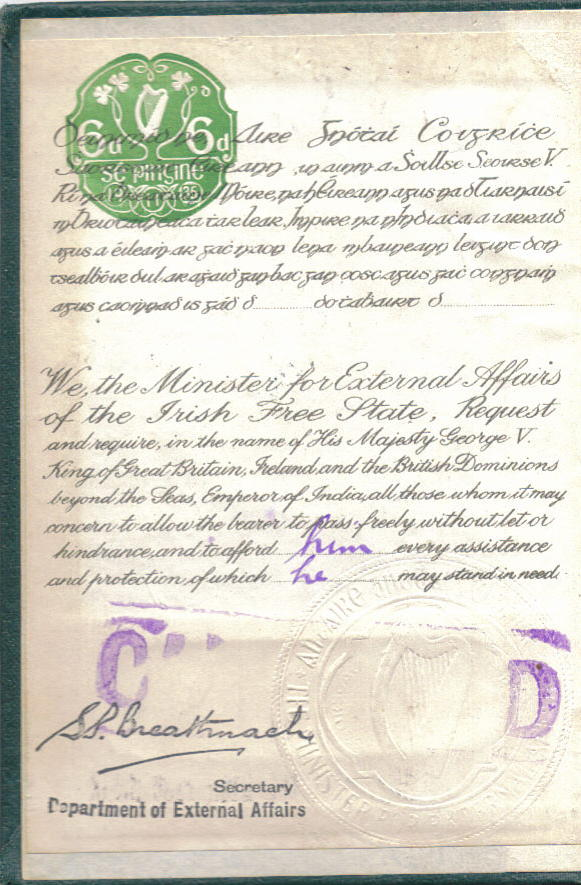
Request page of Irish Free State passport issued 1936. We, the Minister for External Affairs of the Irish Free State, Request and require, in the name of His Majesty George V. King of Great Britain, Ireland and the British Dominions beyond the Seas, Emperor of India, all those whom it may concern to allow the bearer to pass freely...etc.

The mission of the Department of Foreign Affairs is to advance Ireland's political and economic interests in the European Union and in the wider world, to promote Ireland's contribution to international peace, security and development, both through the European Union and through active participation in international organisations such as the United Nations. The department is divided into divisions and units:

- Anglo-Irish Division deals with Anglo-Irish relations and Northern Ireland.
- Bilateral Economic Relations Division deals with Ireland's bilateral economic relations with countries throughout the world.
- Corporate Services Division is responsible for the day-to-day management of the department.
- Cultural Division administers Ireland's Cultural Relations Programme.
- Development Co-operation Directorate is responsible for the administration of the Irish Aid programme and for the conduct of Irish development policy.
- European Union Division coordinates Ireland's approach within the European Union.
- Inspection Unit evaluates the performance of the department's overseas missions and audits Headquarters divisions and offices.
- Irish Abroad Unit deals with promoting services that assist emigrants and administers the financial support that the department directs to groups in the voluntary sector that are engaged in the delivery of services to Irish emigrants.
- Legal Division provides the department with legal advice and has responsibilities in the negotiation of international agreements.
- Consular and Passport Division is responsible for the administration of consular services and the issuing of passports to Irish citizens.
- Political Division is responsible for international political issues and manages Ireland's participation in the EU's Common Foreign and Security Policy.
- Press Section is responsible for informing the domestic and international media about developments in Irish foreign policy.
- Protocol Division is responsible for the organisation and management of visits of VIPs to Ireland and of visits abroad by the President, as well as the administration of Ireland's obligations under the Vienna Convention.

In 2016, the Department of Foreign Affairs had 1,470 employees, 320 of which were posted overseas.

=== Irish Abroad Unit ===
The Irish Abroad Unit is a unit coordinates the provision of services to Irish emigrants across the globe and administers financial support to organizations in the voluntary sector engaged in the delivery of services to Irish emigrants. It is part of the Citizen Services Division. It was established in 2004 following an announcement by the Minister of Foreign Affairs, Brian Cowen.

Grants are extended to groups in the voluntary sector who provide advice and support to Irish people abroad, particularly those that help migrants access their rights and entitlements in their host countries. Priority is given to organizations that support the most vulnerable and marginalized, such as the older Irish community in Great Britain and undocumented Irish in the United States. Smaller grants have also been allocated to Irish groups in Australia, Canada, Argentina, South Africa, Zimbabwe, New Zealand, Singapore, France and Mexico as well as to organizations in Ireland who provide pre-departure information and also advice to those emigrants who may be considering returning to Ireland. In 2007, the Irish Abroad Unit awarded grants of €14.165 million to organizations in eleven countries.

Following increases in funding, the program has expanded to include capital projects, as well as culture and heritage projects that support community networks and build on the interest of citizens abroad in their Irish heritage.

In general, recipients of emigrant services funding are Irish community organizations who have a functioning board of management, show clear objectives and have an accounting framework in place. The payment of grants to individual Irish citizens resident abroad is beyond the remit of the Irish Abroad Unit.

== See also ==
- Foreign relations of the Republic of Ireland
- Irish passport
- List of diplomatic missions of Ireland
