= Woman's Realm =

British women weekly magazine

Woman's Realm was a British weekly women's magazine first published in 1958. One of the editors-in-chief was Joyce Wards. In 2001 it was merged with Woman's Weekly.

The Belle & Sebastian song "Women's Realm" makes reference to this magazine (with the singular "woman" appearing in the lyrics).
