= Iveagh House =

Georgian house and foreign ministry headquarters in Dublin, Ireland

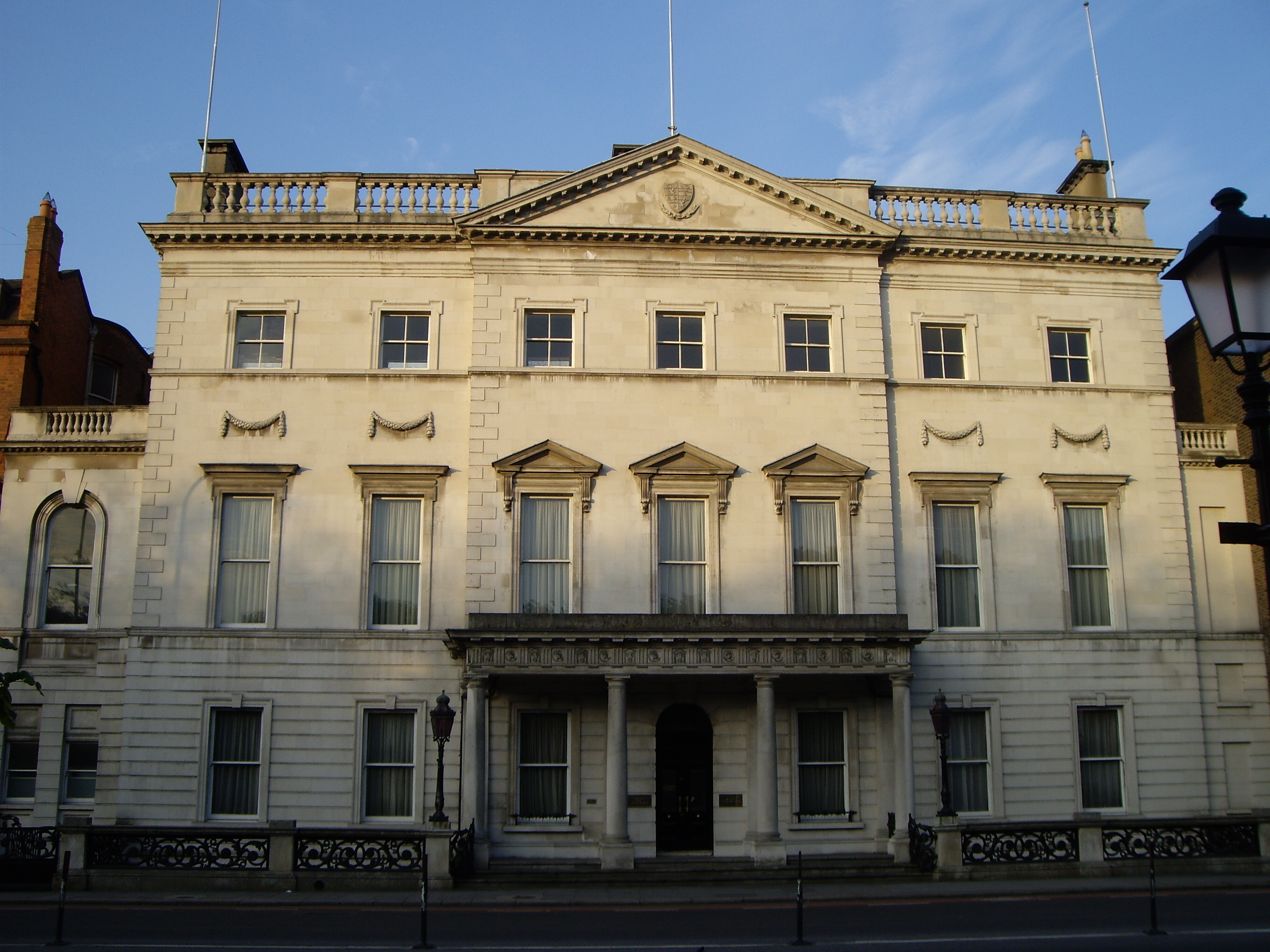
- Main façade of Iveagh House
- Interactive map of the Iveagh House area

General information
- Architectural style: Neoclassical
- Location: St Stephen's Green, Dublin, Ireland
- Coordinates: 53.336538°N 6.259376°W
- Current tenants: Department of Foreign Affairs and Trade
- Completed: 1736
- Inaugurated: 1939
- Renovated: 1862
- Owner: Government of Ireland

Design and construction
- Architect: Richard Castle

Renovating team
- Architect: Benjamin Guinness

Iveagh House is a Georgian house which now contains the headquarters of the Department of Foreign Affairs and Trade in Dublin, Ireland. It is also sometimes used colloquially as a metonym referring to the department itself.

== History ==
Iveagh House was originally two houses, nos 80 and 81 St Stephen's Green. No 80 was designed by Richard Castle in 1736 for Bishop Clayton. It was later the home of barrister and Master of the Rolls John Philpot Curran.

After both houses were bought by Benjamin Guinness in 1862 he served as his own architect, combined the two houses and produced the building as it now stands. On the Portland stone facade pediment he placed his parents' arms: on the left the Milesian lion, with the Red Hand of Ulster above, for the Magennis clan of County Down; and on the right the arms of the Lee family, Dublin builders from about 1700. The building has nine bays, with the central three broken forward and pedimented. The interior of the building is hugely elaborate and decorative, with a staircase and ballroom lined with alabaster. The staircase also has ornate ironwork, marble columns and circular roof lights.

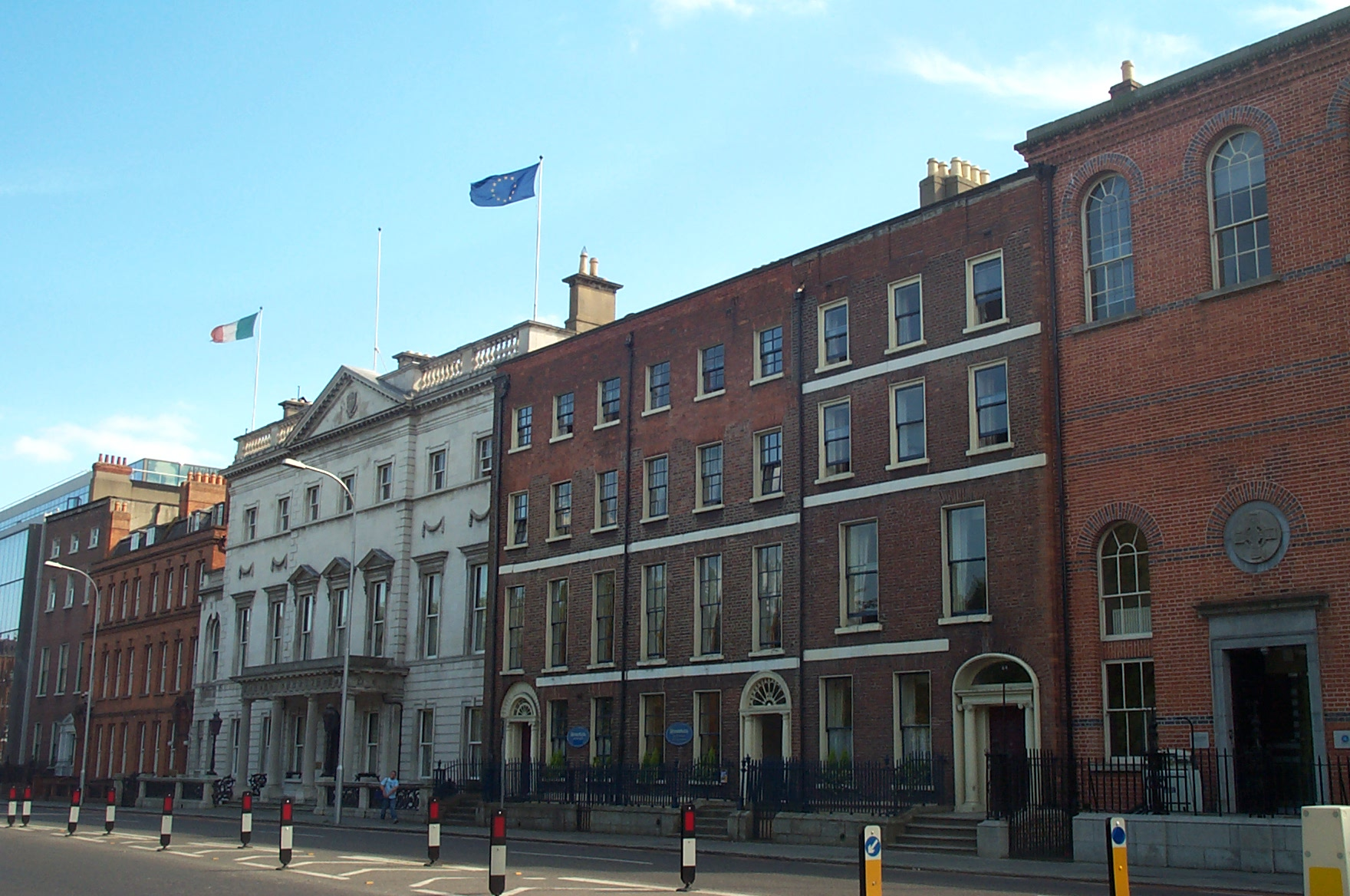
St. Stephen's Green South, looking east towards Iveagh House.

The building was donated to the Irish state by Benjamin Guinness's grandson, Rupert, Lord Iveagh, in 1939, and was renamed Iveagh House. The original Iveagh House is still a part of the Iveagh Trust nearby.

The Iveagh Gardens at the back of the house were given to University College Dublin (UCD), by The 1st Lord Iveagh in 1908, in connection with the formation of its campus on Earlsfort Terrace. The gardens have since been transferred to the OPW and are now used as a public park. The conservation and restoration of the Gardens commenced in 1995 and to date most of the original features have been restored, for example the Maze in Box hedging with a Sundial as a centre piece. The restored Cascade and exotic tree ferns all help to create a sense of wonder in the 'Secret Garden'.
