= Parsons Green =

Coordinates: 51.4738°N 0.1991°W

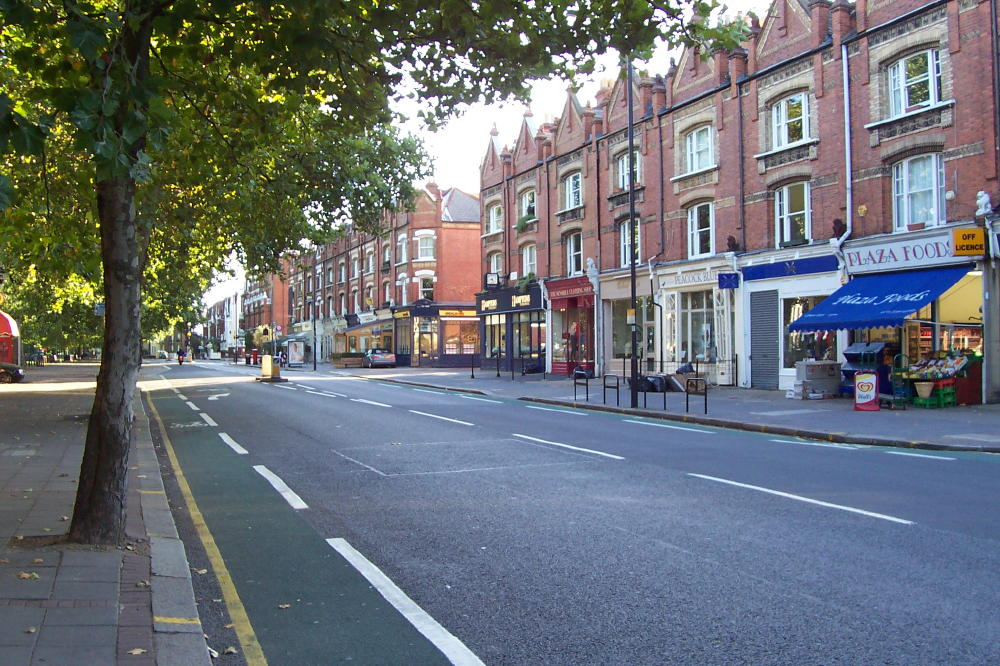
- New Kings Road, Parsons Green

- Location within Greater London
- Population: 10,813 (2011 Census. Parsons Green and Walham Ward)
- OS grid reference: TQ251765
- London borough: Hammersmith & Fulham
- Ceremonial county: Greater London
- Region: London
- Country: England
- Sovereign state: United Kingdom
- Post town: LONDON
- Postcode district: SW6
- Dialling code: 020
- Police: Metropolitan
- Fire: London
- Ambulance: London
- UK Parliament: Chelsea and Fulham
- London Assembly: West Central

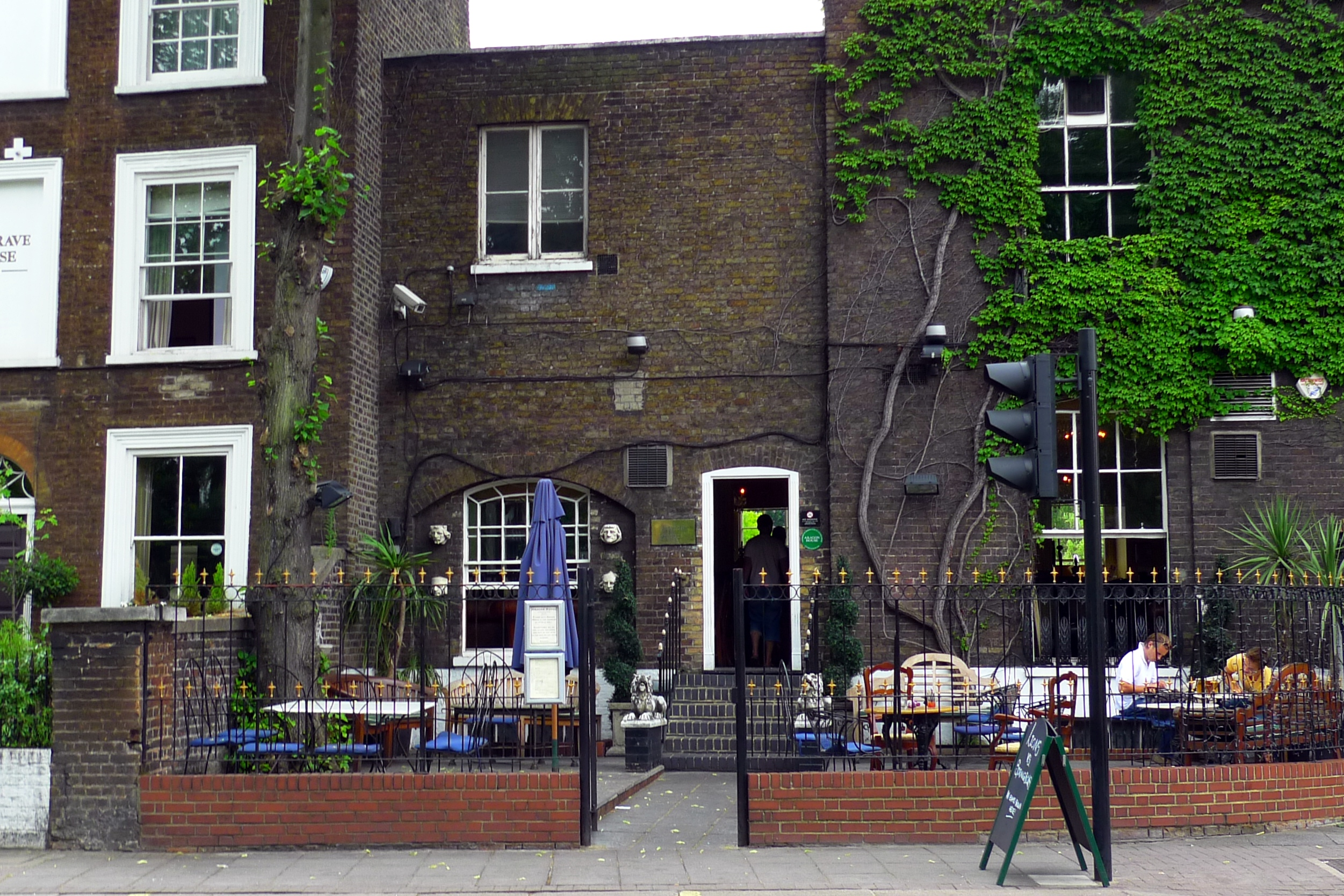
Aragon House, Parsons Green, London

Parsons Green is a mainly residential district in the London Borough of Hammersmith and Fulham. The Green itself, which is roughly triangular, is bounded on two of its three sides by the New King's Road section of the King's Road, A308 road and Parsons Green Lane. The wider neighbourhood is bounded by the Harwood and Wandsworth Bridge Roads, A217 road to the east and Munster Road to the west, while the Fulham Road, A3219 road may be said to define its northern boundary. Its southern boundary is less clearly defined as it merges quickly and imperceptibly with the Sulivan Court Estate and Hurlingham.

At its historic centre lie two open spaces, the Green itself and Eel Brook Common. The name stems from the original village green, after the former residence of the rectors of Fulham Parish. It is one of the Conservation areas in Hammersmith and Fulham, that extends from the borough boundary in the east to Fulham High Street in the west.

== History ==
Timber rights attached to the Green are mentioned in court rolls dating from 1391. In 1625 there were only six rated residents for the area. By 1706, John Bowack opined in his Antiquities of Middlesex that it "was inhabited mostly by gentry and persons of quality".

Two cricket matches were held on Parsons Green in 1731 and 1733, both between sides from Fulham and Chelsea.

In the 18th century, changes continued with the building of grand houses with grounds. These were bought by merchants and bankers from the City and not infrequently by members of the Court and their 'associations'. The area acquired a somewhat louche reputation at that time.

Fulham F.C. had their ground in the park for two years from 1889. Early in the 20th century, a few test flights were carried out there with flying machines.

Parsons Green is referred to in an early poem by Sir John Betjeman, The Varsity Students Rag, as a place where the poem's protagonist is said to have a "run-in" with a policeman.

On 15 September 2017, an explosion occurred on a London Underground train at Parsons Green, injuring 29 people. The improvised explosive device was placed in a bucket but did not fully detonate, with injuries being largely burn related. No fatalities were reported. An 18-year-old Iraqi refugee was arrested the next day at the Port of Dover. He was subsequently sentenced to life imprisonment with a minimum jail term of 34 years, having found to have been in contact with members of Islamic State.

== Demographics ==
In 2018, the ward of Parsons Green & Walham had a population of 11,041 people. Parsons Green & Walham has the highest income of any ward in Hammersmith and Fulham, with an average gross household income of £63,700. The ward is 56.8 per cent White British and 25.4 per cent Other White, mainly consisting of EU citizens, Australasians and North Americans.

== Houses of note ==
- Holly Bush House – later 'East End', tenancy of Maria Fitzherbert, demolished 1884
- Belfield House – home of Mrs Jordan, later part of Lady Margaret School
- Elm House – also became part of Lady Margaret School
- Henniker – later Park House, designed by Thomas Cubitt, demolished 1889
- Aragon House
- Gosford Lodge
- Pitts Place terrace, including Albyn, Belgrave, Cradley, Rosslyn and Sefton

== Notable residents of the Green ==
- Sir William Butts (c.1486–1545) – physician to Henry VIII
- John Mordaunt, 1st Earl of Peterborough at Peterborough House
- Charles Mordaunt, 3rd Earl of Peterborough at Peterborough House
- Sir John Powell (1645–1713) Baron of the Exchequer
- Admiral Sir Charles Wager (1666–1743)
- Samuel Richardson (1689–1761) – moved here from North End, Fulham
- T. Crofton Croker (1798–1854) – Irish antiquary and writer on Fulham
- Carol Lambrino (1920–2006) – First son of King Carol II of Romania
- Charles Kay (1930-2025) - Actor lived in Parson's Green for many years.
- Paul Merton (born 1957), Comedian and actor, born in Parsons Green.
- Toni Halliday (1964-) Musician and member of rock band Curve, born in Parsons Green.

== Transport ==
Bus route 22 includes New King's Road and the area is also served by Parsons Green tube station on the District line.

== Politics ==
Parsons Green is part of the Parsons Green and Sandford ward for elections to Hammersmith and Fulham London Borough Council.
