= Cremin (surname) =

Cremin is a surname. Notable people with the surname include:

- Aedeen Cremin (born 1940), Irish and Australian archaeologist
- Con Cremin (1908–1987), Irish diplomat
- David Cremin (1930–2025), Irish-born Australian Roman Catholic bishop
- Deanna Cremin (1978–1995), American murder victim
- Eric Cremin (1914–1973), Australian golfer
- Francis Cremin (1910–2001), Irish theologian
- Gus Cremin (1921–2014), Irish Gaelic footballer
- Hilary Cremin, British academic
- Kieran Cremin, Irish Gaelic footballer
- Lawrence A. Cremin (1925–1990), American educational historian and administrator
- Mick Cremin (1923–2011), Australian rugby union player
- Patrick Cremin, British actor
- Robert W. Cremin, American business executive
