= Quarantine (disambiguation) =

Quarantine is a medical term for the act of keeping an object in enforced isolation for a period of time to limit or prevent the spread of disease or infection.

Quarantine may also refer to:

== Medicine and disease ==
- Cordon sanitaire, isolation of a geographic region to prevent transmission of disease beyond the region
- Isolation (health care), isolation of infected to prevent transmission of disease
- Biocontainment, isolation of medical samples of infected tissues and disease agents

== Government and law ==
- An alternative term for a naval blockade, particularly associated with the United States' "quarantine" of Cuba during the Cuban Missile Crisis of late 1962
- A grace period of 40 days during which a widow has the right to remain in her dead husband's home, regardless of the inheritance
- Quarantine Speech, a 1937 speech by U.S. President Franklin Delano Roosevelt
- COVID-19 community quarantines in the Philippines, a set of community quarantines during the COVID-19 pandemic in the Philippines

== Films ==
- Quarantined (film), a 1970 US television film
- Quarantine (1923 film), a 1923 German silent film
- Quarantine (1983 film), a 1983 Soviet children's film
- Quarantine (2008 film), a 2008 US science fiction horror film
- Quarantine 2: Terminal, a 2011 US science fiction horror film, sequel to the 2008 film
- Quarantine (2021 film), a 2021 Russian dystopian drama film

== Literature ==
- Quarantine (Egan novel), a 1992 science fiction novel by Greg Egan
- Quarantine (Crace novel), a 1997 novel by Jim Crace
- Quarantine (poem), a poem by Eavan Boland about the Irish famine

== Music ==
- Quarantine, a 2010 album by GRITS
- Quarantine (Laurel Halo album), 2012
- "Quarantine", a 2017 song by Flobots from Noenemies
- "Quarantine" (Blink-182 song), a 2020 single

== Television ==
- "Quarantine" (Red Dwarf), a 1992 episode of the British sci-fi comedy Red Dwarf
- "Quarantine" (Stargate Atlantis), a fourth-season episode of the sci-fi series Stargate Atlantis
- "Quarantine" (The Twilight Zone), a 1986 episode of the television series
- "Quarantine" (TUGS episode), the fifth episode of TUGS
- "Quarantine", a 1976 episode of The Onedin Line
- "Quarantine", an episode of The Good Doctor
- "Quarantine", an episode of Zoey 101

== Other uses ==
- Quarantine (video game), a 1994 video game for the 3DO and IBM PC systems
- In grants of indulgences, the term Quarantines means an ecclesiastical penance of 40 days
- Reddit quarantining, process of restricting access to certain Reddit threads

== See also ==
- Sanitorium, medical isolation facility
- Biosafety level
