= Clair Mills Callan =

American anesthesiologist

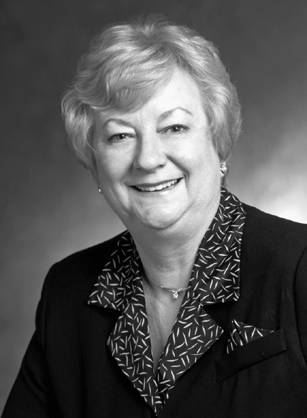
Clair Mills Callan

Clair Mills Callan (born 1940) is an anesthesiologist and vice-president of science, quality, and public health standards for the American Medical Association (AMA).

== Biography ==
Callan was educated at Holy Child Killiney secondary school in County Dublin, Ireland. Early in her career, Callan was a staff anesthesiologist at St. Francis Hospital in Hartford, Connecticut, from 1972 to 1975. She later worked for the state of Connecticut, as medical director of the Department of Income Maintenance, where she administered medical aspects of Connecticut's Medicaid program, from 1978 to 1984.

She was director of medical affairs for Abbott Laboratories from 1985 to 1992, where she did critical research on new anesthesia products. The team she led completed the global development of a new drug within two years, and their work included innovative research on kidney function that led to the conclusion that the kidney is a metabolic as well as an excretory organ. Before joining the staff of the AMA in 1999, Callan was vice president of Abbott's Hospital Products Division.

As vice-president for Science, Quality, and Public Health Standards at the American Medical Association, Callan is responsible for AMA programs in Medicine and Public Health, Science and Community Health Advocacy, Alcohol Policy Advocacy, Tobacco Policy Advocacy, Science, Research and Technology, Clinical Quality Improvement, and Disaster Preparedness.

Callan holds an honorary fellowship from the Faculty of Anesthesia, Royal College of Surgeons, Ireland, and is a Fellow of the Institute of Medicine, Chicago. She was also awarded the Certified Physician Executive (C.P.E.) board certification from the American College of Physician Executives. She is married to fellow physician John P. Callan, M.D., and the couple has four children.
