= Eavan Boland =

Irish poet, author, and professor (1944–2020)

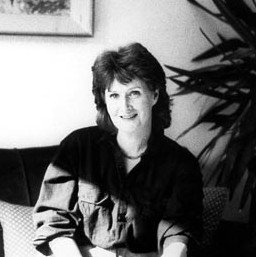
- Boland, 1996
- Born: Eavan Aisling Boland; 24 September 1944; Dublin, Ireland
- Died: 27 April 2020 (aged 75); Dublin, Ireland
- Education: Trinity College Dublin
- Occupations: Poet, author, professor
- Spouse: Kevin Casey (m. 1969)
- Children: 2
- Relatives: Frederick Boland (father); Frances Kelly (mother)
- Writing career
- Language: English
- Period: 1962–2020
- Notable awards: Jacob's Award; 1976

Eavan Aisling Boland (/iːˈvæn ˈæʃlɪŋ ˈboʊlənd/ ee-VAN ASH-ling BOH-lənd; 24 September 1944 – 27 April 2020) was an Irish poet, author, and professor. She was a professor at Stanford University, where she had taught from 1996. Her work deals with the Irish national identity, and the role of women in Irish history. A number of poems from Boland's poetry career are studied by Irish students who take the Leaving Certificate. She was a recipient of the Lannan Literary Award for Poetry.

== Early life and education ==
Boland's father, Frederick Boland, was a career diplomat and her mother, Frances Kelly, was a noted painter. She was born in Dublin in 1944.

When she was six, Boland's father was appointed Irish Ambassador to the United Kingdom, and the family moved to London, where Boland had her first experiences of anti-Irish sentiment. Her dealing with this hostility strengthened Boland's identification with her Irish heritage. She spoke of this time in her poem, "An Irish Childhood in England: 1951".

At 14, she returned to Dublin to attend Holy Child School in Killiney. She published a pamphlet of poetry (23 Poems) in her first year at Trinity, in 1962. Boland earned a BA with First Class Honors in English Literature and Language from Trinity College Dublin in 1966.

== Career ==
=== Teaching and Professorial roles ===
After graduating, Boland held numerous teaching positions and published poetry, prose criticism and essays. She taught at Trinity College Dublin, University College, Dublin, and Bowdoin College, and was a member of the International Writing Program at the University of Iowa. She was also writer in residence at Trinity College Dublin, and at the National Maternity Hospital.

In 1969, Boland married the novelist Kevin Casey; they had two daughters together. Her experiences as a wife and mother influenced her to write about the centrality of the ordinary, as well as providing a frame for more political and historical themes. According to her friend Gabrielle Calvocoressi, she "loved gossip like fish love water".

In the late 1970s and 1980s, Boland taught at the School of Irish Studies in Dublin. From 1996 she was a tenured Professor of English at Stanford University where she was the Bella Mabury and Eloise Mabury Knapp Professor in the Humanities and Melvin and Bill Lane Professor for Director of the Creative Writing program. She divided her time between Palo Alto and her home in Dublin.

=== Poetry ===
Eavan Boland's first book of poetry was New Territory published in 1967 with Dublin publisher Allen Figgis. This was followed by The War Horse (1975), In Her Own Image (1980). Night Feed (1982), established her reputation as a writer on the ordinary lives of women and on the difficulties faced by women poets in a male-dominated literary world.

Boland was writer in residence at the National Maternity Hospital, Dublin, in 1994. During this time she composed 'Night Feed' and 'The Tree of Life', and her work remains on a plaque in the hospital garden.

Several of her volumes of poetry have been Poetry Book Society Choices in the UK, where she is primarily published by Carcanet Press. In the United States her publisher is W. W. Norton.

Her poem "Quarantine" was one of 10 poems shortlisted for RTÉ's selection of Ireland's favourite poems of the last 100 years in 2015.

Former Irish Taoiseach, Bertie Ahern, quoted from her poem "The Emigrant Irish" in his address to the joint houses of the US Congress in May 2008.

On 15 March 2016, President Obama quoted lines from her poem "On a Thirtieth Anniversary" (from "Against Love Poetry" 2001) in his remarks at a reception in the White House to celebrate Saint Patrick's Day.

In March 2018 RTE broadcast a documentary on her life as a poet called "Eavan Boland: Is it Still the Same?". In the same year, Boland was commissioned by the Government of Ireland and the Royal Irish Academy to write the poem "Our future will become the past of other women" to be read at the UN and in Ireland during the centenary commemorations of women gaining the vote in Ireland in 1918.

=== Editing and translating ===
Boland co-edited The Making of a Poem: A Norton Anthology of Poetic Forms (with Mark Strand; W. W. Norton & Co., 2000). She also published a volume of translations in 2004 called After Every War (Princeton University Press). With Edward Hirsch, she co-edited "The Making of a Sonnet: A Norton Anthology of the Sonnet" (W. W. Norton & Co., 2008).

== Awards ==
In 1976, Boland won a Jacob's Award for her involvement in The Arts Programme broadcast on RTÉ Radio. Her other awards include a Lannan Foundation Award in Poetry and an American Ireland Fund Literary Award.

Her collection In a Time of Violence (1994) received a Lannan Award and was shortlisted for the T. S. Eliot Prize.

In 1997 she received an honorary degree from University College Dublin. She also received honorary degrees from Strathclyde University and Colby College in the US in 1997, and the College of the Holy Cross in 1999. She received one from Bowdoin College in 2004. In 2004 she also received an honorary degree from Trinity College Dublin.

Boland received the Bucknell Medal of Distinction 2000 from Bucknell University, the Corrington Medal for Literary Excellence Centenary College 2002, the Smartt Family prize from the Yale Review and the John Frederick Nims Award from Poetry Magazine 2002.

Her volume of poems Against Love Poetry was a New York Times Notable Book of the Year.

Her volume Domestic Violence (2007) was shortlisted for the Forward prize in the UK. Her poem 'Violence Against Women' from the same volume was awarded the James Boatwright III Prize for Poetry for the best poem published in 2007 in Shenandoah magazine.

In 2012, Boland won a PEN Award for creative nonfiction with her collection of essays, A Journey With Two Maps: Becoming a Woman Poet published in 2012.

In 2016 she was inducted into the American Academy of Arts and Sciences. In 2017 she received the Bob Hughes Lifetime Achievement Award at the Bord Gáis Energy Irish Book Awards.

On 25 May 2018 she was elected an honorary member of the Royal Irish Academy. Boland received the Irish PEN Award for Literature in 2019.

== Death and legacy ==
Boland was writer in residence at the National Maternity Hospital, Dublin, in 1994. During this time she composed 'Night Feed' and 'The Tree of Life', and her work remains on a plaque in the hospital garden.

Boland died in Dublin on 27 April 2020, aged 75.

In 2020, Boland was posthumously awarded the Costa Book Award for poetry for her final collection The Historians.

In 2024, Trinity College Dublin announced the renaming of the "denamed" former Berkeley Library as the Eavan Boland Library; this makes it the first building named after any woman on Trinity's city centre campus. The name was made official in March 2025.

== Publications ==
=== Poetry ===
- 23 Poems. Dublin: Gallagher, 1962.
- Autumn Essay. Dublin: Gallagher, 1963.
- Eavan Boland Poetry/Prose Joseph O’Malley. Dublin: Gallagher, 1963.
- New Territory. Dublin: Allen Figgis, 1967.
- W. B. Yeats and His World. With Micheál Mac Liammóir. London: Thames, 1971; New York: Thames & Hudson, 1998.
- The War Horse. London: Victor Gollancz, 1975.
- In Her Own Image. Dublin: Arlen House, 1980.
- Introducing Eavan Boland. Princeton, New Jersey: Ontario Review P, 1981.
- Night Feed. Dublin: Arlen House, 1982. Reissue: Manchester: Carcanet Press, 1994.
- The Journey and Other Poems. Dublin: Arlen House, 1986; Manchester: Carcanet Press, 1987.
- Selected Poems. Manchester: Carcanet Press, 1989.
- Outside History. Manchester: Carcanet Press, 1990.
- Outside History: Selected Poems 1980–1990. New York: Norton, 1990.
- In a Time of Violence. New York: Norton, 1994; Manchester: Carcanet, 1994.
- Collected Poems. Manchester: Carcanet Press, 1995.
- Penguin Modern Poets: Carol Ann Duffy, Vicki Feaver, Eavan Boland. London: Penguin, 1995.
- An Origin Like Water: Collected Poems 1967–1987. New York: Norton, 1996.
- The Lost Land. Manchester: Carcanet Press, 1998.
- The Lost Land: Poems. New York: Norton, 1998.
- Against Love Poetry. New York: Norton, 2001.
- Code. Manchester: Carcanet Press, 2001.
- Three Irish Poets: An Anthology: Eavan Boland, Paula Meehan, Mary O’Malley. Ed. Eavan Boland. Manchester: Carcanet Press, 2003.
- After Every War: Twentieth-Century Women Poets. Trans. Eavan Boland. Princeton, New Jersey: Princeton UP, 2004.
- New Collected Poems. Manchester: Carcanet Press, 2005.
- Domestic Violence. Manchester: Carcanet Press, 2007; New York: Norton, 2007.
- Irish Writers on Writing. Ed. San Antonio: Trinity University Press, 2007.
- Literary Genius: 25 Classic Writers Who Define English & American Literature. Ed. Joseph Epstein. Philadelphia, PA: Paul Dry Books, 2007. (Illustrated by Barry Moser)
- Selected Poems by Charlotte Mew. Ed. Manchester: Carcanet Press, 2008.
- New Collected Poems. New York: Norton, 2008.
- The Making of a Sonnet: A Norton Anthology. Ed. With Edward Hirsch. New York: Norton, 2008.
- A Journey with Two Maps: Becoming A Woman Poet. (prose essays) Manchester: Carcanet Press, 2011; New York: Norton, 2011
- New Selected Poems (poems) Manchester: Carcanet Press, 2013.
- Eavan Boland: A Poet's Dublin: Edited by Paula Meehan and Jody Allen Randolph. (poems) Manchester: Carcanet Press, 2014.
- A Woman Without A Country (poems) Manchester: Carcanet Press, 2014; New York: Norton, 2014.
- Eavan Boland: A Poet's Dublin: Edited by Paula Meehan and Jody Allen Randolph. (poems) New York: WW. Norton, 2016.
- The Historians: Poems. (poems) New York: WW. Norton, 2020.

=== Prose ===
- Object Lessons: The Life of the Woman and the Poet in Our Time. New York: Norton, 1995; Manchester: Carcanet Press, 1995.
- The Making of a Poem: A Norton Anthology of Poetic Forms. Ed. Eavan Boland and Mark Strand. New York: Norton, 2000.
- The Making of a Sonnet: A Norton Anthology. Ed. With Edward Hirsch. New York: Norton, 2008.
- A Journey with Two Maps: Becoming A Woman Poet. (prose essays) Manchester: Carcanet Press, 2011; New York: Norton, 2011.

== See also ==
- Irish poetry
- List of Irish writers
