= John Dulanty =

Irish diplomat (1883–1955)

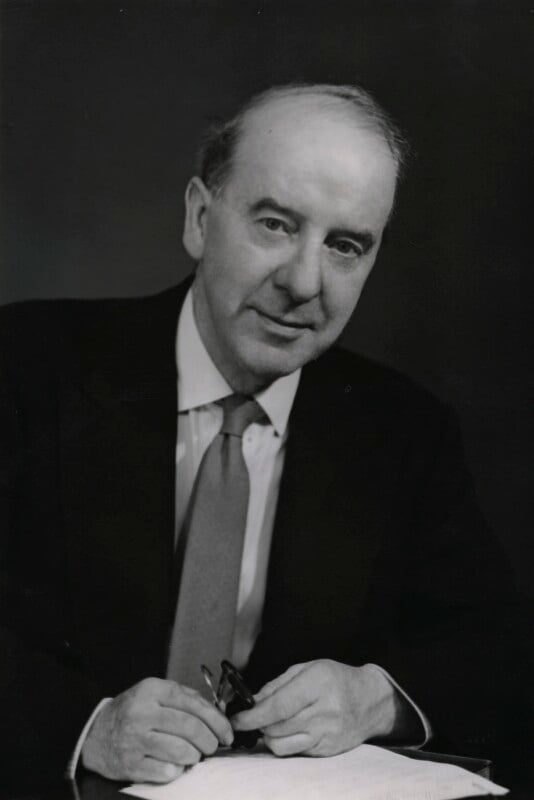
Dulanty in 1950

John Whelan Dulanty CB CBE (1883 – February 1955) was an Irish diplomat. He represented Ireland in London for 20 years, as High Commissioner.

== Biography ==
Dulanty was born in Manchester to a working-class Irish family. His father was from Tipperary and his mother from Limerick. He was educated at St. Mary's, Failsworth, and at Manchester University where he read law. In 1906 he supported Winston Churchill's campaign as a Liberal to win the Manchester North West seat. This connection with Churchill was to prove important in Dulanty's later diplomatic career as High Commissioner in London.

In 1913, he entered the Civil Service. He worked in the Ministry of Munitions during World War I. He later served as Assistant Secretary in the Treasury. In 1920 he left the British civil service because of his opposition to British policy on Ireland. By the time he left he had been awarded C.B. and C.B.E.

For the next 6 years he served as deputy chairman and managing director of the department store Peter Jones, Ltd.

In 1926 he joined the Irish Civil Service and was appointed Commissioner for Trade in Great Britain. At that time he had not lived for any length of time in Ireland, but in the words of The Times, "There was no mistaking that he was an Irishman. He had been a leader of the United Irish League of Great Britain under John Redmond and had been busy behind the scenes at the time of the treaty of 1922".

In 1930, he became the last High Commissioner of the Irish Free State in London. In 1937, he became the only High Commissioner of Ireland, due to the 1937 Constitution of Ireland coming into effect on 29 December 1937.

On the termination of Ireland’s last link with the British sovereign in 1949, Dulanty continued to head the Irish diplomatic mission in London. The distinction of becoming first Irish Ambassador there fell to his immediate successor, Frederick Boland, in 1950. Dulanty retired in September 1950.

Diplomatic posts
Preceded by Timothy Smiddy	High Commissioner of the Irish Free State to the United Kingdom; 1930–1937	Office abolished, replaced in 1937 by High Commissioner of Ireland to the United Kingdom.
New office	High Commissioner of Ireland to the United Kingdom; 1937-1950	Office abolished, replaced in 1950 by Ambassador of Ireland to the United Kingdom. Ireland appointed its first Ambassador in 1950
