= Frederick Boland =

Irish diplomat

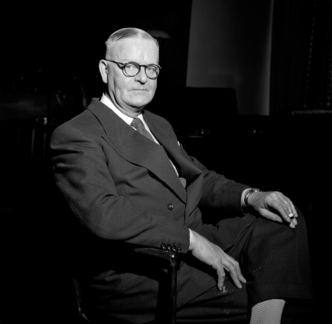
- Boland in 1958

Personal details
- Born: Frederick Henry Boland; 11 January 1904 Dublin, Ireland
- Died: 4 December 1985 (aged 81) Dublin, Ireland
- Spouse: Frances Kelly (m. 1935–1985)
- Children: 5; including Eavan Boland
- Education: Clongowes Wood College, St Olave's Grammar School, Trinity College, and King's Inns
- Occupation: President of the General Assembly, Ambassador for Ireland to Britain and the United Nations

Frederick Henry Boland (11 January 1904 – 4 December 1985) was an Irish diplomat who served as the first Irish Ambassador to both the United Kingdom and the United Nations.

== Family and education ==
Frederick Boland was born on 11 January 1904 at 32 Eden Vale Road, Ranelagh, the second son of Henry Patrick ("H.P.") Boland (1876–1956), a civil servant in the Department of Posts and Telegraphs (retiring as Senior Assistant Secretary to the Minister for Finance), and his wife Charlotte Nolan Taylor. H.P. Boland was son of the workhouse master at Clonmel.

Boland was educated at Clongowes Wood College, St Olave's Grammar School, Trinity College and King's Inns, Dublin, where he received his BA and LLB degrees. He also did a degree in classics at Trinity. He did graduate work at Harvard, the University of Chicago, and the University of North Carolina at Chapel Hill in 1926 to 1928 as a Rockefeller Research Fellow. He received an Honorary LLD degree from the University of Dublin.

He married the painter Frances Kelly on 11 February 1935 in the Church of St Michael, Dún Laoghaire, Dublin, Ireland. They had a son, Fergal and four daughters; Jane, Nessa, Mella, and the poet Eavan Boland.

== Career ==
Boland was Assistant Secretary of the Department of External Affairs from 1939 to 1946, prior to becoming the Secretary, which position he held until 1950. In that role he led negotiations in 1949 that changed Ireland's status from a Dominion within the Commonwealth to a Republic outside it. He was privately critical of the manner in which the Taoiseach, John A. Costello, handled the matter, saying that "he has as much notion of diplomacy as I have of astrology."

He served as the first Irish Ambassador to the Court of St James's in London from 1950 to 1956, a move generally attributed to his inability to work harmoniously with Seán MacBride (Minister for External Affairs 1948–51). In 1956, he became Ireland's Ambassador to the United Nations. Boland was the president of the General Assembly of the United Nations on 12 October 1960, when Nikita Khrushchev allegedly took off his shoe and pounded it on his desk.

Boland served as the 20st Chancellor of Trinity College Dublin between 1963 and 1982. He was made an honorary fellow of Trinity College Dublin in 1983.

Diplomatic posts
Preceded by Víctor Andrés Belaúnde	President of the United Nations General Assembly; 1960–1961	Succeeded by Mongi Slim
Preceded by John Dulanty	Ambassador of Ireland to the United Kingdom; 1950–1956	Succeeded by Con Cremin
Academic offices
Preceded by 2nd Earl of Iveagh	Chancellor of the University of Dublin; 1963–1982	Succeeded by William Bedell Stanford
