= Kilbarrack Church and Cemetery =

Graveyard in Dublin's northern suburbs

Kilbarrack Church and cemetery
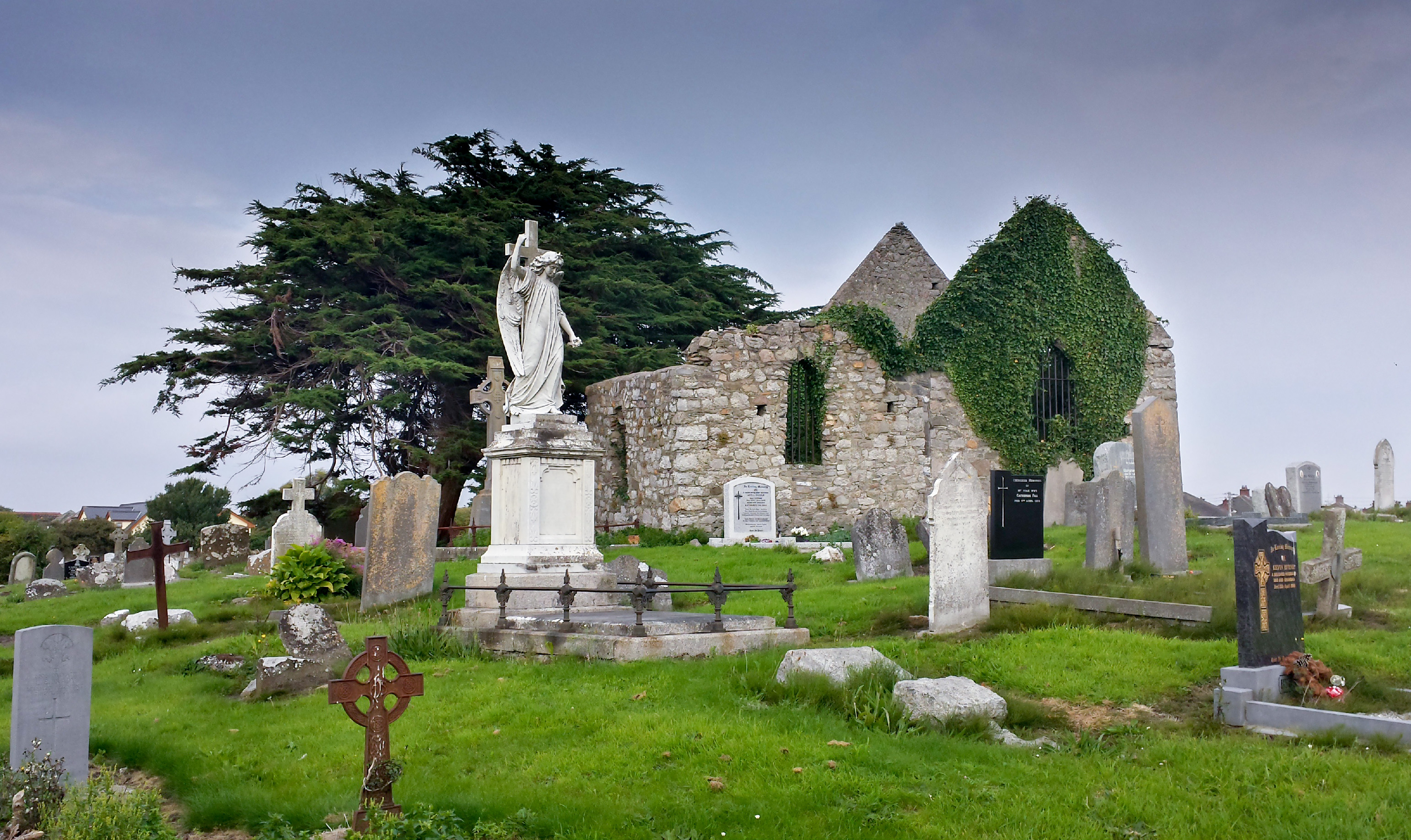
- Church in Kilbarrack Lower, Dublin
- Interactive map of Kilbarrack Church and cemetery

Details
- Location: Howth Road, Kilbarrack / Bayside, Dublin
- Country: Ireland
- Coordinates: 53.387446°N 6.133263°W
- Type: Public
- Owned by: Fingal County Council
- Find a Grave: Kilbarrack Church and cemetery

Kilbarrack Church and Cemetery is a ruined church and graveyard located in the coastal part of Kilbarrack, a northeastern suburb of Dublin. It lies on the road from Dublin to Howth, coastward of the modern district of Bayside. The church is sometimes referred to as the Mariners Church or the Chapel of Mone (Capella de Mone), meaning "chapel of the boggy ground".

== History ==
The church is reportedly built on or near the site of a 6th century church founded by Saint Berach. The ruins of the current Chapel of Mone contain material from the late 12th and early 13th centuries. The church appears to have fallen out of regular use after the Reformation.

The graveyard contains dated memorials from 1654 until the present. Works were carried out to build a perimeter wall and modernise the graveyard as a burial place around 1875-76.

The graveyard is mentioned in Brendan Behan's autobiography Borstal Boy (1958) - "So many belonging to me lay buried in Kilbarrack, the healthiest graveyard in Ireland they said, because it was so close to the sea". His novel 'Richard's Cork Leg' is set in the cemetery.

There is a cenotaph dedicated to executed IRA member Frank Flood which was erected by his parents.

== Notable burials ==
- Eoin MacNeill, Irish nationalist, scholar and politician.
- James McNeill, brother of the above and Governor-General of the Irish Free State
- Josephine McNeill, wife of the above, Irish diplomat.
- Daniel Head, IRA volunteer killed in the Burning of the Custom House
- Thomas Wall, killed in the Battle of Dublin during the Irish Civil War
- Francis Higgins (1746–1802), the "Sham Squire", an informer during the 1798 rebellion. His tomb was later smashed with sledgehammers and there is no trace of its remains today.
