= Timothy Smiddy =

Irish academic, economist and diplomat

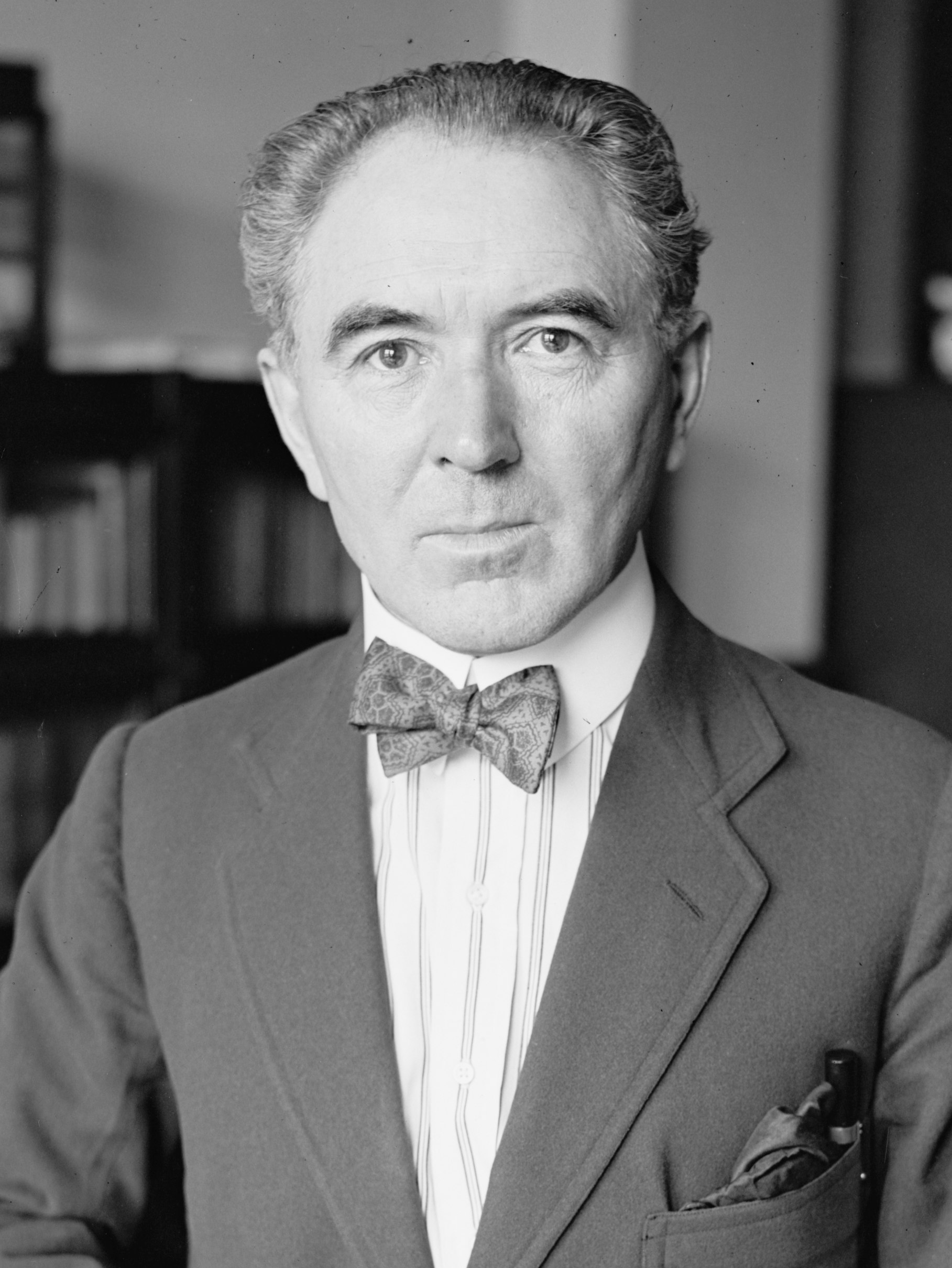
- Smiddy in 1925

Personal details
- Born: April 30, 1875. Kilbarry, County Cork, UK
- Died: February 9, 1962 (aged 86) Dublin, Ireland
- Resting place: Dean's Grange Cemetery, Dublin, Ireland

Timothy Aloysius Smiddy (1875–1962) was an Irish academic, economist, and diplomat. He is best known as Ireland's first Ambassador/overseas Minister, serving as Envoy Extraordinary and Minister Plenipotentiary to the United States of America for the Irish Free State from 1924 to 1929.

== Personal life ==
Timothy Aloysius "Audo" Smiddy was born on 30 April 1875 in Kilbarry, County Cork, the son of William Smiddy, a wealthy merchant originally from Ballymacoda, East Cork, and Honora Mahony, of the Blarney Mahony family. He was educated at St. Finbarr's College Cork, before attending University College Cork, graduating with a B.A. (1905) and an M.A. (1907). Later he attended universities in Paris, France and Cologne, Germany. At one point, he considered the priesthood and studied at St Sulpice seminary near Paris. However, in October 1900, he married Lillian "Muddie" O'Connell, also from Cork city. They had six children including five daughters and a son.

== Role in independence ==
A contemporary and friend of Michael Collins, the Irish revolutionary, Smiddy was appointed by Collins to be his Economic Adviser to Plenipotentiaries for the Treaty Negotiations from October to December 1921 following the War of Independence. This was at a time when Michael Collins was the Minister for Finance in the putative Republic.

== Professor of Economics, UCC ==
Smiddy was first and foremost an academic and an economist. After his marriage, he studied part-time and completed his BA in 1905 and his MA in 1907. He then worked at the College at Cork in the newly constituted National University of Ireland, which replaced the Royal University of Ireland, Smiddy was holder of the Professorship of Economics and Commerce. He served in this post from 1909 to 1924. He was one of only six people to have held the post since the formation of the Department of Mental and Moral Science at the College in 1849. In 1952, he was awarded the Honorary Degree of DEconSc by University College, Cork.

== Minister Plenipotentiary ==
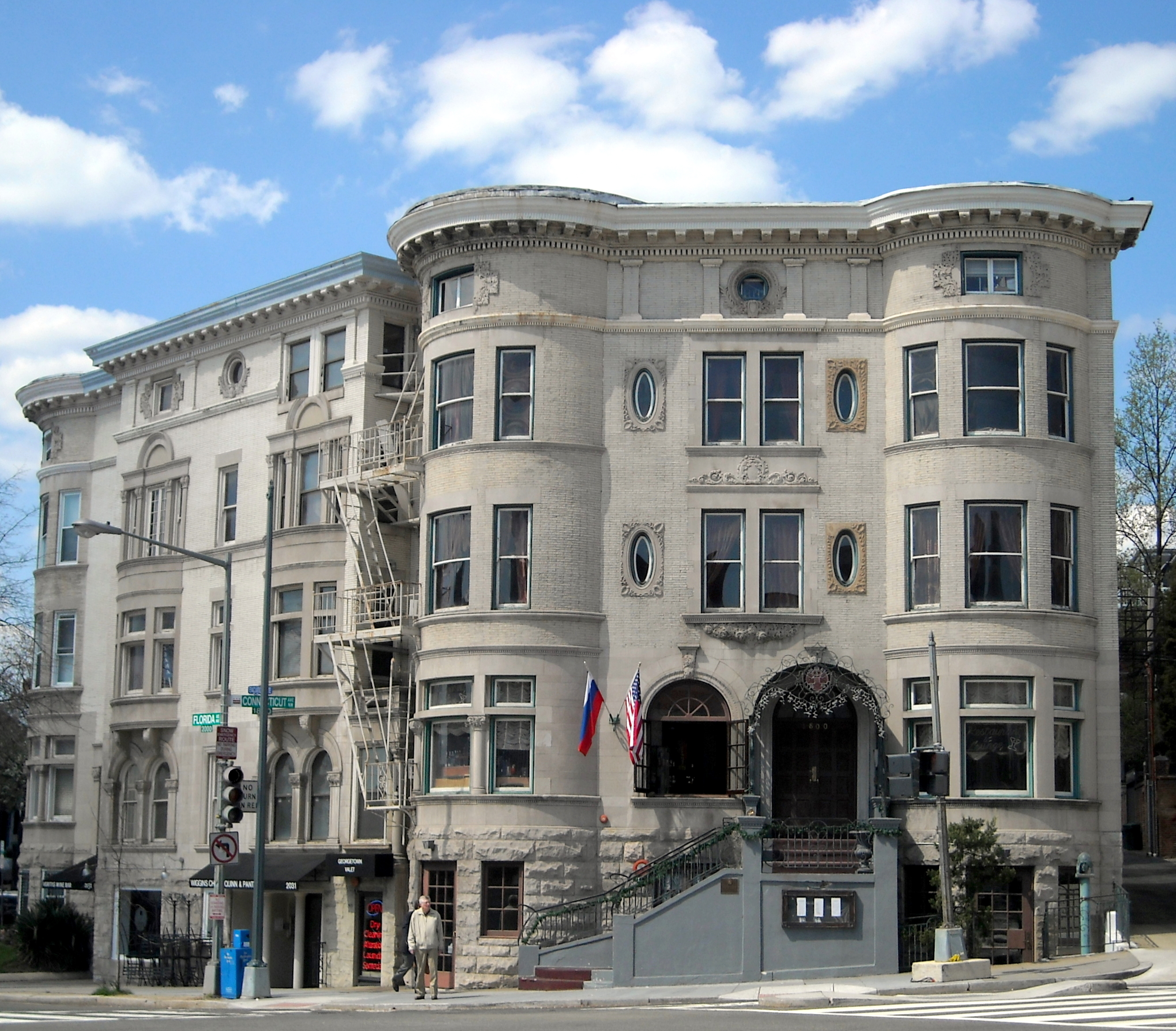
Smiddy's residence in Washington, D.C., during his service as Representative to the United States

Smiddy was initially appointed as the Irish Free State's Representative in Washington in 1922. Following representations by the Free State's government to London and Washington, and in particular to tackle the problem of anti-Treaty propaganda, this role was officially recognised in 1924. From then until 1929, Smiddy served as Minister Plenipotentiary and Envoy Extraordinary to the United States of America for the Irish Free State.

Smiddy's appointment represented not only the establishment of the Irish Free State's first formal diplomatic relations with another country since secession from the UK, but also the first attempt by any British dominion or colony to appoint what would these days be regarded as an Ambassador to a third country. The appointment was also a significant development in the domestic affairs of Irish Free State, as it was "part of an overall campaign to discredit Republican attacks on the integrity of the Free State and to strengthen the new state's position by formally demonstrating its essential independence from the United Kingdom."

== Later life ==
Smiddy also served as the Irish Free State's High Commissioner to London (1929–30). He was a member of the Tariff Commission (1930–33) and then became chairman of the Commission on Agriculture (1939–1945). Thereafter, he served on various Boards, and was head of Combined Purchasing Section at the Department of Local Government and Public Health from 1933 to 1945. He was also Director of the Irish Central Bank (1943-1955).

Throughout the late 1930s and the 1940s, Smiddy advised the de Valera government on economic matters. In particular, he was instrumental in bringing about a universal child allowance.

He died in 1962 and is buried in Deansgrange Cemetery.

Diplomatic posts
Preceded by James McNeill	Irish High Commissioner to the United Kingdom; 1929–1930	Succeeded by John Dulanty
