= Frances Kelly =

Irish artist

- Born: Frances Josephine Kelly; 14 February 1908; Drogheda, County Louth, Ireland
- Died: 20 August 2002 (aged 94); Donnybrook, Dublin, Ireland
- Known for: Painting
- Spouse: Frederick Boland (m. 1935–1985)
- Children: 5; including Eavan Boland

Frances Josephine Kelly (14 February 1908 – 2002; usually known as Judy Boland) was an Irish painter.

== Private life ==
Kelly was born on 14 February 1908 in Coolagh Bridge, Drogheda, County Louth to James and Marion Kelly (née Shields).

On 11 February 1935, she married Irish diplomat Frederick Boland, an Irish diplomat who served as the United Nations representative for Ireland. By the age of 27, when she married, she had attained prominence as a painter.

She had a son, Fergal and four daughters: Jane, Nessa, Mella, and the poet Eavan Boland.

She died 20 August 2002 in Donnybrook, Dublin.

== Artistic career ==
Kelly studied at the Metropolitan School of Art, Dublin, and, from 1932 to 1935, in Paris with the cubist painter Léopold Survage.

In Ireland, she painted the murals in Tullamore Hospital, and those at the old Russell Hotel, Dublin. Kelly specialized in still life works.

Her work was part of the painting event in the art competition at the 1932 Summer Olympics in Los Angeles.
