= James McNeill =

Irish politician and diplomat (1869–1938)

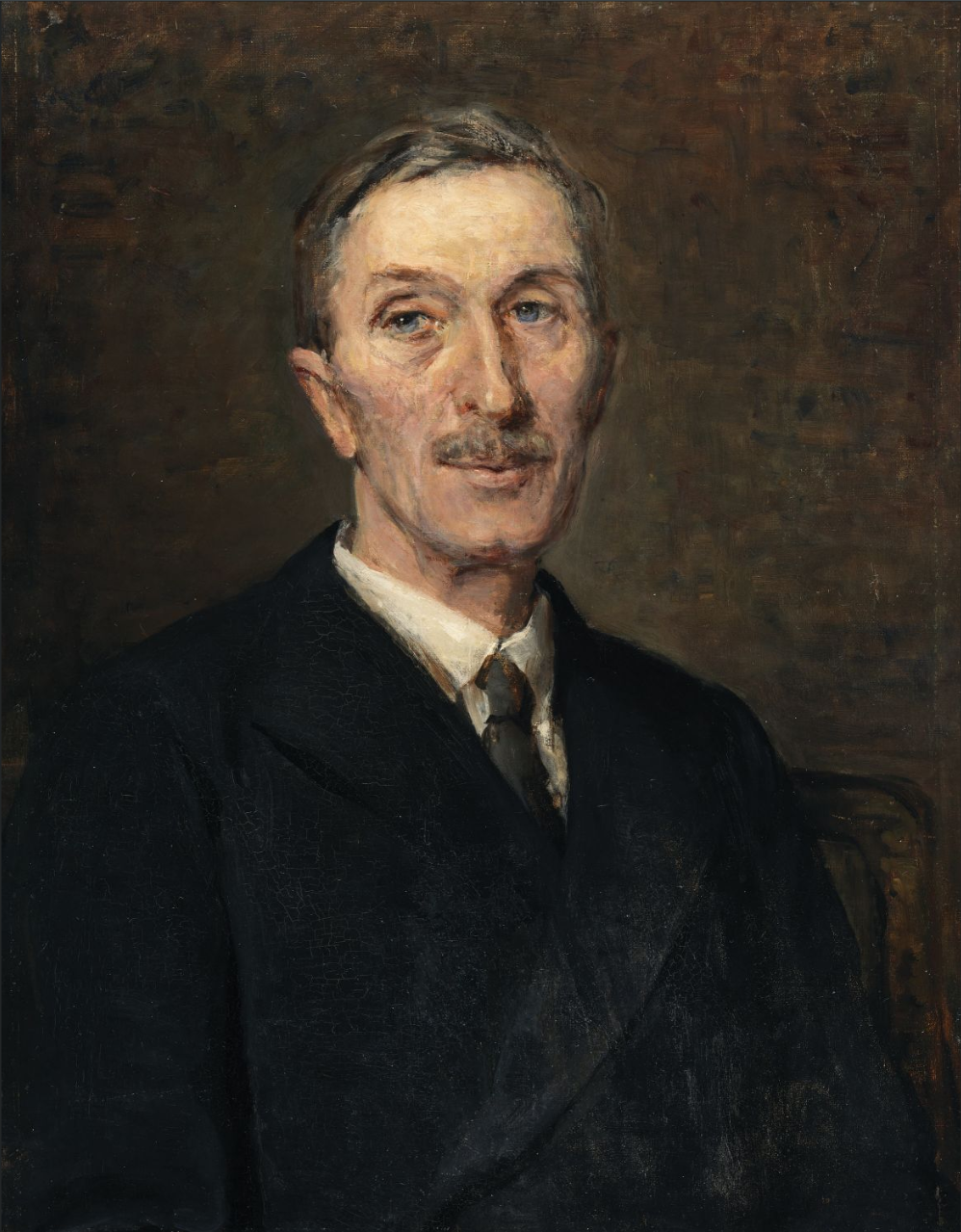

Governor-General of the Irish Free State
- In office 1 February 1928 – 1 November 1932
- Monarch: George V
- President: W. T. Cosgrave; Éamon de Valera
- Preceded by: Tim Healy
- Succeeded by: Domhnall Ua Buachalla

Personal details
- Born: Timothy James McNeill; 27 March 1869 Glenarm, County Antrim, Ireland
- Died: 12 December 1938 (aged 69) London, England
- Spouse: Josephine Ahearne

James McNeill (27 March 1869 – 12 December 1938) was an Irish colonial administrator, politician, and diplomat, who served as the first High Commissioner to London and second Governor-General of the Irish Free State.

== Early life and colonial service ==
One of five children born to Archibald McNeill, a Roman Catholic working-class "baker, sailor and merchant", and his wife, Rosetta (née McAuley) McNeill, James was the brother of nationalist leader Eoin MacNeill.

McNeill was educated at Belvedere College, before preparing for the entrance examinations to the Indian Civil Service at Blackrock College. He was successful in 1888; and after a period at Emmanuel College, Cambridge, he went to India in 1890. He rose to become Commissioner of the Central Division of the Bombay Presidency and was an additional member of the Imperial Legislative Council. He retired in 1914 upon reaching pension age.

== Career in Ireland ==
During the Easter Rising in 1916, McNeill was arrested and jailed by the British Dublin Castle administration. On release, he was elected to Dublin County Council, becoming its chairman. He served as a member of the committee under Michael Collins, the chairman of the Provisional Government, that drafted the Constitution of the Irish Free State. He was subsequently appointed as High Commissioner from the Irish Free State to the United Kingdom.

=== Governor-General ===
When the first Governor-General of the Irish Free State, Tim Healy, retired in December 1927, James McNeill was proposed as his replacement by the Irish government of W. T. Cosgrave and duly appointed by King George V as Governor-General of the Irish Free State.

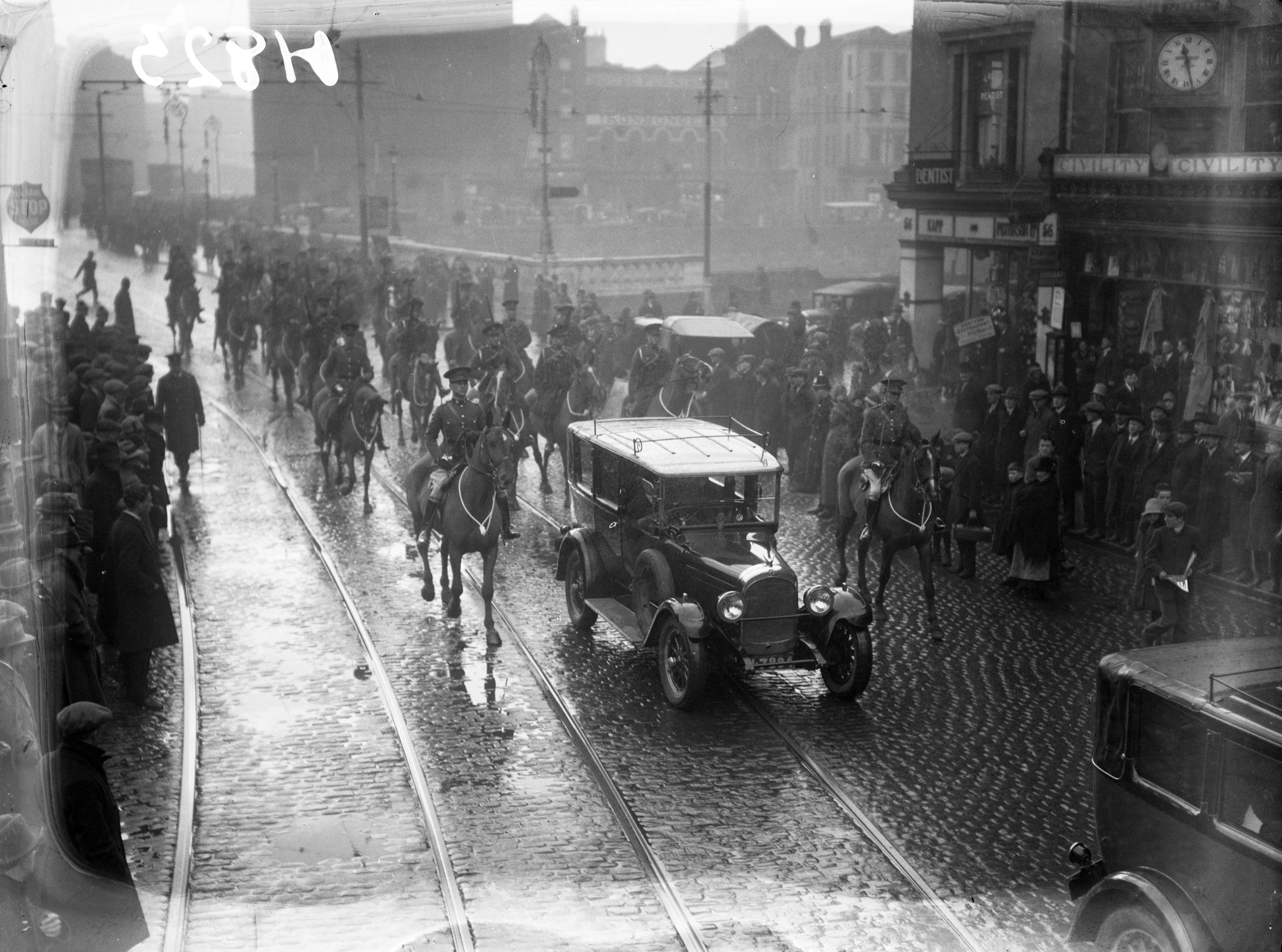
Procession for James MacNeill, as new Governor General, 1 February 1928

In office, McNeill clashed with the King's Private Secretary when he insisted on following the constitutional advice of his Irish ministers, rather than that of Buckingham Palace, in procedures relating to the receipt of Letters of Credence accrediting ambassadors to the King in Ireland. He also refused to attend ceremonies in Trinity College Dublin, when some elements in the college tried to ensure that the old British national anthem God Save the King was played, rather than the new Irish anthem, Amhrán na bhFiann.

When Éamon de Valera was nominated as President of the Executive Council in 1932, McNeill opted to travel to Leinster House, the parliament buildings, to appoint de Valera, rather than to require that he go to the Viceregal Lodge, the Governor-General's residence and the former seat of British Lords Lieutenant, to avoid embarrassing de Valera, who was a republican.

The Constitution Committee meeting at the Shelbourne Hotel, Dublin. James McNeill is seated fourth from the right.

However, McNeill's tact was not reciprocated by de Valera's government, and some of its ministers sought to humiliate McNeill as the King's representative by withdrawing the Irish Army's band from playing at functions he attended and demanding he withdraw invitations to visitors to meet him. In one notorious incident in April, two ministers, Seán T. O'Kelly (a future President of Ireland) and Frank Aiken, publicly walked out of a diplomatic function when McNeill, there as the guest of the French ambassador, arrived. In a fury, McNeill wrote to de Valera demanding an apology for this treatment. When none was forthcoming, apart from an ambiguous message from de Valera that could be interpreted as partially blaming McNeill for attending functions at which ministers would be present, he published his correspondence with de Valera, even though de Valera had formally advised him not to do so. De Valera then demanded that George V dismiss McNeill.

The King engineered a compromise, whereby de Valera withdrew his dismissal request and McNeill, who was due to retire at the end of 1932, would push forward his retirement date by a month or so. McNeill, at the King's request, resigned on 1 November 1932.

In June 1932, John Charles McQuaid, President of Blackrock College, hosted an extravagant garden party to welcome Papal Legate Cardinal Lorenzo Lauri, who had arrived in Ireland to represent Pope Pius XI at the 31st International Eucharistic Congress. While De Valera maintained a very high profile at the event, McQuaid (at de Valera's request) went to great lengths to avoid McNeill to the extent possible.

== Death ==
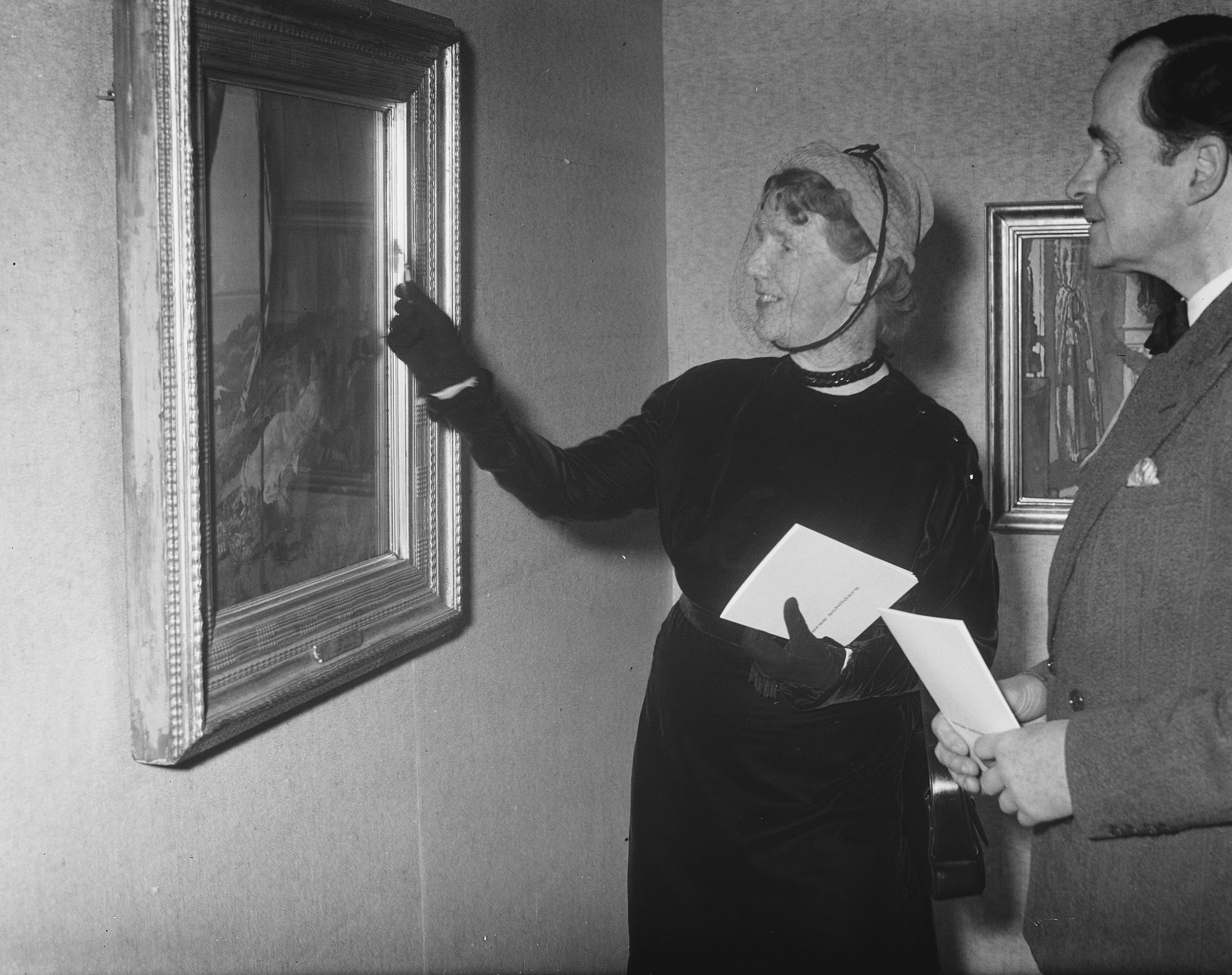
Josephine McNeill (1951)

James McNeill died in 1938 at the age of 69 in London. His widow Josephine was appointed Minister to the Hague by Seán MacBride, Minister for External Affairs in the coalition government of 1948. He is buried in Kilbarrack Cemetery.

Political offices
Preceded by Tim Healy	Governor-General of the Irish Free State; 1928–1932	Succeeded by Domhnall Ua Buachalla
Diplomatic posts
New office	Irish High Commissioner to the United Kingdom; 1923–1928	Succeeded by Timothy Smiddy
