= Kilbarrack =

Suburb of Dublin, Ireland

Kilbarrack Cill Bharróg (Irish)
- Suburb
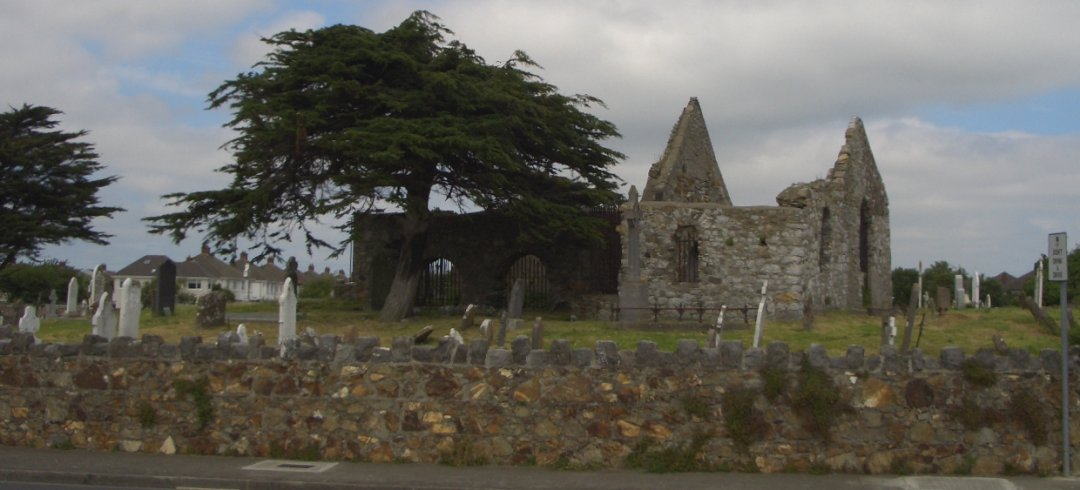
- Old Kilbarrack Church (Mariners Church, Chapel of Mone) and graveyard, beside the original Kilbarrack village, now Bayside

- Location in Ireland
- Coordinates: 53°23′N 6°09′W
- Country: Ireland
- Province: Leinster
- County: County Dublin
- Local authority: Dublin City Council
- Elevation: 10 m (33 ft)
- Eircode routing key: D05

Kilbarrack (Irish: Cill Bharróg, meaning 'church of Saint Berach' or 'church of young Barra') is a residential suburb of Dublin, Ireland, running inwards from the coast, about 8 km (5.0 mi) from the city's centre. It is also a civil parish in the ancient barony of Coolock. Modern-day Kilbarrack is within the jurisdiction of Dublin City Council, with part of its old lands now in Donaghmede, and part in Bayside under Fingal County Council jurisdiction.

== Location ==
Kilbarrack is situated on the Northside of the city, between the suburbs of Raheny, Donaghmede and Bayside (the latter was formed from Kilbarrack's old core). It originally bordered Sutton also, and the coastal part may still do so. Its coastal area faces North Bull Island across the water known as Raheny Lake or Crab Water.

== History and nature ==
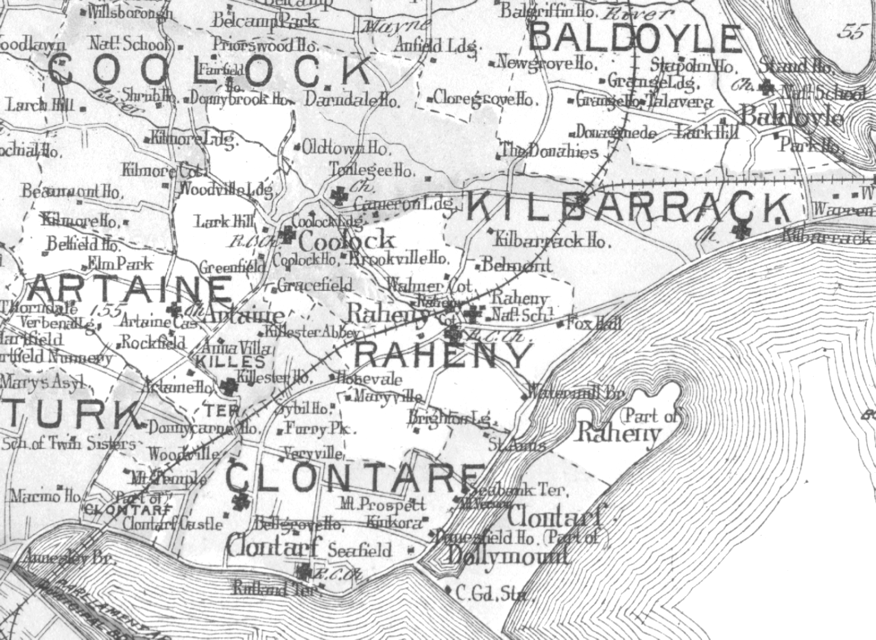
Kilbarrack and neighbouring districts, 1901 - since then, parts have been taken into the new districts of Donaghmede and Bayside

Kilbarrack is an old district, whose name can be found on maps and sea charts, many held at Dublin City Archive, going back several hundred years. One of its first references is in Archbishop John Alen's register of 1185. It was historically a large area of fields, many being grange lands held by Dublin church establishments, with small settlements. Over time, two hamlets emerged, Kilbarrack proper, near the seafront, close to the still-extant Kilbarrack Church and Cemetery, and Little Kilbarrack, on the road inland (now Tonlegee Road).

The district is crossed by one of Dublin's small waterways, the Kilbarrack Stream or Donough Water, which enters the sea in two branches.

The coastal church (mapped as "Kilbarrack Church, in ruins") and surrounding graveyard were a point of call for mariners, and the church is noted in some records as the "Chapel of Mone". At one time, ships entering Dublin Bay paid monies to the city authorities towards the upkeep of the chapel. Burials within the adjoining cemetery include the grave of Francis Higgins (the "Sham Squire").

The site of Kilbarrack hamlet, and the part of the district bounding Sutton and Baldoyle, are now together known as Bayside (from inside Kilbarrack Road to Baldoyle Road), while today's Kilbarrack, and the Greendale shopping and civic complex, are close to where Little Kilbarrack stood. The Tesco-led shopping centre is near the site of the former "big house" of the area, Kilbarrack House.

In the 1970s, Swans Nest Court, a complex of tower blocks of flats was built by Dublin Corporation. It was demolished and redeveloped into social and affordable housing in the early 2000s after it fell into disrepair.

== Transport ==
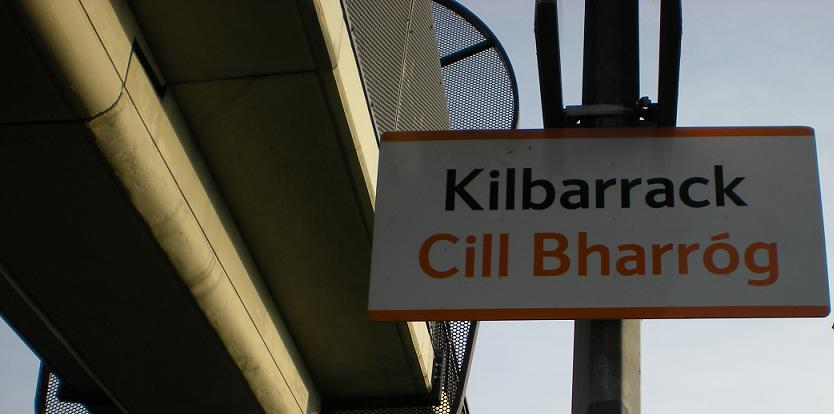
Kilbarrack railway station signage

Kilbarrack railway station is a stop on the (DART) Dublin Area Rapid Transit suburban rail system between Raheny and Howth Junction stations. The station originally opened, in June 1969, as a halt. It has been a DART stop since the 1980s.

The area is accessible from the coast road and the Tonlegee Road, and by bus routes N6 from Finglas, H3 to Howth or the city centre and H2, to the city centre or Portmarnock and Malahide. It is around 5 km (3.1 mi) from the M1 and M50 motorways and 7 km from Dublin Airport.

== Amenities ==
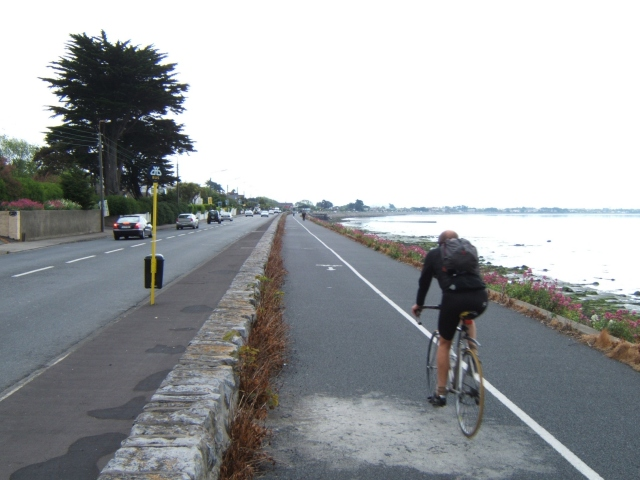
Coastal cycleway in Kilbarrack alongside Dublin Bay.

Kilbarrack has a local office of Dublin City Council, two shopping precincts (Greendale, with a large Centra, and Kilbarrack, anchored by Tesco) and a number of other shops and pubs. There is a Health Services Executive centre, and, at the boundary with Raheny and Donaghmede, a municipal fire station and practice yard.

Kilbarrack has five primary schools, three in one grouping: Scoil Eoin, the Educate Together North Bay School and Gaelscoil Mide, previously of Donaghmede, and two in another group: St. Benedict's and St. Mary's, located beside St. Benedict's parish church.

Kilbarrack is home to several sporting clubs and teams, including Bay City Boxing Club, Naomh Barrog GAA Club, Kilbarrack United FC (who play intermediate football in the Leinster Senior League), and Kilmount Boys FC (who were Amateur Football League champions 2006–07).

The modern Roman Catholic parish church serves Kilbarrack and part of Raheny (Parish of Kilbarrack-Foxfield); some locals attend St. Benedict's Church in Grange Park Parish, which also serves some in Raheny.

== People ==
- Roddy Doyle, author, Booker Prize winner and former teacher at Greendale Community School in Kilbarrack, represented Kilbarrack (thinly disguised as Barrytown) in a series of popular fiction works.
- Andrew Maxwell, stand-up comedian
- Jack Moylan, association footballer, is from the area
- Michael Woods, former politician and government minister, lives on Kilbarrack Road
- Killian Phillips, association footballer

== In popular culture ==
In The 1991 Film The Commitments night time scene ‘what kind of music are we gonna be playing Jimmy ? Soul.’ walking up the ramp of the famous Old ‘Bridge’ in Kilbarrack crossing over the Train Station ‘over the bridge’. The 1993 film The Snapper was filmed in Kilbarrack East Briarfield Road opposite Kilbarrack Train Station. The 1996 film The Van, part of Roddy Doyle's "Barrytown trilogy", was partially filmed in Kilbarrack.

== See also ==
- List of towns and villages in Ireland
