= Martin Fraser =

Irish civil servant

Ambassador of Ireland to the United Kingdom
- Incumbent
- Assumed office 21 August 2022
- Taoiseach: Micheál Martin; Leo Varadkar; Simon Harris
- Preceded by: Adrian O'Neill

Secretary General of the Department of the Taoiseach
- In office 1 August 2011 – 3 May 2022
- Taoiseach: Enda Kenny; Leo Varadkar; Micheál Martin
- Preceded by: Dermot McCarthy
- Succeeded by: John Callinan

Personal details
- Born: 9 December 1969 (age 56) Dublin, Ireland
- Education: Trinity College Dublin; University College Dublin

Martin Fraser (born 9 December 1969) is an Irish civil servant and diplomat who has served as Ambassador of Ireland to the United Kingdom since August 2022 and previously served as the Secretary General of the Department of the Taoiseach from August 2011 to May 2022. He previously served as the Assistant Secretary General of the Department of the Taoiseach from 2007 to 2011.

He holds a bachelor of commerce degree (1993) from University College Dublin and a master of science degree in economics from Trinity College Dublin. Fraser joined the Civil Service in 1986. He has served in the Departments of Social Welfare, Foreign Affairs and Agriculture and Food.

Fraser was previously director of the Northern Ireland division. He joined the Department of the Taoiseach, as finance officer in 1999.

He was appointed as Assistant Secretary General of the Department of the Taoiseach in 2007, during which time he served as head of the Northern Ireland and international affairs division, the corporate affairs division and the economic and social policy division.

The position in the Department of the Taoiseach is in the gift of the Government. In July 2011, he was appointed as secretary general to the Government and secretary general of the Department of the Taoiseach. On appointment he also became the chairman of the National Economic and Social Council (NESC), which advises the Taoiseach on strategic issues regarding economic and social development. As Secretary General to the Government, he was ex-officio member (Commissioner) of the Commission for Public Service Appointments.

In 2016, Fraser was awarded UCD Alumnus of the Year in Business.

Fraser became Irish ambassador to the United Kingdom in 2022.
