= Bayside, Dublin =

Small northside suburb of Dublin, Ireland

Bayside Cois Bá (Irish)
- Suburb
- Location in Ireland
- Coordinates: 53°23′19″N 6°08′24″W
- Country: Ireland
- Province: Leinster
- County: Dublin
- Local government area: Fingal County Council

Government
  - Dáil constituency: Dublin Bay North
  - EU Parliament: Dublin
- Elevation: 2 m (6.6 ft)
- Eircode routing key: D13

Bayside (Irish: Cois Bá) is a small residential suburb on the northside of Dublin, Ireland, purpose-built from 1967 on lands previously part of Kilbarrack. It has a planned central service area with retail facilities and lies inshore of Bull Island. It absorbed a neighbouring development, Sutton Park, also on Kilbarrack lands adjacent to Baldoyle. Established in 1967 under Dublin Corporation, it was later moved to the jurisdiction of Fingal County Council.

== Location ==
Bayside is located beside the sea, lying inshore of North Bull Island and Dublin Bay, and about 10 km north-east of the city centre. Built in the late 1960s and 1970s, it is situated between Kilbarrack Road in Kilbarrack, from which it was formed and Baldoyle, and lies near Sutton.

The area lies within the civil parish of Kilbarrack and is made up of the townlands of Kilbarrack Upper and Kilbarrack Lower.

Bayside falls within the postal district of Dublin 13.

== History ==
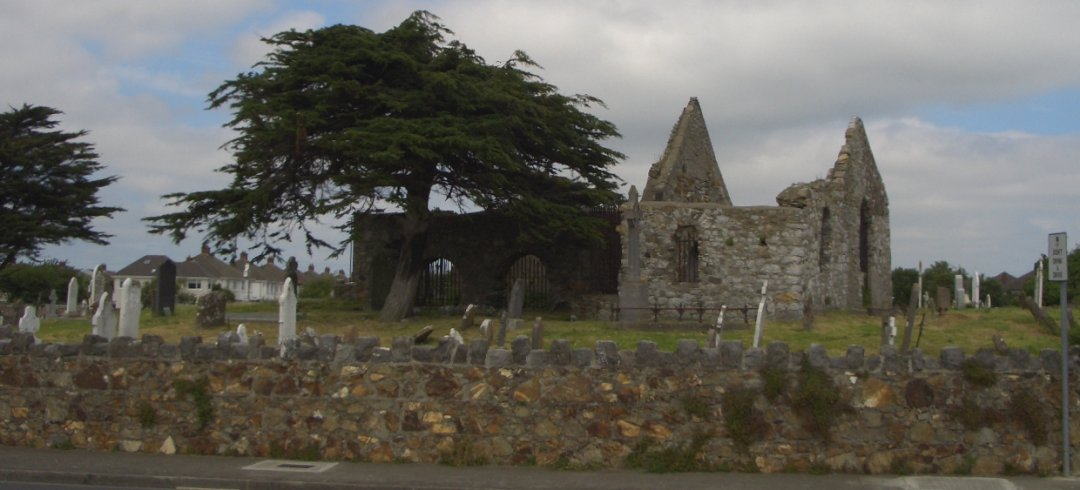
Kilbarrack's historic graveyard, through which part of Bayside can be reached, and chapel

Bayside was a planned development, built in the mid-20th century, on part of the lands of the large old district of Kilbarrack, whose largest settlement lay near what is now the centre of the new area. Title deeds for property in the area still show "Kilbarrack". Kilbarrack's historic church and graveyard, formerly the "Chapel of Mone", dating from the 13th century and once the mariners' church for Dublin, lie about two thirds of the way along Bayside's seafront towards Howth.

Built by Wates Group in the late 1960s and 1970s, Bayside comprises the housing developments of Sutton Park, Sarto, Alden, Verbena, Montini, Roncalli and associated roads including the Bayside Boulevards.

In 2017, celebrations, organised by the Bayside Community Association, were held for the suburb's fiftieth year.

== Governance and representation ==
Established under Dublin Corporation in 1967, the area was later allocated to Fingal when County Dublin was split into three administrative areas.

Bayside was formerly (1937–1977 and 1981–2016) part of the Dublin North-East constituency. In 2016 it became part of the Dublin Bay North constituency.

It is located within the electoral division of Sutton, and is in the local electoral area of Howth–Malahide.

== Transport ==
Bayside is accessed from the main coastal road from the city centre to Howth, and from Kilbarrack Road. It is accessible from Dublin city via the Dublin Area Rapid Transit (DART) suburban rail system. Bayside railway station opened in June 1973. Built as a stop on the line between Howth and the city centre in the early 1970s, this station later became a stop on the first section of the DART.

The area is served by Dublin Bus routes N6, H2 and H3, and route 6. It is also connected by a seafront cycleway to Sutton and to Fairview.

== Amenities ==
Bayside is built up around a central shopping and civic area. Plans to build a multi-storey apartment and retail complex at the location of the current shopping centre car-park were resisted by local residents from 2007 to 2011, but were, after multiple modifications, approved by planning authorities. By October 2017 the centre had been modernised, including the addition of a building for Aldi and a medical practice and gym; at the same time, the squash courts and an old community centre were demolished. There is a modern Catholic parish church, the Church of the Resurrection, within this civic area.

The area has a chipper and a pub. There is a Maxol service station on the coast road nearby.

There is a park officially called Bayside Park but colloquially referred to as the Lamb Chop, a large green in Sutton Park, and a tunnel near the DART station provides immediate access to Seagrange Park in Baldoyle.

== Education ==
There is one primary school, Scoil Mhuire agus Iosef, and the district is serviced by a number of post-primary schools in nearby areas.

== People ==
- Alex Barclay, crime fiction writer and former journalist
- Martin Fay of The Chieftains was a resident in Bayside
- Pat Hooper, Olympian
- Ronan Keating of Boyzone is a former resident of Bayside.
- Becky Lynch, professional wrestler, former resident
- Jack Moylan, professional footballer for Cardiff City F.C and the Republic of Ireland
- Fergal O'Brien, professional snooker player, is a former resident
- Averil Power, former Fianna Fáil Senator
- Steve Wickham, of The Waterboys

== See also ==
- List of towns and villages in the Republic of Ireland
