= Josephine McNeill =

Irish diplomat

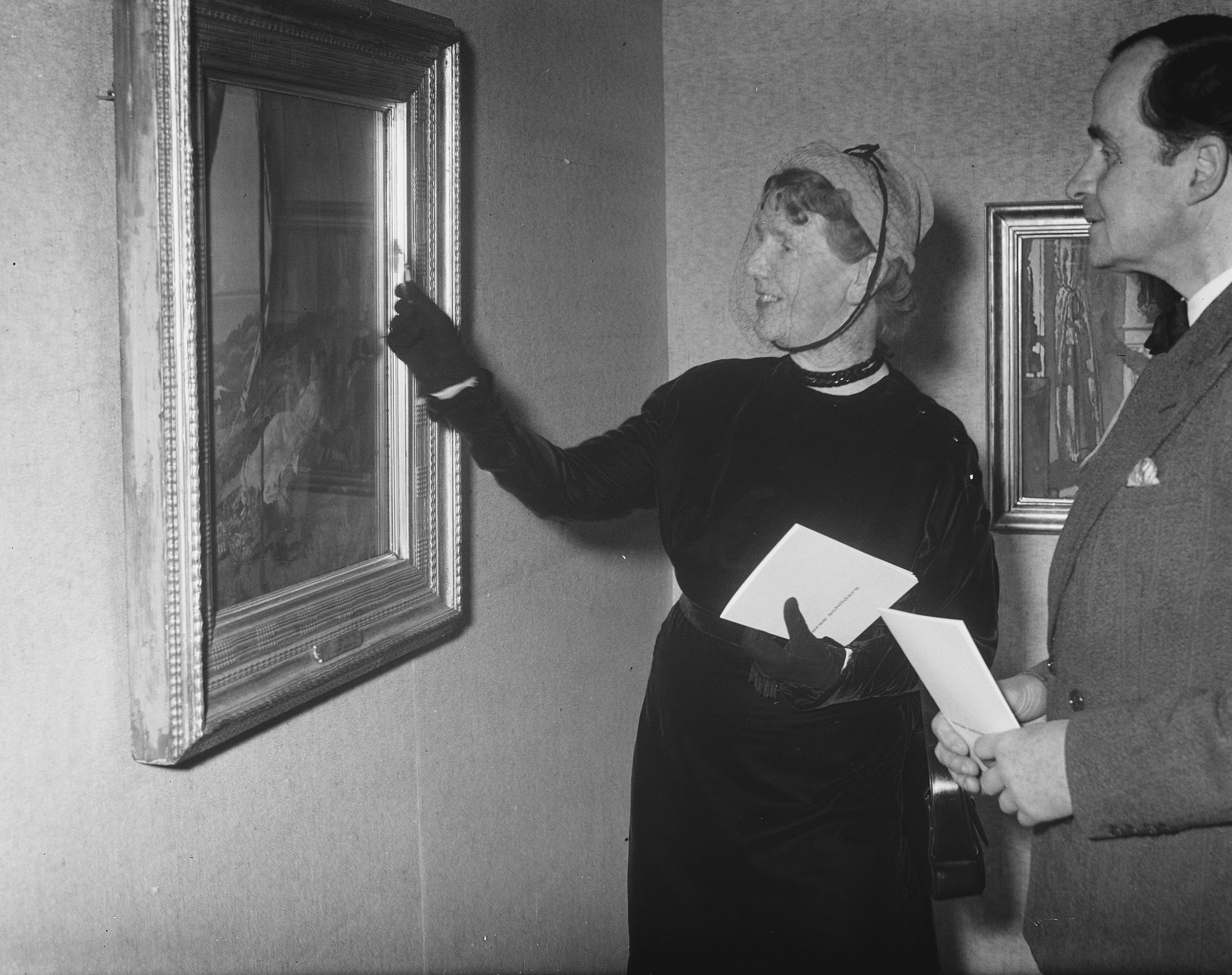
- Born: 31 March 1895; Fermoy, County Cork
- Died: 19 November 1969 (aged 74); St Vincent's Hospital, Dublin

Josephine McNeill (31 March 1895 – 19 November 1969) was an Irish diplomat. She was the first Irish female diplomat appointed to represent Ireland abroad in a ministerial capacity.

== Early life ==
Josephine McNeill was born Josephine Ahearne in Fermoy, County Cork, on 31 March 1895. She was the daughter of shopkeeper and hotelier, James Ahearne and his wife Ellen Ahearne (née O'Brien). She attended the Loretto Convent, Fermoy, and went on to graduate from University College Dublin with a BA H.Dip.Ed. in French and German. With this she began a teaching career, at St Louis’ Convent, Kiltimagh, at the Ursuline Convent, Thurles, and at Scoil Íde. Scoil Íde had been established by her friend, Louise Gavan Duffy, the female counterpart to St. Enda's School. McNeill was a fluent Irish speaker, and took an active part in the cultural elements of the Irish independence movement such as literature and music. She was a member of Cumann na mBan, serving as a member of the executive committee in 1921.

She had been engaged to Pierce McCann, but he died of influenza in Gloucester jail in March 1919. She married James McNeill in 1923, while he was serving as Irish high commissioner in London. Despite her reservations, McNeill became a noted hostess, both in London and later in Dublin when her husband became the Governor-General of the Irish Free State from 1928 to 1932.

== Diplomatic work ==
After the death of her husband in 1938, McNeill became the honorary secretary of the council of the Friends of the National Collections, as well as serving as chair of the executive committee of the Irish Countrywomen's Association until 1950. As a member of the Department of External Affairs advisory committee on cultural relations she wrote on economic, social and cultural issues. She represented Ireland at the UNESCO general assembly in Paris in 1949.

McNeill was an active member of Clann na Poblachta from its foundation in 1946. She was appointed the minister to the Netherlands in 1950 by Seán MacBride, making her the first Irish female diplomat to represent the Republic of Ireland abroad in a ministerial capacity. This appointment was not well received by diplomats in the Department of External Affairs. Her reports from The Hague focused on the issues the Netherlands faced with decolonisation. In 1955 she became the minister to Sweden, going on to hold the joint appointment to Austria and Switzerland from 1956 to 1960, after which she retired. While serving in Switzerland she put aside the resentment she felt towards Éamon de Valera based on how he had treated her husband, to sit with him during a convalescence while de Valera recovered from an eye operation.

== Later life ==
McNeill was an amateur pianist and collected paintings and porcelains. In 1933 she published the Irish language book, Finnsgéalta ó India. She died in St Vincent's Hospital, Dublin on 19 November 1969, and is buried in Kilbarrack Cemetery. Her papers are held in the UCD Archives.
