= List of ambassadors of Ireland to the United Kingdom =

Ambassador of Ireland to Great Britain
- Coat of Arms of Ireland
- Incumbent; Martin Fraser since August 2022
- Style: His Excellency
- Inaugural holder: James McNeill; First High Commissioner; John Whelan Dulanty; First Ambassador
- Formation: 1923; High Commissioner; 1949; Ambassador extraordinary
- Website: Embassy of Ireland, Great Britain

The Ambassador of Ireland to Great Britain is Ireland's foremost diplomatic representative in the United Kingdom and is in charge of Ireland's diplomatic mission in the UK.

== History ==
The High Commission of the Irish Free State was established shortly after Irish secession from the United Kingdom. The first High Commissioner of the Irish Free State to the United Kingdom was James McNeill, who later became the second Governor-General of the state in 1928. From 1936, the Irish government regarded the state as being no longer a member of the British Commonwealth, but rather a state associated with it. Nonetheless, the office holder retained his title. In 1937, the Irish Free State was succeeded by Ireland so the High Commissioner’s title was changed to High Commissioner of Ireland to the United Kingdom. Ireland’s last links with the Commonwealth were terminated in 1949. In 1950 Ireland appointed its first Ambassador of Ireland to the United Kingdom, Frederick Boland, though his letter of credence issued by the Irish government described the country as “Great Britain”. The Irish Foreign Ministry continue to name their Embassy in London as the “Embassy to Great Britain”.

== Heads of mission ==
=== High Commissioners ===
- James McNeill 1923–1928
- Prof. T. A. Smiddy 1929–1930
- John Whelan Dulanty 1930–1950

=== Ambassadors ===
- Frederick Boland 1950–1956
- Con Cremin 1956–1958
- Hugh McCann 1958–1963
- Con Cremin 1963–1964
- ...
- Donal O'Sullivan 1970–1977
- Paul Keating 1977–1978
- Eamonn Kennedy 1978–1983
- Noel Dorr 1983–1987
- Andrew O'Rourke 1987–1991
- Joseph Small 1991–1995
- Edward J. Barrington 1995–2001
- Dáithí O'Ceallaigh 2001–2007
- David J. Cooney 2007–2009
- Bobby McDonagh 2009–2013
- Daniel Mulhall 2013–2017
- Adrian O'Neill 2017–2022
- Martin Fraser 2022–present

== See also ==
- List of ambassadors of the United Kingdom to Ireland
