= Francis Cremin =

Irish professor

Monsignor Patrick Francis Cremin (10 October 1910 - 1 November 2001) STD, JUD was an Irish theologian, who was a professor of Moral and Dogmatic Theology and of Canon Law at St Patrick's College, Maynooth between 1939 and 1980.

== Biography ==
Monsignior Cremin was born in Kenmare, County Kerry in 1910. He was educated at St. Brendan's College, Killarney and St Patrick's College, Maynooth. Following ordination to the priesthood for the Kerry Diocese, he undertook postgraduate work in theology and law at the Pontifical Lateran University in Rome.

He returned from Rome to hold professorships in theology and canon law in Maynooth. In the course of his career, Cremin gave Noel Browne theological advice regarding the Mother and Child Scheme while Browne was Minister for Health in the First Inter-party government Government of the 13th Dáil.

A decade later, he accompanied Archbishop John Charles McQuaid CSSp to Rome as his peritus at the Second Vatican Council, contributing personally to Christus Dominus, the Decree on the Pastoral Office of Bishops. In 1968 he strongly supported the Vatican statement, Humanae vitae on artificial birth control.

Cremin was thought to be a candidate for episcopal office, particularly for his home diocese of Kerry, but this did not materialise. He became increasingly critical of developments in Maynooth through the 1970s. The Irish Independent published a series of articles he wrote on the topic.

He retired in 1980, but contributed towards the framing of the 1983 Code of Canon Law promulgated by Pope John Paul II. He remained active in retirement for many years later. On 1 November 2001 he died in a nursing home in Tralee.

One tribute to him summarised his long life and the many changes he has seen "he witnessed the demise of his victors, the decline of his alma mater and the collapse of Catholic Ireland."

He was not the only gifted member of his family: one of his siblings, Con Cremin, would become a career diplomat and ultimately Secretary-General of the Irish Department of Foreign affairs.

== See also ==
- Catholic Church in Ireland
