= Quarantine (poem) =

Political poem by Eavan Boland

"Quarantine" is a political poem written by Irish poet Eavan Boland about the Irish famine of the mid 19th century, published in her 2001 poetry collection Code. It was one of 10 poems shortlisted for RTÉ's selection of Ireland's favourite poems of the last 100 years in 2015.

The poem is about a couple who leave the workhouse during the worst year of the Irish famine while she was sick with famine fever (typhus). The next day they are found to have frozen to death, with her feet held against his chest as he tried to keep her warm.

The 20-line poem is made up of five stanzas, and is without ornament.
