= Con Cremin =

Irish diplomat

Cornelius Christopher Cremin (6 December 1908 – 20 April 1987) was an Irish diplomat who was born in Kenmare, County Kerry.

One of four children, Cremin was born to a family that operated a drapery business. His brother, Francis Cremin, became a leading academic canon lawyer who framed a number of key church documents. He was educated at St. Brendan's College, Killarney, and from 1926 at University College Cork, where he graduated with a first-class degree in Classics and Commerce.

Around 1929–30, he was awarded the post-graduate University College Cork Honan scholarship. By 1930, he had attained a degree in economics and accountancy. For the following three years he studied in Athens, Munich and Oxford and had attained a travelling scholarship in classics. He subsequently entered the Department of External Affairs after he had succeeded in the competition for third secretary in 1935.

In April 1935, he married Patricia O'Mahony. His first position in Dublin involved working with F.H. Boland on the League of Nations portfolio. In 1937, he was sent abroad on his first posting to Paris, where he worked under the 'tevolutionary diplomat" Art O'Brien, until the latter retired in 1938. Sean Murphy later became his minister.

Ireland declared neutrality on the outbreak of the Second World War, and Murphy and Cremin reported on the developments in France throughout the Phoney War.

After the fall of France, the Irish legation was the last to leave Paris except for the American ambassador, on 11 June 1940. After travelling to Ascain, the legation eventually made its way to the new French capital, Vichy, where it set about looking after the needs of Irish citizens, many of whom had been interned, as they had British passports and had been sending political reports. The political reports were of the highest value and ensured that Ireland continued to observe pro-Allied neutrality throughout the war.

In 1943, Cremin was sent to Berlin to replace William Warnock. Prior to Cremin's arrival, the legation had been bombed. As chargé d'affaires in Berlin, he was responsible for sending back political reports and looking after the interests of Irish citizens. Cremin attempted to assist some European Jews and sent full reports on the Nazi treatment of the Jews in Europe. Warned to leave Berlin before the Soviets arrived, Cremin spent the last weeks of the war near the Swiss border.

In 1945, he was sent to Lisbon, where he met the authoritarian leader António de Salazar and attempted to revive Irish trade. He also reported on the various coups attempts gainst Salazar.

After returning to Ireland in 1946, he was involved in preparing Ireland's Marshall Plan application and tracing the development of Ireland's postwar foreign policy. He had a distinguished career representing Ireland in many foreign missions and at the United Nations.

== Postings ==
- Paris 1937–1940
- Vichy 1940–1943
- Berlin 1943–1945
- Lisbon 1945–1946
- Counsellor 1946–1949
- Assistant Secretary 1949–1950
- Paris 1950–1954
- Vatican 1954–1956
- London 1956–1958
- Secretary (permanent head of the foreign service) 1958–1963
- London 1963–1964
- UN 1964–1974, (Chaired UN Law of the Sea Conference Caracas), (Retired)

In retirement he was a guest lecturer in 1974 at the Law Department of University College Cork

== External reference ==
- Department of Foreign Affairs website,

Diplomatic posts
Preceded by Frederick Boland	Ambassador of Ireland to the United Kingdom; 1956–1958	Succeeded by Hugh McCann
Preceded by Hugh McCann	Ambassador of Ireland to the United Kingdom; 1963–1964	Succeeded by Donal O'Sullivan
