= Holy Child Killiney =

School for girls in County Dublin, Ireland

Location
- Killiney, County Dublin; Ireland
- Coordinates: 53.253147°N 6.114202°W

Information
- Religious affiliation: Roman Catholic
- Established: September 1947
- Enrollment: 341
- Website: holychildkilliney.ie

Holy Child Killiney is a voluntary fee-paying Catholic secondary school under the direction of the Society of the Holy Child Jesus in Killiney, a suburban village in Dún Laoghaire–Rathdown, Ireland.

The school was opened in September 1947, on the premises of the former County Hotel, where it is still located. It initially had 34 pupils, but by 2019 it had 341 pupils.

== Notable alumni ==
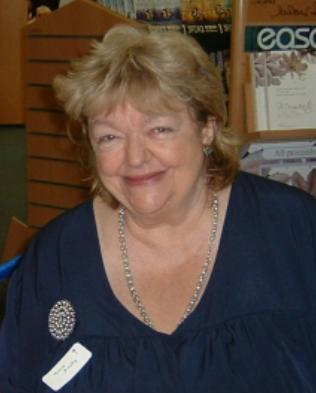
Bestselling author Maeve Binchy, past pupil of Holy Child Killiney

- Maeve Binchy (1939–2012), novelist, playwright, short story writer, columnist, and speaker
- Eavan Boland (1944–2020), poet and academic
